= Sammy Mellor =

American marathon runner (1879–1948)

- Mellor at the 1904 Summer Olympics

Personal information
- Born: Samuel Alexander Mellor Jr. December 19, 1879 Yonkers, New York, U.S.
- Died: November 5, 1948 (aged 68)
- Spouse: Eva Florence Mellor
- Children: 4

Sport
- Sport: Long-distance running
- Event: Marathon

Samuel Alexander Mellor Jr. (December 19, 1879 – November 5, 1948) (Note: Without noting his dates of birth or death, one source states that Mellor lived to be 92 years old.) was an American long-distance runner who won the 1902 Boston Marathon and competed in the marathon at the 1904 Summer Olympics in St. Louis, Missouri.

== Early life ==
Mellor was born in Yonkers, New York. He attended School Two and trained in Dunwoodie at Buckwheat Track. His first race was a 6-mile event on January 22, 1898, in Mount Vernon, New York, which he won.

On July 4, 1901, Mellor won the 25-mile marathon at the Pan-American Exposition in Buffalo, New York. His 3:16:39.4 performance in temperatures reaching 104 °F earned him an unofficial national championship and his first national victory.

== Boston Marathon ==
Mellor has been described as "one of the early stars" of the Boston Marathon. He finished in the top 10 six out of nine years between 1901 and 1909.

In the 1901 Boston Marathon, Mellor finished third behind Canadians John Caffery and William "Bill" Davis. One year later, he was victorious in the event's sixth edition with a time of 2:43:15.4 in race conditions that featured strong winds and blowing dust. In 1903, Mellor would finish nearly six minutes behind John Lordan, the 1902 runner-up, after losing the lead and walking down Heartbreak Hill. During the 1904 Boston Marathon, he would lose the lead at mile 20 and go on to finish in sixth place.

Mellor dropped out of the race at Chestnut Hill in 1905 after setting a record pace early on. Mellor was among the leaders in 1906 prior to being overtaken by David Kneeland and falling back. The next year he dropped out at Wellesley after colliding with a bicycle. He finished in 8th-place in 1908, 5th in 1909 ("the Inferno"), and 34th in the 1910 race. Ten years after he won the event, Mellor was slated to compete in the 1912 Boston Marathon, which served as the United States Olympic Trials for the 1912 Summer Olympics in Stockholm, Sweden, but he did not enter the race.

== Olympian ==
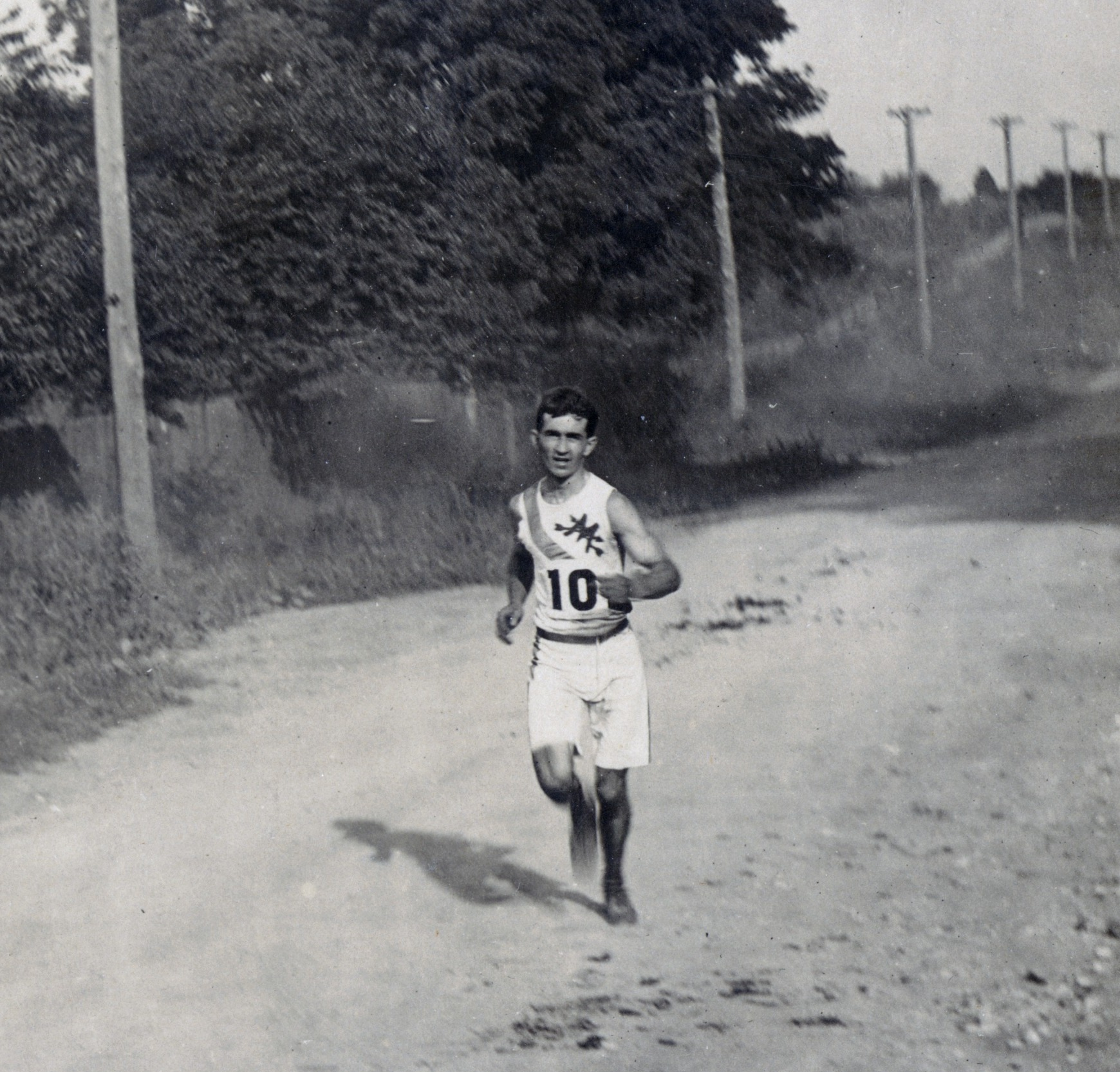
Mellor running at 1904 Olympic Marathon

An announcement in the August 6, 1904, issue of The New York Times indicated that the Metropolitan Association of the Amateur Athletic Union would hold a "special five-mile race" at Celtic Park on August 13, 1904, with the eight top finishers receiving a paid trip to compete in the marathon at the Olympic Games in St. Louis on August 30, 1904. Mellor, listed as representing the Mohawk Athletic Club, was named as one of 19 "probable competitors" in the event.

As a member of the 1904 United States Olympic Team, he was a favorite to win the marathon. According to The Olympic Marathon by David Martin and Roger Gynn, Mellor was in third at the 3-mile mark, in second at the 6-mile mark, and leading just past the halfway point. Shortly thereafter, he developed a stitch or severe cramps and was overtaken by the eventual gold medalist, American Thomas Hicks. At about 14.5 miles or 2 hours and 4 minutes into the race, Mellor retired from the race. (Note: Another account states that Mellor started out fast and developed a lead so large that he thought he had taken a wrong turn. He then backtracked only to discover that he was on the right course, but eventually failed to finish. Sports Reference also states that this is Mellor's version of what happened.)

== Other accomplishments ==
In 1904 at the Canadian Marathon of Hamilton, Ontario (actually 19 miles and 168 yards long), Mellor was paced to a course record by a horse and buggy. He also won a 10-mile race by six inches on Young’s Million Dollar Pier in Atlantic City, New Jersey, in 1905; he claimed this was his most difficulty victory. By the spring of 1909, Mellor held the American record in the twenty-mile. Among his other victories are the Newark Marathon (1907), the Bronx Marathon (1909), the Mercury Athletic Club 25-mile race (1909), and the Empire City Marathon (1909). In 1909, Mellor won an "amateur marathon" in Troy, New York, on April 28, 1909, and finished third at the Bronx Amateur Marathon on May 8.

Mellor helped establish the Yonkers Marathon with Edward Wetmore Kinsley in 1907, and finished second in the event's second running. Mellor also founded the 3.5-mile Yonkers Schoolboys Race with help from Kinsley in 1908. At various times throughout his running career, Mellor represented the Mohawk Athletic Club, the National Athletic Club, the Hollywood Inn Athletic Association (also referred to as the Hollywood Inn Athletic Club), the Yonkers Harriers, and the Mercury Club. Having competed in 29 marathons, Mellor retired from racing in 1909, but in the following year ran his tenth Boston Marathon in a time of 3:08.

Eva Florence Mellor was Sammy Mellor's wife. They had four children. He was unrelated to Charles "Chuck" Mellor, the winner of the 1925 Boston Marathon and an Olympian in 1920 and 1924.
