= Jan Mashiani =

South African long-distance runner

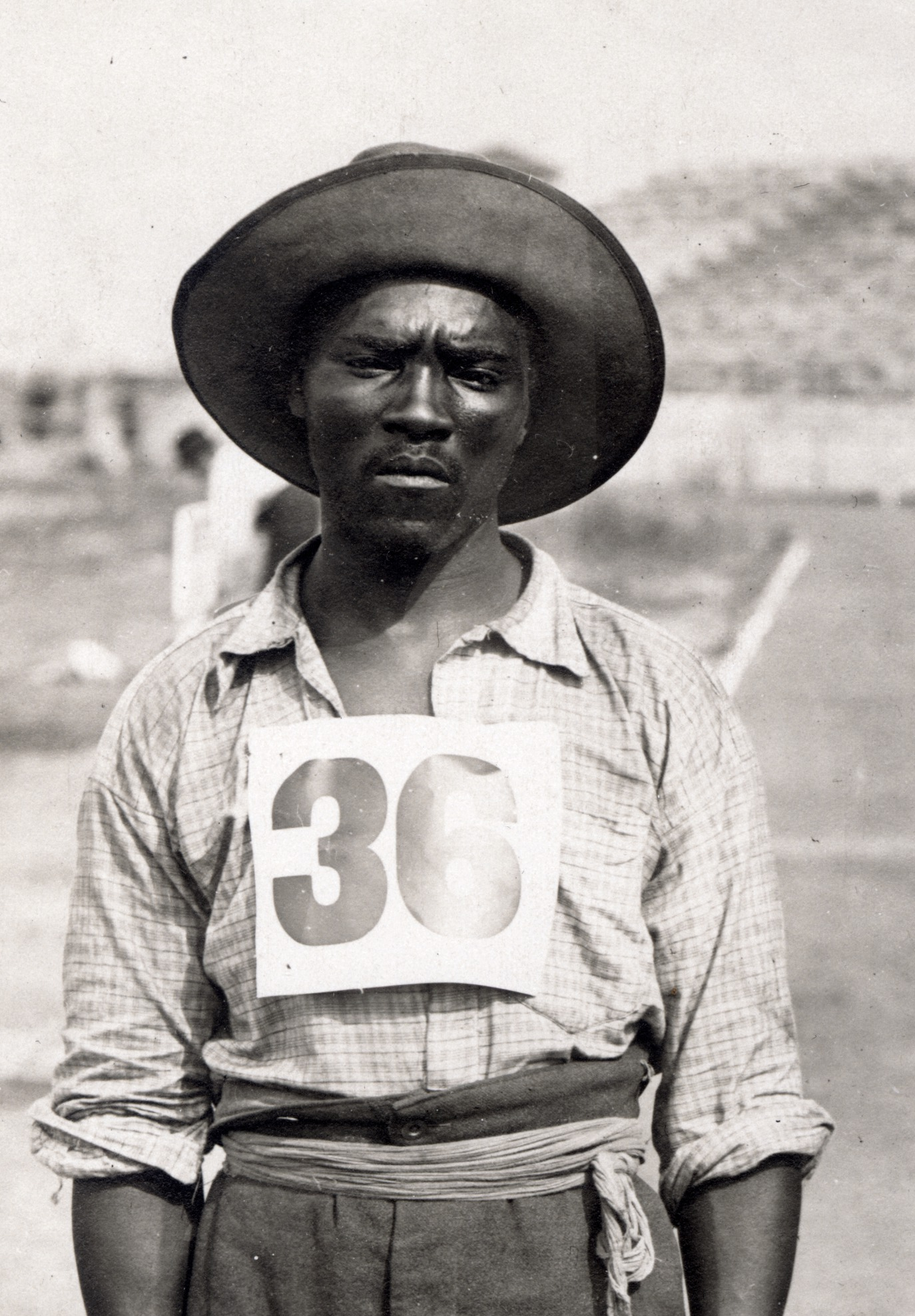
- Mashiani in 1904

Sport
- Country: Transvaal Colony
- Sport: Track and field
- Event: Marathon

Jan Mashiani was a Tswana track and field athlete from the Transvaal Colony who competed in the 1904 Summer Olympics in the marathon. He finished thirteenth of the fifteen finishers, but moved up to twelfth after Frederick Lorz was disqualified. Along with Len Taunyane, Mashiani was one of the first two black people to participate in the modern Olympic Games. He was chased off the course of the 1904 marathon by a dog, affecting his placement. Mashiani served as a dispatch runner in the Second Boer War, although there are conflicting reports on which side he served.

== See also ==
- South Africa at the 1904 Summer Olympics
