= France at the 1904 Summer Olympics =

- IOC code: FRA
- NOC: French Olympic Committee

in St. Louis
- Competitors: 1 in 1 sport
- Medals: Gold 0 Silver 0 Bronze 0 Total 0

Summer Olympics appearances (overview)
- 1896; 1900; 1904; 1908; 1912; 1920; 1924; 1928; 1932; 1936; 1948; 1952; 1956; 1960; 1964; 1968; 1972; 1976; 1980; 1984; 1988; 1992; 1996; 2000; 2004; 2008; 2012; 2016; 2020; 2024; 2028

Other related appearances
- 1906 Intercalated Games

France, the previous host of the 1900 Summer Olympics in Paris, boycotted the 1904 Summer Olympics in St. Louis, United States. Albert Corey, who was a French immigrant to the US and lived in America, won two silver medals in athletics. The International Olympic Committee attributes his silver medal in the marathon to the United States, and shows him as being part of a mixed team along with American athletes in the 4 mile team race.

== Reallocated medalists ==
Medal	Name	Sport	Event	Date	Allocated to
Silver	Albert Corey	Athletics	Men's marathon	August 30	United States

== Results by event ==
=== Athletics ===
Event	Place	Athlete	Final
Men's marathon	2nd	Albert Corey	03:34:00
