= Greece at the 1904 Summer Olympics =

- IOC code: GRE
- NOC: Committee of the Olympic Games

in St. Louis United States
- Competitors: 14 in 3 sports
- Medals Ranked 8th: Gold 1 Silver 0 Bronze 1 Total 2

Summer Olympics appearances (overview)
- 1896; 1900; 1904; 1908; 1912; 1920; 1924; 1928; 1932; 1936; 1948; 1952; 1956; 1960; 1964; 1968; 1972; 1976; 1980; 1984; 1988; 1992; 1996; 2000; 2004; 2008; 2012; 2016; 2020; 2024; 2028

Other related appearances
- 1906 Intercalated Games

Greece competed with 14 athletes at the 1904 Summer Olympics in St. Louis, United States. Greek athletes have competed in every Summer Olympic Games.

== Medalists ==
| Medal | Name | Sport | Event | Date |
|---|---|---|---|---|
| Gold | Perikles Kakousis | Weightlifting | Men's two hand lift | September 3 |
| Bronze | Nikolaos Georgantas | Athletics | Men's discus throw | September 3 |

== Results by event ==
=== Athletics ===
| Event | Place | Athlete | Final |
|---|---|---|---|
| Men's marathon | 5th | Dimitrios Veloulis | Unknown |
| Men's marathon | 10th | Christos Zechouritis | Unknown |
| Men's marathon | 14th | Andrew Oikonomou | Unknown |
| Men's marathon | — | Georgios Drosos | Did not finish |
| Men's marathon | — | Charilaos Giannakas | Did not finish |
| Men's marathon | — | Ioannis Loungitsas | Did not finish |
| Men's marathon | — | Georgios Louridas | Did not finish |
| Men's marathon | — | Petros Pipiles | Did not finish |
| Men's marathon | — | Georgios Vamkaitis | Did not finish |
| Men's shot put | — | Nikolaos Georgantas | Disqualified |
| Men's discus throw | 3rd | Nikolaos Georgantas | 37.68 metres |

=== Tug of war ===
| Event | Place | Player | Quarterfinals | Semifinals | Final | Silver medal semifinal | Silver medal match |
|---|---|---|---|---|---|---|---|
| Men's tug of war | 5th | Pan-Hellenic | Lost to SW Turnverein | did not advance | | | |

=== Weightlifting ===
| Event | Place | Lifter | Lift |
|---|---|---|---|
| Men's two hand lift | 1st | Perikles Kakousis | 111.70 |
