= Andrew Oikonomou =

Greek track and field athlete

Personal information
- Nationality: Greek

Sport
- Sport: Long-distance running
- Event: Marathon

Andreas Ioannis "Andrew" Oikonomou was a Greek track and field athlete who competed in the 1904 Summer Olympics in the marathon. He finished last of the fifteen finishers, but moved up to fourteenth after Frederick Lorz was disqualified.

== See also ==
- Greece at the 1904 Summer Olympics
