= Christos Zechouritis =

Greek track and field athlete

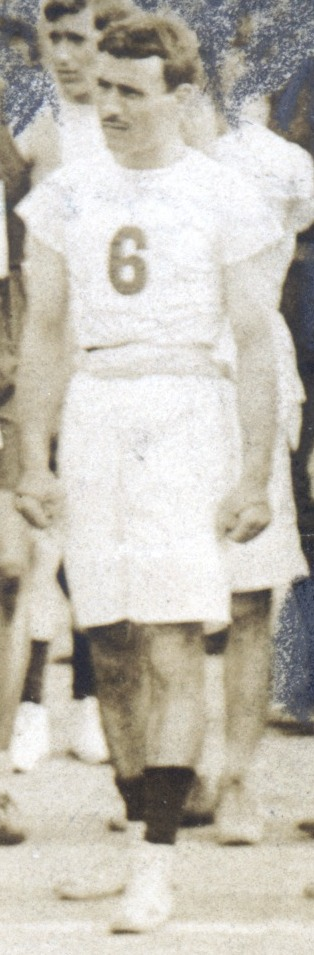
- Zechouritis at the 1904 Summer Olympics

Personal information
- Nationality: Greek

Sport
- Sport: Long-distance running
- Event: Marathon

Christos Zechouritis, also spelled Khristos Zekhouritis, was a Greek track and field athlete who competed in the 1904 Summer Olympics in the marathon. He finished eleventh of the fifteen finishers, but moved up to tenth after the American Frederick Lorz was disqualified.

== See also ==
- Greece at the 1904 Summer Olympics

== Sources ==
- Evans, Hilary; Gjerde, Arild; Heijmans, Jeroen; Mallon, Bill; et al. "Khristos Zekhouritis". Olympics at Sports-Reference.com. Sports Reference LLC. Archived from the original on 2020-04-18.
