= John Lordan =

Irish born American runner (1874 or 1876 – 1960)

John Charles Lordan (or Lorden) (Note: Lordan's first name in some sources is noted as "J.C." or "Jack" and his last as "Lorden" or "Lordon" in others. His family name is spelled Lordan on his baptismal and marriage records, but in his race results he is referred to consistently as Lorden, except for the 1904 Olympic record where it is spelled Lordon. His first child was registered as Lordan but subsequent children as Lorden.) (born June 30, 1874, or June 29, 1876 (Note: The first date is from his baptismal record, the second from his US naturalization and draft registration records.), died February 12, 1960 (Note: His name appears in the 1940 Census of the United States, and in Boston City Directories for 1947 and 1948.)) was an Irish born American long-distance runner who won the 1903 Boston Marathon and competed in the marathon at the 1904 Summer Olympics in St. Louis, Missouri.

Born in Murragh, Cork, Ireland. Lordan was trained by fellow Cantabridgian Tad Gormley. After finishing fifth in 1901 and third in 1902, Lordan finished ahead of Sammy Mellor and Michael Spring to win the 1903 Boston Marathon in a time of 2:41:29, At the 1904 Summer Olympics, condition were very warm during the marathon and Lordon was reported to have begun vomiting within the first half mile of the race. He did not finish the competition. The next year, he entered the Boston Marathon but finished twelfth in a time of 2:57:51.

He was an Irish immigrant who worked as a shipping agent for a manufacturing company in Cambridge. He trained at night only because of his job.

On August 18, 1909, Lorden raced a marathon in St. John’s, Newfoundland against his former teammate and 1898 Boston Marathon champion Ronald MacDonald on a six-lap-to-the-mile track at St. Bonaventure's College before 3,000 spectators. MacDonald was four laps behind at the twenty mile mark when Lorden "hit the wall." At the end, MacDonald finished 40 yards and ten seconds ahead of Lorden, in a time of 3:07:50 over 25 miles (40 km).

A monument was erected in his home town, Bandon, Co. Cork, to commemorate his victory in the Boston Marathon of 1903.
