= Thomas J. Kennedy =

American long-distance runner

Personal information
- Nationality: American
- Born: September 28, 1884
- Died: January 9, 1937 (aged 52)

Sport
- Sport: Long-distance running
- Event: Marathon

Thomas J. Kennedy (September 28, 1884 – January 9, 1937) was an American long-distance runner. He competed in the men's marathon at the 1904 Summer Olympics.
