= Marathon course-cutting =

Cheating at a marathon race

Marathon course-cutting occurs when runners complete less than an entire course of a marathon before going over the finish line. The standard length of a marathon course is 42.195 kilometers, about 26.2 miles. Course-cutting may be intentional or unintentional and can be achieved by various means. When done intentionally, course-cutting constitutes cheating.

Many marathon runners consider intentional course-cutting to be worse than doping, believing that those who are doping are at least trying to run the entire race.

== Notable incidents ==
In 1896, Spyridon Belokas rode in a carriage for part of the Olympic marathon in Athens after having supposedly dropped out of the race, and appeared to have finished third to seemingly complete a Greek top-three sweep. After a protest by fourth-place finisher Gyula Kellner was upheld, Belokas was disqualified.

In 1904, Frederick Lorz dropped out of the Olympic marathon in St. Louis after nine miles (14 km), then hitched a ride in a car for the next 11 miles (18 km). After the car broke down, Lorz jumped back onto the course and jogged to the finish line, where he was greeted as the winner before his deception was uncovered.

In October 1979, Rosie Ruiz rode the New York City Subway during the New York City Marathon. In doing so, she qualified for the April 1980 Boston Marathon, where she appeared to have won the women's race in a course record time. After it was discovered she had only run the last half-mile (800m) of the race, her medal was revoked and her result deleted from the records; in any case, the discovery that Ruiz had cut the course in New York would have been enough to automatically disqualify her from Boston.

In 2007, Roberto Madrazo, a Mexican presidential candidate in 2006, had his results in the Berlin Marathon deleted after his timing chip revealed Madrazo had skipped two checkpoints on the course, and had covered one nine-mile segment in 21 minutes (far faster than world record speed for such a distance).

In the 2023 Mexico City Marathon, 11,000 runners, or a third of entrants, were disqualified for course cutting. Tracking data showed that thousands of participants had not passed some of the checkpoints. Some participants reported that the trackers were faulty and did not register. In the 2017 edition, 6,000 runners were also expelled for not running the entire distance.

In July 2024, Syed Saddiq, a Malaysian member of parliament, had his results in the 113 Triathlon Desaru 2024 deleted after it was found that it was not humanly possible for him to have completed the bicycle segment as claimed. In addition, he had run the 200 km distance from his Muar constituency to the Malaysian House of Parliament across four states barely a week earlier.

== News coverage ==
In 2006, the Washington Post reported that the seventh- and eighth-place women's finishers of the 2006 Marine Corps Marathon were disqualified. Rick Nealis, the race director, had also disqualified 350 runners in the 2005 race.

In 2009, the New York Times ran an article on course-cutting, including a map of where approximately 46 runners in the 2008 New York City Marathon had left and reentered the course. “An untold number of [course-cutting] runners escape detection, marathon officials said.”

In 2010, the Chicago Tribune reported that in “the 2009 Chicago Marathon, 252 runners' times were deleted from the records, most for missing two or more timing mats in a row.”

In a 2012 New York Post article, a New York City Marathon official calculated that "each year an average of 30 to 40 are disqualified" from the marathon.

In 2012, The New Yorker ran a story on Kip Litton, a dentist from Michigan who had been disqualified from several races across the United States for course-cutting.

In 2014, Runner's World reported that the apparent women's winner of the Chickamauga Battlefield Marathon was disqualified after her splits indicated she had not run the entire race. She had appeared to win in 2:54:21 (2:55:39 gun time), but she appeared to have run the second half of the race in 47:30, which would have far exceeded the then-world record for the men's half-marathon, while her past race times were inconsistent with her supposed performance in Chickamauga.

In 2015, the New York Times reported that the original winner of the women's 40-44 category at Ironman Canada 2015 had been disqualified after evidence came to light that showed she had not run the entire race. The second-, third- and fourth-place finishers could not recall seeing her, and the runner-up went as far as to publicly confront the winner and ask when she passed her, an unusual occurrence according to Ironman Canada's regional director. The other three athletes conducted their own investigation after race officials rebuffed them, and compiled evidence that indicated that the apparent winner could not possibly have reached specific points at the times she claimed during the marathon segment of the competition. Confronted with this evidence, World Triathlon Corporation disqualified her from Ironman Canada 2015 and retroactively disqualified her from Ironman Canada 2013 and the 2014 Vancouver Triathlon, also taking the unprecedented step of banning her from all Ironman events indefinitely.

In 2015, multiple outlets reported on the case of Kendall Schler, who was stripped of her title from that year's GO! St. Louis Marathon after it was discovered she had not run the entire course. Schler wore her bib and number on her leg covered by a shirt, and admitted to removing the bib's timing strip. Schler also faked her third place finish at the previous year's event.

== See also ==
- Transponder timing
