= Guy Porter =

Guy Porter may refer to:

- Guy Porter (athlete)
- Guy Porter (rugby union)
