= South Africa at the 1904 Summer Olympics =

- IOC code: RSA (ZAF used at these Games)
- NOC: SANOC not yet formed

in St. Louis
- Competitors: 8 in 2 sports
- Medals: Gold 0 Silver 0 Bronze 0 Total 0

Summer Olympics appearances (overview)
- 1904; 1908; 1912; 1920; 1924; 1928; 1932; 1936; 1948; 1952; 1956; 1960; 1964–1988; 1992; 1996; 2000; 2004; 2008; 2012; 2016; 2020; 2024

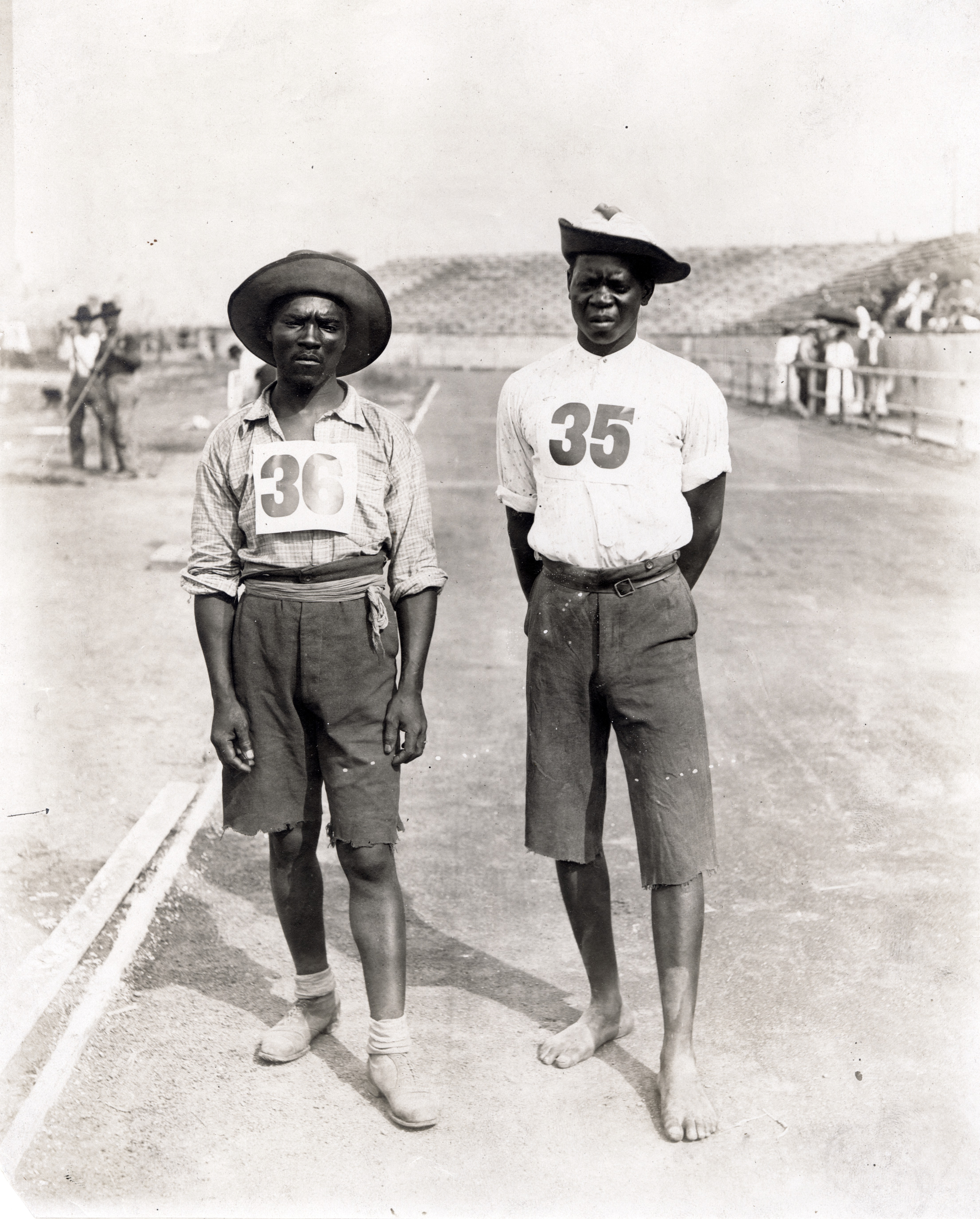
1904 Olympic Marathon participants, Len Taunyane (left) and Jan Mashiani of the Tswana ethnicity

The future Union of South Africa, 4 British colonies (Cape Colony, Colony of Natal, Orange River Colony, and Transvaal Colony) with a Boer delegation from the “Anglo-Boer War Historical Libretto”, competed at the 1904 Summer Olympics in St. Louis, United States. It was first time to compete at the Summer Olympics, including 2 Tswanas, the first ever Black Africans to compete.

== Results by event ==
=== Athletics ===
Event	Place	Athlete	Final
Men's marathon	9th	Len Tau	Unknown
Men's marathon	12th	Jan Mashiani	Unknown
Men's marathon	—	Bertie Harris	Did not finish

=== Tug of war ===
Roster

- Pieter Hillense
- Pieter Lombard
- Johannes Schutte
- Paulus Visser
- Christopher Walker

Event	Place	Player	Quarterfinals	Semifinals	Final	Silver medal semifinal	Silver medal match
Men's tug of war	5th	Boers	Lost to Milwaukee Athletic Club	did not advance			
