= Rosie Ruiz =

American fraudster (1953–2019)

Personal information
- Born: June 21, 1953 Havana, Cuba
- Died: July 8, 2019 (aged 66) Lake Worth Beach, Florida, US
- Education: Wayne State College
- Height: 5 ft 3 in (1.60 m)
- Spouse: Aicaro Vivas (m. 1984; div. 1986)
- Life partner: Margarita Alvarez (1988–2014)

Sport
- Country: Cuba
- Sport: Track and field
- Rank: DQ (Disqualified)
- Events: 1979 New York City Marathon; 1980 Boston Marathon

Rosie M. Vivas (née Ruiz; June 21, 1953 – July 8, 2019) was a fraudster who, among other schemes, was declared the winner in the female category for the 84th Boston Marathon in 1980, only to have her title stripped eight days after the race when it was discovered that she had not run the entire course. She is believed to have jumped onto the course about a half-mile before the finish.

== Early life and education ==
Ruiz was born in Havana, Cuba, and moved to Memphis, Florida, with her family in 1962 when she was eight years old. After immigrating to the United States, Ruiz was separated from her mother and lived with aunts, uncles, and cousins in Hollywood, Florida. In 1972, she graduated from South Broward High School and then attended Wayne State College in Nebraska. She graduated with a degree in music in 1977.

== New York City Marathon ==
She moved to New York City in the 1970s, eventually finding work with Metal Traders, a commodities firm. In 1979, she qualified for the New York City Marathon and was credited with a time of 2:56:29, the 11th woman overall — enough for her to qualify for the Boston Marathon.

Ruiz's application for the NYC marathon arrived after the cut-off date for the race, but she received special dispensation from the New York Road Runners due to her claim that she was dying of brain cancer.

After the 1980 Boston Marathon, New York City Marathon officials investigated Ruiz's run and concluded that she cheated and did not run the entire course, so on April 25, 1980, she was retroactively disqualified from the race.

Freelance photographer Susan Morrow reported meeting Ruiz on the subway during the New York City Marathon and accompanying her from the subway to the race. She lost touch with Ruiz after that, but came forward when the news of Ruiz's dubious Boston win broke. According to Morrow, she met Ruiz on the subway and together they walked a distance to the finishing area, where Ruiz identified herself as an injured runner. She was escorted to a first aid station and volunteers marked her down as having completed the marathon, thus qualifying her for the Boston Marathon.

New York City Marathon officials launched an investigation and could not find any sign of Ruiz near the finish line. On April 25, based on this and other evidence, the games committee of the New York City Marathon retroactively disqualified Ruiz from the 1979 race, with marathon director Fred Lebow saying she could not possibly have run the entire course.

== Boston Marathon ==
On April 21, 1980, Ruiz appeared to win the Boston Marathon's female category with a time of 2:31:56. Her time would have been the fastest female time in Boston Marathon history as well as the third-fastest female time ever recorded in any marathon.

However, suspicions mounted about Ruiz almost from the beginning. Men's winner Bill Rodgers, who had just won his third straight Boston Marathon, noticed that Ruiz could not recall things that most runners would know by heart, such as her split times. (Note: "Split times" refers to a competitor's self-measured timekeeping statistics during a race — examples might include the time it took to run the first 5 or 10 miles (or kilometers), or whether a competitor had run the first half of a race faster than the latter half (known as "positive splits") or vice-versa (known as "negative split"), and by how much, etc.) When former champion marathoner Kathrine Switzer interviewed Ruiz and asked her if her dramatic improvement had come from interval training, Ruiz responded "I'm not sure what intervals are. What are they?", revealing what many considered a suspicious lack of knowledge for an elite runner. Other observers noticed that Ruiz was not panting or coated in sweat, and her thighs were less lean and muscular than would be expected for a world-class runner. She later released stress-test results showing her resting heart rate as 76. Most female marathoners have a resting heart rate in the 50s or lower.

In addition, her time of 2:31:56 was an unusual improvement, more than 25 minutes ahead of her reported time in the New York City Marathon six months earlier. When asked by a reporter why she did not seem fatigued after the grueling race, she said, "I got up with a lot of energy this morning." Some female competitors thought it was odd that, when asked what she had noticed about the suburb of Wellesley while running through it, she did not mention the students of Wellesley College, who traditionally cheer loudly for the first female runners as they pass the campus.

Most seriously, no other runners could recall seeing her. Jacqueline Gareau was told that she was leading the race at the 18-mile mark, while Patti Lyons was told she was second at the 17-mile mark. Ruiz could not have passed either of them without being seen. Several spotters at checkpoints throughout the course also did not remember seeing her in the first group of women. In addition, she did not appear in any pictures or video footage.

Two Harvard students, John Faulkner and Sola Mahoney, recalled seeing Ruiz burst out of a crowd of spectators on Commonwealth Avenue, half a mile from the finish.

A few days after New York City Marathon officials disqualified Ruiz, the Boston Athletic Association (BAA) disqualified Ruiz from the Boston Marathon. While New York's action seemed to have automatically disqualified Ruiz from Boston as well, Boston officials wanted to do their own investigation before taking action. Gareau was declared the female winner, with a time of 2:34:28—at the time, the fastest recorded for a woman in the Boston Marathon. Lyons was moved up to second; her time of 2:35:08 was the fastest ever recorded for an American woman in a marathon at that time.

During a CTV interview in July 2019, Gareau said that she felt pity for Ruiz, but had no ill feelings toward her. In an interview with the National Post, Gareau forgave Ruiz stating, "I forgave her completely. It's not a big thing for me".

== Later life and death ==
In 1982, Ruiz was arrested for embezzling $60,000 (equivalent to $200,000 in 2025) from a real estate company where she worked. She spent one week in jail and was sentenced to five years' probation. She then moved back to South Florida, where she was arrested in 1983 for her involvement in a cocaine deal. She was sentenced to three years' probation. In January 1984, Ruiz married Aicaro Vivas, had three children, and divorced in August 1986 but kept the Vivas surname thereafter. In 1988, she met Margarita Alvarez at a party, who would be her partner for the next 26 years. In April 1993, she was working in West Palm Beach as a client representative for a medical laboratory company.

As of 2000, Ruiz still maintained that she ran the entire 1980 Boston Marathon. However, an acquaintance, Steve Marek, said that she admitted to him a few months after the race that she had cheated, recalling that "she jumped out of the crowd, not knowing that the first woman hadn't gone by yet. Believe me, she was as shocked as anyone when she came in first."

Ruiz died of cancer at age 66 on July 8, 2019, in Lake Worth Beach.

== See also ==
- Frederick Lorz
- Marathon course-cutting – Cheating at a marathon race
- Charles Moses (sprinter)
- Moli Yeski Yusef
