= John Foy =

American distance runner

John Joseph Foy (March 26, 1882 – February 10, 1960) was an American track and field athlete who competed in the 1904 Summer Olympics.

Foy was born in Cootehill, Ireland and immigrated to New York, where he competed for the Star Athletic Club. He died in Elmhurst, Queens, New York in 1960, aged 77.

He was the winner of the Pastime Athletic Club Open Handicap cross country run in 1902.

In 1904 he did not finish in the men's marathon.
