= Harry Devlin (disambiguation) =

Harry Devlin is the name of

- Harry Devlin (1918 – 2001), American artist and painter
- Harry Devlin (athlete) (fl. 1904), American marathon runner
- Harry Devlin (fictional detective), character created by Martin Edwards
