= Andarín Carvajal =

Cuban marathon runner (1875–1949)

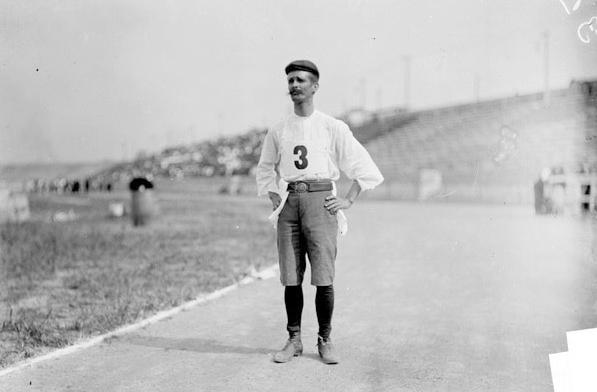
- Carvajal in 1904

Personal information
- Full name: Félix de la Caridad Carvajal y Soto
- Born: 18 March 1875 San Antonio de los Baños, Captaincy General of Cuba, Spanish Empire
- Died: 27 January 1949 (aged 73) Havana, Cuba
- Occupation: Mailman
- Height: 155 cm (5 ft 1 in)
- Weight: 43 kg (95 lb)

Sport
- Sport: Long-distance running
- Event: Marathon

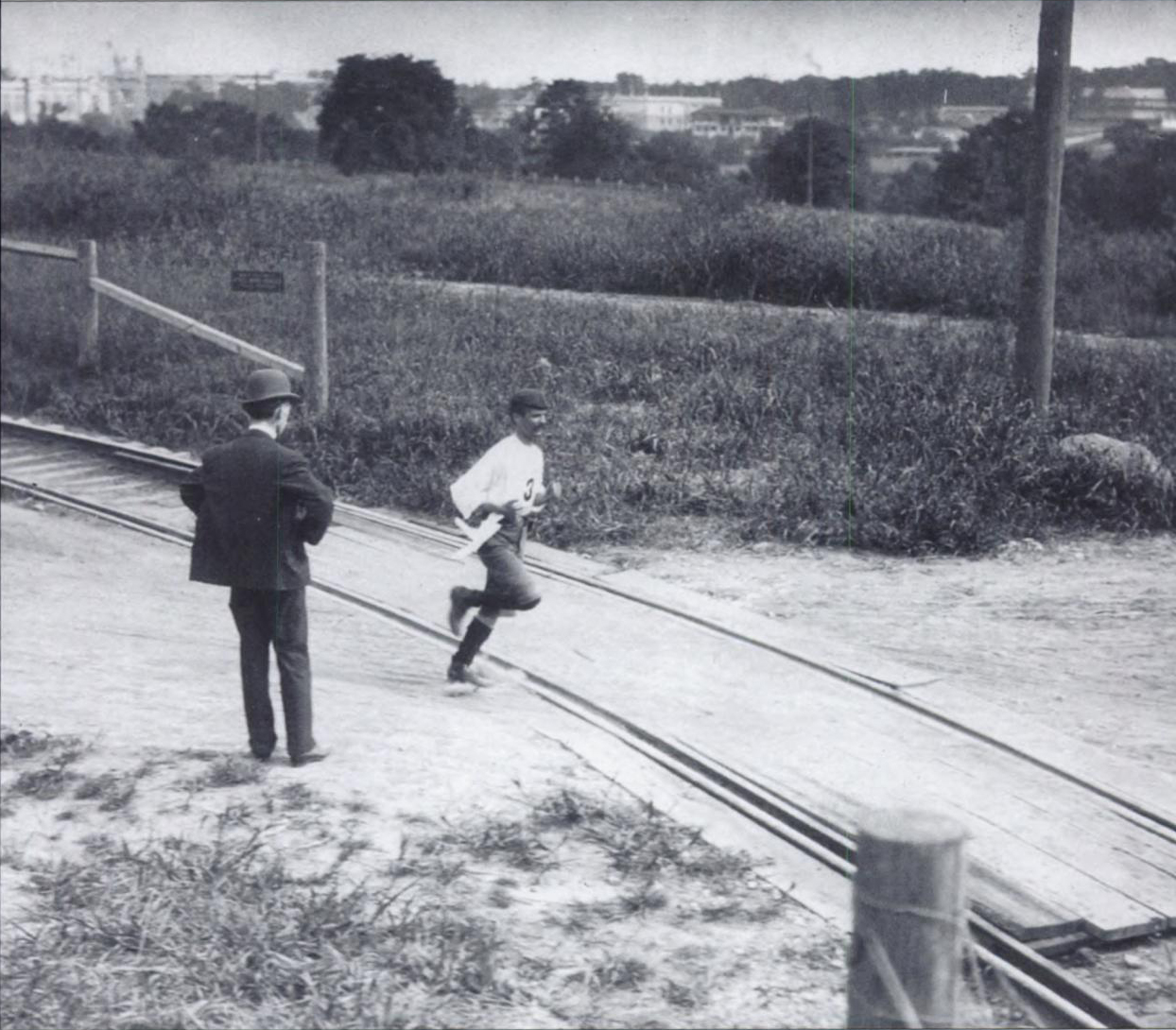
Andarín Carvajal running during the Olympic Marathon

Félix de la Caridad Carvajal y Soto, known as Andarín Carvajal (18 March 1875 – 27 January 1949) was a Cuban mailman and long-distance runner who competed in the 1904 Summer Olympics. Competing in the Olympic marathon, Carvajal placed fourth in a race beset by poor planning in which he took a nap to recover from eating rotten apples.

== Career ==
Carvajal was born in San Antonio de los Baños and lived in poverty his entire life before his death in Havana. During his life he was a mailman who performed walking and running exhibitions in Cuba (including a journey across the full length of the island).

Carvajal traveled to the United States to compete in the Olympic marathon at the 1904 Summer Olympics in St. Louis, Missouri, but lost all of his money gambling in New Orleans, Louisiana and was forced to hitchhike and walk the rest of the way. He arrived at the race dressed in street clothes and hastily cut around the legs of his trousers to make them more like shorts. Carvajal performed well in the race despite stopping to chat with spectators and snatching some peaches from a spectator's car. Later in the race he saw an apple orchard and stopped to eat some apples which turned out to be rotten. After stopping to nap and recover, Carvajal rallied to finish fourth.

Carvajal returned to St. Louis the following year to run for the Missouri Athletic Club in the inaugural All-Western Marathon, where he finished third, in a time of 3:44.

Carvajal was selected to represent Cuba in the 1906 Olympic Marathon at Athens, Greece, with his expenses funded by the Cuban government. However, he disappeared after landing in Italy, and never arrived in Athens. He was thought to be dead, and his obituary was published in the Cuban newspapers, but he later returned to Havana on a Spanish steamer. He then turned professional and would go on to defeat American distance runner Henry W. Shelton in a six-hour race in 1907. On 8 May 1909, he participated in a Marathon Derby on a six-laps-per-mile track at the Polo Grounds in New York City with an international field of twelve other professional marathon runners, the most notable being Dorando Pietri. Carvajal was quickly lapped by the leaders after they had completed the first mile in 5:02. The race was won by Henri St. Yves of France in a time of 2:44:05; Carvajal finished, but was never out of last place.

== Legacy ==
The Spanish language book Félix Carvajal, corredor de maratón, by Bernardo José Mora, was written on his life.

A 1956 episode of Telephone Time entitled Felix the Fourth featured Pedro Gonzalez Gonzalez in the title role.
