= Dimitrios Veloulis =

Greek track and field athlete

Dimitrios Veloulis (Greek: Δημήτριος Βελούλης) was a Greek track and field athlete who competed in the 1904 Summer Olympics in the marathon. He finished in fifth place.

== See also ==
- Greece at the 1904 Summer Olympics

== Sources ==
- Evans, Hilary; Gjerde, Arild; Heijmans, Jeroen; Mallon, Bill; et al. "Dimitrios Veloulis". Olympics at Sports-Reference.com. Sports Reference LLC. Archived from the original on 18 April 2020.
