= John Furla =

American distance runner

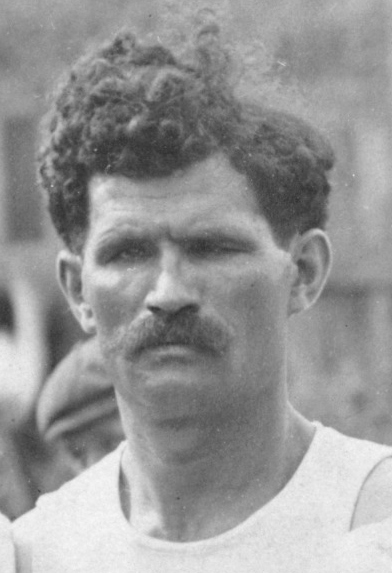

Personal information
- Nationality: Greek-American
- Born: August 15, 1870
- Died: May 31, 1938 (aged 67)

Sport
- Sport: Long-distance running
- Event: Marathon

John Furla (August 15, 1870 – May 31, 1938) was a Greek-American track and field athlete who competed in the 1904 Summer Olympics. In 1904 he was thirteenth in marathon competition.

Furla was born in Greece, and emigrated to the United States settling in Chicago in about 1893.

Furla, a St. Louis resident who sold fruit at the World's Fair, later owned the city's largest fruit wholesale company.
