= Frank Devlin (disambiguation) =

Frank Devlin (1900–1988) was an Irish badminton player.

Frank Devlin may also refer to:

- Frank Devlin (athlete) (1884–1938), American athlete
- Frank R. Devlin (1867–1945), American politician
