= Albert Corey =

French long-distance runner

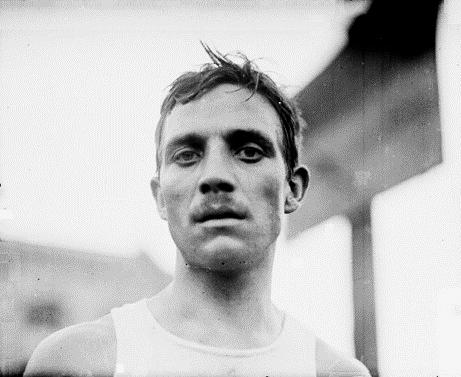
- Corey in 1905

Personal information
- Full name: Albert Louis Corey
- Born: 16 April 1878 Meursault, France
- Died: 3 August 1926 (aged 48) Paris, France
- Height: 169 cm (5 ft 7 in)

Sport
- Sport: Road running
- Event: Marathon
Medal record
Olympic Games
Representing United States
| Silver medal – second place | 1904 St Louis | Marathon |
| Silver medal – second place | 1904 St Louis | 4 mile team race |

Albert Louis Corey (16 April 1878 – 3 August 1926) was a French athlete who competed at the 1904 Summer Olympics held in St. Louis, Missouri, United States. He won a silver medal in the marathon race and also won a silver medal as a member of the Chicago Athletic Association team in the four-mile team race.

In the early 2020s, Corey's story was researched by Meursault municipal councillor and amateur historian Clément Genty, who traced period newspaper reports and lobbied Olympic authorities regarding Corey's nationality. In 2023, a separate challenge to the marathon's final classification was raised following the discovery of period American newspaper reports; the International Society of Olympic Historians subsequently credited the individual silver medal to France rather than the United States on its Olympedia database.

Genty has further argued, based on his own research, that the marathon's final classification should be revised. Citing the two official 1905 reports of the race — those of race director Charles J. P. Lucas and of James Edward Sullivan for the Spalding's Athletic Almanac — Genty contends that winner Thomas Hicks received a car escort and was physically carried by two officials over a substantial part of the final stretch, in addition to being administered strychnine mixed with egg white and brandy, despite race organisers having explicitly announced before the start that no assistance to runners would be permitted. · Drawing a parallel with the disqualification of Frederick Lorz for comparable assistance, Genty has argued that the gold medal should be retroactively awarded to Corey. In 2023, Genty petitioned the International Olympic Committee's Olympic Studies Centre for a formal review of the result; the Centre replied that it was not competent to revisit decisions made on the field of play or to revise the classification of a competition held nearly 120 years earlier. Genty has since raised the possibility of an appeal to the Court of Arbitration for Sport or a diplomatic approach through the French National Olympic and Sports Committee. As of 2026, the official classification of the event has not been revised.

== Biography ==
The Games report refers to Corey as a "Frenchman wearing the colors of the Chicago Athletic Association". Corey was a French immigrant to the United States, who lived in the United States and did not have the right papers. The International Olympic Committee attributes his medals in the marathon and the four mile team race to the United States.

Competing for the First Regiment Athletic Association of Chicago on June 6, 1908, Corey finished ahead of Roy Kemper and teammate Alexander Thibeau to win the 15-mile St. Louis Marathon.
