= Harry Brawley =

American marathon runner

Harry Alexander Brawley (October 7, 1876 in Roxbury, Massachusetts – February 11, 1954 in Winthrop, Massachusetts) was an American track and field athlete who competed in the 1904 Summer Olympics. In 1904 he was seventh in marathon competition.
