= Michael Spring =

American distance runner

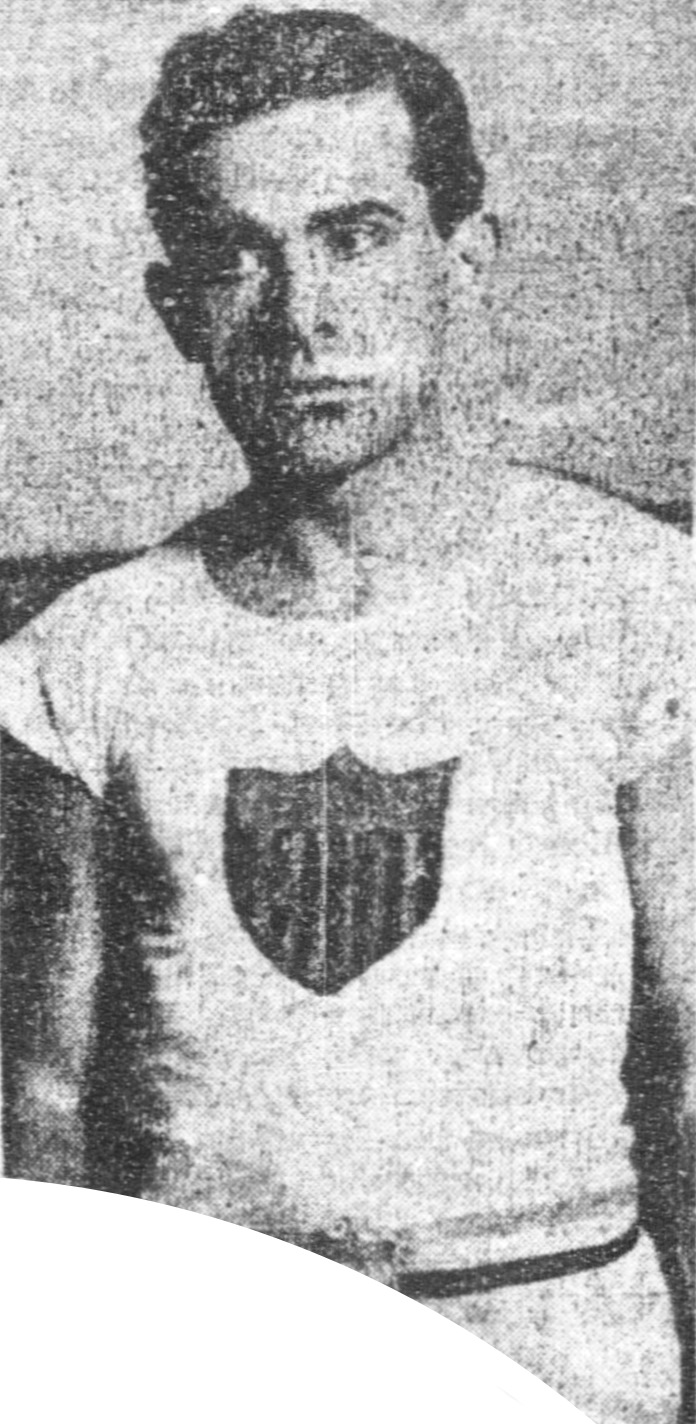

Personal information
- Nationality: American
- Born: December 14, 1879
- Died: March 17, 1970 (aged 90)

Sport
- Sport: Long-distance running
- Event: Marathon

Michael Spring (December 14, 1879 – March 17, 1970) was an American track and field athlete. Spring won the 1904 Boston Marathon, after finishing third in 1903.

An announcement in the August 6, 1904 issue of The New York Times indicated that the Metropolitan Association of the Amateur Athletic Union would hold a "special five-mile race" at Celtic Park on August 13, 1904, with the eight top finishers receiving a paid trip to compete in the marathon at the Olympic Games in St. Louis on August 30, 1904. Spring, listed as representing the Pastime Athletic Club, was named as one of 19 "probable competitors" in the event.

At the 1904 Summer Olympics, Spring competed in the marathon but did not finish the event. Two years later, Spring again competed at the Olympic in 1906. He did not finish in marathon competition.
