= William Garcia =

American long-distance runner (1877–1951)

Personal information
- Nationality: American
- Born: William Rosenbir Garcia; March 28, 1877 Oakland, California
- Died: August 12, 1951 (aged 74)

Sport
- Sport: Long-distance running
- Event: Marathon

William Rosenbir Garcia (March 28, 1877 – August 12, 1951) was an American track and field athlete who competed in the 1904 Summer Olympics.

In 1904, he did not finish the marathon competition. He made it 19 miles (31 km) before he started coughing up blood on the side of the street. If a passing bystander had not found him, Garcia may have died.
