= David Kneeland =

American marathon runner

Personal information
- Nationality: American
- Born: David Joseph Kneeland; December 3, 1881 San Francisco, California
- Died: November 15, 1948 (aged 66) Winthrop, Massachusetts

Sport
- Sport: Long-distance running
- Event: Marathon

David Joseph Kneeland (December 3, 1881 – November 15, 1948) was an American track and field athlete who competed in the 1904 Summer Olympics. In 1904 he was sixth in marathon competition. He was born in San Francisco, California, and died in Winthrop, Massachusetts.
