= Alexander Thibeau =

American long-distance runner

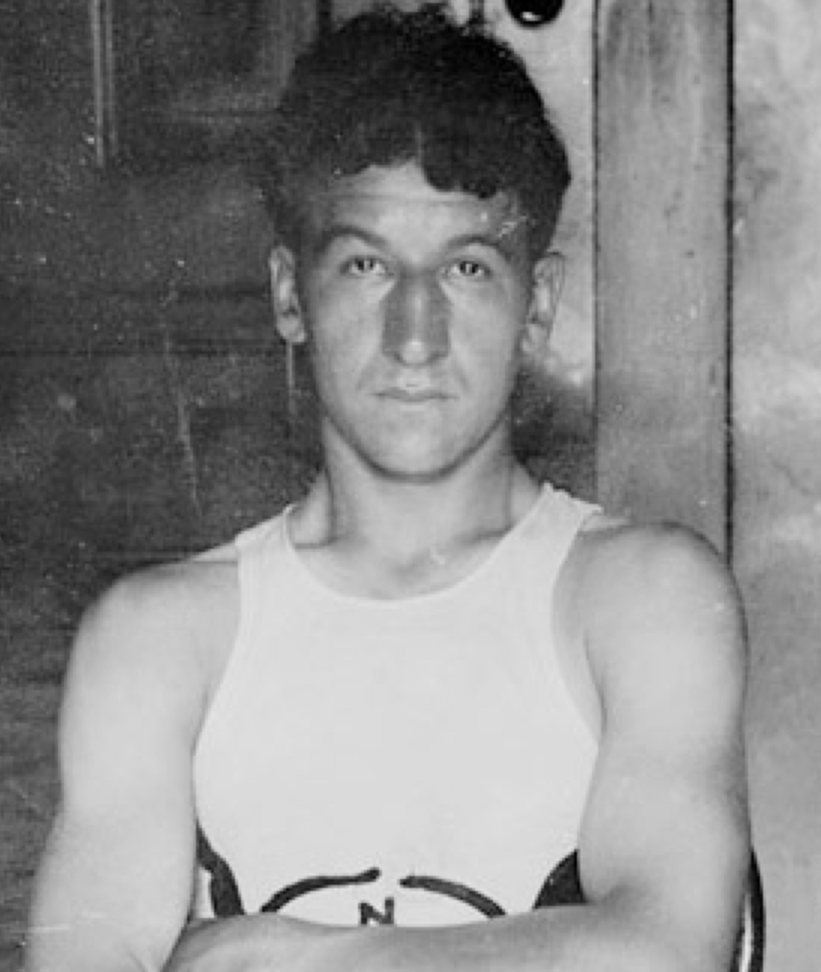
- Alexander Thibeau in 1906

Personal information
- Full name: Alexander Thibeau
- Nationality: American

Sport
- Sport: Running
- Event: Marathon
- Club: First Regiment Athletic Association of Chicago

Alexander Thibeau was an American long-distance runner who, along with Albert Corey and Sidney Hatch, was one of Chicago's most prominent marathoners in the early 1900s. Thibeau was one of twelve athletes selected to represent the United States in the marathon at the 1908 Summer Olympics in London, but he did not start the race.

Thibeau placed in the top three of the Missouri Athletic Club's All-Western Marathon from 1906 through 1909. He finished second to Sidney Hatch in 1906 (2:47:22) and 1907 (2:48:40), third to Hatch and Joseph Forshaw in 1908 (2:37:46), and second to Joseph Erxleben in 1909 (2:55:25).

On June 30, 1906, 50,000 spectators saw Thibeau finish three minutes behind Thomas J. Hicks to place second in a marathon at an Amateur Athletic Union meet in Chicago.

From 1905 to the early 1920s, the Illinois Athletic Club of Chicago organized what has been recognized as an early precursor to the Chicago Marathon. On October 1, 1906, Thibeau finished fifth after he and Albert Corey were expected to contend for victory in the 25-mile marathon from Ravinia Park in Highland Park to Grant Park, Chicago. In the following year's event, William Lindquist led the field of 37 runners but faltered after "hitting the wall". Thibeau employed a steady pace to overtake Lindquist and claimed victory by finishing six minutes ahead of Corey in a time of 3:00:10.

On May 2, 1908, in St. Louis, Missouri, Thibeau placed third behind Hatch and Forshaw with a 2:37:46 performance in a 25-mile marathon to earn a spot on the United States Olympic Team. He finished third in the 15-mile St. Louis Marathon on June 6, 1908. The official report of the 1908 Summer Olympics indicates that Thibeau was one of twelve athletes selected to represent the United States in the marathon held on July 24, 1908, but there is no record that he participated in the event.

Thibeau competed in a marathon in Chicago won by Hatch on January 16, 1909, then was reported to have broken Matthew Maloney's amateur indoor marathon record four weeks later in the same city. His time of 2:52:51 was noted to be two minutes faster than the mark set by Maloney. (Note: The Association of Road Racing Statisticians does not include Thibeau's mark in their records for fastest indoor marathon, and they also note several times faster set prior to his performance.) Thibeau finished second to Hatch at another indoor marathon in March 1909 at Riverview Rink in Chicago.

On May 24, 1909, Thibeau turned professional in order to compete for $10,000 in prize money at an "international marathon derby" in Chicago on featuring eight of the "world's best long distance runners". In addition to Thibeau, the field of eight included Fred Appleby of England; Johnny Hayes and Matt Maloney of the United States; Canadian Indians Tom Longboat and Fred Simpson; Henry St. Yves of France; and John Svanberg of Sweden. On May 29, 1909, the 26 mile 385 yard race was won by Svanberg in a time of 2:48:12, followed by Hayes, Appleby, Maloney, and Simpson. Thibeau finished sixth ahead of St. Yves and Longboat who dropped out of the race. Three days later on June 1, 1909, in St. Paul, Minnesota, Thibeau lost to Hayes in a 10-mile race by three-fourths of a lap.

Thibeau competed for a number of different amateur athletic clubs including the First Regiment Athletic Association of Chicago and the Northwest Skating Club. He was reported to have been from Canada and a French-Canadian.
