= Charilaos Giannakas =

Greek long-distance runner

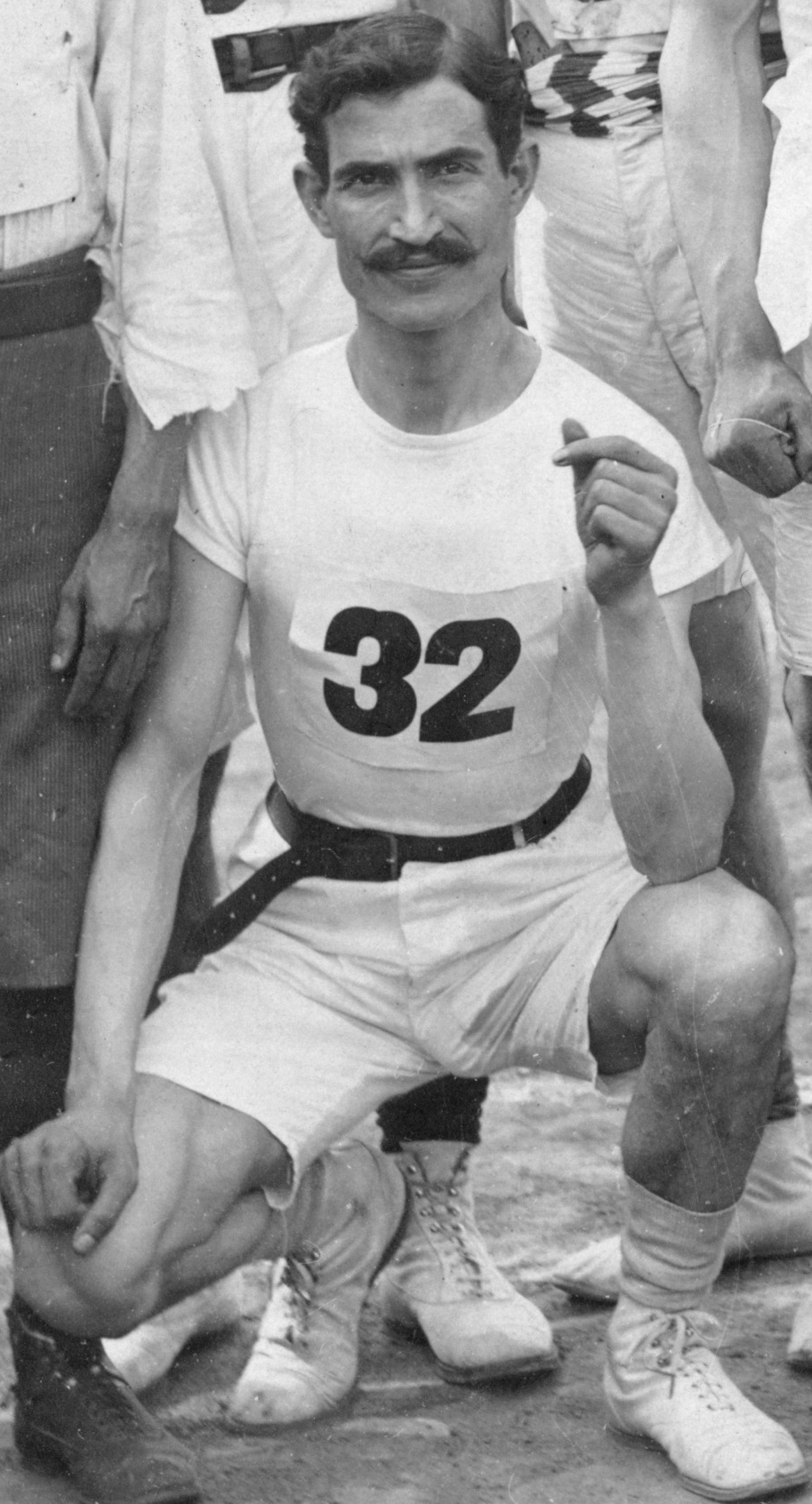
- Giannakas in 1904

Personal information
- Nationality: Greek

Sport
- Sport: Long-distance running
- Event: Marathon

Charilaos Giannakas was a Greek long-distance runner. He competed in the men's marathon at the 1904 Summer Olympics. His height then was 176 cm and his body weight 67 kg.
