= Guy Porter (athlete) =

American track and field athlete

Guy Jonathan Porter (September 8, 1884 – February 22, 1951) was an American track and field athlete who competed in the 1904 Summer Olympics. In 1904 he did not finish in marathon competition.
