= Len Taunyane =

South African athlete

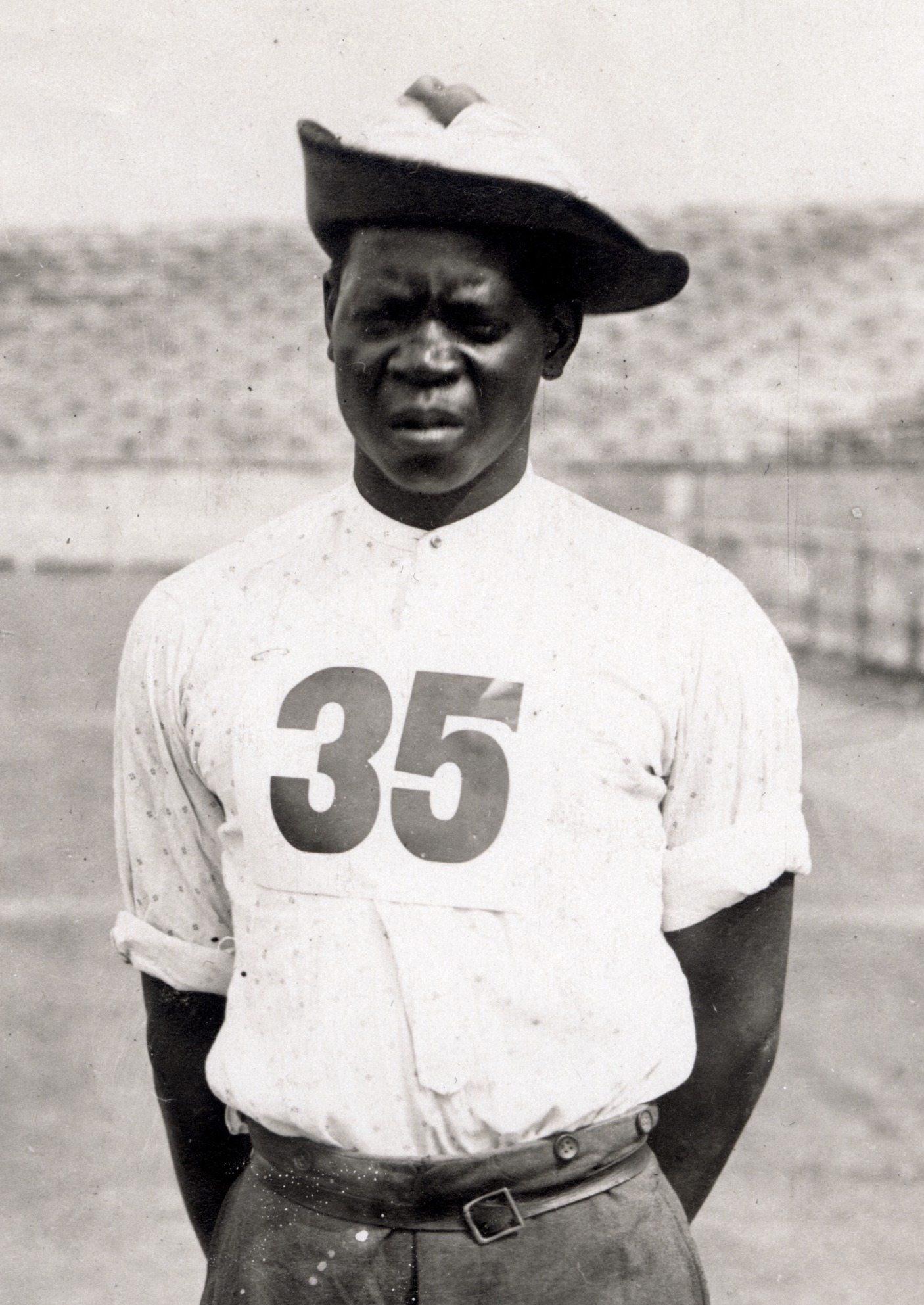
- Taunyane in 1904

Personal information
- Nickname: Len Tau

Sport
- Country: Orange River Colony
- Sport: Track and field
- Event: Marathon

Len Taunyane ([lɪn tauˈɲanɪ] fl. 1880s – after 1904) was a track and field athlete from the Orange River Colony who competed in the 1904 Summer Olympics in the Men's marathon, and was therefore one of the first two black people to participate in the modern Olympic Games, along with Jan Mashiani.

== Early life ==
Taunyane was a member of the Tswana people and a veteran of the Second Boer War, having served as a dispatch runner, although there are conflicting reports on which side he served. He travelled to the United States in 1904 to appear in the Boer War Exhibition at the St Louis World's Fair. There he participated in twice-daily re-enactments of the Battle of Colenso and the Battle of Paardeberg.

== 1904 Marathon ==
The 1904 Marathon was a largely informal affair, run on an unsuitable course and over roads so dusty that it caused many of the athletes to collapse. Taunyane entered the race at the last minute, as a Tswana from the Orange River Colony. His name was mispronounced by some officials.

Taunyane likely ran barefoot, and he finished in ninth place out of a field of 32 and 14 finishers.
