= Georgios Vamkaitis =

Greek marathon runner

Giorgios Vamkaitis was a Greek marathoner who competed in the 1904 Olympic Games in St. Louis, USA. He did not complete the 1904 Olympic marathon, one that was marked by bizarre results.
