= Frank Devlin (athlete) =

American athletics competitor

Frank Patrick "Dick" Devlin (November 10, 1884 in New York, New York – January 6, 1938 in Bronx, New York) was an American track and field athlete who competed in the 1904 Summer Olympics in the marathon. He finished twelfth of the fifteen finishers, but moved up to eleventh after Frederick Lorz was disqualified.

== See also ==
- United States at the 1904 Summer Olympics
