= Athletics at the 1904 Summer Olympics – Men's marathon =

Men's marathon at the Games of the III Olympiad
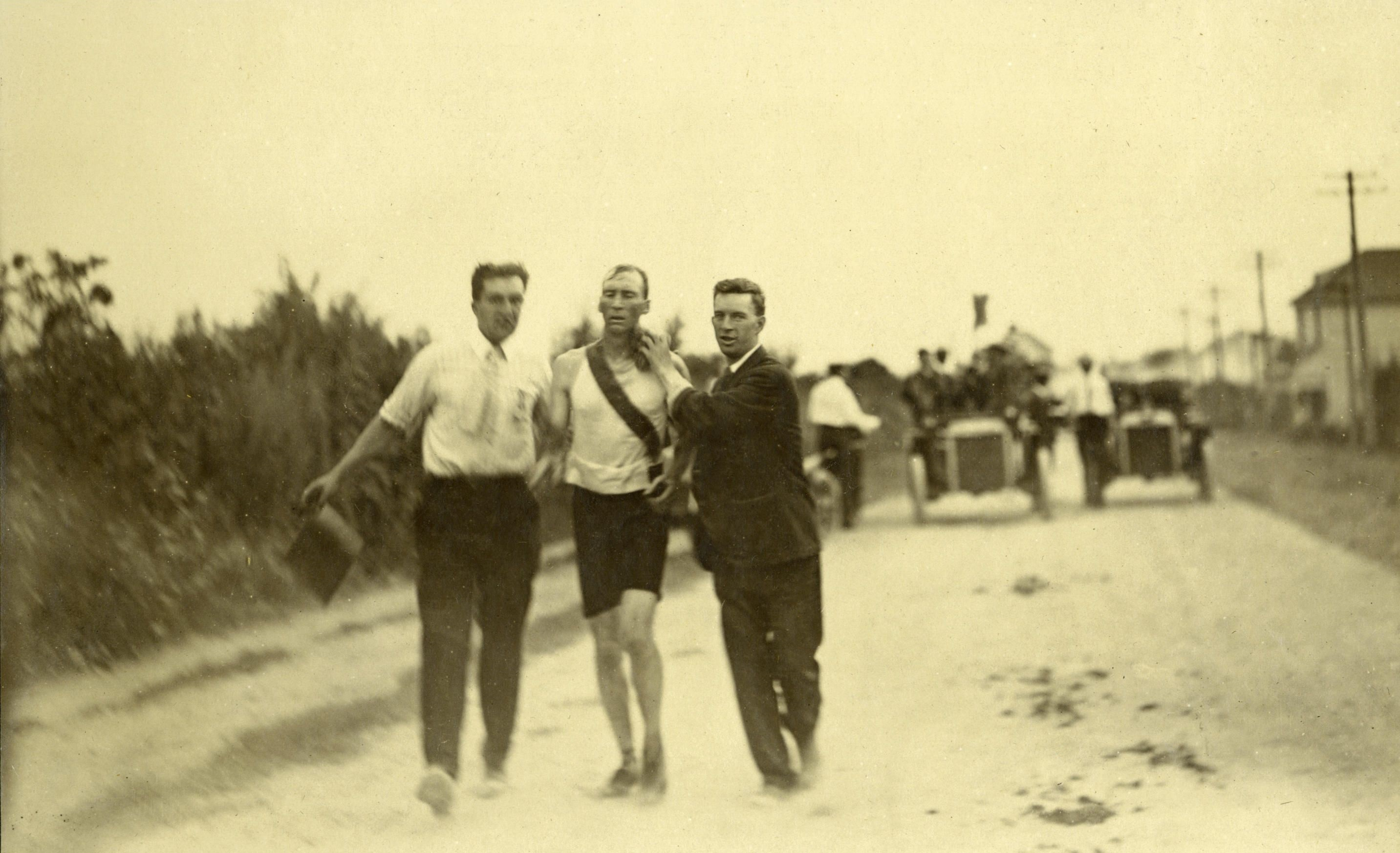
- Thomas Hicks and supporters
- Venue: St. Louis
- Dates: August 30, 1904
- Competitors: 32 from 7 nations
- Winning time: 3:28:53

Medalists
1st place, gold medalist(s)		Thomas Hicks; United States
2nd place, silver medalist(s)		Albert Corey; United States
3rd place, bronze medalist(s)		Arthur Newton; United States

The men's marathon at the 1904 Summer Olympics in St. Louis, Missouri, United States, took place on August 30 of that year, over a distance of 24 miles 1500 yards (40 km).

The race was run during the hottest part of the day on dusty country roads with minimal water supply. While 32 athletes coming from seven nations (the United States, France, Cuba, Greece, the Orange River Colony, Great Britain, and Canada) competed, only 14 managed to complete the race, which was a bizarre affair due to poor organization and officiating.

Frederick Lorz was greeted as the apparent winner, but was later disqualified as he had hitched a ride in a car for part of the race. The actual winner, Thomas Hicks, was near collapse and hallucinating by the end of the race, a side effect of being administered brandy, raw eggs, and strychnine by his trainers. The fourth-place finisher, Andarín Carvajal, took a nap during the race after eating spoiled apples.

== Background ==
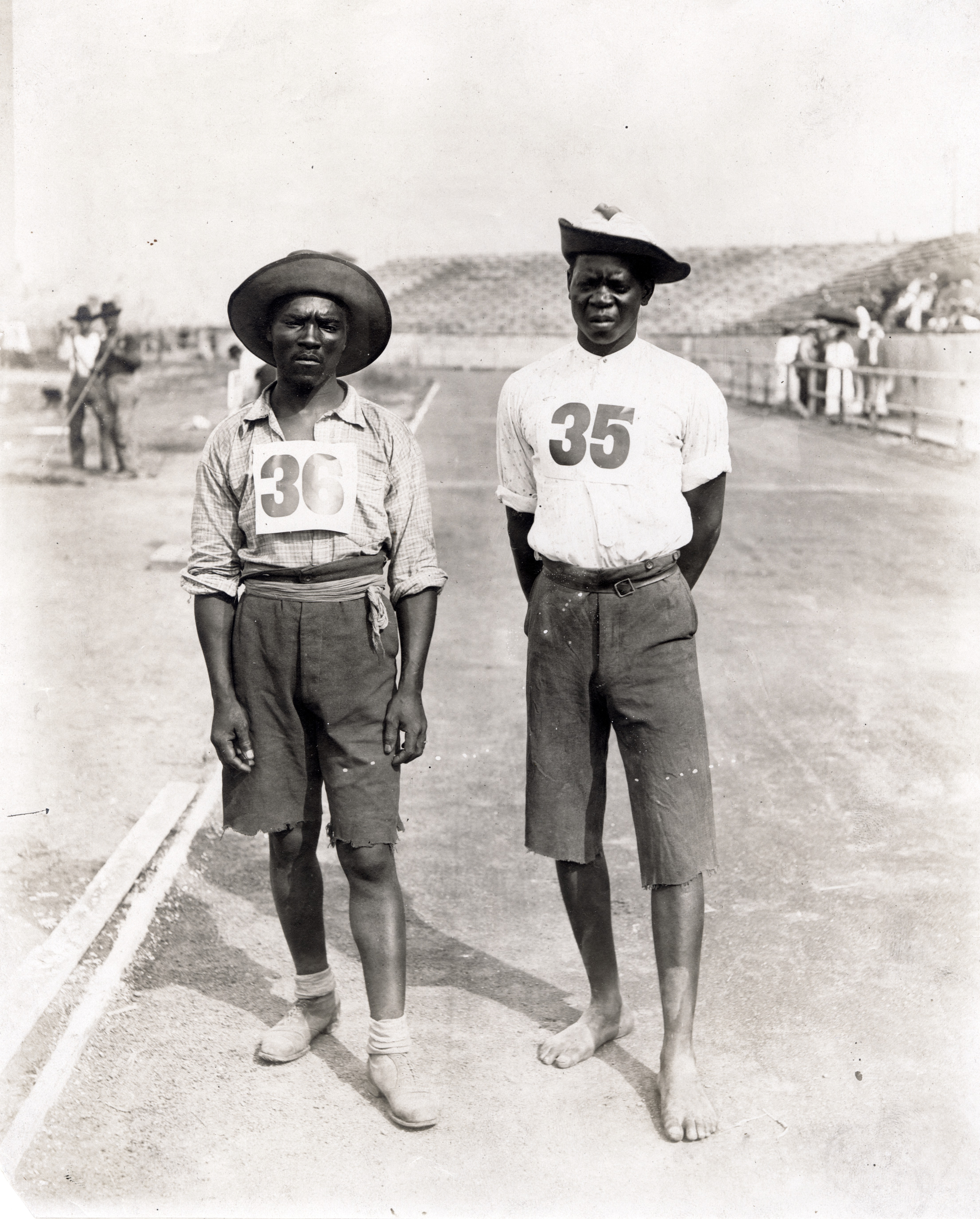
Mashiani (left) and Taunyane before the race

This was the third appearance of the marathon event, which is one of 12 athletics events to have been held at every Summer Olympics. Arthur L. Newton of the United States was the only runner from 1900 to return, while other significant American runners included the winners of the past three Boston Marathons: 1902 winner Sammy Mellor, 1903 winner John Lordon, and 1904 winner Michael Spring.

Cuba and South Africa each made their first appearance in the event, while the United States was the only nation to have runners in each of the first three Olympic marathons.

The marathon included the first two black people to compete in the Olympics: two Tswana men named Len Taunyane and Jan Mashiani, who happened to be in St. Louis as part of the South African exhibit at the 1904 World's Fair. Both had served as long-distance message runners during the then-recent Second Boer War. Although some accounts report that both ran barefoot, Mashiani was wearing shoes in photographs taken during the event.

== Competition format ==
The marathon distance had not yet been standardized; in St. Louis, the course was 24 miles and 1500 yards (40 km). The organizers started the marathon at 3:00 pm, whereas most modern marathons start in the early morning to take advantage of cooler times of day.

The start included five laps, or 1 2/3 miles (2.68 km), around the stadium track. The remainder of the course was on dusty country roads, with race officials riding in vehicles ahead of and behind the runners: this created dust clouds that exacerbated the severely hot and humid conditions, with a temperature of around 90 degrees Fahrenheit (32 degrees Celsius) at the starting time. The route had to be altered at the last minute after roads in the Creve Coeur area were washed out by rain.

Also, the course was not cleared of obstacles for the marathon; the runners had to dodge cross-town traffic, delivery wagons, railroad trains, trolley cars and even people walking their dogs.

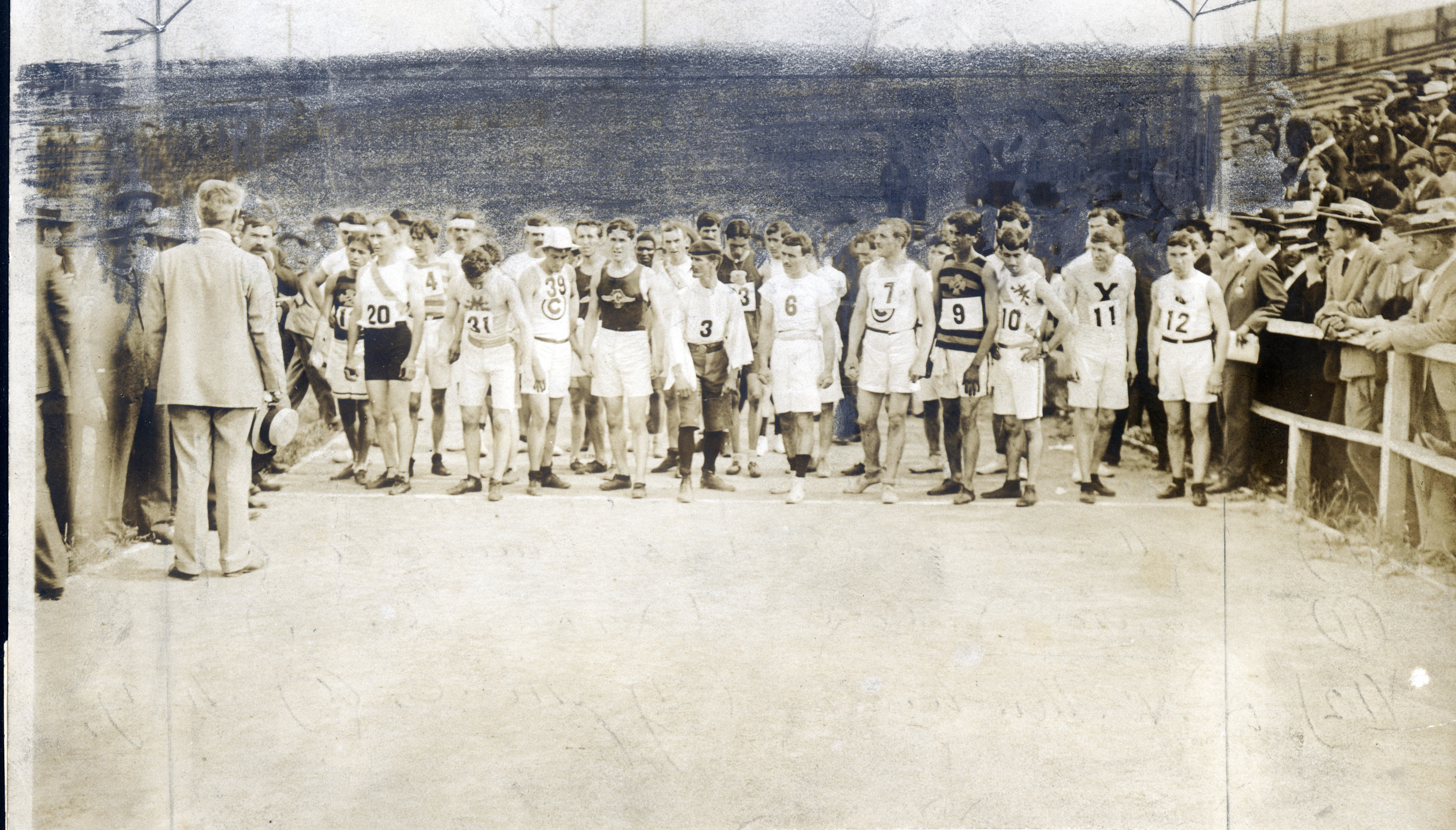
Runners gathered immediately before the race start

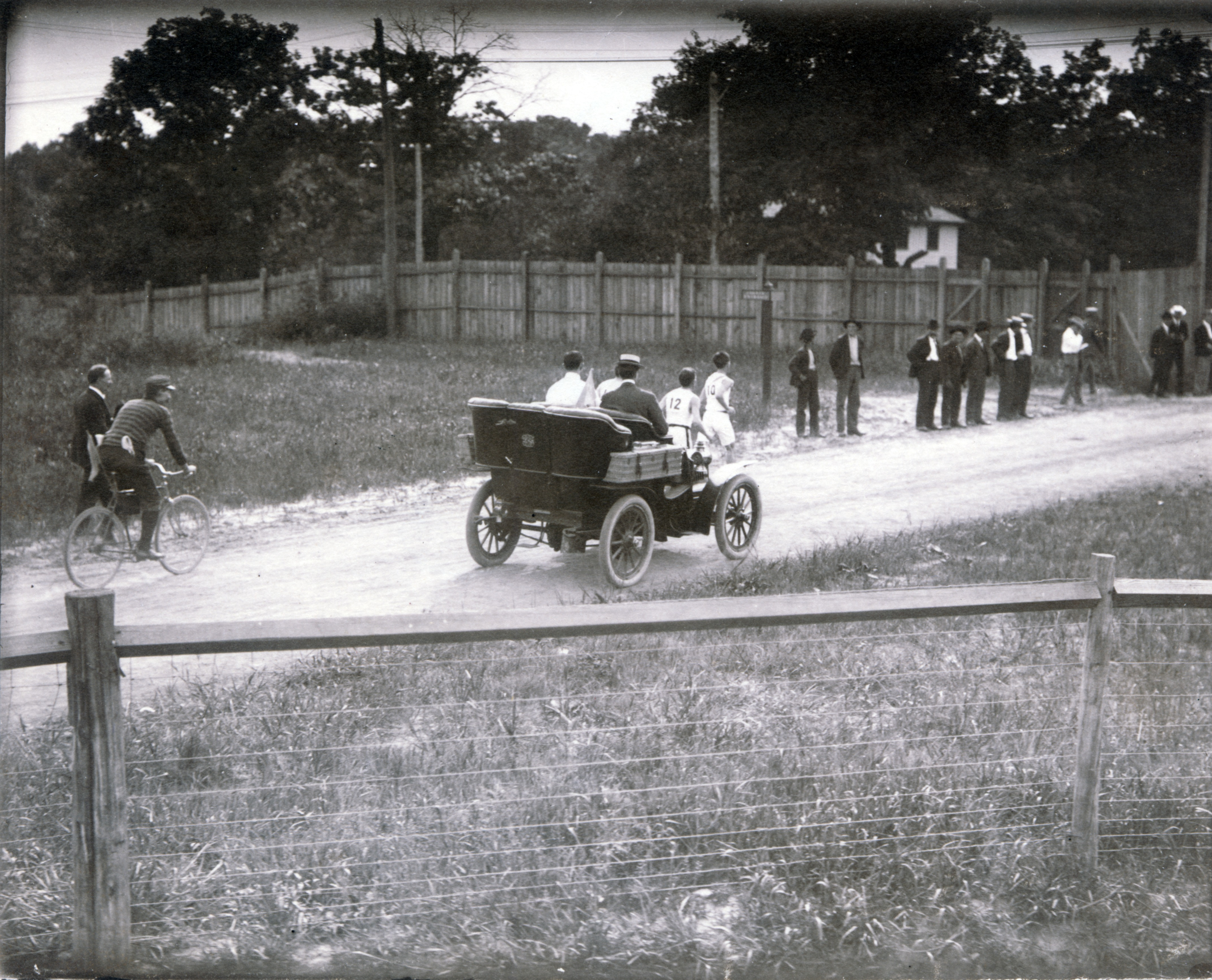
First runners leaving the stadium (Mellor and Newton in front of referees' automobile)

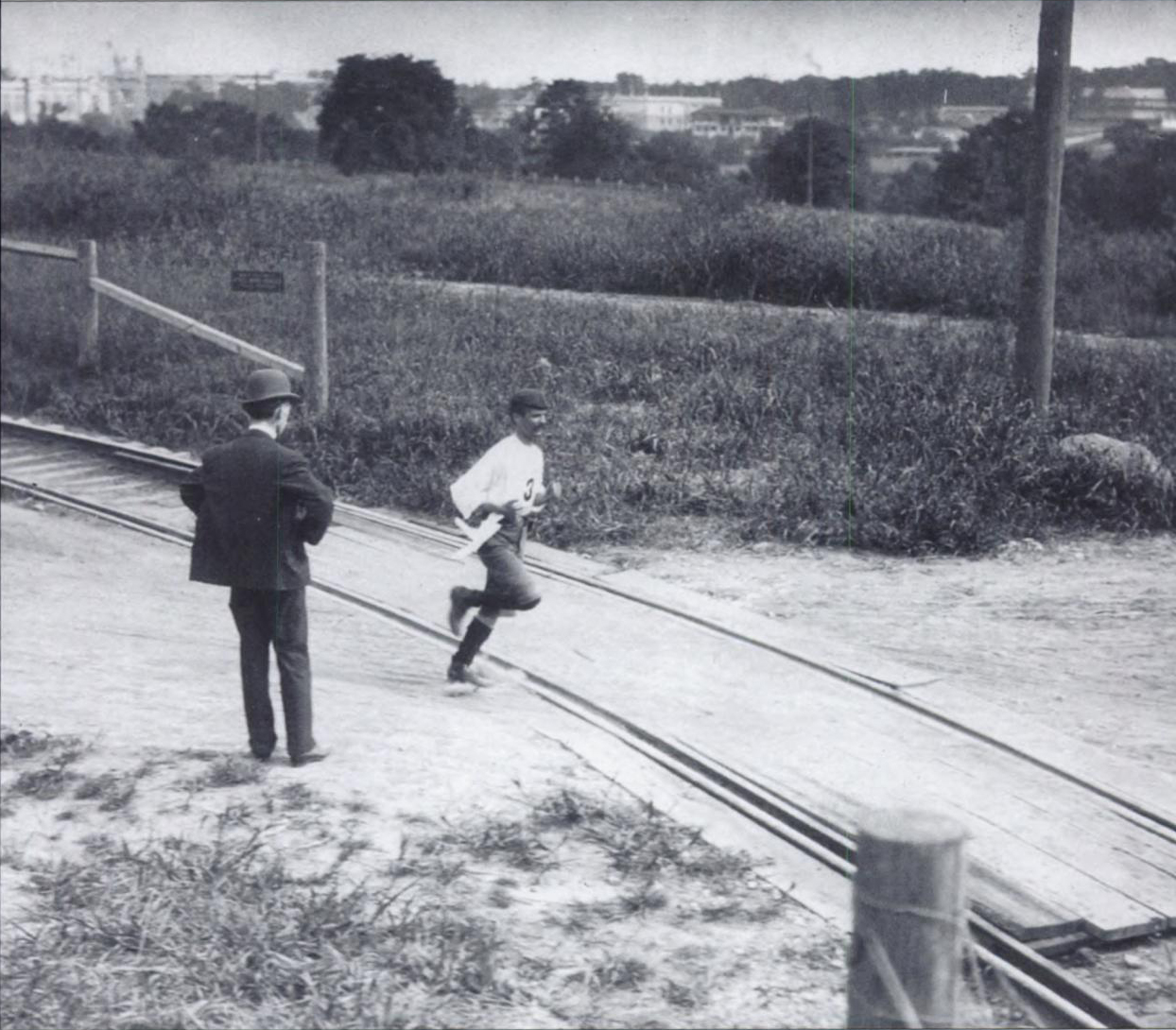
Andarín Carvajal on his way to fourth place

== Summary ==
Marathon route

During the race, John Lordan, who had won the 1903 Boston Marathon, was violently ill after 10 miles (16 km) and retired, while Sam Mellor, who had won the 1902 Boston Marathon, was also overcome by the dust; despite leading the field at the halfway mark, Mellor became disoriented and ultimately dropped out of the race after 14.5 miles (23.3 km). Another near-fatality during the event was William Garcia of the United States. He was found lying on the road along the marathon course unconscious, with severe internal injuries that had been caused by breathing the clouds of dust kicked up by the race officials' cars.

The first to arrive at the finish line, after three hours and 13 minutes – more than 13 minutes slower than the winning time in 1900 – was Frederick Lorz. After being hailed as the winner, he had his photograph taken with Alice Roosevelt, daughter of then-U.S. President Theodore Roosevelt: she placed a wreath upon Lorz's head, and was about to award him the gold medal when spectators claimed Lorz had not run the entire race. Lorz, suffering cramps, had actually dropped out of the race after nine miles and hitched a ride back to the stadium in a car, waving at spectators and runners alike during the ride. When the car broke down at the 19th mile, he re-entered the race and jogged across the finish line.

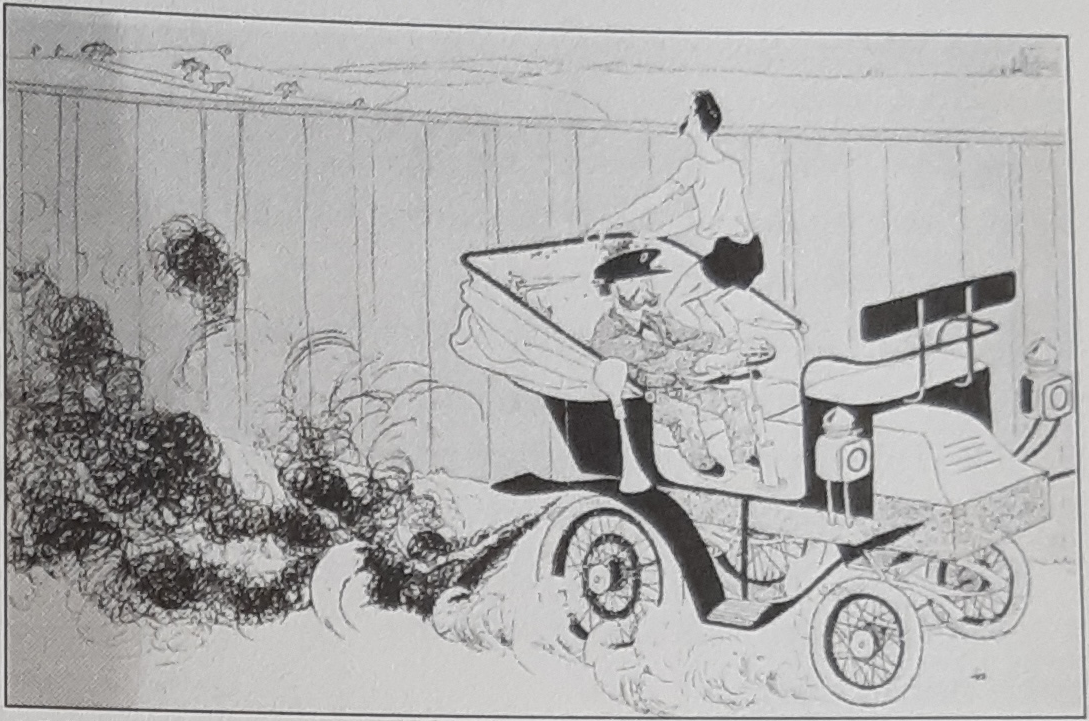
A 1904 editorial cartoon depicting Lorz riding a car during the marathon

Upon being confronted by furious race officials with these allegations, Lorz immediately admitted his deception. Despite his claim that he was playing a practical joke, the AAU responded by banning Lorz for life; this was commuted to six months on February 19, 1905, after Lorz formally apologized and it was found that he had not intended to defraud. Lorz later won the 1905 Boston Marathon.

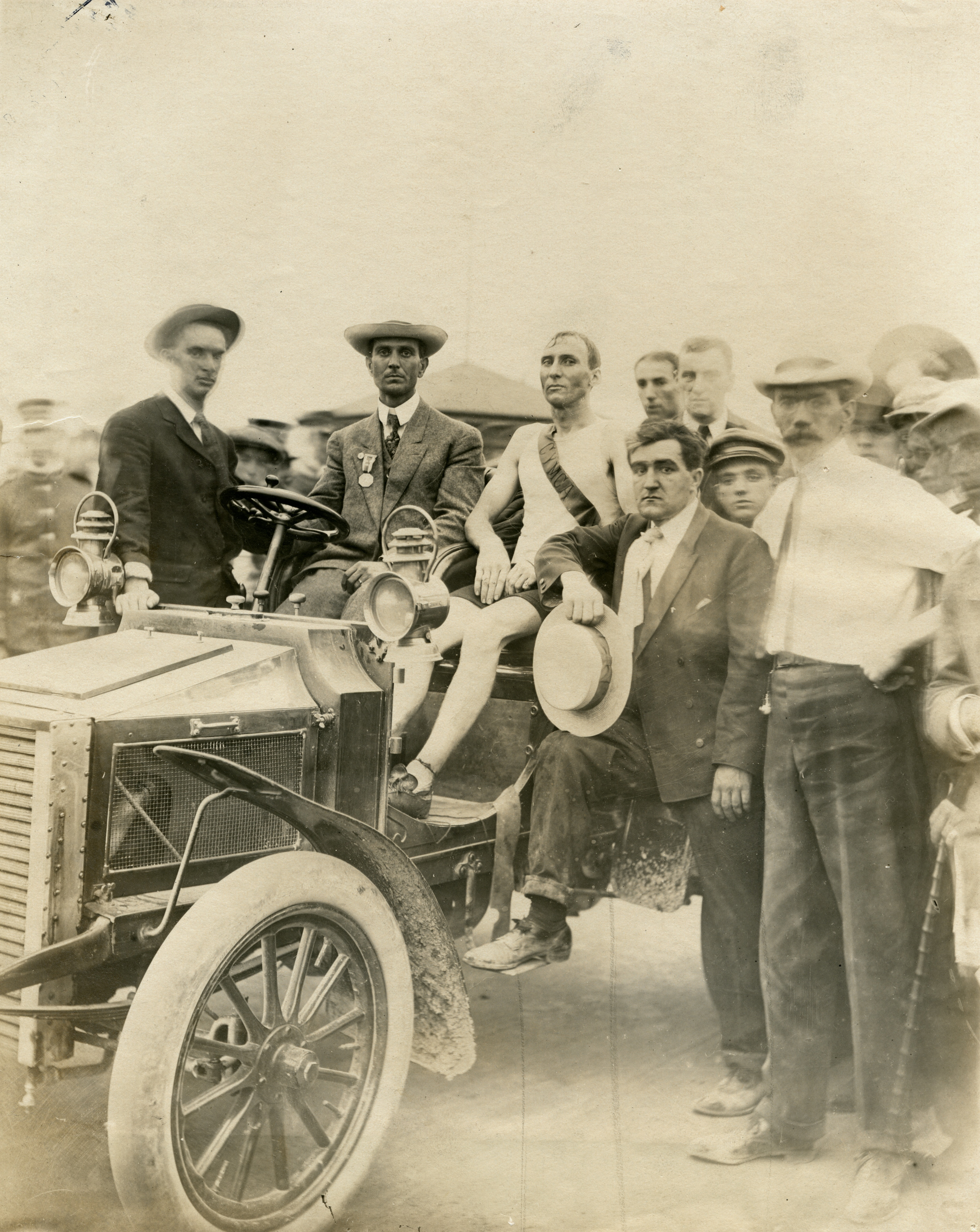
Hicks resting after his victory

Thomas Hicks ended up winning the event, although he benefited from various forms of aid that would not be allowed today. 10 miles (16 km) from the finish, Hicks led the race by 1.5 miles (2.4 km), but he had to be restrained from stopping and lying down by his trainers. From then until the end of the race, Hicks received several doses of strychnine – a common rat poison, which stimulates the nervous system in small doses – mixed with brandy and egg white. This was the earliest recorded use of performance-enhancing drugs in the revived Olympic Games. He continued to battle onwards, hallucinating, and was barely able to walk for most of the course. When he reached the stadium, his support team carried him over the line, holding him in the air while he shuffled his feet as if still running. Hicks had to be carried off the track on a stretcher, and might have died in the stadium had he not been treated by four doctors. He lost 8 pounds (3.6 kg) during the course of the marathon.

Cuban postman Andarín Carvajal had also joined the marathon, arriving at the last minute. After losing all of his money gambling in New Orleans, Louisiana, he hitchhiked to St. Louis and had to run the event in street clothes that he cut around the legs to make them into shorts. Not having eaten in 40 hours, he saw a spectator eating two peaches. He asked if he could have the peaches, and the spectator declined. He then stole both peaches and ran away. Later, he stopped off in an orchard en route to eat some apples, which turned out to be rotten. The rotten apples caused him to have strong stomach cramps, and he had to lie down and take a nap. Despite his discomfort and the pause, Carvajal still managed to finish in fourth place.

Arriving without correct documents, Albert Corey, a French immigrant to the United States, is inconsistently listed as participating in a mixed team in the four mile team race (with four undisputed Americans) and competing for the United States in the marathon. The South African entrants, Len Taunyane and Jan Mashiani, finished ninth and twelfth, respectively. Taunyane was chased roughly a mile off course by a dog, which affected his placement.

== Allegations of cheating by Hicks ==
Historian Clément Genty has argued, based on his own research, that the marathon's final classification should be revised. Citing the two official 1905 reports of the race — those of race director Charles J. P. Lucas and of James Edward Sullivan for the Spalding's Athletic Almanac — Genty contends that Hicks received a car escort and was physically carried by two officials over a substantial part of the final stretch, in addition to being administered strychnine mixed with egg white and brandy, despite race organizers having explicitly announced before the start that no assistance to runners would be permitted.

Genty draws a parallel with the disqualification of Lorz for comparable assistance, as well as with the 1908 Olympic marathon, where American officials filed a protest over the assistance that first-place finisher Dorando Pietri had received from British officials, resulting in runner-up John Hayes being declared the winner instead. Genty contrasts this with the 1904 case, in which American officials themselves had provided the assistance to Hicks without any protest being upheld, and argues that the gold medal should be retroactively awarded to Albert Corey.

In 2023, Genty petitioned the International Olympic Committee's Olympic Studies Centre for a formal review of the result; the Centre replied that it was not competent to revisit decisions made on the field of play or to revise the classification of a competition held nearly 120 years earlier. Genty has since raised the possibility of an appeal to the Court of Arbitration for Sport or a diplomatic approach through the French National Olympic and Sports Committee. As of 2026, the official classification of the event has not been revised.

== Dehydration ==
The only source of water for the competitors was a well at about the halfway (12 miles 750 yards (19.998 km)) mark. However Carvajal managed to get a drink from a water tower roughly 6 miles (9.7 km) in. James Edward Sullivan was a chief organizer of the Olympics, and set up no other water sources along the 24 miles and 1500 yards course of the marathon even though it was conducted in 32 °C (90 °F) heat over unpaved roads that were choked with dust. His ostensible reason was to conduct research on "purposeful dehydration": this, combined with poor officiating, saw the marathon end with the worst ratio of finishers to starters (14 out of 32), and the slowest winning time, 3:28:53, which was exactly 29 minutes slower than the second-slowest winning time.

== Schedule ==
Date	Time	Round
Tuesday, 30 August 1904	15:00	Final

== Results ==
Rank	Athlete	Nation	Time
1	Thomas Hicks	United States	3:28:53
2	Albert Corey	United States	3:34:52
3	Arthur Newton	United States	3:47:33
4	Andarín Carvajal	Cuba	Unknown
5	Dimitrios Veloulis	Greece	Unknown
6	David Kneeland	United States	Unknown
7	Harry Brawley	United States	Unknown
8	Sidney Hatch	United States	Unknown
9	Len Taunyane	South Africa	Unknown
10	Christos Zechouritis	Greece	Unknown
11	Harry Devlin	United States	Unknown
12	Jan Mashiani	South Africa	Unknown
13	John Furla	United States	Unknown
14	Andrew Oikonomou	Greece	Unknown
DSQ	Frederick Lorz	United States	3:13:00
—	Edward P. Carr	United States	DNF
—	Georgios Drosos	Greece	DNF
—	Robert Fowler	United States	DNF
—	John Foy	United States	DNF
—	William Garcia	United States	DNF
—	Kharilaos Giannakas	Greece	DNF
—	Bertie Harris	South Africa	DNF
—	Thomas J. Kennedy	United States	DNF
—	John Lordon	United States	DNF
—	Ioannis Loungitsas	Greece	DNF
—	Georgios Louridas	Greece	DNF
—	Samuel Mellor	United States	DNF
—	Frank Pierce	United States	DNF
—	Petros Pipiles	Greece	DNF
—	Guy Porter	United States	DNF
—	Michael Spring	United States	DNF
—	Georgios Vamkaitis	Greece	DNF
—	Louis Crancer	United States	DNS
—	John Daly	Great Britain	DNS
—	William Heritage	United States	DNS
—	John Kennedy	United States	DNS
—	Konstantinos Lontos	United States	DNS
—	William Meyer	United States	DNS
—	Billy Sherring	Canada	DNS
—	Dimitrios Tsokas	Greece	DNS

== Sources ==
- Wudarski, Pawel (1999). "Wyniki Igrzysk Olimpijskich" (in Polish).
- Charles J. P. Lucas, The Olympic Games, 1904. St. Louis, Mo: Woodward & Tieran Printing Co., 1905 (copy from LA84 Foundation library)
