= Thomas Hicks (athlete) =

American track and field athlete (1876–1952)

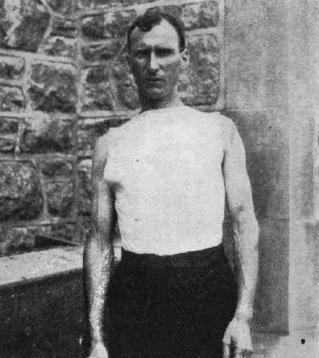
- Hicks at the 1904 Summer Olympics

Personal information
- Nationality: American
- Born: Thomas John Hicks; January 11, 1876 Birmingham, Great Britain
- Died: January 28, 1952 (aged 76) Winnipeg, Manitoba, Canada

Sport
- Sport: Long-distance running
- Event: Marathon
Medal record
Men's athletics
Representing the United States
Olympic Games
Gold medal – first place	1904 St. Louis	Marathon

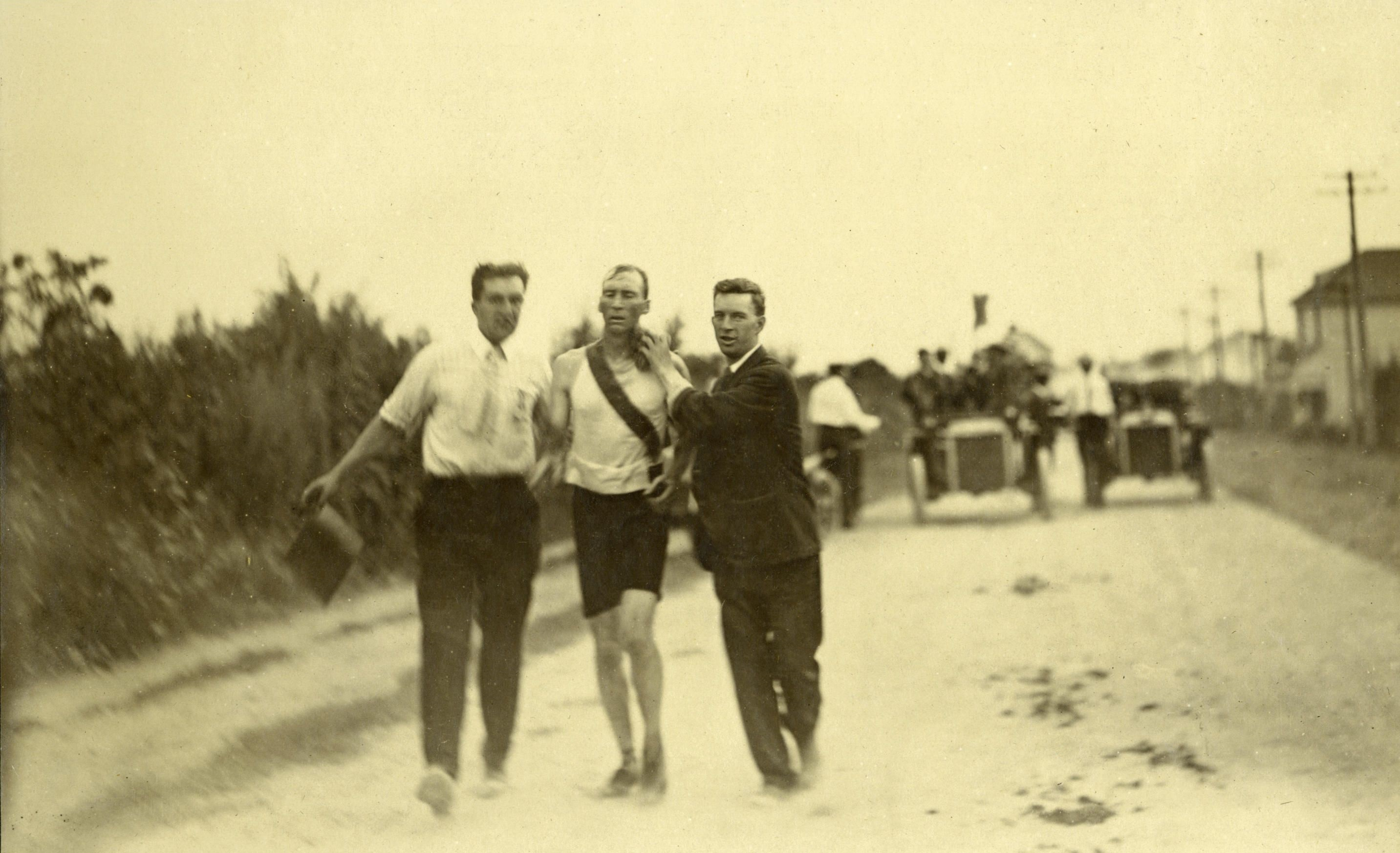
Hicks and supporters at the 1904 Summer Olympics

Thomas John Hicks (January 11, 1876 – January 28, 1952) was an American track and field athlete. He won the marathon at the 1904 Summer Olympics.

== Biography ==
Hicks, a brass worker from Cambridge, Massachusetts, was born in England. He was the winner of a marathon race at the 1904 Summer Olympics, held as part of the World's Fair in St. Louis, Missouri.

Conditions were bad, the course being a dirt track, with large clouds of dust produced by the accompanying vehicles. Hicks was not the first to cross the finish line, trailing Fred Lorz. However, Lorz had abandoned the race after 9 miles (14 km). After covering much of the course by car, he re-entered the race 5 miles (8.0 km) before the finish. This was discovered by the officials, who disqualified Lorz, who claimed it had been a joke.

Had the race been run under current rules, Hicks would also have been disqualified for using strychnine: his assistants had given him a dose of 1/60 grain (1.1 mg) of strychnine and some brandy because he was flagging badly during the race; the first dose did not revive him for long, so he was given another. As a result, he collapsed after crossing the finishing line. Another dose might have been fatal. Strychnine has been forbidden for athletes since the late 1960s when the International Olympic Committee started testing them for drugs, and the last known use of strychnine occurred at the 2016 Summer Olympics.

Hicks finished in sixth place at the Boston Marathon in 1900 and fifth place in 1901. In the fall of the latter year, he relocated to Minneapolis, Minnesota, for work, and while there became captain of the Minneapolis YMCA cross-country team that won the state championship. He returned to Boston in the spring of 1904 and finished second in the Boston Marathon that year. He dropped out during the following year's race; the year after, he began walking at Wellesley and walked all the way to the finish. The 1905 Boston Marathon was legitimately won by Lorz. However, on June 30, 1906, Hicks finished three minutes ahead of Alexander Thibeau to win a marathon at an Amateur Athletic Union meet in Chicago (3:02). The next year, he finished thirteenth at the Boston Marathon and sixth at the Chicago Marathon conducted by the Illinois Athletic Club. He finished sixteenth at the same race in the following year, by which time he had returned to Minneapolis. On January 16, 1909, he was leading a marathon at Chicago under terrible weather conditions for more than 8 miles (13 km) before retiring with a stitch; the race was won by Sidney Hatch.

In later years, he worked on mining claims at Ingolf, Ontario, and lived at Winnipeg, Manitoba, Canada, where his two brothers had settled. He became a naturalized Canadian and died at Winnipeg in 1952 at the age of seventy-six.
