= Frederick Lorz =

American distance runner (1884–1914)

Fred Lorz
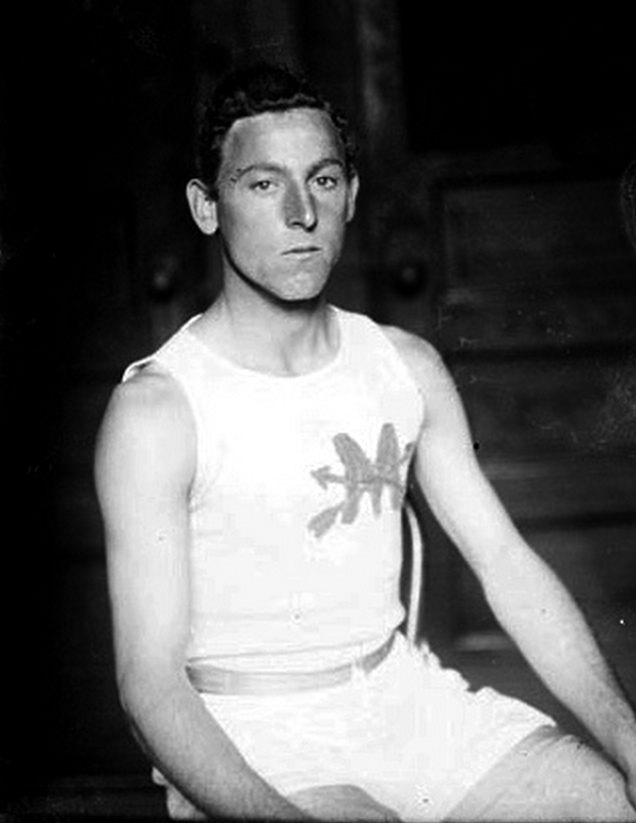
- Lorz in 1904

Personal information
- Full name: Frederick G. Lorz
- Born: June 5, 1884 New York, New York, U.S.
- Died: February 4, 1914 (aged 29) Bronx, New York, U.S.

Sport
- Country: United States
- Event: Marathon

Frederick Lorz (June 5, 1884 – February 4, 1914) was an American long-distance runner who won the 1905 Boston Marathon. Lorz is also known for his "finish" in the marathon at the 1904 Summer Olympics, where he did not cross the halfway mark of the race, and crossed the line to be hailed as the winner.

== Biography ==
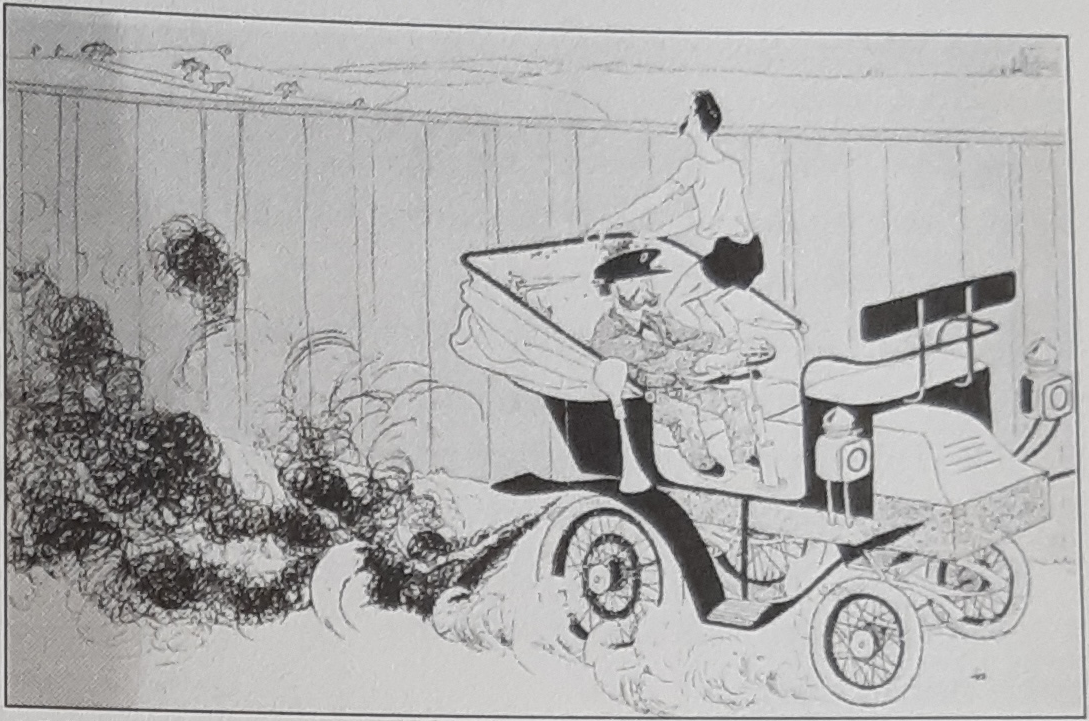
A 1904 editorial cartoon depicting Lorz riding a car during the 1904 Olympic marathon

Born in New York City, Lorz was reported to have done all his training at night due to his profession as a bricklayer.

An announcement in the August 6, 1904, issue of The New York Times indicated that the Metropolitan Association of the Amateur Athletic Union would hold a "special seven-mile race" at Celtic Park on August 13, 1904, with the eight top finishers receiving a paid trip to compete in the marathon at the Olympic Games in St. Louis on August 30, 1904. Lorz, listed as representing the Mohawk Athletic Club, was named as one of 19 "probable competitors" in the event.

In the marathon at the 1904 Olympic Games, Lorz stopped running because of exhaustion after nine miles (14 km). His manager gave him a lift in his car and drove the next eleven miles (18 km) before the car broke down, after which Lorz continued on foot back to the Olympic stadium, where he broke the finishing line tape and was greeted as the winner.

After spectators claimed he had not run the entire race, Lorz was confronted by furious officials with these allegations, upon which he admitted his deception: despite his claims he was playing a practical joke, the AAU responded by banning him for life, but this was commuted to six months on February 19, 1905, after Lorz formally apologized and it was found that he had not intended to defraud. Lorz then legitimately won the Boston Marathon in 1905 with a time of 2:38:25. Thomas Hicks was the actual winner of the 1904 Olympic marathon, though he too had an unusual race, walking part of the route, being carried by his trainers, and being dosed with strychnine, which has since been banned; among the 32 runners that started, he was one of several who came near death, along with William Garcia.

Lorz was suspended a second time by the Amateur Athletic Union for participating in an unsanctioned meet at the games of the Thomas Jefferson Club at Witzel's Grove, College Point, Long Island, New York on August 23, 1905. It prevented him from competing, for instance, in the inaugural 1905 Chicago Marathon. The suspension was going to be in place for two years. However, it was lifted about September 1906, which let Lorz finish fourth in the 2nd running of the Chicago Marathon on October 1.

Lorz traveled to London for the 1908 Summer Olympics but ultimately did not participate. Frederick Lorz died in 1914 of pneumonia.

== See also ==
- Marathon course-cutting
- List of winners of the Boston Marathon
