= 1904 Summer Olympics =

Multi-sport event in St. Louis, Missouri, US

Games of the III Olympiad
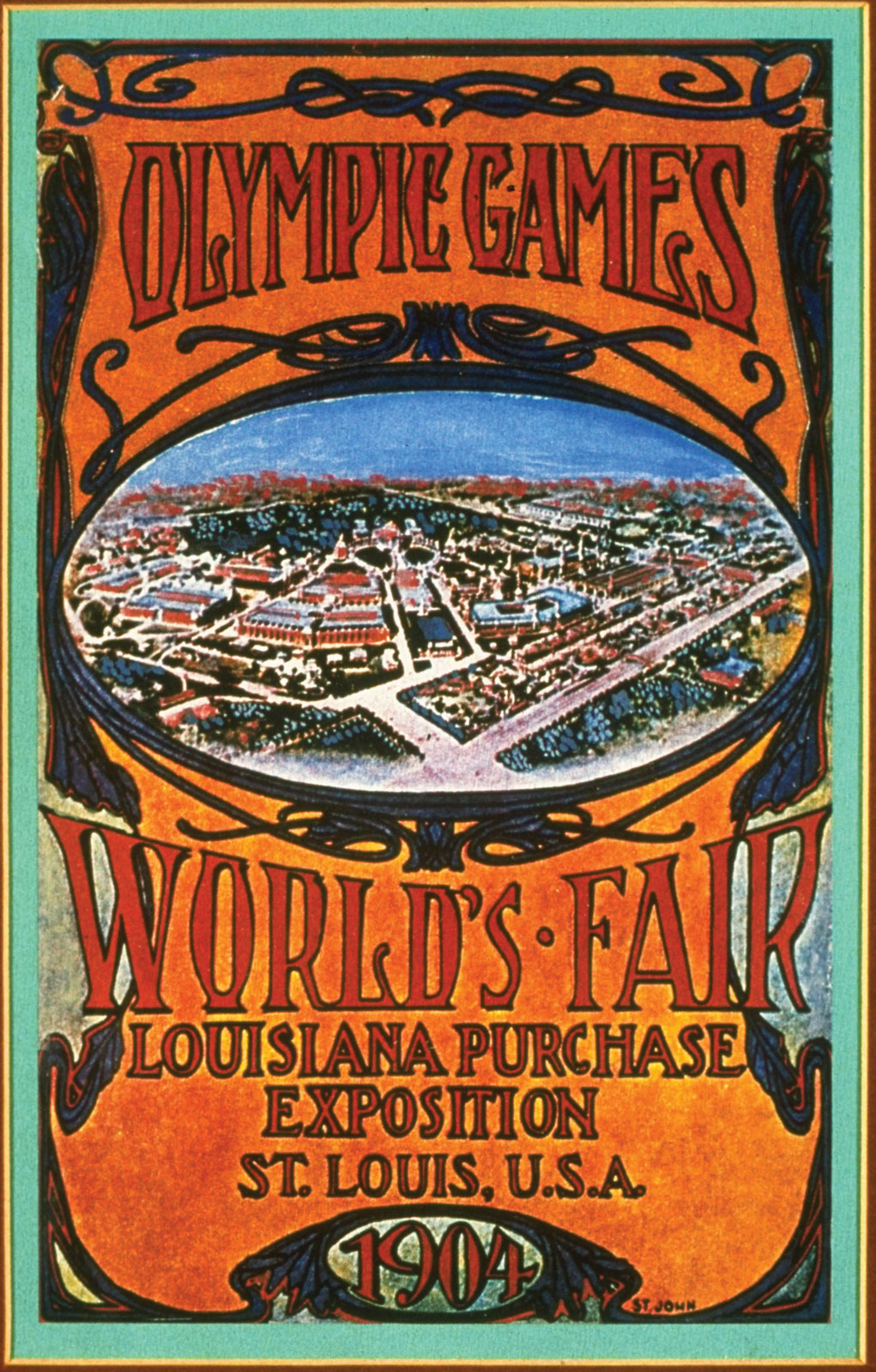
- Advertisement for the 1904 Summer Olympics and the Louisiana Purchase Exposition
- Location: St. Louis, United States
- Nations: 13
- Athletes: 648 (642 men, 6 women)
- Events: 95 in 16 sports (18 disciplines)
- Opening: July 1, 1904
- Closing: November 23, 1904
- Opened by: David R. Francis
- Stadium: Washington University in St. Louis Francis Olympic Field

The 1904 Summer Olympics (officially the Games of the III Olympiad and also known as St. Louis 1904) were an international multi-sport event held in St. Louis, Missouri, United States, from July 1 to November 23, 1904. Many events were conducted at what is now known as Francis Field on the campus of Washington University in St. Louis. This was the first time that the Olympic Games were held outside Europe.

Tensions caused by the Russo–Japanese War and difficulties in traveling to St. Louis resulted in very few top-class athletes from outside the United States and Canada taking part in the 1904 Games. Only twelve nations were represented. Some events subsequently combined the U.S. national championship with the Olympic championship. The current three-medal format of gold, silver and bronze for first, second and third place was introduced at the 1904 Olympics.

== Background ==
After the first two editions of the Olympic Games were awarded to Athens and Paris, the IOC's first open bidding process was held for the 1904 Olympics at the 4th IOC Session in Paris in May 1901. Chicago civic leaders, including University of Chicago president William Rainey Harper, formed the International Olympian Games Association in February 1901 to plan for hosting the Olympics. Shortly before the session began, another American bid was submitted from St. Louis, which was then preparing to host the Louisiana Purchase Exposition, a World's Fair in 1903. At the session, representatives of Chicago offered to put $100,000 (equivalent to $3,870,000 in 2025) toward the games. Unable to compete with this, all other countries withdrew their bids before the IOC voted; cities which had previously expressed interest in the 1904 games included Berlin, Copenhagen, and Stockholm. The IOC delegates then voted between the choices of Chicago and St. Louis, with Chicago winning unanimously on May 21.

However, after St. Louis was forced to postpone its World's Fair from 1903 to 1904, it began planning athletic events that would compete directly with the Olympics in Chicago. The Amateur Athletic Union favored St. Louis and planned to hold its national championships at the World's Fair. In the meantime, Chicago's plans for a new stadium on the shore of Lake Michigan seating 75,000 met considerable opposition from local leaders, including Aaron Montgomery Ward, putting the centerpiece of Chicago's Olympic bid into question. On December 23, 1902, fearing that the dispute would permanently damage the Olympic movement, the IOC asked its members to approve, by a postal vote, the transfer of the Olympic Games to St. Louis. When the votes were tallied, IOC founder Pierre de Coubertin telegraphed the Chicago committee on February 10, 1903, to inform them that the Games had been moved.

== The Games ==
=== Highlights ===
Boxing, dumbbells, catch wrestling (which later became freestyle wrestling), and the decathlon made their debuts. The swimming events were held in a temporary pond near Skinker and Wydown Boulevards, where "lifesaving demonstrations" of unsinkable lifeboats for ocean liners took place.

One of the most remarkable athletes was the American gymnast George Eyser, who won six medals even though his left leg was made of wood, and Frank Kugler won four medals in freestyle wrestling, weightlifting and tug of war, making him the only competitor to win a medal in three different sports at the same Olympic Games.

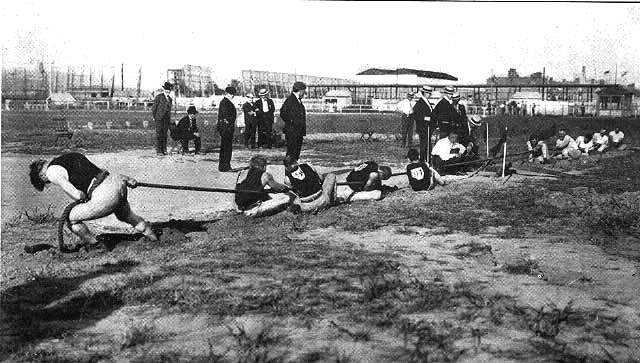
A tug of war competition at the 1904 Summer Olympics

Chicago runner James Lightbody won the steeplechase and the 800 m and then set a natural world record in the 1500 m. Harry Hillman won both the 200 m and 400 m hurdles and also the flat 400 m. Sprinter Archie Hahn was champion in the 60 m, 100 m and 200 m. In this last race, he set an Olympic record in 21.6, a natural record that stood for 28 years. In the discus, after American Martin Sheridan had thrown exactly the same distance as his compatriot, Ralph Rose (39.28 m), the judges gave them both an extra throw to decide the winner. Sheridan won the decider and claimed the gold medal. Ray Ewry again won all three standing jumps. Meanwhile, Frederick Lorz, initially hailed as the victor in the marathon, was discoverd to have ridden in a car to complete a portion of the race. Thomas Hicks was instead declared the winner of the marathon, despite nearly dying from an overdose of strychnine.

The team representing Great Britain was awarded a total of two medals, both won by Irish athletes. The top non-U.S. athlete was Emil Rausch of Germany, who won three swimming events. Zoltán Halmay of Hungary and Charles Daniels of the United States each won two swimming gold medals. Galt Football Club from Canada won the gold medal in football.

=== Anthropology Days ===
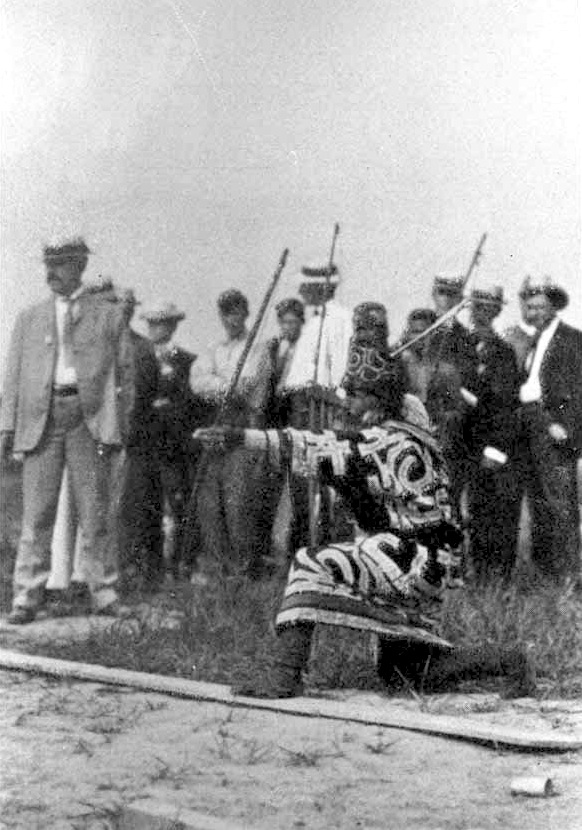
An Ainu man competing in an archery contest during "Anthropology Days"

The organizers of the World's Fair held "Anthropology Days" on August 12 and 13. Since the 1889 Paris Exposition, human zoos, as a key feature of world's fairs, functioned as demonstrations of anthropological notions of race, progress, and civilization. These goals were followed also at the 1904 World's Fair. Fourteen hundred indigenous people from Southeast Asia, the Pacific Islands, East Asia, Africa, the Middle East, South America and North America were displayed in anthropological exhibits that showed them in their natural habitats. Another 1600 indigenous people displayed their culture in other areas of the Louisiana Purchase Exposition (LPE), including on the fairgrounds and at the Model School, where American Indian boarding schools students demonstrated their successful assimilation.

The sporting event itself took place with the participation of about 100 paid indigenous men. Contests included "baseball throwing, shot put, running, broad jumping, weight lifting, pole climbing, and tugs-of-war before a crowd of approximately ten thousand". No women participated in Anthropology Days, though some, notably the Fort Shaw Indian School girls basketball team, did compete in other athletic events at the LPE.

According to theorist Susan Brownell, world's fairs – with their inclusion of human zoos – and the Olympics were a logical fit at this time, as they "were both linked to an underlying cultural logic that gave them a natural affinity". Also, one of the original intentions of Anthropology Days was to create publicity for the official Olympic events.

== Sports ==
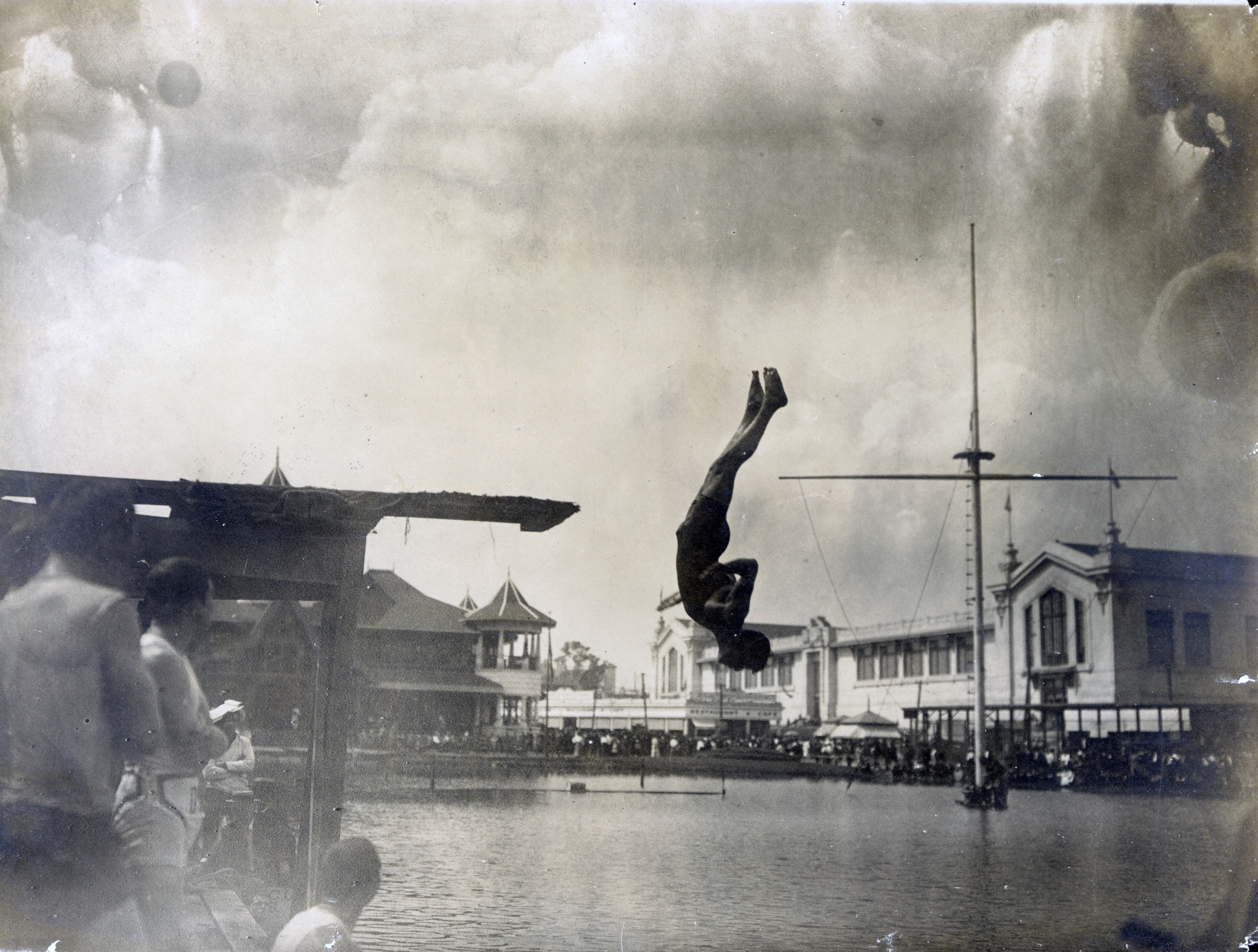
Frank Kehoe (aka Keogh) of the Chicago Athletic Association during the fancy diving competition at the 1904 Olympics. Photograph by Jessie Tarbox Beals. Missouri Historical Society.

The 1904 Summer Olympic program featured 16 sports encompassing 95 events in 18 disciplines. Swimming, diving and water polo are considered three disciplines of the same sport, aquatics. In July 2021 the IOC accepted the recommendation of Olympic historian Bill Mallon regarding which sports and events should be considered as Olympic. The number of events in each discipline is noted in parentheses.

- Aquatics
  - Diving (2)
  - Swimming (9)
  - Water polo (1)
- Archery (6)
- Athletics (25)
- Boxing (7)
- Cycling (7)
- Fencing (5)
- Football (1)
- Golf (2)
- Gymnastics (11)
- Lacrosse (1)
- Roque (1)
- Rowing (5)
- Tennis (2)
- Tug of war (1)
- Weightlifting (2)
- Wrestling (7)

=== New sports ===
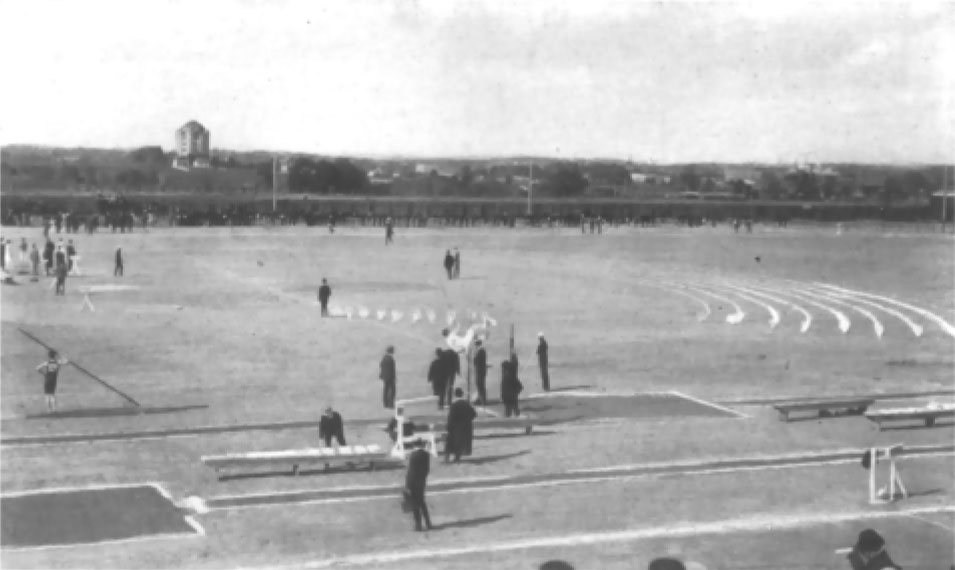
Francis Olympic Field, Washington University in St. Louis, 1904

Boxing made its Olympic debut at the St. Louis Games. The sport has since featured at every Summer Olympics, except for the 1912 Stockholm Games.

While wrestling made a return, it was exclusively the newly debuted catch wrestling (which later became freestyle wrestling) as opposed to Greco-Roman style of the 1896 Summer Olympics. Five nations were represented, with each of the 42 competitors having resided in the United States. Later editions would have both styles of wrestling in their programs.

=== Demonstration sports ===
Basketball, hurling, American football and Gaelic football were featured as unofficial sports. There was a demonstration bout of women's boxing. Baseball is also noted by the World Baseball Softball Confederation to have appeared at the Games, though it does not appear in the list compiled by Olympic historian Bill Mallon and any results are not known.

== Venues ==
Map of St. Louis with Olympic venues marked. Creve Coeur Lake is located further west.

Five sports venues were used for the 1904 Summer Olympics. The venues included Glen Echo Country Club, the first golf course constructed west of the Mississippi River, which had opened in 1901. Three Olympic sports were hosted at Forest Park, the site of the Louisiana Purchase Exposition which was being held concurrently with the Olympics: the Life Saving Exhibition Lake at Forest Park was used for the diving, swimming, and water polo events.

Creve Coeur Lake became the first park of St. Louis County in 1945. The Lake has hosted rowing regattas since 1882 and still hosts them as of 2010. Francis Olympic Field and Gymnasium are still in use on the Washington University in St. Louis campus as of 2021. An ornamental gate commemorating the 1904 Games was constructed outside the stadium immediately after the Exposition. A swimming pool was added to the gymnasium in 1985. Forest Park, constructed in 1876, is still in use as of 2021 and attracts over 12 million visitors annually. Glen Echo Country Club remains in use as a golf course today as of 2021.

Venue	Sports	Capacity	Ref.
Creve Coeur Lake	Rowing	Not listed	
Francis Olympic Field	Archery, Athletics, Cycling, Football, Gymnastics, Lacrosse, Roque, Tennis, Tug of war, Weightlifting, Wrestling	19,000	
Francis Gymnasium	Boxing, Fencing	Not listed	
Forest Park	Diving, Swimming, Water polo	Not listed	
Glen Echo Country Club	Golf	Not listed	

== Participating nations ==
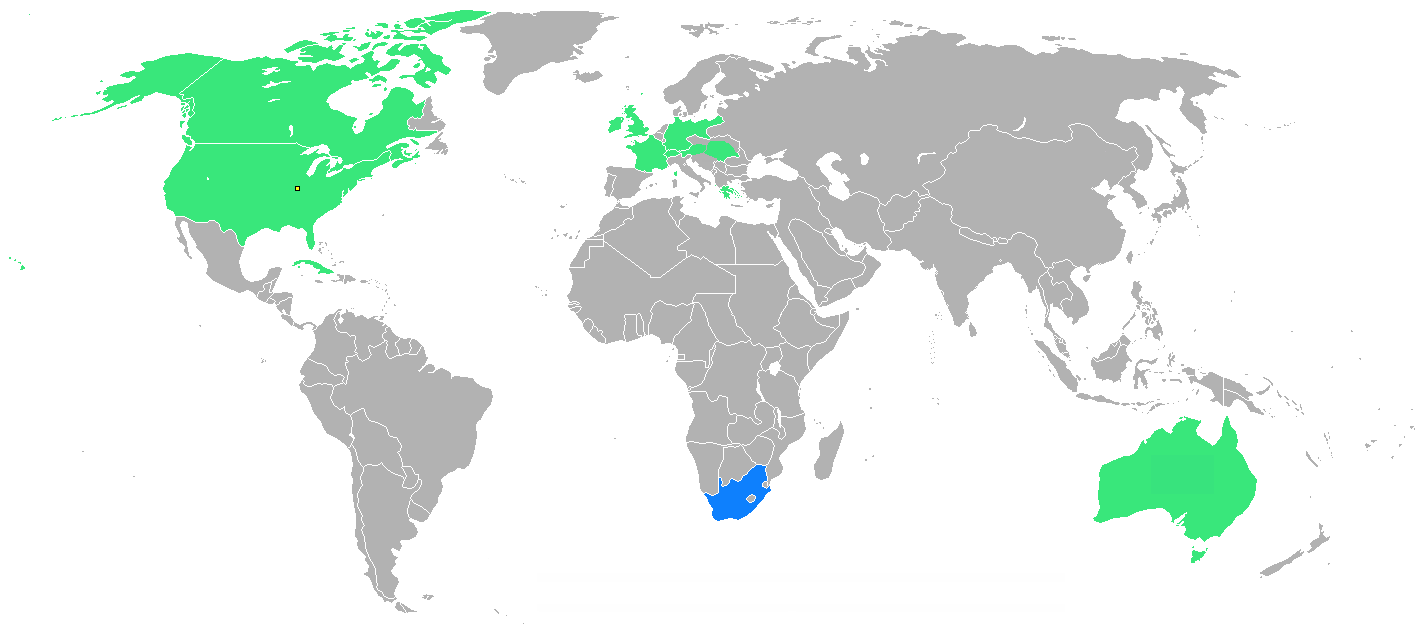
Participants. Blue = Participated for the first time Green = Previously participated Host city (St Louis) marked by yellow square

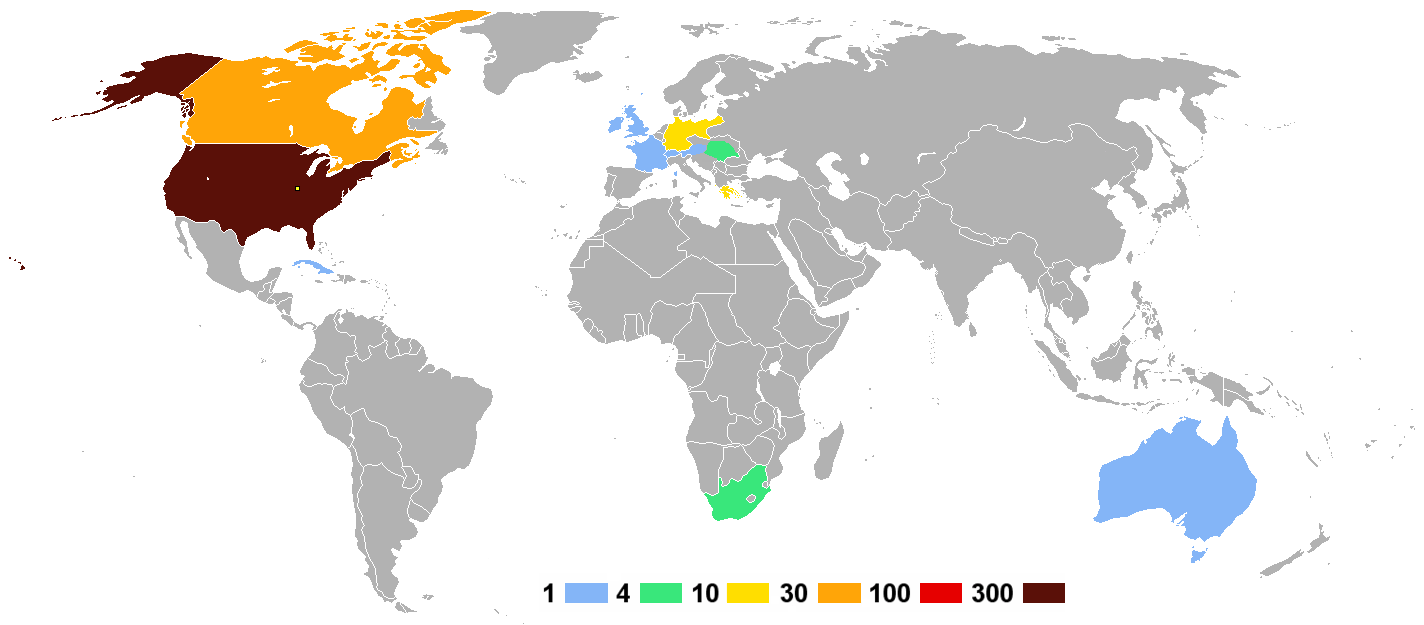
Number of athletes from each country

Athletes from twelve nations competed in St. Louis. Numbers in parentheses indicate the number of known competitors for each nation.

Participating National Olympic Committees
- Australia (3)
- Canada (56)
- Cuba (3)
- Germany (22)
- Great Britain (3)
- Greece (14)
- Hungary (4)
- Italy (1)
- South Africa (8)
- United States (526) (host)
- Mixed team (3)

Otherwise unrepresented countries whose athletes competed for other countries:

- Austria (2)
- France (1)
- Norway (2)
- Switzerland (2)

=== Disputed ===
Some sources also list athletes from the following nations as having competed at these Games:

- Newfoundland Colony (1)

==== Number of athletes by National Olympic Committees ====
Country	Athletes
United States	528
Canada	56
Germany	22
Greece	14
South Africa	8
Hungary	4
Great Britain	3
Australia	3
Cuba	3
Austria	2
Norway	2
Switzerland	2
France	1
Total	648

== Medal count ==
These are the nations that won medals at the 1904 Games.

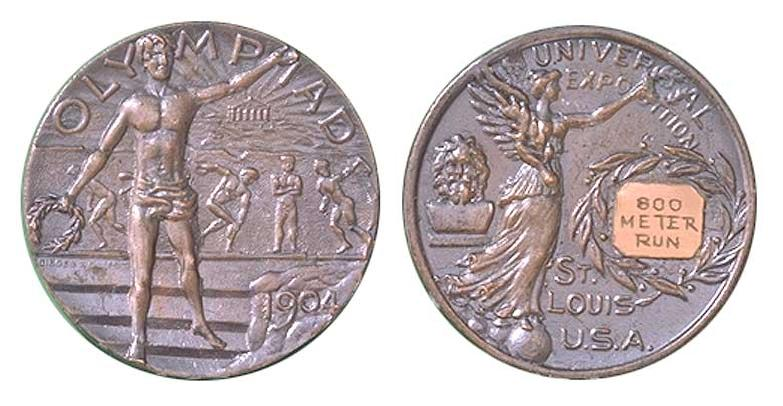
The silver medal of the 1904 Olympics for the 800 meter run

* Host nation (United States)

1904 Summer Olympics medal table (Note: Figures in table reflect all official changes in medal standings.)
Rank	Nation	Gold	Silver	Bronze	Total
1	United States*	80	85	83	248
2	Germany	5	4	5	14
3	Canada	4	1	1	6
4	Cuba	3	0	0	3
5	Hungary	2	1	1	4
6	Great Britain	1	1	0	2
7	Greece	1	0	1	2
8	Mixed team	1	0	0	1
Totals (8 entries)		97	92	91	280

=== Notes on medalists ===
Since 2024, the IOC has considered the National Olympic Committee (NOC) affiliation of the club or team for which an athlete competed to be the decisive factor for the first three Olympic Games (1896–1904), attributing participation and medals accordingly.

==== Germany ====
- SUI – Swiss gymnast Adolf Spinnler won a gold and a bronze medal, as he competed for the German club Turnverein Esslingen. Although Spinnler was Swiss, the IOC attributes his team medals to Germany, reflecting the club affiliation under which he competed.

==== United States ====
The nationalities of several medalists were disputed, as many athletes competing for American clubs or teams were recent immigrants who had not yet acquired U.S. citizenship. Following recommendations by Olympic historian Bill Mallon, the IOC adjusted its database in July 2021, attributing results by athletes nationality, and, from 2024 onward, attributed participation and medals according to the National Olympic Committee (NOC) affiliation of the club or team for which the athletes competed. As of the IOC's 2024 revision, the following cases comprise a total of 17 medals (4 gold, 7 silver, and 6 bronze) attributed to the United States despite having been won by non-American athletes, as they represented clubs affiliated with the United States. Three of the 17 medals (1 gold, 1 silver, and 1 bronze) were won by mixed teams consisting of American clubs or teams that included non-American athletes:

- ITA – In 2009, historians from the International Society of Olympic Historians discovered that cyclist Frank Bizzoni, believed to be an American, was still an Italian citizen when he competed in 1904: he received U.S. citizenship in 1917.
- NOR – Two Norwegian-American wrestlers, Charles Ericksen and Bernhoff Hansen won gold medals. In 2012, Norwegian historians found documentation showing that Ericksen did not receive American citizenship until March 22, 1905, while Hansen probably never received American citizenship. The historians therefore petitioned the IOC to have the athletes registered as Norwegians. In May 2013, it was reported that the Norwegian Olympic Committee had filed a formal application for changing the nationality of the wrestlers in the IOC's medal database, which was done.
- AUS – Swimmer and multi-medalist Francis Gailey was an Australian who traveled to America in 1902 and competed in 1904 for the Olympic Club of San Francisco. He returned to America in 1906, sailing to San Francisco on the SS Sonoma, became a naturalized citizen, and worked as an insurance clerk in California. He lived for a time in Ontario, Canada, where he married Mary Adams in 1914 or 1915, finally settling in southern California in 1918 and working as a foreman in the oil industry and managing orange-grove plantations.
- GER – Multi-medalist Frank Kugler of Germany, a member of the St. Louis Southwest Turnverein team, won three individual medals (one silver in wrestling and two bronze medals in weightlifting) and was also part of the American St. Louis Southwest Turnverein tug of war team that won a bronze medal. He was granted U.S. citizenship in 1913.
- SUI – Swiss-American wrestler Gustav Tiefenthaler was born in Switzerland, but the family moved to the United States when he was a child. He represented the South Broadway AC in St. Louis. At the Olympics, Tiefenthaler wrestled one bout and lost, but earned a bronze medal.
- FRA – French-American Albert Corey won silver medals in the marathon, and in the team race as part of a mixed team (together with four undisputed Americans).
- AUT – An Austrian expat to the United States, gymnast Julius Lenhart won gold and silver medals in individual events and gold medal in team competition as a part of a mixed team.
- AUT – Swimmer Otto Wahle, an Austrian who had won two silver medals for Austria at the 1900 Olympics, competed in 1904 for the New York Athletic Club. As a result, the IOC attributes his 1904 bronze medal to the United States, reflecting the club affiliation under which he competed.

In addition, the IOC had counted one gold, one silver, and two bronze medals won by the American fencer Albertson Van Zo Post for Cuba instead of the United States. The IOC also had shown Charles Tatham as a Cuban medal-winner for individual fencing events (foil and épée) and American silver medalist in the team foil event, but he was an American. All are now credited to the United States.

== See also ==
- Olympic Games held in the United States
  - 1904 Summer Olympics – St. Louis
  - 1932 Summer Olympics – Los Angeles
  - 1932 Winter Olympics – Lake Placid
  - 1960 Winter Olympics – Squaw Valley
  - 1980 Winter Olympics – Lake Placid
  - 1984 Summer Olympics – Los Angeles
  - 1996 Summer Olympics – Atlanta
  - 2002 Winter Olympics – Salt Lake City
  - 2028 Summer Olympics – Los Angeles
  - 2034 Winter Olympics – Salt Lake City
- List of IOC country codes

== Notes ==
Summer Olympics
Preceded by Paris	III Olympiad; St. Louis; 1904	Succeeded by London
