= List of Olympic medalists in golf =

This is the complete list of Olympic medalists in golf.

== Current program ==
=== Men's individual ===
Games	Gold	Silver	Bronze
1900 Paris	Charles Sands; United States	Walter Rutherford; Great Britain	David Robertson; Great Britain
1904 St. Louis	George Lyon; Canada	Chandler Egan; United States	Burt McKinnie; United States; Francis Newton; United States
1906–2012	not included in the Olympic program		
2016 Rio de Janeiro	Justin Rose; Great Britain	Henrik Stenson; Sweden	Matt Kuchar; United States
2020 Tokyo	Xander Schauffele; United States	Rory Sabbatini; Slovakia	Pan Cheng-tsung; Chinese Taipei
2024 Paris	Scottie Scheffler; United States	Tommy Fleetwood; Great Britain	Hideki Matsuyama; Japan
2028 Los Angeles			

=== Women's individual ===
Games	Gold	Silver	Bronze
1900 Paris	Margaret Abbott; United States	Pauline Whittier (USA); Switzerland (Note: In 2024, the IOC reinstated its original and current attribution policy for athletes at the early Olympic Games (1896–1904). From 2021 to 2024, the IOC briefly attributed medals in individual events according to the athlete's nationality, even when the athlete represented a foreign club or team. Since 2024, participation and medals have instead been attributed according to the national affiliation of the club or team represented by the athlete.)	Abbie Pratt (USA); France
1904–2012	not included in the Olympic program		
2016 Rio de Janeiro	Inbee Park; South Korea	Lydia Ko; New Zealand	Shanshan Feng; China
2020 Tokyo	Nelly Korda; United States	Mone Inami; Japan	Lydia Ko; New Zealand
2024 Paris	Lydia Ko; New Zealand	Esther Henseleit; Germany	Lin Xiyu; China
2028 Los Angeles			

=== Mixed teams ===
Games	Gold	Silver	Bronze
2028 Los Angeles			

== Discontinued event ==
=== Men's team ===
Games	Gold	Silver	Bronze
1904 St. Louis	United States; Robert Hunter; Chandler Egan; Kenneth Edwards; Clement Smoot; Walter Egan; Daniel Sawyer; Edward Cummins; Mason Phelps; Nathaniel Moore; Warren Wood	United States; Albert Lambert; Stuart Stickney; Burt McKinnie; William Stickney; Ralph McKittrick; Frederick Semple; Francis Newton; Henry Potter; John Cady; John Maxwell	United States; Douglass Cadwallader; Allan Lard; Jesse Carleton; Simeon Price; Harold Weber; John Rahm; Arthur Hussey; Orus Jones; Harold Fraser; George Oliver
