= List of male golfers =

A golfer is a person who plays golf. Below is a list of male golfers, professional and amateurs, sorted alphabetically. Category:Lists of golfers contains lists of golfers sorted in several other ways: by nationality, by tour and by type of major championship won (men's, women's or senior).

All members of the World Golf Hall of Fame are listed, including those inducted for their off-course contributions to the sport. They are annotated HoF.

== A ==
(United States) Tommy Aaron	1937–
(United States) Pat Abbott	1912–1984
(Sweden) Ludvig Åberg	1999–
(South Africa) Warren Abery	1973–
(Spain) Francisco Abreu	1943–
(United States) Brad Adamonis	1973–
(United States) Blake Adams	1975–
(Scotland) Jimmy Adams	1910–1986
(United States) Sam Adams	1946–
(Wales) Paul Affleck	1966–
(United States) Joe Affrunti	1981–
(Chile) Felipe Aguilar	1974–
(United States) Jim Ahern	1949–
(South Africa) Jaco Ahlers	1982–
(Finland) Antti Ahokas	1985–
(South Africa) Thomas Aiken	1983–
(Japan) Yurio Akitomi	1950–
(United States) Jim Albus	1940–
(United States) Tyler Aldridge	1984–
(United States) Buddy Alexander	1953–
(United States) Skip Alexander	1918–1987
(New Zealand) Steven Alker	1971–
(Scotland) Jack Allan	1875–1898
(Australia) Stephen Allan	1973–
(South Africa) Fulton Allem	1957–
(United States) Michael Allen	1959–
(Australia) Robert Allenby	1971–
(United States) Buddy Allin	1944–2007
(England) Percy Alliss	1897–1975
(England) Peter Alliss HoF	1931–2020
(Saudi Arabia) Othman Almulla	1986–
(Chile) Benjamín Alvarado	1985–
(Argentina) Rubén Alvarez	1961–2014
(Colombia) Jesús Amaya	1969–
(Trinidad and Tobago) (Canada) Stephen Ames	1964–
(South Africa) Cedric Amm	1940–
(Japan) Masaru Amono	1942–2006
(South Korea) An Byeong-hun	1991–
(Mexico) Abraham Ancer	1991–
(United States) Chris Anderson	1970–
(Scotland) Jamie Anderson	1842–1905
(Canada) Jerry Anderson	1955–2018
(United States) Mark Anderson	1986–
(Scotland) (Australia) P. C. Anderson	1871–1955
(Scotland) (United States) Willie Anderson HoF	1879–1910
(Sweden) Fredrik Andersson Hed	1972–
(United States) Billy Andrade	1964–
(Japan) Isao Aoki HoF	1942–
(Japan) Motomasa Aoki	1950–
(Thailand) Kiradech Aphibarnrat	1989–
(Australia) Stuart Appleby	1971–
(United States) Alex Aragon	1979–
(Japan) Kikuo Arai	1943–
(United States) George Archer	1939–2005
(England) Phillip Archer	1972–
(Philippines) Ben Arda	1929–2006
(United States) Connor Arendell	1990–
(United States) Ryan Armour	1976–
(Scotland) (United States) Tommy Armour HoF	1896–1968
(United States) Tommy Armour III	1959–
(United States) Wally Armstrong	1945–
(Spain) Adri Arnaus	1994–
(Australia) Scott Arnold	1985–
(Thailand) Wisut Artjanawat	1986–
(India) Arjun Atwal	1973–
(United States) Emlyn Aubrey	1964–
(Scotland) Laurie Auchterlonie	1867–1948
(Scotland) William Auchterlonie	1872–1963
(United States) Mike Austin	1910–2005
(United States) Woody Austin	1964–
(Sweden) Johan Axgren	1975–
(United States) Eric Axley	1974–
(United States) Dugan Aycock	1908–2001
(Myanmar) Mya Aye	1940–
(Scotland) Laurie Ayton, Jnr	1914–1989
(Scotland) Laurie Ayton, Snr	1884–1962
(United States) Paul Azinger	1960–

== B ==
(Sweden) Joakim Bäckström	1978–
(Australia) Richard Backwell	1963–
(Australia) Aaron Baddeley	1981–
(South Korea) Bae Sang-moon	1986–
(Scotland) Ross Bain	1975–
(South Africa) Hugh Baiocchi	1946–
(United States) Briny Baird	1972–
(United States) Butch Baird	1936–
(United States) Chris Baker	1986–
(England) Peter Baker	1967–
(South Africa) Vin Baker	19??–1990
(Australia) Ian Baker-Finch	1960–
(Spain) Salvador Balbuena	c. 1949–1979
(Canada) Al Balding	1924–2006
(England) Matthew Baldwin	1986–
(Scotland) Leslie Balfour-Melville	1854–1937
(Wales) (United States) Errie Ball	1910–2014
(England) John Ball HoF	1861–1940
(Australia) Ted Ball	1939–1995
(Spain) Manuel Ballesteros	1949–
(Spain) Seve Ballesteros HoF	1957–2011
(England) Brian Bamford	1935–2021
(Scotland) Harry Bannerman	1942–
(United States) Blayne Barber	1989–
(United States) Jerry Barber	1916–1994
(United States) Miller Barber	1931–2013
(United States) Rich Barcelo	1975–
(United States) Dave Barclay	1920–2009
(Scotland) (Canada) James A. Barclay	1923–2011
(England) Benn Barham	1976–
(France) Paul Barjon	1992–
(United States) Craig Barlow	1972–
(Scotland) Brian Barnes	1945–2019
(United States) Erik Barnes	1987–
(England) Jim Barnes HoF	1886–1966
(Australia) Kurt Barnes	1981–
(United States) Ricky Barnes	1981–
(United States) John Barnum	1911–1996
(Canada) Dave Barr	1952–
(United States) Todd Barranger	1968–
(United States) Herman Barron	1909–1978
(Canada) Chris Baryla	1982–
(South Africa) Christiaan Basson	1982–
(Canada) (United States) Ahmad Bateman	1961–
(United States) Brian Bateman	1973–
(United States) Ben Bates	1961–
(United States) Pat Bates	1969–
(United States) Rex Baxter	1936–2024
(United States) George Bayer	1925–2003
(United States) Andy Bean	1953–2023
(United States) Frank Beard	1939–
(Wales) Sion Bebb	1968–
(United States) Chip Beck	1956–
(Australia) Darren Beck	1978–
(United States) Cameron Beckman	1970–
(United States) Rich Beem	1970–
(United States) Notah Begay III	1972–
(United States) Russell Beiersdorf	1965–
(South Africa) Oliver Bekker	1984–
(United States) Charlie Beljan	1984–
(United States) Brad Bell	1961–
(United States) Deane Beman HoF	1938–
(England) Maurice Bembridge	1945–2024
(United States) John Benda	1947–
(United States) Jim Benepe	1963–
(Australia) Vic Bennetts	1944–
(United States) Brad Benjamin	1986–
(England) Stephen Bennett	1959–
(England) Warren Bennett	1971–
(England) Seve Benson	1986–
(Argentina) Jorge Berendt	1964–
(United States) David Berganio Jr.	1969–
(United States) Daniel Berger	1993–
(United States) Shane Bertsch	1970–
(Argentina) Enrique Bertolino	1912–1997
(Netherlands) Wil Besseling	1985–
(United States) Al Besselink	1923–2017
(United States) Bob Betley	1940–2020
(United States) Matt Bettencourt	1975–
(Australia) Reg Bettington	1900–1969
(England) Jon Bevan	1967–
(India) Gaganjeet Bhullar	1988–
(England) John Bickerton	1969–
(United States) Don Bies	1937–
(Denmark) Lucas Bjerregaard	1991–
(Sweden) Alexander Björk	1980–
(Denmark) Thomas Bjørn	1971–
(Norway) Henrik Bjørnstad	1979–
(United States) Ronnie Black	1958–
(United States) Woody Blackburn	1951–
(United States) Phil Blackmar	1957–
(Scotland) Edward Blackwell	1866–1945
(Scotland) David Blair	1917–1985
(United States) Zac Blair	1990–
(United States) Jay Don Blake	1958–
(United States) Homero Blancas	1938–
(United States) Kris Blanks	1972–
(Australia) Adam Bland	1982–
(South Africa) John Bland	1945–2023
(England) Richard Bland	1973–
(United States) Ryan Blaum	1983–
(Sweden) Jonas Blixt	1984–
(Australia) Rohan Blizard	1984–
(Scotland) Arnold Blyth	1856–1917
(United States) Marty Bohen	1942–
(United States) Jason Bohn	1973–
(United States) Justin Bolli	1976–
(United States) Charlie Bolling	1957–
(United States) Tommy Bolt HoF	1916–2008
(England) Michael Bonallack HoF	1934–2023
(Wales) Liam Bond	1970–
(Republic of Ireland) Hugh Boyle	1936–2015
(United States) Eric Booker	1963–
(Thailand) Boonchu Ruangkit *	1956–
(United States) Jim Booros	1951–
(Scotland) Fitz Boothby	1861–1889
(United States) Guy Boros	1964–
(United States) Julius Boros HoF	1920–1994
(Spain) Diego Borrego	1972–
(Norway) Knut Børsheim	1987–
(Switzerland) André Bossert	1963–
(South Africa) Desvonde Botes	1974–
(Australia) Marcus Both	1979–
(South Africa) Michiel Bothma	1973–
(England) Steven Bottomley	1965–
(France) Grégory Bourdy	1982–
(England) Ken Bousfield	1919–2000
(United States) Craig Bowden	1968–
(Australia) Steven Bowditch	1983–
(England) Richard Boxall	1961–
(United States) Bob Boyd	1955–2011
(England) Gary Boyd	1986–
(France) Auguste Boyer	1896–1956
(United States) Frank Boynton	c.1936–
(United States) Keegan Bradley	1986–
(United States) Michael Bradley	1966–
(Republic of Ireland) Harry Bradshaw	1913–1990
(United States) Mike Brady	1887–1972
(Scotland) James Braid HoF	1870–1950
(United States) Joseph Bramlett	1988–
(Scotland) Gordon Brand Jnr	1958–2019
(England) Gordon J. Brand	1955–2020
(United States) Mike Brannan	1955–2013
(United States) David Branshaw	1969–
(United States) Bill Brask	1946–
(United States) Jeff Brehaut	1963–
(South Africa) Merrick Bremner	1986–
(United States) Gay Brewer	1932–2007
(South Africa) Sid Brews	1899–1972
(Austria) Markus Brier	1968–
(United States) Danny Briggs	1960–
(United States) D. J. Brigman	1976–
(Sweden) Kalle Brink	1975–
(United States) Mike Brisky	1965–
(United States) Bill Britton	1955–
(South Africa) Tienie Britz	1945–
(England) Paul Broadhurst	1965–
(Sweden) Kristoffer Broberg	1986–
(United States) John Brodie	1935–
(England) Daniel Brooks	1987–
(United States) Mark Brooks	1961–
(United States) Al Brosch	1911–1975
(United States) Billy Ray Brown	1963–
(Scotland) David Brown	1861–1936
(Scotland) Eric Brown	1925–1986
(Scotland) Ken Brown	1957–
(New Zealand) Mark Brown	1975–
(United States) Pete Brown	1935–2015
(United States) Scott Brown	1983–
(United States) Olin Browne	1959–
(United States) Greg Bruckner	1959–
(United States) Bart Bryant	1962–2022
(United States) Brad Bryant	1954–
(Australia) Andrew Buckle	1982–
(United States) John Buczek	c. 1943–
(United States) Jace Bugg	1976–2003
(United States) Jason Buha	1975–
(South Africa) Hendrik Buhrmann	1963–
(United States) Johnny Bulla	1914–2003
(United States) Bronson Burgoon	1987–
(Australia) Barry Burgess	1945–
(United States) Billy Burke	1902–1972
(Canada) Cam Burke	1987–
(United States) Jack Burke Jr. HoF	1923–2024
(United States) Walter Burkemo	1918–1986
(South Africa) Dean Burmester	1989–
(United States) Bob Burns	1968–
(United States) George Burns	1949–
(Scotland) Jack Burns	1859–1927
(Northern Ireland) Raymond Burns	1973–
(United States) George H. W. Bush HoF	1924–2018
(England) Dick Burton	1907–1974
(United States) Rodney Butcher	1970–
(England) Peter Butler	1932–
(England) Andrew Butterfield	1972–
(United States) Eben Byers	1880–1932
(United States) Bob Byman	1955–
(United States) Jonathan Byrd	1978–
(United States) Sammy Byrd	1906–1981
(United States) Curt Byrum	1958–
(United States) Tom Byrum	1960–

*Thai, so sorted by first name.

== C ==
(Argentina) Ángel Cabrera	1969–
(Spain) Rafa Cabrera-Bello	1984–
(United States) Douglass Cadwallader	1884–1971
(England) Stuart Cage	1973–
(United States) John Cady	1866–1933
(Australia) Mike Cahill	1951–
(United States) John Paul Cain	1936–2017
(Zimbabwe) Ryan Cairns	1984–
(United States) Mark Calcavecchia	1960–
(United States) Rex Caldwell	1950–
(Italy) Giuseppe Calì	1952–
(France) François Calmels	1981–
(Jamaica) Delroy Cambridge	1949–
(United States) Chad Campbell	1974–
(Australia) Chris Campbell	1975–
(United States) Joe Campbell	1935–2024
(New Zealand) Michael Campbell	1969–
(United States) William C. Campbell HoF	1923–2013
(Spain) Jorge Campillo	1986–
(Puerto Rico) Rafael Campos	1988–
(Argentina) Ariel Cañete	1975–
(Spain) Alejandro Cañizares	1983–
(Spain) José María Cañizares	1947–
(Italy) Emanuele Canonica	1971–
(Argentina) José Cantero	1959–
(United States) Patrick Cantlay	1992–
(Denmark) Sebastian Cappelen	1990–
(Argentina) Miguel Ángel Carballo	1979–
(Argentina) Horacio Carbonetti	1947–
(Argentina) Luis Carbonetti	1953–
(United States) Jesse Carleton	1862–1921
(Sweden) Johan Carlsson	1986–
(Sweden) Magnus A. Carlsson	1980–
(United States) Mark Carnevale	1960–2024
(Republic of Ireland) Joe Carr HoF	1922–2004
(Canada) Donald Carrick	1906–1997
(England) David Carter	1972–
(United States) Jim Carter	1961–
(United States) Tom Carter	1968–
(England) Paul Casey	1977–
(United States) Billy Casper HoF	1931–2015
(United States) Ricky Castillo	2001–
(United States) Roberto Castro	1985–
(United States) John Catlin	1990–
(United States) Bud Cauley	1990–
(Zimbabwe) Marc Cayeux	1978–
(England) Alex Caygill	1940–
(Germany) Alex Čejka	1970–
(Argentina) Antonio Cerdá	1921–2010
(United States) Ron Cerrudo	1945–2024
(France) Christian Cévaër	1970–
(Australia) Greg Chalmers	1973–
(United States) Brandel Chamblee	1962–
(Taiwan) Chan Yih-shin	1977–
(Fiji) Dinesh Chand	1972–
(England) Andrew Chandler	1953–
(Thailand) Chapchai Nirat *	1983–
(United States) Dick Chapman	1911–1978
(England) Roger Chapman	1959–
(United States) Kevin Chappell	1986–
(Zimbabwe) Tongoona Charamba	1982–
(New Zealand) Bob Charles HoF	1936–
(Thailand) Chawalit Plaphol *	1974–
(India) Shiv Chawrasia	1978–
(United States) Barry Cheesman	1959–
(Taiwan) Chen Chien-chin	1940–
(Taiwan) Chen Tze-chung	1958–
(Taiwan) Chen Tze-ming	1952–
(United States) Don Cherry	1924–2018
(Malaysia) Danny Chia	1979–
(Thailand) Chinnarat Phadungsil *	1988–
(United States) Frank Chirkinian HoF	1926–2011
(South Korea) Cho Min-gyu	1988–
(South Korea) Choi Ho-sung	1973–
(United States) Jay Choi	1983–
(South Korea) K. J. Choi	1970–
(Sweden) Daniel Chopra	1973–
(England) Gary Christian	1971–
(United States) Michael Christie	1969–2004
(United States) Charlie Chung	1903–1998
(United States) David Chung	1990–
(United States) Stewart Cink	1973–
(United States) Henry Ciuci	1903–1986
(United States) Brian Claar	1959–
(South Africa) J. G. Claassen	1991–
(United States) Bobby Clampett	1960–
(Australia) Carnegie Clark	1881–1959
(United States) Clarence Clark	1907–1974
(England) Clive Clark	1945–
(England) Gary Clark	1971–
(England) Howard Clark	1954–
(United States) Jimmy Clark	1921–2010
(United States) Michael Clark II	1969–
(South Africa) Tim Clark	1975–
(Northern Ireland) Darren Clarke	1968–
(United States) Paul Claxton	1968–
(United States) Will Claxton	1981–
(England) Russell Claydon	1965–
(Australia) Mike Clayton	1957–
(United States) Keith Clearwater	1959–
(United States) Lennie Clements	1957–
(Argentina) José Cóceres	1963–
(United States) Russ Cochran	1958–
(United States) Charles Coe	1923–2001
(South Africa) Wallie Coetsee	1972–
(South Africa) George Coetzee	1986–
(United States) Mike Colandro	1953–2015
(United States) Jim Colbert	1941–2026
(South Africa) Bobby Cole	1948–
(Australia) Gavin Coles	1968–
(England) Neil Coles HoF	1934–
(England) Robert Coles	1972–
(United States) Bill Collins	1928–2006
(United States) Chad Collins	1978–
(United States) Wil Collins	1978–
(Italy) Federico Colombo	1987–
(Belgium) Nicolas Colsaerts	1982–
(Scotland) Andrew Coltart	1970–
(England) Archie Compston	1893–1962
(United States) Erik Compton	1979–
(United States) Charles Congdon	1909–1965
(United States) Tim Conley	1958–
(United States) Michael Connell	1975–
(United States) Frank Conner	1946–
(Australia) Steven Conran	1966–
(United States) Charles Coody	1937–
(United States) Buddy Cook	1926–
(United States) Jeff Cook	1961–
(United States) John Cook	1957–
(England) Derrick Cooper	1955–
(United States) Harry Cooper HoF	1904–2000
(United States) Pete Cooper	1914–1993
(United States) Fred Corcoran HoF	1905–1977
(United States) Jeff Coston	1955–
(United States) Keoke Cotner	1971–
(England) Henry Cotton HoF	1907–1987
(United States) Chris Couch	1973–
(Republic of Ireland) Richie Coughlan	1974–
(United States) Fred Couples HoF	1959–
(United States) Chuck Courtney	1940–
(Canada) Gary Cowan	1938–
(United States) P. J. Cowan	1967–
(United States) Kris Cox	1973–
(United States) Kurt Cox	1947–2018
(Wales) Simon Cox	1952–
(United States) Wiffy Cox	1896–1969
(Australia) Murray Crafter	1930−2017
(United States) Rick Cramer	1960–
(Australia) Bruce Crampton	1935–
(United States) Ben Crane	1976–
(England) Leonard Crawley	1903–1981
(United States) Tom Creavy	1911–1979
(Australia) Eric Cremin	1914–1973
(United States) Ben Crenshaw HoF	1952–
(Italy) Marco Crespi	1978–
(United States) Bing Crosby HoF	1903–1977
(United States) Nathaniel Crosby	1961–
(Scotland) (United States) Bobby Cruickshank	1894–1975
(Australia) Nick Cullen	1984–
(United States) Edward Cummins	1886–1926
(United States) Mike Cunning	1958–
(United States) Buster Cupit	1927–2023
(United States) Jacky Cupit	1938–2026
(United States) Rod Curl	1943–
(United States) Jon Curran	1987–
(England) Paul Curry	1961–
(United States) Ben Curtis	1977–

*Thai, so sorted by first name.

== D ==
(France) Marcel Dallemagne	1898–1994
(United States) Joe Daley	1960–
(United States) Rick Dalpos	1957–
(Northern Ireland) Fred Daly	1911–1990
(United States) John Daly	1966–
(United States) Robert Damron	1972–
(Sweden) Jens Dantorp	1989–
(Republic of Ireland) Eamonn Darcy	1952–
(England) Bernard Darwin HoF	1876–1961
(Brazil) Adilson da Silva	1972–
(Italy) Baldovino Dassù	1952–
(Wales) Rhys Davies	1985–
(England) Brian Davis	1974–
(England) Mark Davis	1964–
(Australia) Rodger Davis	1951–
(England) Stuart Davis	1973–
(United States) Johnny Dawson	1902–1986
(United States) Marco Dawson	1963–
(England) Peter Dawson	1950–
(United States) Glen Day	1965–
(Australia) Jason Day	1987–
(United States) Bryson DeChambeau	1993–
(Canada) Bryan DeCorso	1971–
(Wales) Craig Defoy	1947–
(Japan) Eitaro Deguchi	1948–
(South Africa) Louis de Jager	1987–
(Zimbabwe) Brendon de Jonge	1980–
(Canada) Graham DeLaet	1982–
(France) Sébastien Delagrange	1974–
(France) François Delamontagne	1979–
(Spain) Carlos del Moral	1985–
(United States) Jay Delsing	1960–
(Spain) Eduardo de la Riva	1982–
(Argentina) Fidel de Luca	1922–2007
(United States) Jimmy Demaret HoF	1910–1983
(United States) Todd Demsey	1972–
(England) Daniel Denison	1985–
(United States) Clark Dennis	1966–
(United States) Jim Dent	1939–2025
(Netherlands) Robert-Jan Derksen	1974–
(Argentina) Roberto De Vicenzo HoF	1923–2017
(Netherlands) Floris de Vries	1989–
(New Zealand) Paul Devenport	1966–
(Australia) Bruce Devlin	1937–
(United States) Joseph Dey HoF	1907–1991
(United States) Bubba Dickerson	1981–
(United States) Gardner Dickinson	1927–1998
(United States) Bob Dickson	1944–
(United States) Leo Diegel HoF	1899–1951
(United States) Terry Diehl	1949–
(Germany) Tobias Dier	1976–
(United States) Terry Dill	1939–
(United States) Chris DiMarco	1968–
(Brazil) Priscillo Diniz	1948–
(England) Robert Dinwiddie	1982–
(England) David Dixon	1977–
(Scotland) Chris Doak	1977–
(Wales) Stephen Dodd	1966–
(Namibia) Trevor Dodds	1959–
(United States) Leonard Dodson	1912–1997
(Australia) Andrew Dodt	1986–
(United States) Art Doering	1915–1988
(Scotland) Alexander Doleman	1836–1914
(Scotland) William Doleman	1838–1918
(Chile) Matías Domínguez	1992–
(England) Luke Donald	1977–
(United States) Mike Donald	1955–
(Wales) Jamie Donaldson	1975–
(Netherlands) Jan Dorrestein	1945–2023
(United States) Ed Dougherty	1947–
(England) Nick Dougherty	1982–
(United States) Dave Douglas	1918–1978
(Scotland) Findlay Douglas	1874–1959
(Scotland) Ted Douglas	1885–1956
(United States) Bruce Douglass	1953–
(United States) Dale Douglass	1936–2022
(United States) John Dowdall	1960–
(United States) Allen Doyle	1948–
(Republic of Ireland) Pat Doyle	1889–1971
(Scotland) Jim Draper	1925–2006
(Australia) Scott Draper	1974–
(Wales) Bradley Dredge	1973–
(Northern Ireland) Norman Drew	1932–
(United States) James Driscoll	1977–
(Scotland) Ross Drummond	1956–
(Scotland) Scott Drummond	1974–
(Scotland) David Drysdale	1975–
(France) Édouard Dubois	1989–
(France) Victor Dubuisson	1990–
(United States) Bob Duden	1920–1995
(United States) Ed Dudley	1901–1963
(United States) Jason Dufner	1977–
(United States) Ken Duke	1969–
(United States) Doug Dunakey	1963–
(Northern Ireland) Alan Dunbar	1990–
(Scotland) George Duncan	1883–1964
(Australia) Bill Dunk	1938–
(United States) George Dunlap	1908–2003
(United States) Scott Dunlap	1963–
(Republic of Ireland) Paul Dunne	1992–
(United States) Joe Durant	1964–
(England) Denis Durnian	1950–2025
(United States) Mortie Dutra	1899–1988
(United States) Olin Dutra	1901–1983
(United States) Bob Duval	1946–
(United States) David Duval	1971–
(United States) Pete Dye HoF	1925–2020
(England) Simon Dyson	1977–

== E ==
(South Africa) Bryce Easton	1987–
(United States) Bob Eastwood	1946–
(United States) R. W. Eaks	1952–
(England) Paul Eales	1963–
(England) Syd Easterbrook	1905–1975
(Argentina) Rafael Echenique	1980–
(Sweden) Johan Edfors	1975–
(England) James Douglas Edgar	1884–1921
(Japan) Seiji Ebihara	1949–
(Sweden) Pelle Edberg	1978–
(Sweden) Dennis Edlund	1965–
(France) Olivier Edmond	1970–
(France) Pascal Edmond	1971–
(United States) Danny Edwards	1951–
(United States) David Edwards	1956–
(United States) Joel Edwards	1961–
(United States) Kenneth Edwards	1886–1952
(Wales) Nigel Edwards	c.1968–
(United States) Chandler Egan	1884–1936
(United States) Walter Egan	1881–1971
(United States) David Eger	1952–
(United States) Bill Eggers	1932–1994
(United States) Dave Eichelberger	1943–
(United States) Dwight D. Eisenhower HoF	1890–1969
(United States) Brad Elder	1975–
(United States) Lee Elder	1934–2021
(Sweden) Mattias Eliasson	1975–
(Australia) Steve Elkington	1962–
(United States) John Elliott	1963–
(United States) John Ellis	1979–
(United States) Wes Ellis	1932–1984
(South Africa) Ernie Els HoF	1969–
(England) Jamie Elson	1981–
(England) Pip Elson	1954–
(Spain) Nacho Elvira	1987–
(England) Gary Emerson	1963–
(Chile) Guillermo Encina	1951–
(United States) Harris English	1989–
(United States) Jason Enloe	1974–
(United States) John Erickson	1964–
(Sweden) Klas Eriksson	1971–
(Sweden) Martin Erlandsson	1974–
(United States) Derek Ernst	1990–
(United States) Randy Erskine	1948–
(United States) Abe Espinosa	1889–1980
(United States) Al Espinosa	1891–1957
(United States) Bob Estes	1966–
(United States) Jim Estes	1964–
(Argentina) Joaquín Estévez	1984–
(United States) Chick Evans HoF	1890–1979
(Wales) Duncan Evans	1959–
(England) Gary Evans	1969–
(United States) Matt Every	1983–
(Canada) Bill Ezinicki	1924–2012

== F ==
(United States) Brad Fabel	1955–
(Sweden) Jens Fahrbring	1984–
(United States) Don Fairfield	1929–
(Scotland) James Ogilvie Fairlie	c.1830–????
(England) Nick Faldo HoF	1957–
(Scotland) John Fallon	1913–1985
(Wales) Oliver Farr	1988–
(United States) Johnny Farrell	1901–1988
(France) Marc Farry	1959–
(Sweden) Niclas Fasth	1972–
(United States) Derek Fathauer	1986–
(England) Max Faulkner	1916–2005
(Dominican Republic) Eugenio Faxas	1924–1999
(United States) Brad Faxon	1961–
(United States) George Fazio	1912–1986
(Northern Ireland) (United States) David Feherty	1958–
(United States) Rick Fehr	1962–
(Australia) Kim Felton	1975–
(United States) Keith Fergus	1954–
(Scotland) Bob Ferguson	c.1846–1915
(Australia) Mike Ferguson	1952–
(Scotland) Samuel Mure Fergusson	1855–1928
(Argentina) Miguel Fernández	1962–
(Argentina) Sebastián Fernández	1973–
(Argentina) Vicente Fernández	1946–
(Spain) Gonzalo Fernández-Castaño	1980–
(Scotland) Willie Fernie	1855–1924
(United States) Jim Ferree	1931–2023
(England) Kenneth Ferrie	1978–
(Australia) (United States) Jim Ferrier	1915–1986
(United States) Mike Fetchick	1922–2012
(United States) Forrest Fezler	1949–2018
(South Africa) Darren Fichardt	1975–
(United States) Tony Finau	1989–
(England) Richard Finch	1977–
(United States) Dow Finsterwald	1929–2022
(United States) Ed Fiori	1953–2025
(United States) Johnny Fischer	1912–1984
(United States) Todd Fischer	1969–
(England) Oliver Fisher	1988–
(England) Ross Fisher	1980–
(South Africa) Trevor Fisher Jnr	1979–
(England) Matt Fitzpatrick	1994–
(United States) Pat Fitzsimons	1950–
(Australia) Nick Flanagan	1984–
(United States) John Flannery	1962–
(United States) Jack Fleck	1921–2014
(United States) Marty Fleckman	1944–
(England) Tommy Fleetwood	1991–
(United States) Bruce Fleisher	1948–2021
(United States) Steve Flesch	1967–
(Canada) Pat Fletcher	1916–1985
(England) Maurice Flitcroft	1929–2007
(Sweden) Oscar Florén	1984–
(United States) Martin Flores	1982–
(United States) Raymond Floyd HoF	1942–
(United States) Kevin Foley	1987–
(Australia) Paul Foley	c. 1959–
(United States) Jerry Foltz	1962–
(Germany) Dominic Foos	1997–
(England) Charlie Ford	1985–
(United States) Doug Ford HoF	1922–2018
(England) Matt Ford	1978–
(France) Julien Foret	1982–
(Sweden) Anders Forsbrand	1961–
(United States) Dan Forsman	1958–
(Scotland) Alastair Forsyth	1976–
(England) Mark Foster	1975–
(United States) John Fought	1954–
(Scotland) (United States) James Foulis	1871–1928
(United States) Jim Foulis	1903–1969
(South Africa) John Fourie	1939–
(Australia) Peter Fowler	1959–
(United States) Rickie Fowler	1988–
(United States) William C. Fownes Jr.	1877–1950
(New Zealand) Ryan Fox	1987–
(United States) Steven Fox	1991–
(Paraguay) Ángel Franco	1958–
(Paraguay) Carlos Franco	1965–
(Canada) Brent Franklin	1966–
(United States) Harold Fraser	1872–1945
(Australia) Marcus Fraser	1978–
(Mexico) Óscar Fraustro	1982–
(United States) Harrison Frazar	1971–
(United States) Robin Freeman	1959–
(United States) Emmet French	1886–1947
(Paraguay) Raúl Fretes	1965–
(Eswatini) Paul Friedlander	1970–
(United States) Bob Friend	1963–
(United States) Steve Friesen	1977–
(Canada) Brad Fritsch	1977–
(Germany) Florian Fritsch	1985–
(South Africa) Dylan Frittelli	1990–
(South Africa) David Frost	1959–
(United States) Bob Fry	1922–1993
(England) Ed Fryatt	1971–
(United States) Tadd Fujikawa	1991–
(Japan) Saburo Fujiki	1955–
(Japan) Yoshinori Fujimoto	1989–
(Japan) Toyokazu Fujishima	1981–
(Japan) Hiroyuki Fujita	1969–
(Japan) Keiichiro Fukabori	1968–
(Japan) Yoshimitsu Fukuzawa	1963–
(Sweden) Pierre Fulke	1971–
(Japan) Yasuhiro Funatogawa	1955–
(United States) Fred Funk	1956–
(United States) Rod Funseth	1933–1985
(United States) Ed Furgol	1917–1997
(United States) Marty Furgol	1916–2005
(United States) Jim Furyk	1970–

== G ==
(Italy) Lorenzo Gagli	1985–
(England) George Gadd	1890–1957
(United States) Tommy Gainey	1975–
(United States) Sandy Galbraith	c. 1947–
(Australia) Terry Gale	1946–
(Scotland) Bernard Gallacher	1949–
(Scotland) Stephen Gallacher	1974–
(United States) Jeff Gallagher	1964–
(United States) Jim Gallagher Jr.	1961–
(Scotland) John Gallagher	1981–
(Spain) Ángel Gallardo	1943–
(Australia) David Galloway	1951–
(United States) Robert Gamez	1968–
(England) Chris Gane	1974–
(India) Rahil Gangjee	1978–
(United States) Stephen Gangluff	1975–
(France) Jean Garaïalde	1934–
(England) Ian Garbutt	1972–
(Spain) Sergio García	1980–
(Spain) Jordi García Pinto	1990–
(Australia) Scott Gardiner	1976–
(United States) Buddy Gardner	1955–
(United States) Robert A. Gardner	1890–1956
(England) John Garner	1947–
(United States) Tom Garner	1961–
(United States) Brice Garnett	1982–
(United States) Bill Garrett	1940–2010
(Spain) Antonio Garrido	1944–
(Spain) Germán Garrido	1948–
(Spain) Ignacio Garrido	1972–
(United States) Robert Garrigus	1977–
(United States) Bobby Gates	1985–
(Australia) Daniel Gaunt	1978–
(United States) Brian Gay	1971–
(England) Adam Gee	1980–
(United States) Al Geiberger	1937–
(United States) Brent Geiberger	1968–
(United States) James Gentle	1904–1986
(Australia) Corey Gerrard	1985–
(India) Gaurav Ghei	1968–
(United States) Vic Ghezzi	1910–1976
(United States) Fred Gibson	1947–
(United States) Kelly Gibson	1964–
(Canada) Rick Gibson	1961–
(United States) Brendan Gielow	1987–
(United States) Gibby Gilbert	1941–
(United States) Larry Gilbert	1942–1998
(United States) Bob Gilder	1950–
(United States) Vinny Giles	1943–
(England) David Gilford	1965–
(Canada) Derek Gillespie	1978–
(United States) Nick Gilliam	1978–
(United States) Tom Gillis	1968–
(Singapore) Samson Gimson	1964–
(Spain) Ivó Giner	1981–
(Australia) Stewart Ginn	1949–
(United States) Harry Givan	1911–1999
(United States) Bill Glasson	1960–
(United States) Todd Gleaton	1968–
(Australia) David Gleeson	1978–
(United States) Lucas Glover	1979–
(United States) Randy Glover	1941–
(United States) Bob Goalby	1929–2022
(England) Luke Goddard	1988–
(New Zealand) Walter Godfrey	1941–
(United States) Matt Gogel	1971–
(Australia) Mathew Goggin	1974–
(United States) Willie Goggin	1906–1979
(Japan) Hiroshi Gohda	1964–
(United States) Aaron Goldberg	1985–
(United States) Johnny Golden	1896–1936
(England) Philip Golding	1962–
(Argentina) Fabián Gómez	1978–
(United States) Jaime Gomez	1967–
(Argentina) Rafael Gómez	1967–
(France) Jean-Baptiste Gonnet	1982–
(United States) Andres Gonzales	1983–
(United States) Ernie Gonzalez	1961–2020
(Brazil) Jaime Gonzalez	1954–
(Argentina) Ricardo González	1969–
(Argentina) Rodolfo González	1967–
(United States) Mike Goodes	1956–
(United States) Johnny Goodman	1909–1970
(South Africa) Retief Goosen HoF	1969–
(United States) Scott Gordon	1981–
(United States) Jason Gore	1974–
(United States) David Gossett	1979–
(United States) Steve Gotsche	1961–
(Portugal) Ricardo Gouveia	1991–
(United States) Jeff Gove	1971–
(Australia) Paul Gow	1970–
(Argentina) Estanislao Goya	1988–
(United States) Paul Goydos	1964–
(South Africa) Branden Grace	1988–
(Australia) Wayne Grady	1957–
(United States) Herb Graffis HoF	1893–1989
(Australia) David Graham HoF	1946–
(United States) Lou Graham	1938–2026
(Finland) Joonas Granberg	1986–
(Republic of Ireland) Stephen Grant	1977–
(Italy) Ugo Grappasonni	1922–1999
(United States) Hubert Green HoF	1946–2018
(United States) Jimmy Green	1969–
(United States) Ken Green	1958–
(Australia) Nathan Green	1975–
(Australia) Richard Green	1971–
(United States) Bert Greene	1944–
(United States) Bobby Greenwood	1938–
(England) Malcolm Gregson	1943–2024
(Australia) Matthew Griffin	1983–
(England) David Griffiths	1980–
(Argentina) Emiliano Grillo	1992–
(United States) Mike Grob	1964–
(South Africa) Vaughn Groenewald	1974–
(United States) Gary Groh	1944–
(Sweden) Mathias Grönberg	1970–
(France) Sébastien Gros	1989–
(United States) Jack Grout	1910–1989
(China) Guan Tianlang	1998–
(France) Jean-Louis Guépy	1967–
(France) Julien Guerrier	1985–
(United States) Jesse Guilford	1895–1962
(United States) Ralph Guldahl HoF	1911–1987
(United States) Scott Gump	1965–
(Scotland) Jimmy Gunn	1980–
(Germany) Christoph Günther	1975–
(Sweden) Peter Gustafsson	1976–
(United States) Jon Gustin	1932–1994
(United States) Luke Guthrie	1990–
(United States) Scott Gutschewski	1976–
(Scotland) William Guy	1966–
(Argentina) Miguel Guzmán	1961–

== H ==
(United States) Bill Haas	1982–
(United States) Fred Haas	1916–2004
(United States) Hunter Haas	1976–
(United States) Jay Haas	1953–
(United States) Jerry Haas	1963–
(Denmark) Mark Haastrup	1984–
(Scotland) (United States) Clarence Hackney	1894–1941
(United States) Chesson Hadley	1987–
(Canada) Adam Hadwin	1987–
(Sweden) Joakim Haeggman	1969–
(Japan) Yutaka Hagawa	1957–
(Norway) Morten Hagen	1974–
(United States) Walter Hagen HoF	1892–1969
(Sweden) Anders Haglund	1964–
(United States) James Hahn	1981–
(United States) John Hahn	1989–
(South Africa) Anton Haig	1986–
(England) Matt Haines	1989–
(United States) Paul Haley II	1988–
(England) Jeff Hall	1957–
(United States) Walter Hall	1947–
(United States) Gary Hallberg	1958–
(Canada) Dan Halldorson	1952–2015
(United States) Jim Hallet	1960–
(Japan) Harumitsu Hamano	1957–
(United States) Bob Hamilton	1916–1990
(United States) Todd Hamilton	1965–
(United States) Donnie Hammond	1957–
(United States) Phil Hancock	1953–2024
(United States) Kirk Hanefeld	1956–
(Sweden) Chris Hanell	1973–
(Denmark) Anders Hansen	1970–
(Denmark) Anders Schmidt Hansen	1978–
(Denmark) Joachim B. Hansen	1990–
(Denmark) Søren Hansen	1974–
(Sweden) Peter Hanson	1977–
(Japan) Mitsuo Harada	1964–
(United States) Chick Harbert	1915–1992
(South Africa) Justin Harding	1986–
(United States) Bob Harlow HoF	1899–1954
(United States) Brian Harman	1987–
(United States) Butch Harmon	1943–
(United States) Claude Harmon	1916–1989
(United States) Dick Harmon	1947–2006
(United States) Matt Harmon	1985–
(United States) Paul Harney	1929–2011
(United States) Chandler Harper	1914–2004
(Republic of Ireland) Pádraig Harrington	1971–
(Australia) Jack Harris	1922–2014
(United States) John Harris	1952–2025
(United States) Labron Harris	1908–1995
(United States) Labron Harris Jr.	1941–
(United States) Dutch Harrison	1910–1982
(England) William Harrold	1988–
(United States) Dick Hart	1935–2013
(United States) Dudley Hart	1968–
(United States) Jeff Hart	1960–
(United States) Rick Hartmann	1959–2025
(Denmark) Andreas Hartø	1988–
(United States) Scott Harvey	1978–
(Australia) Mike Harwood	1959–
(Japan) Katsuji Hasegawa	1946–
(United States) Steve Haskins	1958–
(Egypt) Hassan Hassanein	1916–1957
(United States) Morris Hatalsky	1951–
(England) Tyrrell Hatton	1991–
(England) Arthur Havers	1898–1980
(France) Grégory Havret	1976–
(South Africa) Jeff Hawkes	1953–
(United States) Fred Hawkins	1923–2014
(England) John Hawksworth	1961–
(Scotland) Alex Hay	1933–2011
(Japan) Yoshiro Hayashi	1922–2012
(South Africa) Dale Hayes	1952–
(United States) J. P. Hayes	1965–
(United States) Mark Hayes	1949–2018
(United States) Clayton Heafner	1914–1960
(United States) Vance Heafner	1954–2012
(United States) Jerry Heard	1947–
(Canada) David Hearn	1979–
(England) James Heath	1983–
(France) Benjamin Hébert	1987–
(United States) Jay Hebert	1923–1997
(United States) Lionel Hebert	1928–2000
(Sweden) Peter Hedblom	1970–
(Canada) Wes Heffernan	1977–
(United States) Mike Heinen	1967–
(United States) Bob Heintz	1970–
(Australia) Scott Hend	1973–
(Scotland) Scott Henderson	1969–
(United States) Matt Hendrix	1981–
(New Zealand) Michael Hendry	1979–
(Sweden) Fredrik Henge	1974–
(United States) Nolan Henke	1964–
(United States) Russell Henley	1989–
(South Africa) Allan Henning	1944–
(South Africa) Graham Henning	c. 1940–
(South Africa) Harold Henning	1934–2004
(South Africa) Nic Henning	1969–
(United States) Brian Henninger	1962–
(Sweden) Oskar Henningsson	1985–
(United States) Bunky Henry	1944–2018
(United States) J. J. Henry	1975–
(Scotland) Scott Henry	1987–
(Australia) Mark Hensby	1971–
(United States) Berry Henson	1979–
(England) James Hepworth	1975–
(Scotland) Fred Herd	1873–1954
(Scotland) Sandy Herd	1868–1944
(United States) Jim Herman	1977–
(Colombia) Eduardo Herrera	1965–
(United States) Fred Herreshoff	1888–1920
(United States) Davidson Herron	1897–1956
(United States) Tim Herron	1970–
(United States) Justin Hicks	1974–
(Indonesia) Rory Hie	1973–
(United States) Ryan Hietala	1988–
(Japan) Go Higaki	1976–
(Japan) Shigemasa Higaki	1971–
(Japan) Satoshi Higashi	1960–
(Australia) Jake Higginbottom	1993–
(Republic of Ireland) David Higgins	1972–
(South Africa) Garrick Higgo	1999–
(England) Marcus Higley	1974–
(United States) Dave Hill	1937–2011
(United States) Jason Hill	1971–
(United States) Mike Hill	1939–2025
(England) Harold Hilton HoF	1869–1942
(England) Patrick Hine	1932–
(United States) Jimmy Hines	1903–1986
(United States) Lon Hinkle	1949–
(United States) Larry Hinson	1944–
(Japan) Takenori Hiraishi	1960–
(Japan) Tetsuji Hiratsuka	1971–
(Japan) Satoru Hirota	1973–
(United States) Babe Hiskey	1938–
(England) Jimmy Hitchcock	1930–2015
(Sweden) Gabriel Hjertstedt	1971–
(Canada) Glen Hnatiuk	1965–
(South Korea) Hur Suk-ho	1973–
(South Africa) Justin Hobday	1963–
(South Africa) Simon Hobday	1940–2017
(Scotland) Jack Hobens	1880–1944
(United States) Scott Hoch	1955–
(Northern Ireland) Michael Hoey	1979–
(United States) Charley Hoffman	1976–
(United States) Morgan Hoffmann	1989–
(United States) Ben Hogan HoF	1912–1997
(England) Ernest Holderness	1890–1968
(United States) Tony Holguin	1926–2009
(United States) Mike Holland	1956–
(United States) J. B. Holmes	1982–
(United States) Bud Holscher	1930–2021
(United States) Jim Holtgrieve	1947–
(United States) Max Homa	1990–
(Canada) Wilf Homenuik	1935–
(England) Charles Hooman	1887–1969
(United States) Bob Hope HoF	1903–2003
(Australia) Ray Hore	1954–
(United States) P. H. Horgan III	1960–
(South Africa) Keith Horne	1971–
(England) Reg Horne	1908–1984
(United States) Billy Horschel	1986–
(England) David Horsey	1985–
(Spain) Antonio Hortal	1988–
(England) Tommy Horton	1941–2017
(Japan) Hidemasa Hoshino	1977–
(Japan) Kenji Hosoishi	1937–
(Japan) Kazuhiko Hosokawa	1970–
(Spain) Domingo Hospital	1958–
(United States) Beau Hossler	1995–
(Wales) Garry Houston	1971–
(Scotland) Barclay Howard	1953–2008
(United States) Charles Howell III	1979–
(England) David Howell	1975–
(United States) Ryan Howison	1966–
(Taiwan) Hsieh Min-Nan *	1940–
(Taiwan) Hsieh Yu-shu	1960–
(Taiwan) Hsieh Yung-yo *	1934–
(Taiwan) Hsu Chi-san	1938–
(Taiwan) Hsu Sheng-san	c.1942–
(England) John Hudson	1945–
(Wales) Brian Huggett	1936–2024
(Australia) Bradley Hughes	1967–
(South Africa) Jean Hugo	1975–
(United States) John Huh	1990–
(Scotland) David Huish	1944–
(Netherlands) Daan Huizing	1990–
(United States) Mike Hulbert	1958–
(Denmark) Jeppe Huldahl	1982–
(United States) Ed Humenik	1959–
(England) Warren Humphreys	1952–
(England) Bernard Hunt	1930–2013
(England) Guy Hunt	1947–
(Scotland) Adam Hunter	1963–2011
(United States) Robert Hunter	1886–1971
(Scotland) William Hunter	18??–????
(Scotland) (United States) Willie Hunter	1892–1968
(South Korea) Hur In-hoi	1987–
(England) Simon D. Hurley	1963–
(United States) Billy Hurley III	1978–
(Pakistan) Taimur Hussain	1974–
(United States) Arthur Hussey	1882–1915
(United States) John Huston	1961–
(Zimbabwe) (South Africa) Ian Hutchings	1968–
(United States) Jesse Hutchins	1981–
(Zimbabwe) (South Africa) Denis Hutchinson	1932–
(Scotland) (United States) Jock Hutchison HoF	1884–1977
(England) Sam Hutsby	1988–
(South Korea) Hwang Inn-choon	1974–
(South Korea) Hwang Jung-gon	1992–
(United States) Bill Hyndman	1915–2001

* Hsieh is his family name.

== I ==
(Japan) Tatsuhiko Ichihara	1978–
(Japan) Kōki Idoki	1961–
(Japan) Yuji Igarashi	1968–
(Japan) Yuta Ikeda	1985–
(New Zealand) Bradley Iles	1983–
(Finland) Mikko Ilonen	1979–
(United States) Daniel Im	1985–
(Japan) Ryuji Imada	1976–
(Japan) Katsumune Imai	1956–
(Japan) Yasuharu Imano	1973–
(South Africa) Trevor Immelman	1979–
(South Africa) Hugh Inggs	1938–
(United States) Joe Inman	1947–
(United States) John Inman	1962–
(Japan) Kouichi Inoue	1946–
(Japan) Makoto Inoue	1956–
(Malaysia) Arie Irawan	1990–2019
(Japan) Tsutomu Irie	1948–
(United States) Hale Irwin HoF	1945–
(United States) Tripp Isenhour	1968–
(United States) David Ishii	1955–
(Japan) Hiroshi Ishii	1941–2006
(Japan) Tomoo Ishii	1923–2022
(Japan) Ryo Ishikawa	1991–
(Japan) Yoshiyuki Isomura	1955–
(United States) Bill Israelson	1957–
(Japan) Eiichi Itai	1951–
(United States) Don Iverson	1945–
(Japan) Yoshihisa Iwashita	1949–
(Japan) Hiroshi Iwata	1981–
(Japan) Toshimitsu Izawa	1968–
(Japan) Pete Izumikawa	1956–

== J ==
(England) Tony Jacklin HoF	1944–
(England) Ben Jackson	1967–
(United States) David Jackson	1964–
(England) John Jacobs HoF	1925–2017
(United States) John Jacobs	1945–
(United States) Tommy Jacobs	1935–2022
(United States) Peter Jacobsen	1954–
(Sweden) Freddie Jacobson	1974–
(United States) Gary Jacobson	c.1953–
(France) Raphaël Jacquelin	1974–
(United States) Barry Jaeckel	1949–
(England) David Jagger	1949–
(South Africa) Derek James	1960–
(England) Lee S. James	1973–
(United States) Louis N. James	1882–1935
(England) Mark James	1953–
(United States) Jim Jamieson	1943–2018
(Scotland) Scott Jamieson	1983–
(Thailand) Jazz Janewattananond	1995–
(South Korea) Jang Dong-kyu	1988–
(South Korea) Jang Ik-jae	1973–
(United States) Don January	1929–2023
(United States) Lee Janzen	1964–
(Australia) Steven Jeffress	1975–
(United States) Dan Jenkins HoF	1928–2019
(United States) Tom Jenkins	1947–
(South Korea) Jin Jeong	1990–
(Sweden) Steven Jeppesen	1984–
(United States) Joe Jimenez	1926–2007
(Spain) Miguel Ángel Jiménez	1964–
(England) Nick Job	1949–
(United States) Brandt Jobe	1965–
(Norway) Eirik Tage Johansen	1982–
(Sweden) Per-Ulrik Johansson	1966–
(United States) Andrew Johnson	1972–
(United States) Dustin Johnson	1984–
(United States) Eric Johnson	1962–
(United States) Howie Johnson	1925–2015
(United States) Kevin Johnson	1967–
(United States) Mark Johnson	1954–
(Wales) Richard Johnson	1972–
(Sweden) Richard S. Johnson	1976–
(United States) Tom Johnson	1981–
(United States) Zach Johnson	1976–
(Scotland) (Canada) Al Johnston	1932–
(England) Andrew Johnston	1989–
(United States) Bill Johnston	1925–2021
(England) J. F. Johnston	18??–????
(United States) Jimmy Johnston	1896–1969
(Zimbabwe) Tony Johnstone	1956–
(United States) Bobby Jones HoF	1902–1971
(Australia) Brendan Jones	1975–
(Australia) Brian Jones	1951–
(Northern Ireland) David Jones	1947–
(United States) Gene Jones	1957–
(United States) Grier Jones	1946–
(United States) Kent Jones	1967–
(Australia) Matt Jones	1980–
(United States) Orus Jones	1867–1963
(United States) Robert Trent Jones HoF	1906–2000
(United States) Steve Jones	1958–
(Sweden) Michael Jonzon	1972–
(United States) Mike Joyce	1939–2020
(United States) Jeff Julian	1961–2004
(Thailand) Pariya Junhasavasdikul	1984–
(Argentina) José Jurado	1899–1971
(United States) Steve Jurgensen	1961–
(United States) Ab Justice	1934–2013

== K ==
(Japan) Shintaro Kai	1981–
(Japan) Toshimitsu Kai	1956–
(Japan) Takeshi Kajikawa	1971–
(Finland) Roope Kakko	1982–
(France) Alexandre Kaleka	1987–
(Japan) Takashi Kamiyama	1973–
(United States) Brian Kamm	1961–
(South Africa) James Kamte	1982–
(Zimbabwe) Nasho Kamungeremu	c.1973–2007
(United States) Craig Kanada	1968–
(Japan) Seiichi Kanai	1940–2022
(Japan) Kazuo Kanayama	1952–
(Japan) Yoshinori Kaneko	1961–
(Japan) Akio Kanemoto	1968–
(Japan) Takashi Kanemoto	1970–
(United States) Anthony Kang	1972–
(South Korea) Kang Sung-hoon *	1987–
(South Korea) Kang Wook-soon *	1966–
(South Africa) Richard Kaplan	1962–
(India) Shiv Kapur	1982–
(Finland) Toni Karjalainen	1979–
(United States) Richie Karl	1944–
(Sweden) Rikard Karlberg	1986–
(Sweden) Robert Karlsson	1969–
(South Africa) (Greece) Peter Karmis	1981–
(Japan) Hideki Kase	1959–
(United States) Monty Kaser	1941–2009
(Japan) Daisuke Kataoka	1988–
(Japan) Shingo Katayama	1973–
(Japan) Isao Katsumata	1937–
(United States) Smylie Kaufman	1991–
(Japan) Toshiharu Kawada	1947–
(Japan) Ryoken Kawagishi	1966–
(Japan) Nozomi Kawahara	1970–
(Japan) Hiroo Kawai	1971–
(Japan) Masahiro Kawamura	1993–
(Japan) Masayuki Kawamura	1967–
(Japan) Koichiro Kawano	1981–
(Canada) Jack Kay Jr.	1964–
(United States) Jonathan Kaye	1970–
(Germany) Martin Kaymer	1984–
(United States) Herman Keiser	1914–2003
(United States) Al Kelley	1935–2017
(United States) Jerry Kelly	1966–
(United States) John Kelly	1984–
(United States) Troy Kelly	1978–
(United States) Skip Kendall	1964–
(New Zealand) Terry Kendall	1947–2002
(Australia) Brad Kennedy	1974–
(United States) Tom Kerrigan	1895–1964
(United States) Darrell Kestner	1953–
(South Africa) Bruce Keyter	c. 1930–
(India) Rashid Khan	1991–
(England) Simon Khan	1972–
(Scotland) Tom Kidd	18??–1884
(United States) Jack Kiefer	1940–1999
(Germany) Maximilian Kieffer	1990–
(Japan) Jun Kikuchi	1973–
(Japan) Shoji Kikuchi	1944–
(United States) J. J. Killeen	1981–
(United States) Anthony Kim	1985–
(South Korea) Kim Bi-o **	1990–
(South Korea) Kim Hyung-sung **	1980–
(South Korea) Kim Jong-duck	1961–
(South Korea) Kim Kyung-tae **	1986–
(South Korea) Kim Meen-whee **	1992–
(United States) Michael Kim	1993–
(South Korea) Kim Seung-hyuk **	1986–
(South Korea) Kim Si-woo	1995–
(South Korea) Tom Kim	2002–
(United States) John Kimbell	1969–
(Japan) Masanobu Kimura	1960–
(England) Michael King	1950–
(England) Sam King	1911–2003
(South Africa) James Kingston	1965–
(Republic of Ireland) Jimmy Kinsella	1939–
(United States) Chris Kirk	1985–
(Australia) (United States) Joe Kirkwood, Sr.	1897–1970
(Australia) (United States) Joe Kirkwood, Jr.	1920–2006
(Scotland) Hugh Kirkaldy	1868–1897
(United States) Kevin Kisner	1984–
(United States) Tom Kite HoF	1949–
(Japan) Mitsuhiro Kitta	1942–
(Japan) Tadashi Kitta	1934–2003
(United States) Patton Kizzire	1986–
(Denmark) Søren Kjeldsen	1975–
(United States) Jeff Klauk	1977–
(United States) Willie Klein	1901–1957
(United States) Dick Knight	1929–1991
(Scotland) James Knight	c.1840–????
(United States) Colt Knost	1985–
(United States) Kenny Knox	1956–
(Scotland) Russell Knox	1985–
(United States) Jason Knutzon	1976–
(Japan) Fujio Kobayashi	1944–
(Japan) Masanori Kobayashi	1976–
(United States) Gary Koch	1952–
(United States) Chuck Kocsis	1913–2006
(Japan) Satoshi Kodaira	1989–
(United States) Brooks Koepka	1990–
(Norway) Espen Kofstad	1987–
(United States) Ben Kohles	1990–
(United States) Jason Kokrak	1985–
(Japan) Tomohiro Kondo	1977–
(Japan) Takaaki Kono	1940–2010
(Finland) Mikko Korhonen	1980–
(Canada) George Knudson	1937–1989
(United States) Greg Kraft	1964–
(United States) Kelly Kraft	1988–
(United States) Billy Kratzert	1952–
(United States) Cliff Kresge	1968–
(United States) Ted Kroll	1919–2002
(South Africa) Jbe' Kruger	1986–
(Japan) Kenichi Kuboya	1972–
(United States) Matt Kuchar	1978–
(United States) Hank Kuehne	1975–
(United States) Trip Kuehne	1972–
(Australia) Rick Kulacz	1985–
(India) Chiragh Kumar	1983–
(United States) Gene Kunes	1909–1965
(Japan) Masahiro Kuramoto	1955–
(Taiwan) Kuo Chie-Hsiung	1940–
(Japan) Takashi Kurihara	1947–
(Japan) Masaji Kusakabe	1946–
(Japan) Mitsutaka Kusakabe	1968–
(Japan) Katsunori Kuwabara	1969–
(Japan) Shoichi Kuwabara	1969–
(Myanmar) Kyi Hla Han ^	1961–2022

* Kang is the family name.
** Kim is the family name.
^ Kyi is from Myanmar, and so is sorted by his first listed name.

== L ==
(United States) Doug LaBelle II	1975–
(Australia) Bronson La'Cassie	1983–
(England) Arthur Lacey	1904–1979
(Netherlands) Maarten Lafeber	1974–
(United States) Ky Laffoon	1908–1984
(Sweden) Joakim Lagergren	1991–
(India) Anirban Lahiri	1987–
(Scotland) Johnny Laidlay	1860–1940
(Scotland) Martin Laird	1982–
(Singapore) Lam Chih Bing	1976–
(Scotland) Henry Lamb	1844–1893
(United States) Derek Lamely	1980–
(Germany) Moritz Lampert	1992–
(United States) Neal Lancaster	1962–
(United States) Robert Landers	1944–
(United States) Ralph Landrum	1957–
(United States) Andrew Landry	1987–
(England) Barry Lane	1960–
(New Zealand) Matthew Lane	1968–
(France) Romain Langasque	1995–
(Germany) Bernhard Langer HoF	1957–
(United States) Franklin Langham	1968–
(United States) Scott Langley	1989–
(Sweden) Mats Lanner	1961–
(United States) Larry Laoretti	1939–
(Spain) José Manuel Lara	1977–
(United States) Allan Lard	1866–1946
(Spain) Pablo Larrazábal	1983–
(Norway) Jan-Are Larsen	1976–
(Philippines) Antonio Lascuña	1970–
(Scotland) Paul Lawrie	1969–
(Republic of Ireland) Peter Lawrie	1974–
(Scotland) Jimmy Lawson	1886–1962
(Australia) Scott Laycock	1971–
(Australia) Stephen Leaney	1969–
(Sierra Leone) James Lebbie	1988–
(Argentina) Jorge Ledesma	1932–2001
(Scotland) Craig Lee	1977–
(South Korea) (New Zealand) Danny Lee	1990–
(England) Daren Lee	1965–
(South Korea) Lee Dong-hwan ^	1987–
(United States) Han Lee	1977–
(South Korea) Lee Kyoung-hoon ^	1991–
(United States) Richard H. Lee	1987–
(Canada) Richard T. Lee	1990–
(England) Robert Lee	1961–
(South Korea) Lee Sung ^	1980–
(United States) Herbert Leeds	1855–1930
(England) Arthur Lees	1908–1992
(Canada) Ian Leggatt	1965–
(India) A.S. Lehal	1981–
(United States) Tom Lehman	1959–
(Australia) Marc Leishman	1983–
(United States) Tony Lema	1934–1966
(United States) Justin Leonard	1972–
(Canada) Stan Leonard	1915–2005
(Malaysia) Ben Leong	1986–
(Canada) James Lepp	1983–
(United States) Michael Letzig	1980–
(South Africa) Gavan Levenson	1953–
(France) Thomas Levet	1968–
(United States) Wayne Levi	1952–
(United States) Spencer Levin	1984–
(France) Alexander Lévy	1990–
(United States) Bob Lewis	1944–2021
(United States) J. L. Lewis	1960–2019
(England) Tom Lewis	1991–
(England) Steve Lewton	1983–
(China) Li Chao	1980–
(China) Li Hao-Tong	1995–
(China) Liang Wenchong	1978–
(United States) Frank Lickliter	1969–
(South Africa) Brett Liddle	1970–
(United States) Bruce Lietzke	1951–2018
(Portugal) (France) José-Filipe Lima	1981–
(Taiwan) Lin Keng-chi *	1966–
(Taiwan) Lin Wen-tang *	1974–
(South Africa) Bobby Lincoln	1953–
(France) Thomas Linard	1988–
(United States) Nicholas Lindheim	1984–
(United States) Pat Lindsey	1952–
(England) Clifford Lingen	1881–1907
(Sweden) David Lingmerth	1987–
(United States) (Spain) Pedro Linhart	1962–
(United States) David Lipsky	1988–
(United States) Luke List	1985–
(New Zealand) John Lister	1947–
(Scotland) Euan Little	1976–
(United States) Lawson Little HoF	1910–1968
(England) Sam Little	1975–
(United States) Gene Littler HoF	1930–2019
(Wales) David Llewellyn	1951–
(England) Joe Lloyd	1864–????
(United States) Edward Loar	1977–
(South Africa) Bobby Locke HoF	1917–1987
(England) Gary Lockerbie	1982–
(United States) Bill Loeffler	1956–
(United States) Bob Lohr	1960–
(England) Jonathan Lomas	1968–
(Australia) Peter Lonard	1967–
(New Zealand) Michael Long	1968–
(United Kingdom) Henry Longhurst HoF	1909–1978
(Scotland) Bill Longmuir	1953–
(France) Michael Lorenzo-Vera	1985–
(United States) Lyn Lott	1950–
(United States) Dick Lotz	1942–
(United States) Andrew Loupe	1988–
(United States) Tim Loustalot	1965–
(United States) Davis Love III HoF	1964–
(United States) Jamie Lovemark	1988–
(United States) George Low Jr.	1912–1995
(Scotland) George Low Sr.	1874–1950
(United States) Eddie Lowery	1903–1984
(United States) Steve Lowery	1960–
(Republic of Ireland) Shane Lowry	1987–
(Taiwan) Lu Chien-soon	1959–
(Taiwan) Lu Hsi-chuen	1953–
(Taiwan) Lu Liang-Huan	1936–2022
(Taiwan) Lu Wei-chih	1979–
(Taiwan) Lu Wen-teh	1963–
(England) Laddie Lucas	1916–1998
(France) Jean-François Lucquin	1978–
(Netherlands) Joost Luiten	1986–
(Spain) Santiago Luna	1962–
(United States) Bill Lunde	1975–
(Sweden) Mikael Lundberg	1973–
(United States) Bob Lunn	1945–
(India) Amit Luthra	1960–
(United States) Mark Lye	1952–
(Australia) Jarrod Lyle	1981–2018
(Scotland) Sandy Lyle HoF	1958–
(England) David Lynn	1973–
(Canada) George Lyon	1858–1938

^ Lee is his family name.
* Lin is his family name.

== M ==
(Scotland) Robert MacAndrew	1869–1951
(United States) Charles B. Macdonald HoF	1855–1939
(Scotland) Willie Macfarlane	1889–1961
(Scotland) Allan Macfie	1854–1943
(Australia) Roger Mackay	1956–2002
(England) Alister MacKenzie HoF	1870–1934
(England) Malcolm MacKenzie	1961–
(United States) Will MacKenzie	1974–
(Australia) Bryden Macpherson	1990–
(Denmark) Morten Ørum Madsen	1988–
(Japan) Shinsaku Maeda	1952–
(United States) Andrew Magee	1962–
(United States) Jeff Maggert	1964–
(United States) John Maginnes	1968–
(United States) Jack Maguire	1994–
(United States) John Mahaffey	1948–
(United States) Hunter Mahan	1982–
(Scotland) James Maiden	1881–1958
(Japan) Kiyoshi Maita	1959–
(United States) Ted Makalena	1934–1968
(Japan) Hiroshi Makino	1956–
(United States) John Mallinger	1979–
(United States) Bill Mallon	1952–
(United States) Peter Malnati	1987–
(United States) Roger Maltbie	1951–
(Singapore) Mardan Mamat	1967–
(Italy) Matteo Manassero	1993–
(United States) Tony Manero	1905–1989
(United States) Lloyd Mangrum HoF	1914–1973
(United States) Ray Mangrum	1910–1975
(Wales) Stuart Manley	1979–
(United States) Bob Mann	1951–
(Italy) Massimo Mannelli	1956–
(United States) Steve Marino	1980–
(United States) Dave Marr	1933–1997
(England) David Marsh	1934–2022
(Australia) Graham Marsh	1944–
(England) Andrew Marshall	1973–
(United States) Max Marston	1892–1949
(United States) Fred Marti	1940–
(United States) Ben Martin	1987–
(Scotland) Bob Martin	1853–1917
(United States) Casey Martin	1972–
(United States) Doug Martin	1966–
(Republic of Ireland) Jimmy Martin	1924–2000
(Spain) Miguel Ángel Martín	1962–
(Spain) Pablo Martín	1986–
(Paraguay) Pedro Martínez	1963–
(United States) Billy Martindale	1938–2026
(Japan) Daisuke Maruyama	1971–
(Japan) Shigeki Maruyama	1969–
(Japan) Tomohiro Maruyama	1958–
(South Africa) John Mashego	1951–
(England) Ben Mason	1977–
(England) Carl Mason	1953–
(United States) James Mason	1951–
(United States) Don Massengale	1937–2007
(United States) Rik Massengale	1947–
(France) Arnaud Massy	1877–1950
(United States) Dick Mast	1951–
(Japan) Mitsuhiko Masuda	1937–
(Japan) Nobuhiro Masuda	1973–
(United States) David Mathis	1974–
(Japan) Hajime Matsui	1954–
(Japan) Michio Matsumura	1983–
(Japan) Hideki Matsuyama	1992–
(United States) Troy Matteson	1979–
(United States) Len Mattiace	1967–
(United States) Billy Maxwell	1929–2021
(United States) John Maxwell	1871–1906
(Scotland) Robert Maxwell	1876–1949
(United States) Bob May	1968–
(Northern Ireland) Gareth Maybin	1980–
(United States) Dick Mayer	1924–1989
(United States) Billy Mayfair	1966–
(United States) Shelley Mayfield	1924–2010
(Scotland) Stephen McAllister	1962–
(Scotland) Andrew McArthur	1979–
(United States) Rives McBee	1938–2023
(United States) Blaine McCallister	1958–
(United States) Bob McCallister	1934–2021
(United States) Scott McCarron	1965–
(United States) Denny McCarthy	1993–
(United States) Gary McCord	1948–
(United States) Mark McCormack HoF	1930–2003
(United States) Mike McCoy	1962–
(United States) Mike McCullough	1945–
(United States) Mark McCumber	1951–
(United States) John McDermott	1891–1971
(Republic of Ireland) (United States) Joe McDermott	1940–
(Northern Ireland) Graeme McDowell	1979–
(England) Peter McEvoy	1953–
(England) Richard McEvoy	1979–
(England) Ross McFarlane	1961–
(Republic of Ireland) Michael McGeady	1978–
(United States) Jerry McGee	1943–2021
(Republic of Ireland) Paul McGinley	1966–
(United States) Tom McGinnis	1947–2019
(United States) William McGirt	1979–
(United States) Jim McGovern	1965–
(United States) Jack McGowan	1930–2001
(United States) Pat McGowan	1954–
(England) Ross McGowan	1982–
(Republic of Ireland) Damien McGrane	1971–
(Scotland) Doug McGuigan	1970–
(Northern Ireland) Rory McIlroy	1989–
(South Africa) PH McIntyre	1986–
(Australia) Leigh McKechnie	1973–
(United States) Rob McKelvey	1969–
(Australia) David McKenzie	1967–
(United States) Burt McKinnie	1879–1946
(United States) Parker McLachlin	1979–
(South Africa) Andrew McLardy	1974–
(United States) George McLean	1893–1951
(Australia) James McLean	1978–
(England) Michael McLean	1963–
(Scotland) Jamie McLeary	1981–
(United States) Mac McLendon	1945–2022
(Scotland) (United States) Fred McLeod	1882–1976
(United States) John McMullin	1935–2021
(United States) Tom McNamara	1882–
(United States) George McNeill	1975–
(Zimbabwe) (Republic of Ireland) Mark McNulty	1953–
(Canada) Matt McQuillan	1981–
(United States) Spike McRoy	1968–
(United States) Jug McSpaden	1908–1996
(Australia) Peter McWhinney	1956–
(United States) Rocco Mediate	1962–
(Sweden) Adam Mednick	1966–
(United States) Bill Mehlhorn	1898–1989
(Germany) Nicolas Meitinger	1984–
(United States) Steve Melnyk	1947–
(United States) Al Mengert	1929–2021
(United States) Bob Menne	1942–2023
(United States) John Merrick	1982–
(United States) Troy Merritt	1985–
(Australia) Ross Metherell	1948–
(United States) Dick Metz	1908–1993
(Japan) Hajime Meshiai	1954–
(United States) Shaun Micheel	1969–
(United States) Phil Mickelson HoF	1970–
(United States) Cary Middlecoff HoF	1921–1998
(Spain) Ángel Miguel	1929–2009
(Spain) Sebastián Miguel	1931–2006
(Japan) Norio Mikami	1947–
(Australia) Matthew Millar	1976–
(United States) Allen Miller	1948–
(United States) Andy Miller	1978–
(Scotland) James Miller	18??–????
(United States) Johnny Miller HoF	1947–
(United States) Lindy Miller	1956–
(Scotland) Mike Miller	1951–
(United States) Spider Miller	1950–
(United States) Zack Miller	1984–
(Canada) Jon Mills	1978–
(Philippines) Frankie Miñoza	1959–
(England) Abe Mitchell	1887–1947
(United States) Bobby Mitchell	1943–2018
(United States) Jeff Mitchell	1954–
(England) Peter Mitchell	1958–
(Japan) Tatsuya Mitsuhashi	1973–
(Japan) Katsumasa Miyamoto	1972–
(Japan) Shozo Miyamoto	1940–
(Japan) Yasuhiro Miyamoto	1948–
(Japan) Hirofumi Miyase	1971–
(Japan) Kiyoshi Miyazato	1977–
(Japan) Yūsaku Miyazato	1980–
(United States) Larry Mize	1958–
(Japan) Eiji Mizoguchi	1964–
(Japan) Yoshi Mizumaki	1958–
(South Korea) Mo Joong-kyung	1971–
(England) Ralph Moffitt	1932–2003
(United States) Bryce Molder	1979–
(Argentina) Florentino Molina	1938–
(Argentina) Mauricio Molina	1966–2023
(Italy) Edoardo Molinari	1981–
(Italy) Francesco Molinari	1982–
(Argentina) César Monasterio	1963–
(Scotland) Colin Montgomerie HoF	1963–
(United States) Eric Monti	1917–2009
(England) Chris Moody	1953–
(United States) Orville Moody	1933–2008
(United States) Jonathan Moore	1985–
(United States) Nathaniel Moore	1884–1910
(United States) Patrick Moore	1970–
(United States) Ryan Moore	1982–
(United States) Tommy Moore	1962–1998
(South Africa) Titch Moore	1976–
(United States) Dale Morey	1918–2002
(United States) Gil Morgan	1946–
(England) John Morgan	1943–2006
(England) John E. Morgan	1977–
(United States) Walter Morgan	1941–
(Japan) Shigenori Mori	1958–
(Republic of Ireland) Colm Moriarty	1979–
(France) Adrien Mörk	1979–
(Canada) David Morland IV	1969–
(United States) Mike Morley	1946–
(Japan) Masatsugu Morofuji	1985–
(Scotland) Tom Morris, Jr. HoF	1851–1875
(Scotland) Tom Morris, Sr. HoF	1821–1908
(England) James Morrison	1985–
(United States) Andy Morse	1958–
(United States) John Morse	1958–
(Australia) Jarrod Moseley	1972–
(England) Ian Mosey	1951–
(United States) Perry Moss	1969–
(England) Jamie Moul	1984–
(Wales) Mark Mouland	1961–
(United States) Larry Mowry	1936–
(United States) Jodie Mudd	1960–
(England) Jimmy Mullen	1993–
(South Africa) Grant Muller	1970–
(South Africa) Garth Mulroy	1978–
(India) Chinnaswamy Muniyappa	1977–
(Netherlands) Rolf Muntz	1969–
(Philippines) (Japan) Artemio Murakami	1983–
(Japan) Takashi Murakami	1944–
(United States) Bill Murchison	1956–
(Australia) Antonio Murdaca	1995–
(Japan) Kiyoshi Murota	1955–
(United States) Bob Murphy	1943–
(Republic of Ireland) Gary Murphy	1972–
(United States) Sean Murphy	1965–
(Australia) Alan Murray	1940–
(England) Andrew Murray	1956–
(Scotland) George Murray	1983–
(United States) Grayson Murray	1993–2024
(Australia) Zach Murray	1997–
(Zambia) Madalitso Muthiya	1983–
(Japan) Toshinori Muto	1978–

== N ==
(United States) Kevin Na	1983–
(Australia) Kel Nagle HoF	1920–2015
(Japan) Tsuneyuki Nakajima	1954–
(Japan) Tadao Nakamura	1947–
(Japan) Teruo Nakamura	1952–
(Japan) Torakichi Nakamura	1915–2008
(Japan) Tōru Nakamura	1950–
(United States) Chris Nallen	1982–
(South Africa) Lindani Ndwandwe	1975–
(Scotland) Bradley Neil	1996–
(Canada) Jim Nelford	1955–
(United States) Byron Nelson HoF	1912–2006
(United States) Larry Nelson HoF	1947–
(United States) Matthew NeSmith	1993–
(United States) Dwight Nevil	1944–
(United States) Francis Newton	1874–1946
(Australia) Jack Newton	1950–2022
(England) Gilbert Nicholls	1878–1950
(United States) Bobby Nichols	1936–
(England) Mark Nichols	1965–
(United States) Gary Nicklaus	1969–
(United States) Jack Nicklaus HoF	1940–
(United States) Mike Nicolette	1956–
(United States) Jordan Niebrugge	1993–
(United States) Lonnie Nielsen	1953–2021
(United States) Tom Nieporte	1928–2014
(Japan) Yoshimi Niizeki	1954–
(Sweden) Christian Nilsson	1979–
(Japan) Tetsu Nishikawa	1968–
(Australia) James Nitties	1982–
(England) Matthew Nixon	1989–
(New Zealand) Frank Nobilo	1960–
(Japan) Takao Nogami	1971–
(South Korea) Noh Seung-yul	1991–
(Republic of Ireland) Keith Nolan	1973–
(Japan) Shigeru Nonaka	1970–
(Sweden) Alex Norén	1982–
(Sweden) Henrik Norlander	1987–
(Australia) Greg Norman HoF	1955–
(Canada) Moe Norman	1929–2004
(United States) Gerry Norquist	1962–
(Denmark) Thomas Nørret	1974–
(South Africa) Shaun Norris	1982–
(United States) Tim Norris	1957–
(United States) Andy North	1950–
(Sweden) Per Nyman	1968–
(Sweden) Henrik Nyström	1969–

== O ==
(United States) David Oakley	1945–2006
(United States) Pete Oakley	1949–
(United States) Arron Oberholser	1975–
(England) James Ockenden	1885–1949
(Republic of Ireland) Christy O'Connor Jnr	1948–2016
(Republic of Ireland) Christy O'Connor Snr HoF	1924–2016
(Argentina) Matías O'Curry	1982–
(Japan) Koumei Oda	1978–
(Japan) Ryuichi Oda	1976–
(Japan) Toshiaki Odate	1968–
(United States) Joe Ogilvie	1974–
(Australia) Geoff Ogilvy	1977–
(Australia) Brett Ogle	1964–
(United States) Mac O'Grady	1951–
(United States) David Ogrin	1957–
(United States) David Oh	1981–
(United States) James Oh	1982–
(United States) Sean O'Hair	1982–
(Scotland) Steven O'Hara	1980–
(Australia) Nick O'Hern	1971–
(Sweden) Fredrik Ohlsson	1979–
(Japan) Akiyoshi Ohmachi	1958–
(Japan) Seiki Okuda	1960–
(Sweden) Mårten Olander	1971–
(Spain) José María Olazábal HoF	1966–
(Scotland) Andrew Oldcorn	1960–
(Republic of Ireland) John O'Leary	1949–2020
(Denmark) Thorbjørn Olesen	1989–
(United States) Ed Oliver	1916–1961
(United States) George Oliver	1883–1965
(United States) Leif Olson	1981–
(Australia) Peter O'Malley	1965–
(United States) Mark O'Meara HoF	1957–
(United States) Timothy O'Neal	1972–
(Japan) Koichi Ono	1919–2000
(Thailand) Sukree Onsham	1944–
(England) Peter Oosterhuis	1948–2024
(South Africa) Andries Oosthuizen	c. 1954–
(South Africa) Louis Oosthuizen	1982–
(United States) Rob Oppenheim	1980–
(United States) Steve Oppermann	1942–
(Australia) Wade Ormsby	1980–
(Scotland) Gary Orr	1967–
(England) Max Orrin	1994–
(Mexico) Carlos Ortiz	1991–
(Japan) Mamo Osanai	1970–
(Republic of Ireland) Denis O'Sullivan	1948–
(United States) Brad Ott	1969–
(South Africa) Hennie Otto	1976–
(United States) Francis Ouimet HoF	1893–1967
(United States) Jeff Overton	1983–
(England) Greg Owen	1972–
(New Zealand) Simon Owen	1950–
(United States) Charles Owens	1932–2017
(Japan) Masashi Ozaki HoF	1947–2025
(Japan) Naomichi Ozaki	1956–
(Japan) Tateo Ozaki	1954–

== P ==
(New Zealand) Gareth Paddison	1980–
(England) Alf Padgham	1906–1966
(Philippines) Juvic Pagunsan	1978–
(Australia) Anthony Painter	1965–
(England) Chris Paisley	1986–
(United States) Arnold Palmer HoF	1929–2016
(South Africa) Ian Palmer	1957–
(England) Jason Palmer	1984–
(United States) Johnny Palmer	1918–2006
(United States) Ryan Palmer	1976–
(Australia) Rod Pampling	1969–
(Canada) Bob Panasik	1941–
(Scotland) John Panton	1916–2009
(United States) Brinson Paolini	1991–
(Australia) Dimitrios Papadatos	1982–
(South Africa) Brenden Pappas	1970–
(South Africa) Deane Pappas	1967–
(South Africa) Sean Pappas	1966–2015
(Italy) Renato Paratore	1996–
(United States) Scott Parel	1965–
(Wales) David Park	1974–
(South Korea) Park Jae-bum	1982–
(South Korea) Jin Park	1979–
(Scotland) Mungo Park	1835–1904
(South Korea) Park Sung-joon	1986–
(Scotland) Willie Park Jr. HoF	1864–1925
(Scotland) Willie Park Sr. HoF	1833–1903
(Wales) Philip Parkin	1961–
(United States) Sam Parks Jr.	1909–1997
(Sweden) Jesper Parnevik	1965–
(Australia) Craig Parry	1966–
(England) John Parry	1986–
(Australia) Geoff Parslow	1947–
(Australia) Lucas Parsons	1969–
(United States) Alan Pate	1953–
(United States) Jerry Pate	1953–
(United States) Steve Pate	1961–
(United States) Billy Joe Patton	1922–2011
(United States) Chris Patton	1967–
(Nigeria) (United States) Eliezer Paul-Gindiri	20??
(United States) Carl Paulson	1970–
(United States) Dennis Paulson	1962–
(Italy) Andrea Pavan	1989–
(United States) Corey Pavin	1959–
(England) Jim Payne	1970–
(United States) Eddie Pearce	1952–
(New Zealand) Mahal Pearce	1977–
(United States) Rick Pearson	1958–
(United States) Calvin Peete	1943–2015
(United States) Christian Peña	1968–
(United States) Harvey Penick HoF	1904–1995
(Italy) (United States) Toney Penna	1908–1995
(United States) David Peoples	1960–
(England) Eddie Pepperell	1991–
(Australia) Cameron Percy	1974–
(Sri Lanka) Mithun Perera	1986–
(Sri Lanka) Nandasena Perera	1954–2019
(United States) Pat Perez	1976–
(England) Philip Perkins	1904–1978
(New Zealand) Craig Perks	1967–
(United States) Tom Pernice Jr.	1959–
(England) Alf Perry	1904–1974
(United States) Chris Perry	1981–
(United States) Kenny Perry	1960–
(Australia) Wayne Perske	1974–
(United States) Peter Persons	1962–
(United States) John Peterson	1989–
(United States) Matt Peterson	1967–
(United States) Scott Petersen	1970–
(United States) Tim Petrovic	1966–
(Sweden) Carl Pettersson	1977–
(United States) Mark Pfeil	1951–
(Republic of Ireland) Kevin Phelan	1990–
(United States) Mason Phelps	1885–1945
(Australia) Frank Phillips	19??–
(England) Van Phillips	1972–
(United States) Henry Picard HoF	1907–1997
(Australia) Ossie Pickworth	1918–1969
(United States) Scott Piercy	1978–
(South Africa) Brandon Pieters	1976–
(Belgium) Thomas Pieters	1992–
(Australia) Terry Pilkadaris	1973–
(Wales) Mark Pilkington	1978–
(United States) Martin Piller	1985–
(United States) Scott Pinckney	1989–
(Spain) Manuel Piñero	1952–
(United States) Jerry Pittman	1936–
(England) Lionel Platts	1934–
(South Africa) Gary Player HoF	1935–
(United States) Dan Pohl	1955–
(United States) D. A. Points	1976–
(Northern Ireland) Eddie Polland	1947–
(Ecuador) Rafael Ponce	1963–
(United States) Don Pooley	1951–
(United States) Andy Pope	1984–
(Australia) Daniel Popovic	1986–
(England) Garrick Porteous	1990–
(South Africa) Haydn Porteous	1994–
(United States) Bill Porter	1959–
(Australia) Ewan Porter	1982–
(Argentina) Martin Pose	1911–1997
(United States) Johnny Pott	1935–
(United States) Henry Potter	1881–1955
(United States) Ted Potter Jr.	1983–
(England) Ian Poulter	1976–
(United States) Jimmy Powell	1935–2021
(United States) Greg Powers	1946–2026
(Australia) Kieran Pratt	1988–
(Thailand) Prayad Marksaeng *	1966–
(Scotland) Jimmy Prentice	1885–1915
(Australia) Alistair Presnell	1979–
(Australia) Aron Price	1982–
(Zimbabwe) Nick Price HoF	1957–
(Wales) Phillip Price	1966–
(United States) Rick Price	1968–
(United States) Simeon Price	1882–1945
(Australia) Terry Price	1960–
(United States) Dicky Pride	1969–
(Thailand) Prom Meesawat *	1984–
(United States) Alex Prugh	1984–
(United States) Dillard Pruitt	1961–
(United States) Ted Purdy	1973–
(United States) Tom Purtzer	1951–
(United States) Andrew Putnam	1989–
(United States) Michael Putnam	1983–
(England) Iain Pyman	1973–

*Thai, so sorted by first name.

== Q ==
(Philippines) Angelo Que	1978–
(France) Julien Quesne	1980–
(United States) Smiley Quick	1909–1979
(United States) Brett Quigley	1969–
(United States) Dana Quigley	1947–
(United States) Fran Quinn	1965–
(United States) Jeff Quinney	1978–
(Spain) Álvaro Quirós	1983–
(Spain) Juan Quirós	1956–

== R ==
(United States) Sammy Rachels	1950–
(Northern Ireland) Ronan Rafferty	1964–
(United States) Dave Ragan	1935–2018
(United States) John Rahm	1854–1935
(Spain) Jon Rahm	1994–
(Bangladesh) Siddikur Rahman	1984–
(India) Himmat Rai	1987–
(England) Glenn Ralph	1956–
(Scotland) Eric Ramsay	1979–
(Scotland) Richie Ramsay	1983–
(India) Jyoti Randhawa	1972–
(United States) Sam Randolph	1964–
(United States) Henry Ransom	1911–1987
(Australia) Noel Ratcliffe	1945–2024
(United States) Charles Raulerson	1964–
(England) Horace Rawlins	1874–1935
(Jersey) Ted Ray	1877–1943
(Italy) Michele Reale	1971–
(United States) Chez Reavie	1981–
(United States) Patrick Reed	1990–
(Wales) Dai Rees	1913–1983
(United States) Don Reese	1953–
(United States) Dean Refram	1936–1991
(Mexico) Victor Regalado	1948–
(United States) Mike Reid	1954–
(United States) Steve Reid	1936–
(England) (United States) Wilfrid Reid	1884–1973
(United States) Kyle Reifers	1983–
(Belgium) Pierre Relecom	1985–
(France) Jean-François Remésy	1964–
(Netherlands) Taco Remkes	1984–
(United States) Jack Renner	1956–
(United States) Jim Renner	1983–
(United States) Johnny Revolta	1911–1991
(United States) Rick Rhoden	1953–
(England) Jim Rhodes	1946–2015
(United States) Ted Rhodes	1913–1969
(England) Matthew Richardson	1984–
(England) Steven Richardson	1966–
(United States) Tag Ridings	1974–
(United States) Fred Ridley	1952–
(United States) Skee Riegel	1914–2009
(United States) John Riegger	1963–
(United States) Chris Riley	1973–
(Australia) Wayne Riley	1962–
(United States) Larry Rinker	1957–
(United States) Lee Rinker	1960–
(France) Victor Riu	1985–
(Spain) José Rivero	1955–
(Malaysia) Airil Rizman	1978–
(United States) Wes Roach	1988–
(Scotland) James Robb	1878–1949
(United States) Clifford Roberts HoF	1894–1977
(United States) Loren Roberts	1955–
(Scotland) Allan Robertson HoF	1815–1859
(Scotland) David Robertson	1869–1937
(Scotland) Dean Robertson	1970–
(England) Jeremy Robinson	1966–
(England) Simon Robinson	1981–
(Italy) Costantino Rocca	1956–
(Brazil) Alexandre Rocha	1977–
(England) Robert Rock	1977–
(England) Chris Rodgers	1976–
(United States) Patrick Rodgers	1992–
(United States) Phil Rodgers	1938–2018
(Spain) Carlos Rodiles	1975–
(Puerto Rico) Chi-Chi Rodríguez HoF	1935–
(Argentina) Miguel Rodríguez	1973–
(England) Mark Roe	1963–
(Netherlands) Martin Roesink	1939–
(South Africa) Ashley Roestoff	1963–
(United States) Bill Rogers	1951–
(Argentina) Gustavo Rojas	1967–
(United States) John Rollins	1975–
(Argentina) Andrés Romero	1981–
(Argentina) Eduardo Romero	1954–2022
(South Africa) Jake Roos	1980–
(United States) Bob Rosburg	1926–2009
(United States) Clarence Rose	1957–
(England) Justin Rose	1980–
(Scotland) Alec Ross	1879–1952
(Scotland) (United States) Donald Ross HoF	1872–1948
(South Africa) Lyle Rowe	1987–
(Canada) Doug Roxburgh	1951–
(United States) Hugh Royer III	1964–
(United States) Hugh Royer Jr.	1936–2014
(United States) Mason Rudolph	1934–2011
(Argentina) Leopoldo Ruiz	1925–
(Paraguay) Marco Ruiz	1974–
(United States) Jack Rule, Jr.	1938–
(Australia) Brett Rumford	1977–
(United States) Dave Rummells	1958–
(United States) Steve Runge	1968–
(United States) Paul Runyan HoF	1908–2002
(England) David A. Russell	1957–
(England) David J. Russell	1954–
(Scotland) Raymond Russell	1972–
(France) Charles-Édouard Russo	1980–
(England) James Ruth	1985–
(Scotland) Walter Rutherford	1870–1936
(Canada) Jim Rutledge	1959–
(England) George Ryall	1958–
(Australia) Mick Ryan	1897–1965
(United States) Charlie Rymer	1967–
(South Korea) Ryu Hyun-woo	1981–

== S ==
(Argentina) Armando Saavedra	1954–
(South Africa) Rory Sabbatini	1976–
(Scotland) Sandy Saddler	c.1936–
(Scotland) Elliot Saltman	1982–
(Scotland) Lloyd Saltman	1985–
(Spain) Álvaro Salto	1974–
(United States) Bryan Saltus	1971–
(Finland) Kalle Samooja	1988–
(Sweden) Jarmo Sandelin	1967–
(United States) Doug Sanders	1933–2020
(United States) Charles Sands	1865–1945
(Portugal) Ricardo Santos	1982–
(Mexico) Cesar Sanudo	1943–2011
(United States) Gene Sarazen HoF	1902–1999
(England) George Sargent	1882–1962
(Japan) Hisayuki Sasaki	1964–2013
(Japan) Nobuhito Sato	1970–
(Japan) Shoichi Sato	1947–
(United States) Gene Sauers	1962–
(United States) Sam Saunders	1987–
(United States) Daniel Sawyer	1884–1937
(Netherlands) Reinier Saxton	1988–
(Scotland) Ben Sayers	1856–1924
(Italy) Massimo Scarpa	1970–
(United States) Xander Schauffele	1993–
(United States) Scottie Scheffler	1996–
(United States) Monte Scheinblum	1967–
(United States) Tom Scherrer	1970–
(United States) John Schlee	1939–2000
(Scotland) Ken Schofield HoF	1946–
(United States) Dave Schreyer	1966–
(United States) John Schroeder	1945–
(United States) Mike Schuchart	1962–
(United States) Jason Schultz	1973–
(United States) Ted Schulz	1959–
(South Africa) Charl Schwartzel	1984–
(England) Zane Scotland	1982–
(Australia) Adam Scott	1980–
(Australia) Craig Scott	1983–
(England) Michael Scott	1878–1959
(England) Osmund Scott	1876–1948
(Canada) Richard Scott	1983–
(United States) Donald Sechrest	1933–2006
(United States) Chase Seiffert	1991–
(Sweden) Ove Sellberg	1959–
(United States) Frederick Semple	1872–1927
(Australia) John Senden	1971–
(England) Jack Senior	1988–
(Australia) Peter Senior	1959–
(United States) Felix Serafin	1905–1966
(Australia) George Serhan	1954–
(Japan) Nobuo Serizawa	1959–
(India) P. G. Sethi	19??–c.1981
(South Africa) Sewsunker Sewgolum	1930–1978
(Scotland) Ronnie Shade	1938–1986
(Australia) Bill Shankland	1907–1998
(New Zealand) Andrew Shaw	1898–1983
(Australia) Bob Shaw	1944–
(United States) Tom Shaw	1938–
(Australia) Bob Shearer	1948–2022
(United States) Patrick Sheehan	1969–
(Australia) Paul Sheehan	1977–
(England) Andrew Sherborne	1961–
(Scotland) Gordon Sherry	1974–
(Japan) Hideto Shigenobu	1954–
(Japan) Kosaku Shimada	1944–
(Japan) Masashi Shimada	1971–
(Japan) Norio Shinozaki	1969–
(United States) John Shippen	1879–1968
(Japan) Ikuo Shirahama	1958–
(Japan) Hidezumi Shirakata	1966–
(United States) Wes Short Jr.	1963–
(United States) Denny Shute HoF	1904–1974
(United States) Dick Siderowf	1937–
(United States) Tom Sieckmann	1955–
(Germany) Marcel Siem	1980–
(United States) Charlie Sifford HoF	1922–2015
(United States) Jay Sigel	1943–2025
(United States) Dan Sikes	1929–1987
(United States) R. H. Sikes	1940–2023
(United States) Tony Sills	1955–
(Portugal) Daniel Silva	1966–
(United States) Larry Silveira	1965–
(United States) Mark Silvers	1986–
(Australia) Michael Sim	1984–
(United States) Jim Simons	1950–2005
(Scotland) Jack Simpson	1859–1895
(United States) Scott Simpson	1955–
(United States) Tim Simpson	1956–
(United States) Webb Simpson	1985–
(United States) Joey Sindelar	1958–
(India) Digvijay Singh	1972–
(India) Jeev Milkha Singh	1971–
(India) Sujjan Singh	1980–
(Fiji) Vijay Singh HoF	1963–
(United States) Geoffrey Sisk	1965–
(Sweden) Joel Sjöholm	1985–
(Sweden) Patrik Sjöland	1971–
(Republic of Ireland) Paddy Skerritt	1926–2001
(United States) Sonny Skinner	1960–
(England) Lee Slattery	1978–
(Canada) Roger Sloan	1987–
(United States) Heath Slocum	1974–
(Netherlands) Tim Sluiter	1989–
(United States) Jeff Sluman	1957–
(New Zealand) David Smail	1970–
(United States) Mike Small	1966–
(United States) Ricky Smallridge	c.1958–
(Scotland) Alex Smith	1874–1930
(Canada) Andrew Smith	1849–1901
(United States) Byron Smith	1981–
(Australia) Cameron Smith	1993–
(United States) Chris Smith	1969–
(United States) Horton Smith HoF	1908–1963
(United States) Jerry Smith	1964–
(Scotland) (United States) Macdonald Smith	1890–1949
(United States) Nate Smith	1983–
(United States) Nathan Smith	1978–
(United States) Taylor Smith	1967–2007
(United States) Warren Smith	1915–2015
(Scotland) Willie Smith	1876–1916
(United States) Clement Smoot	1884–1963
(Republic of Ireland) Des Smyth	1953–
(United States) J. C. Snead	1940–
(United States) Sam Snead HoF	1912–2002
(United States) Brandt Snedeker	1980–
(United States) Ed Sneed	1944–
(England) David Snell	1933–2021
(France) Anthony Snobeck	1983–
(United States) Joey Snyder III	1973–
(United States) Karsten Solheim HoF	1911–2000
(Australia) Vaughan Somers	1951–
(Canada) Ross Somerville	1903–1991
(Japan) Yasuo Sone	1950–
(Japan) Shunsuke Sonoda	1989–
(France) Clément Sordet	1992–
(Denmark) Anders Sørensen	1962–
(Spain) Ramón Sota	1938–2012
(Argentina) Jorge Soto	1945–2011
(United States) Frank Souchak	1915–2006
(United States) Mike Souchak	1927–2008
(Argentina) Adan Sowa	1954–
(United States) Bob Sowards	1968–
(South Africa) Theunis Spangenberg	1983–
(Australia) Craig Spence	1974–
(England) Jamie Spence	1963–
(United States) Jordan Spieth	1993–
(United States) Bill Spiller	1913–1988
(Canada) Rod Spittle	1955–
(United States) Mike Sposa	1969–
(United States) Steve Spray	1940–2020
(United States) Mike Springer	1965–
(United States) Craig Stadler	1953–
(United States) Kevin Stadler	1980–
(France) Gary Stal	1992–
(United States) Scott Stallings	1985–
(United States) Mike Standly	1964–
(United States) Paul Stankowski	1969–
(Australia) Ian Stanley	1948–2018
(United States) Kyle Stanley	1987–
(United States) Joe Stansberry	1956–
(United States) Chris Starkjohann	1956–
(Malaysia) Iain Steel	1971–
(United States) Brendan Steele	1983–
(United States) Jerry Steelsmith	1935–2024
(United States) Shawn Stefani	1981–
(Sweden) Henrik Stenson	1976–
(Australia) Lyndsay Stephen	1956–2021
(United States) Scott Sterling	1972–
(South Africa) Richard Sterne	1981–
(United States) Earl Stewart	1921–1990
(United States) Payne Stewart HoF	1957–1999
(Australia) Tim Stewart	1985–
(United States) Stuart Stickney	1877–1932
(United States) William Stickney	1879–1932
(Australia) Matt Stieger	1991–
(United States) Darron Stiles	1973–
(United States) Ken Still	1935–2017
(United States) Dave Stockton	1941–
(United States) Dave Stockton Jr.	1968–
(United States) Jerry Stolhand	1935–1989
(Australia) Andre Stolz	1970–
(Denmark) Knud Storgaard	1972–
(England) Graeme Storm	1978–
(United States) Frank Strafaci	1916–1988
(United States) Frank Stranahan	1922–2013
(United States) Curtis Strange HoF	1955–
(Australia) Scott Strange	1977–
(Scotland) Andrew Strath	1837–1868
(United States) Robert Streb	1987–
(United States) Ron Streck	1954–
(United States) Kevin Streelman	1978–
(United States) Steve Stricker	1967–
(United States) Will Strickler	1986–
(England) Herbert Strong	1880–1944
(United States) Chris Stroud	1982–
(Germany) Sven Strüver	1967–
(United States) Brian Stuard	1982–
(United States) Zack Sucher	1986–
(Japan) Noboru Sugai	1949–
(Japan) Teruo Sugihara	1937–
(Japan) Toshikazu Sugihara	1964–
(Japan) Hideyo Sugimoto	1938–
(South Korea) Suk Jong-yul *	1968–
(England) Andy Sullivan	1987–
(Wales) Kyron Sullivan	1976–
(United States) Mike Sullivan	1955–
(United States) Ryan Sullivan	1989–
(United States) Bruce Summerhays	1944–
(United States) Daniel Summerhays	1983–
(Spain) Carl Suneson	1967–
(England) Steve Surry	1982–
(United States) David Sutherland	1966–
(United States) Kevin Sutherland	1964–
(United States) Brad Sutterfield	1969–
(United States) Hal Sutton	1958–
(Japan) Koichi Suzuki	1956–
(Japan) Norio Suzuki	1951–
(Japan) Toru Suzuki	1966–
(Japan) Yutaka Suzuki	1946–
(United States) Andrew Svoboda	1979–
(United States) Hudson Swafford	1987–
(South Africa) Chris Swanepoel	1984–
(United States) Jess Sweetser	1902–1989
(Canada) Warren Sye	1956–

== T ==
(Italy) Alessandro Tadini	1973–
(Scotland) Frederick Guthrie Tait	1870–1900
(Scotland) John Guthrie Tait	1861–1945
(Japan) Soushi Tajima	1976–
(Japan) Katsunari Takahashi	1950–
(Japan) Mamoru Takahashi	1956–
(Japan) Tatsuhiko Takahashi	1956–
(Japan) Kazuhiro Takami	1959–
(Japan) Namio Takasu	1943–
(Japan) Tadahiro Takayama	1978–
(Japan) Yoshitaka Takeya	1980–
(United States) Roger Tambellini	1975–
(Australia) Andrew Tampion	1984–
(Japan) Hidemichi Tanaka	1971–
(Japan) Takuya Taniguchi	1956–
(Japan) Toru Taniguchi	1968–
(Japan) Hideto Tanihara	1978–
(Australia) Mark Tapper	c. 1950–
(New Zealand) Phil Tataurangi	1971–
(United States) Sandy Tatum	1920–2017
(United States) Frederick Winslow Taylor	1856–1915
(England) John Henry Taylor HoF	1871–1963
(Canada) Nick Taylor	1988–
(United States) Vaughn Taylor	1976–
(United States) Josh Teater	1979–
(France) Louis Tellier	1886–1921
(United States) Lance Ten Broeck	1956–
(United States) Brian Tennyson	1962–
(United States) Peter Teravainen	1956–
(South Africa) Des Terblanche	1965–
(United States) Ralph Terry	1936–2022
(Japan) Taichi Teshima	1968–
(United States) Doug Tewell	1949–
(Thailand) Thammanoon Sriroj *	1969–
(Thailand) Thanyakon Khrongpha *	1990–
(United States) Roland Thatcher	1977–
(Thailand) Thaworn Wiratchant *	1966–
(United States) Tim Thelen	1961–
(Wales) Dave Thomas	1934–2013
(United States) Justin Thomas	1993–
(United States) Dicky Thompson	1957–
(United States) Kyle Thompson	1979–
(United States) Leonard Thompson	1947–
(United States) Michael Thompson	1985–
(United States) Nicholas Thompson	1982–
(United States) Rocky Thompson	1939–2021
(Canada) Stanley Thompson	1894–1953
(Scotland) (United States) Jimmy Thomson	1908–1985
(Australia) Peter Thomson HoF	1929–2018
(Thailand) Thongchai Jaidee *	1969–
(Republic of Ireland) Simon Thornton	1977–
(Norway) Marius Thorp	1988–
(United States) Jim Thorpe	1949–
(United States) Chris Tidland	1972–
(England) Steven Tiley	1982–
(United States) A. W. Tillinghast HoF	1874–1942
(Denmark) Steen Tinning	1962–
(United States) Brendon Todd	1985–
(United States) Harry Todd	1916–1966
(Canada) Rick Todd	1962–
(Mexico) Esteban Toledo	1962–
(United States) Tommy Tolles	1966–
(England) Cyril Tolley	1895–1978
(United States) Peter Tomasulo	1981–
(Japan) Masaya Tomida	1977–
(Japan) Katsuyoshi Tomori	1954–
(United States) David Toms	1967–
(Australia) Peter Toogood	1930–2019
(Scotland) Sam Torrance	1953–
(Scotland) William Breck Torrance	1888–1956
(United States) Felice Torza	1920–1983
(United States) Bob Toski	1926–
(Belgium) Philippe Toussaint	1949–
(Australia) Aaron Townsend	1981–
(United States) Jay Townsend	1962–
(England) Peter Townsend	1946–
(United States) D. J. Trahan	1980–
(Austria) Manuel Trappel	1989–
(United States) Jerome Travers HoF	1887–1951
(Australia) (United States) Walter Travis HoF	1862–1927
(United States) Lee Trevino HoF	1939–
(United States) Cameron Tringale	1987–
(United States) Kirk Triplett	1962–
(United States) Ted Tryba	1967–
(United States) Ty Tryon	1984–
(Taiwan) Tsai Chi-huang	1968–
(South Africa) Vincent Tshabalala	1942–2017
(Japan) Yoshinobu Tsukada	1969–
(United States) Richard Tufts HoF	1896–1980
(Philippines) Celestino Tugot	1910–2010
(Chile) Mark Tullo	1978–
(Australia) Bob Tuohy	1940–
(Sweden) Sven Tumba	1931–2011
(England) Miles Tunnicliff	1968–
(New Zealand) Greg Turner	1963–
(United States) Jerod Turner	1975–
(United States) Jim Turnesa	1912–1971
(United States) Joe Turnesa	1901–1991
(United States) Marc Turnesa	1978–
(United States) Mike Turnesa	1907–2000
(United States) Willie Turnesa	1914–2001
(United States) Bob Tway	1959–
(United States) Kevin Tway	1988–
(United States) Greg Twiggs	1960–
(United States) Howard Twitty	1949–

*Thai, so sorted by first name.

== U ==
(Japan) Shigeru Uchida	1937–
(Thailand) Udorn Duangdecha	1970–
(Japan) Yui Ueda	1974–2026
(Japan) Koichi Uehara	1947–
(Japan) Tadami Ueno	1948–
(United States) Peter Uihlein	1989–
(United States) Wally Ulrich	1921–1995
(United States) Ed Updegraff	1922–
(Japan) Takemitsu Uranishi	1940–
(United States) Omar Uresti	1968–
(United States) Sam Urzetta	1926–2011
(United States) Stan Utley	1962–

== V ==
(United States) Tommy Valentine	1949–2014
(Argentina) Daniel Vancsik	1977–
(South Africa) Ulrich van den Berg	1975–
(Netherlands) Guido van der Valk	1980–
(South Africa) Dawie van der Walt	1983–
(South Africa) Tjaart van der Walt	1974–
(France) Jean van de Velde	1966–
(Belgium) Flory Van Donck	1912–1992
(Colombia) David Vanegas	1986–
(Belgium) Nicolas Vanhootegem	1972–
(United States) Bo Van Pelt	1975–
(South Africa) Nico van Rensburg	1966–
(South Africa) Danie van Tonder	1991–
(South Africa) Steve van Vuuren	1959–
(South Africa) Jaco van Zyl	1979–
(Jersey) Harry Vardon HoF	1870–1937
(United States) Harold Varner III	1990–
(South Africa) Bradford Vaughan	1975–
(United States) Bruce Vaughan	1956–
(Wales) David Vaughan	1948–
(United States) Vance Veazey	1965–
(Venezuela) Jhonattan Vegas	1984–
(Spain) Álvaro Velasco	1981–
(Colombia) Diego Velásquez	1987–
(United States) Ken Venturi HoF	1931–2013
(United States) Steve Veriato	1946–
(United States) Scott Verplank	1964–
(South Africa) Bobby Verwey	1941–
(Denmark) Mads Vibe-Hastrup	1978–
(Colombia) Camilo Villegas	1982–
(Colombia) Manuel Villegas	1984–
(United States) Ellsworth Vines	1911–1994
(Spain) Borja Virto	1991–
(Australia) Randall Vines	1945–
(New Zealand) Barry Vivian	1950–
(United States) George Von Elm	1901–1961
(Thailand) Arnond Vongvanij	1988–
(Australia) Norman Von Nida	1914–2007
(United States) Ernie Vossler	1928–2013
(United States) Brian Vranesh	1977–

== W ==
(United States) Bobby Wadkins	1951–
(United States) Lanny Wadkins HoF	1949–
(United States) Fred Wadsworth	1962–
(Argentina) Alan Wagner	1989–
(United States) Johnson Wagner	1980–
(New Zealand) Grant Waite	1964–
(England) Brian Waites	1940–2025
(England) Simon Wakefield	1974–
(Japan) Susumu Wakita	1947–
(United States) Rocky Walcher	1961–
(United States) Duffy Waldorf	1962–
(England) (United States) Cyril Walker	1892–1948
(United States) Jimmy Walker	1979–
(England) Sam Walker	1978–
(England) Anthony Wall	1975–
(United States) Art Wall Jr.	1923–2001
(United States) Frank Walsh	1902–1992
(Australia) Euan Walters	1970–
(South Africa) Justin Walters	1980–
(South Africa) Retief Waltman	c. 1938–
(Republic of Ireland) Philip Walton	1962–
(United States) Bobby Walzel	1949–
(United States) Fred Wampler	1923–1985
(Taiwan) Wang Ter-chang *	1962–
(United States) Bud Ward	1913–1968
(England) Charlie Ward	1911–2001
(United States) Harvie Ward	1925–2004
(United States) Tom Wargo	1942–
(England) Paul Waring	1985–
(United States) Charles Warren	1975–
(Australia) Craig Warren	1964–
(Scotland) Marc Warren	1981–
(Japan) Tsukasa Watanabe	1957–
(United States) Aaron Watkins	1982–
(United States) Nick Watney	1981–
(France) Romain Wattel	1991–
(United States) Al Watrous	1899–1983
(United States) Bubba Watson	1978–
(Zimbabwe) Denis Watson	1955–
(United States) Tom Watson HoF	1949–
(United States) Brian Watts	1966–
(England) Paul Way	1962–
(United States) Bert Weaver	1932–2022
(United States) DeWitt Weaver	1939–2021
(United States) Drew Weaver	1987–
(United States) Michael Weaver	1991–
(United States) Gary Webb	1961–
(Australia) Kane Webber	1980–
(United States) Harold Weber	1882–1933
(England) Steve Webster	1975–
(United States) Boo Weekley	1973–
(England) Harry Weetman	1920–1972
(United States) D. A. Weibring	1953–
(United States) Matt Weibring	1979–
(Canada) Mike Weir	1970–
(United States) Tom Weiskopf	1942–
(England) Paul Wesselingh	1961–
(South Africa) Terry Westbrook	1939–
(South Africa) Roger Wessels	1961–
(Sweden) Leif Westerberg	1974–
(United States) Jack Westland	1904–1982
(South Africa) Wayne Westner	1961–2017
(England) Lee Westwood	1973–
(England) Roger Wethered	1899–1983
(United States) Brett Wetterich	1973–
(United States) Ward Wettlaufer	1935–
(United States) Steve Wheatcroft	1978–
(England) David Whelan	1961–
(Scotland) H. J. Whigham	1869–1954
(England) Charles Whitcombe	1895–1981
(England) Ernest Whitcombe	1890–1971
(England) Reg Whitcombe	1898–1957
(United States) Buck White	1911–1982
(United States) Ed White	1913–1999
(Scotland) Jack White	1873–1949
(Scotland) Peter Whiteford	1980–
(England) Tom Whitehouse	1980–
(South Africa) Clinton Whitelaw	1970–
(United States) Don Whitt	1930–2013
(United States) Ron Whittaker	1971–
(United States) Jesse Whittenton	1934–2012
(Australia) Ivo Whitton	1893–1967
(South Korea) Charlie Wi	1972–
(Sweden) Fredrik Widmark	1975–
(United States) Mark Wiebe	1957–
(United States) Jim Wiechers	1944–2018
(Austria) Martin Wiegele	1978–
(Austria) Bernd Wiesberger	1985–
(United States) Terry Wilcox	c.1940–
(United States) Will Wilcox	1986–
(United States) Vic Wilk	1960–
(New Zealand) Tim Wilkinson	1978–
(England) Danny Willett	1987–
(England) (South Africa) Chris Williams	1959–
(United States) Henry Williams, Jr.	1917–2002
(United States) Lee Williams	1981–
(United States) Jay Williamson	1967–
(United States) Tyler Williamson	1972–
(United States) Oscar Willing	1889–1962
(United States) Garrett Willis	1973–
(United States) Chris Wilson	1984–
(United States) Dean Wilson	1969–
(United States) John Wilson	1959–
(United States) Mark Wilson	1974–
(England) Oliver Wilson	1980–
(Scotland) Stuart Wilson	1977–
(United States) Herbert Warren Wind HoF	1916–2005
(United States) Bo Wininger	1922–1967
(United States) Casey Wittenberg	1984–
(United States) Matthew Wolff	1999–
(England) Gary Wolstenholme	1960–
(England) Guy Wolstenholme	1931–1984
(England) Chris Wood	1987–
(United States) Craig Wood HoF	1902–1968
(United States) Dan Wood	1946–2020
(Scotland) Norman Wood	1947–2023
(United States) Warren Wood	1887–1926
(United States) Willie Wood	1960–
(United States) Gary Woodland	1984–
(Australia) Jeff Woodland	1957–
(United States) Tiger Woods	1975–
(Wales) Ian Woosnam HoF	1958–
(United States) Lew Worsham	1917–1990
(United States) Robert Wrenn	1959–
(United States) Jimmy Wright	1939–
(China) Wu Ashun	1985–
(United States) Mark Wurtz	1964–2020
(United States) Bob Wynn	1940–2005
(United States) Dudley Wysong	1939–1998

*Wang is his family name.

== X ==
None

== Y ==
(Japan) Akira Yabe	1946–
(Japan) Kenichi Yamada	1947–
(Japan) Yoshitaka Yamamoto	1951–
(United States) Bert Yancey	1938–1994
(South Korea) Gunn Yang	1993–
(South Korea) Yang Yong-eun *	1972–
(Japan) Azuma Yano	1977–
(Japan) Haruo Yasuda	1943–
(Scotland) Simon Yates	1970–
(Taiwan) Yeh Chang-ting	1968–
(Taiwan) Yeh Wei-tze	1973–
(Canada) Ryan Yip	1984–
(Japan) Kaname Yokoo	1972–
(Japan) Yoshikazu Yokoshima	1952–
(Japan) Shinichi Yokota	1972–
(Japan) Akihito Yokoyama	1961–
(Japan) Tsuyoshi Yoneyama	1965–
(Japan) Kinpachi Yoshimura	1952–
(United States) Kim Young	1955–
(Japan) Nobumitsu Yuhara	1957–

*Yang is his family name.

== Z ==
(United States) Bruce Zabriski	1957–
(United States) George Zahringer	1953–
(United States) Will Zalatoris	1996–
(Paraguay) Fabrizio Zanotti	1983–
(Argentina) Julio Zapata	1976–
(United States) Kermit Zarley	1941–
(Myanmar) Zaw Moe	1967–
(United States) Walt Zembriski	1935–
(China) Zhang Lian-wei *	1965–
(United States) Larry Ziegler	1939–
(United States) Michael Zinni	1948–2014
(Australia) Matthew Zions	1978–
(United States) Fuzzy Zoeller	1951–2025
(Canada) Richard Zokol	1958–
(United States) Karl Zoller	1963–
(United States) Zoran Zorkic	1966–
(Australia) Jordan Zunic	1991–

*Zhang is his family name.

== See also ==
- List of sportspeople
- Great Triumvirate
