= Golf at the 1904 Summer Olympics =

Golf at the Games of the III Olympiad
- Venue: Glen Echo Country Club
- Dates: September 17–24, 1904

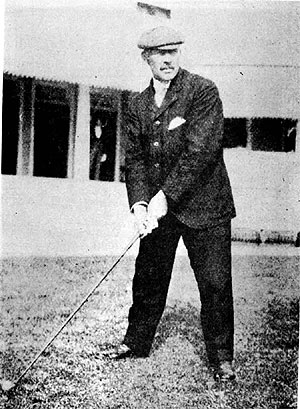
George Lyon, winner of the golf tournament at the 1904 Summer Olympics in St. Louis

At the 1904 Summer Olympics, two golf events were contested – men's individual and team tournaments. The competitions were held from September 17, 1904 to September 24, 1904. It was the second and final appearance of the sport at the Olympics until the 2016 Summer Olympics. The men's individual event was switched to a match play tournament rather than the stroke play used four years earlier.

== Format ==
There were two golf events at the 1904 Olympic Games. The first was a team championship open to golf associations, and contested over 36 holes of stroke play by teams of ten amateur golfers with all scores counting towards the team total. It was followed by an individual event contested as a match play knockout by the leading 32 players following a 36-hole stroke play qualifying round, with each match played over 36 holes.

== Medal summary ==
Event	Gold	Silver	Bronze
Individual	George Lyon; Canada	Chandler Egan; United States	Burt McKinnie; United States; Francis Newton; United States
Team	United States; Western Golf Association Edward Cummins; Kenneth Edwards; Chandler Egan; Walter Egan; Robert Hunter; Nathaniel Moore; Mason Phelps; Daniel Sawyer; Clement Smoot; Warren Wood	United States; Trans-Mississippi Golf Association John Cady; Albert Lambert; John Maxwell; Burt McKinnie; Ralph McKittrick; Francis Newton; Henry Potter; Frederick Semple; Stuart Stickney; William Stickney	United States; United States Golf Association (Note: The IOC medalist database lists an American team as winning the bronze medal. Like all other teams in the database, the team is not named beyond "United States of America III" (the gold and silver medal teams are I and II, respectively). Unlike the other two teams, however, there are no participants listed in the bronze-medal team. The list of golfers on the USGA team, and the names of the golf associations sponsoring all three teams, can be found in other sources.) Douglass Cadwallader; Jesse Carleton; Harold Fraser; Arthur Hussey; Orus Jones; Allan Lard; George Oliver; Simeon Price; John Rahm; Harold Weber

== Participating nations ==
A total of 77 golfers from 2 nations competed at the St. Louis Games:

- Canada (3)
- United States (74)

== Medal table ==
Rank	Nation	Gold	Silver	Bronze	Total
1	United States	1	2	3	6
2	Canada	1	0	0	1
Totals (2 entries)		2	2	3	7

== Sources ==
- International Olympic Committee results database
- George Seymour Lyon - Olympic Individual gold medal winner 1904
- Wudarski, Pawel (1999). "Wyniki Igrzysk Olimpijskich" (in Polish). Archived from the original on July 14, 2015.
