= Golf at the Summer Olympics =

- IOC Code: GLF
- Governing body: IGF
- Events: 2 (men: 1; women: 1)

Summer Olympics
- 1896; 1900; 1904; 1908; 1912; 1920; 1924; 1928; 1932; 1936; 1948; 1952; 1956; 1960; 1964; 1968; 1972; 1976; 1980; 1984; 1988; 1992; 1996; 2000; 2004; 2008; 2012; 2016; 2020; 2024; 2028; 2032
- Medalists

Golf is officially recognized as first featuring in the Summer Olympic Games programme in 1900 and was also contested at the 1904 Summer Olympics. A golf tournament was to have been held in 1908, but it was cancelled less than two days before it was scheduled to start. Two golf tournaments were also to have been held in 1920, but were cancelled due to a lack of entries.

At the IOC session in Copenhagen in October 2009, the International Olympic Committee (IOC) decided to reinstate the sport for the 2016 Summer Olympics. The International Golf Federation is the governing body for golf at the Olympic Games. Qualification is based primarily upon the Official World Golf Ranking (men) and Women's World Golf Rankings, with the top 15 of each gender automatically qualifying (with a limit of four per country), and then the highest ranked players from countries that had not yet qualified two players.

== Medal table ==
Rank	Nation	Gold	Silver	Bronze	Total
1	United States	6	2	4	12
2	Great Britain	1	2	1	4
3	New Zealand	1	1	1	3
4	Canada	1	0	0	1
4	South Korea	1	0	0	1
6	Japan	0	1	1	2
7	Germany	0	1	0	1
7	Slovakia	0	1	0	1
7	Sweden	0	1	0	1
7	Switzerland	0	1	0	1
11	China	0	0	2	2
12	Chinese Taipei	0	0	1	1
12	France	0	0	1	1
Totals (13 entries)		10	10	11	31

== Events ==
1900

- Men's individual
- Women's individual

1904

- Men's individual
- Men's team

1908

A men's individual tournament was planned for the 1908 London Games, but a dispute amongst representatives of England and Scotland over the format led to British golfers boycotting, leaving 1904 gold medallist George Lyon of Canada as the only remaining entrant. He was entitled to claim the gold medal but declined.

1920

Two golf tournaments were planned at the 1920 Antwerp Games, but were cancelled due to a lack of entries.

2016

- Men's individual
- Women's individual

2020

- Men's individual
- Women's individual

2024

- Men's individual
- Women's individual

2028

- Men's individual
- Women's individual
- Mixed team

Since its reintroduction, Olympic golf competitions have consisted of 72-hole men's and women's individual stroke play tournament with no halfway cut. There had been calls for the IGF and the IOC to consider adding a match play tournament, a team tournament, and/or to open up the Olympic tournament to more golfers, possibly by using a different qualifying system than the World Golf Ranking. In April 2025, it was announced that a new mixed team event will be added to golf for the 2028 Summer Olympics; it will be contested between 16 pairs drawn from those who have qualified for the Olympic tournaments, and consist of alternate shot and four-ball rounds.

== Courses ==
Year	Host city	Course(s)
1900	(France) Paris	Compiègne Golf Club
1904	(United States) St. Louis	Glen Echo Country Club, Normandy, Missouri
1908	(United Kingdom) London	Royal St George's Golf Club, Sandwich, Kent
1908	(United Kingdom) London	Prince's Golf Club, Sandwich, Kent
1908	(United Kingdom) London	Royal Cinque Ports Golf Club, Deal, Kent
1920	(Belgium) Antwerp	Cappelen's Golf Club, Antwerp
2016	(Brazil) Rio de Janeiro	Olympic Golf Course, Barra da Tijuca
2020	(Japan) Tokyo	Kasumigaseki Country Club, Kawagoe
2024	(France) Paris	Le Golf National, Guyancourt
2028	(United States) Los Angeles	Riviera Country Club, Pacific Palisades, California
2032	(Australia) Brisbane	Royal Queensland Golf Club, Eagle Farm, Queensland

== Medal summary ==
=== Men's individual ===
Games	Gold	Silver	Bronze
1900 Paris	Charles Sands; United States	Walter Rutherford; Great Britain	David Robertson; Great Britain
1904 St. Louis	George Lyon; Canada	Chandler Egan; United States	Burt McKinnie; United States; Francis Newton; United States
1908	cancelled (Note: A dispute amongst representatives of England and Scotland over the format led to British golfers boycotting, leaving 1904 gold medallist George Lyon of Canada as the only remaining entrant. Olympic organisers offered to award Lyon the gold medal by default, but Lyon refused it.)		
1912	not included in the Olympic program		
1920	cancelled (Note: Cancelled due to lack of entries.)		
1924–2012	not included in the Olympic program		
2016 Rio	Justin Rose; Great Britain	Henrik Stenson; Sweden	Matt Kuchar; United States
2020 Tokyo	Xander Schauffele; United States	Rory Sabbatini; Slovakia	Pan Cheng-tsung; Chinese Taipei
2024 Paris	Scottie Scheffler; United States	Tommy Fleetwood; Great Britain	Hideki Matsuyama; Japan
2028 Los Angeles			

=== Women's individual ===
Games	Gold	Silver	Bronze
1900 Paris	Margaret Abbott; United States	Pauline Whittier (USA); Switzerland (Note: In 2024, the IOC reinstated its original and current attribution policy for athletes at the early Olympic Games (1896–1904). From 2021 to 2024, the IOC briefly attributed medals in individual events according to the athlete's nationality, even when the athlete represented a foreign club or team. Since 2024, participation and medals have instead been attributed according to the national affiliation of the club or team represented by the athlete.)	Abbie Pratt (USA); France
1904–2012	not included in the Olympic program		
2016 Rio	Inbee Park; South Korea	Lydia Ko; New Zealand	Shanshan Feng; China
2020 Tokyo	Nelly Korda; United States	Mone Inami; Japan	Lydia Ko; New Zealand
2024 Paris	Lydia Ko; New Zealand	Esther Henseleit; Germany	Lin Xiyu; China
2028 Los Angeles			

=== Men's team ===
Games	Gold	Silver	Bronze
1904 St. Louis	United States: Robert Hunter; Chandler Egan; Kenneth Edwards; Clement Smoot; Walter Egan; Daniel Sawyer; Edward Cummins; Mason Phelps; Nathaniel Moore; Warren Wood	United States: Albert Lambert; Stuart Stickney; Burt McKinnie; William Stickney; Ralph McKittrick; Frederick Semple; Francis Newton; Henry Potter; John Cady; John Maxwell	United States: Douglass Cadwallader; Allan Lard; Jesse Carleton; Simeon Price; Harold Weber; John Rahm; Arthur Hussey; Orus Jones; Harold Fraser; George Oliver

== Participating nations ==
22 golfers competed in 1900. The 1904 tournament featured 77 golfers. Albert Lambert was the only golfer who competed both times; a total of 98 different golfers competed throughout the brief history of Olympic golf before it was brought back in 2016.

Nation	96	00	04	08	12	20	24	28	32	36	48	52	56	60	64	68	72	76	80	84	88	92	96	00	04	08	12	16	20	24	Years
Argentina																												2	1	2	3
Australia																												4	4	4	3
Austria																												2	3	3	3
Bangladesh																												1			1
Belgium																												3	3	3	3
Brazil																												3			1
Canada			3																									4	4	4	4
Chile																												1	2	2	3
China																												4	4	4	3
Chinese Taipei																												4	3	4	3
Colombia																												1	2	3	3
Czech Republic																												1	2	2	3
Denmark																												4	4	4	3
Ecuador																													1		1
Finland																												4	4	4	3
France		9																										4	4	4	4
Germany																												4	4	4	3
Great Britain		4																										4	4	4	4
Greece		1																													1
Hong Kong																												1	1		2
India																												3	4	4	3
Ireland																												4	4	4	3
Israel																												1			1
Italy																												4	4	3	3
Japan																												4	4	4	3
Malaysia																												4	2	2	3
Mexico																												3	4	4	3
Morocco																												1	1	1	3
Netherlands																												1	1	1	3
New Zealand																												3	2	3	3
Norway																												3	3	4	3
Paraguay																												2	1	1	3
Philippines																												1	3	2	3
Poland																													1	1	2
Portugal																												2			1
Puerto Rico																													2	1	2
Russia																												1			1
Singapore																														1	1
Slovakia																													1		1
Slovenia																													1	2	1
South Africa																												4	2	4	3
South Korea																												6	6	5	3
Spain																												4	4	4	3
Sweden																												4	4	4	3
Switzerland																												2	2	3	3
Thailand																												4	4	4	3
United States		8	74																									7	8	7	5
Venezuela																												1	1		2
Zimbabwe																													1		1
Nations		4	2																									41	42	38	49
Athletes		22	77																									120	120	120	
Year	96	00	04	08	12	20	24	28	32	36	48	52	56	60	64	68	72	76	80	84	88	92	96	00	04	08	12	16	20	24	

== See also ==
- List of Olympic venues in golf
