= Golf at the 1904 Summer Olympics – Men's individual =

Coordinates: 38°42′04″N 90°18′02″W

Men's individual golf at the Games of the III Olympiad
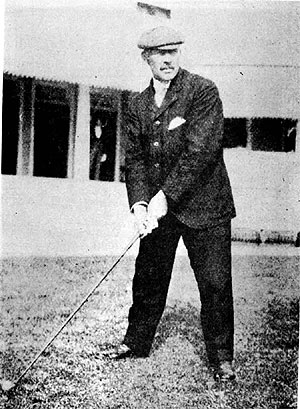
- George Lyon during the golf tournament
- Venue: Glen Echo Country Club
- Dates: September 19–24, 1904
- Competitors: 75 from 2 nations

Medalists
1st place, gold medalist(s)		George Lyon; Canada
2nd place, silver medalist(s)		Chandler Egan; United States
3rd place, bronze medalist(s)		Burt McKinnie; United States
3rd place, bronze medalist(s)		Francis Newton; United States

The men's individual was an event held as part of the golf programme at the 1904 Summer Olympics. It was the second time the event was held at the Olympics, though it took a much different format than the 1900 golf tournament. 75 golfers from two nations competed. The competition was held approximately 5.75 km north of the Olympic Stadium at Glen Echo Country Club from September 19 to 24, 1904. The event was won by George Lyon of Canada, one of three golfers not from the host United States. Lyon defeated American Chandler Egan in the final, giving Egan the silver medal. Americans Burt McKinnie and Francis Newton were the defeated semifinalists, each receiving bronze.

== Background ==
The first Olympic golf tournaments were held at the 1900 Games, with events for both men and women. One of the men's players was Albert Bond Lambert, who finished eighth in the (Olympic) men's tournament and first in the (non-Olympic) handicap tournament. Lambert and his father-in-law George McGrew, prominent businessmen in the St. Louis area, determined to bring golf to the 1904 Games that would be held in St. Louis. They founded the Glen Echo Country Club and pressed for the inclusion of golf on the programme with a tournament to be held at Glen Echo. The result was the second Olympic golf tournament, though the women's individual event was dropped and a men's team event added.

Golf was later planned to be on the programme for the 1908 Games in London, but a dispute among the British golfers led to them all boycotting. With only the Canadian defending champion Lyon scheduled to compete (and him unwilling to accept a gold medal by walkover), the 1908 golf event was cancelled. Golf would not be held again at the Olympics until 2016.

Canada made its debut in the event. The United States made its second appearance, the only nation to have golfers at both of the first two men's individual golf tournaments.

== Competition format ==
The format for the 1904 men's individual tournament was a grueling one. In contrast to the 1900 Games, which used a 36-hole stroke play tournament as the entire competition, the 1904 tournament started with a 36-hole stroke play qualifying round. This was followed by the top 32 qualifiers playing a 5-round match play tournament with each round consisting of 36 holes. Each round was played on consecutive days, resulting in the finalists playing six straight days of 36 holes of golf. No bronze medal match was played; both semifinal losers received bronze medals.

== Schedule ==
Date	Time	Round
Monday, September 19, 1904		Qualifying
Tuesday, September 20, 1904		Round of 32
Wednesday, September 21, 1904		Round of 16
Thursday, September 22, 1904		Quarterfinals
Friday, September 23, 1904		Semifinals
Saturday, September 24, 1904		Final

== Results ==
=== Qualifying round ===
Golfers played two 18-hole rounds in qualifying play on September 19. The top 32 golfers advanced to match play.

Rank	Player	Nation	Score	Notes
1	Ralph McKittrick	United States	163	Q
1	Stuart Stickney	United States	163	Q
3	Francis Newton	United States	164	Q
4	Walter Egan	United States	165	Q
4	William Stickney	United States	165	Q
6	Chandler Egan	United States	166	Q
6	Mason Phelps	United States	166	Q
8	Albert Bond Lambert	United States	168	Q
9	George Lyon	Canada	169	Q
9	Daniel Sawyer	United States	169	Q
11	Douglass Cadwallader	United States	170	Q
11	Burt McKinnie	United States	170	Q
11	Warren Wood	United States	170	Q
14	Robert Hunter	United States	171	Q
15	Henry Potter	United States	173	Q
16	Jesse Carleton	United States	174	Q
16	Simpson Foulis	United States	174	Q
16	Harold Weber	United States	174	Q
19	Orus Jones	United States	177	Q
19	Nathaniel Moore	United States	177	Q
19	Simeon Price	United States	177	Q
22	Harry Allen	United States	178	Q
22	Arthur Havemeyer	United States	178	Q
22	Clement Smoot	United States	178	Q
25	Edward Cummins	United States	179	Q
26	Frederick Semple	United States	180	Q
27	John Cady	United States	182	Q
27	Abner Vickery	United States	182	Q
29	Harold Fraser	United States	183	Q
29	Raymond Havemeyer	United States	183	Q
29	Allan Lard	United States	183	Q
29	William Smith	United States	183	Q
33	Bart Adams	United States	184	
33	William Burton	United States	184	
35	Tim Boyd	United States	185	
35	Charles Scudder	United States	185	
37	Edwin Hunter	United States	187	
37	Harold Simpkins	United States	187	
39	John Rahm	United States	188	
40	Arthur Hussey	United States	191	
40	Herbert Sumney	United States	191	
42	Campbell Brown	United States	192	
42	Henry Case	United States	192	
42	Edgar Davis	United States	192	
45	Robert Thach	United States	195	
45	George Powell	United States	195	
45	Charles Willard	United States	195	
48	Clarkson Potter	United States	196	
48	George Thomas	United States	196	
50	George Oliver	United States	197	
51	W. A. Hersey	United States	198	
52	John Brandt	United States	199	
52	Bernard Edmunds	United States	199	
54	Frederick Newbery	United States	201	
55	Alfred Annan	United States	202	
55	Leon Hazelton	United States	202	
57	Murray Carleton	United States	203	
58	Louis Allis	United States	205	
59	John Watson	United States	206	
60	Jarvis Hunt	United States	207	
60	Alexander Mackintosh	United States	207	
62	Wallace Shaw	United States	209	
62	William Withers	United States	209	
64	Joseph Howard	United States	210	
65	Bertie Austin	Canada	211	
66	James Stack	United States	213	
66	Meade Yates	United States	213	
68	William Groseclose	United States	214	
68	Simon Harbaugh	United States	214	
70	Edward Lansing	United States	219	
71	Edward Gould	United States	222	
72	Clarence Angier	United States	226	
73	Albert Austin	Canada	230	
74	Lee Jones	United States	240	
—	Charles B. Cory	United States	DNF	

=== Match play ===
Round of 32
Burt McKinnie (USA)	37h
Harold Weber (USA)	–
Robert Hunter (USA)	8&7
Raymond Havemeyer (USA)	–
Simpson Foulis (USA)	5&3
Henry Potter (USA)	–
Daniel Sawyer (USA)	8&7
Jesse Carleton (USA)	–
William Stickney (USA)	2&1
Clement Smoot (USA)	–
Harry Allen (USA)	6&4
Warren Wood (USA)	–
Nathaniel Moore (USA)	12&10
Orus Jones (USA)	–
Chandler Egan (USA)	8&6
Harold Fraser (USA)	–
Stuart Stickney (USA)	7&6
William Smith (USA)	–
George Lyon (CAN)	5&4
John Cady (USA)	–
Albert Bond Lambert (USA)	7&6
Walter Egan (USA)	–
Ralph McKittrick (USA)	2&1
Douglass Cadwallader (USA)	–
Mason Phelps (USA)	6&4
Frederick Semple (USA)	–
Arthur Havemeyer (USA)	8&7
Simeon Price (USA)	–
Allan Lard (USA)	10&9
Abner Vickery (USA)	–
Francis Newton (USA)	8&7
Edward Cummins (USA)	–

Round of 16
McKinnie (USA)	7&6
Hunter (USA)	–
Foulis (USA)	–
Sawyer (USA)	2&1
Stickney (USA)	–
Allen (USA)	4&3
Moore (USA)	–
C. Egan (USA)	7&6
Stickney (USA)	–
Lyon (CAN)	11&9
Lambert (USA)	1 up
McKittrick (USA)	–
Phelps (USA)	12&10
A. Havemeyer (USA)	–
Lard (USA)	–
Newton (USA)	2&1

Quarterfinals
McKinnie (USA)	4&3
Sawyer (USA)	–
Allen (USA)	–
C. Egan (USA)	4&3
Lyon (CAN)	5&4
Lambert (USA)	–
Phelps (USA)	–
Newton (USA)	2&1

Semifinals
McKinnie (USA)	–
C. Egan (USA)	4&3
Lyon (CAN)	1 up
Newton (USA)	–

Final
C. Egan (USA)	–
Lyon (CAN)	3&2

== Sources ==
- Wudarski, Pawel. "Wyniki Igrzysk Olimpijskich (Olympic Results)" (PDF) (in Polish). Archived from the original (PDF) on August 16, 2012.
