= Jim Draper =

Scottish golfer

James W. Draper (1925 – 23 February 2006) was a Scottish amateur golfer.

== Golf career ==
Draper was the Scottish Amateur golf champion in 1954. He won the tournament 4 & 3 at Nairn Golf Club.

Thirty three years later, Colin Montgomerie won the Scottish Amateur title on the same course. Both golfers attended Strathallan School in Perthshire, Scotland.

== See also ==
- List of male golfers
