= Golf at the 1904 Summer Olympics – Men's team =

Coordinates: 38°42′04″N 90°18′02″W

Men's team golf at the Games of the III Olympiad
- Venue: Glen Echo Golf Club
- Date: September 17
- Competitors: 30 from 1 nation

Medalists
1st place, gold medalist(s)		Western Golf Association; United States
2nd place, silver medalist(s)		Trans-Mississippi Golf Association; United States
3rd place, bronze medalist(s)		United States Golf Association; United States

The men's team event was held as part of the golf programme at the 1904 Summer Olympics. It was the last time a golf event was held at the Olympics until 2016. Three teams of 10 golfers competed. The competition was held on September 17, 1904.

== Rosters ==
While six teams had originally entered, only two turned up on the morning of the event: those representing the Western Golf Association and the Trans-Mississippi Golf Association.

At the last minute, a group of players who were entering the individual event were able to form a team: as they were all members of the United States Golf Association, they competed under the banner of that organization.

Note: Kenneth Edwards and John Maxwell did not compete in the subsequent individual event.

Western Golf Association

Edward Cummins
Kenneth Edwards
Chandler Egan
Walter Egan
Robert Hunter
Nathaniel Moore
Mason Phelps
Daniel Sawyer
Clement Smoot
Warren Wood

Trans-Mississippi Golf Association

John Cady
Albert Bond Lambert
John Maxwell
Burt McKinnie
Ralph McKittrick
Francis Newton
Henry Potter
Frederick Semple
Stuart Stickney
William Stickney

United States Golf Association

Douglass Cadwallader
Jesse Carleton
Harold Fraser
Arthur Hussey
Orus Jones
Allan Lard
George Oliver
Simeon Price
John Rahm
Harold Weber

== Results ==
=== Individual results ===
The individual results for the 10 golfers on each team were summed to determine the team standings.

Place	Player	Score	Team	Team finish
1	Chandler Egan (USA)	165	WGA	Gold
2	Douglass Cadwallader (USA)	168	USGA	Bronze
2	Daniel Sawyer (USA)	168	WGA	Gold
4	Robert Hunter (USA)	169	WGA	Gold
5	Kenneth Edwards (USA)	170	WGA	Gold
6	Allan Lard (USA)	172	USGA	Bronze
6	Francis Newton (USA)	172	TMGA	Silver
6	Henry Potter (USA)	172	TMGA	Silver
6	Clement Smoot (USA)	172	WGA	Gold
10	Warren Wood (USA)	173	WGA	Gold
11	Ralph McKittrick (USA)	174	TMGA	Silver
12	Jesse Carleton (USA)	175	USGA	Bronze
12	Albert Bond Lambert (USA)	175	TMGA	Silver
14	Frederick Semple (USA)	176	TMGA	Silver
15	Mason Phelps (USA)	177	WGA	Gold
15	Stuart Stickney (USA)	177	TMGA	Silver
17	Burt McKinnie (USA)	178	TMGA	Silver
17	William Stickney (USA)	178	TMGA	Silver
19	Walter Egan (USA)	180	WGA	Gold
20	Simeon Price (USA)	181	USGA	Bronze
21	John Maxwell (USA)	182	TMGA	Silver
22	Harold Weber (USA)	183	USGA	Bronze
23	John Cady (USA)	186	TMGA	Silver
23	John Rahm (USA)	186	USGA	Bronze
25	Edward Cummins (USA)	187	WGA	Gold
25	Arthur Hussey (USA)	187	USGA	Bronze
25	Orus Jones (USA)	187	USGA	Bronze
28	Nathaniel Moore (USA)	188	WGA	Gold
29	Harold Fraser (USA)	194	USGA	Bronze
30	George Oliver (USA)	206	USGA	Bronze

=== Team scores ===
Place	Team	Score
Gold	United States; Western Golf Association	1749
Silver	United States; Trans-Mississippi Golf Association	1770
Bronze	United States; United States Golf Association	1839

== Sources ==
- Wudarski, Pawel. "Wyniki Igrzysk Olimpijskich (Olympic Results)" (PDF) (in Polish). Archived from the original (PDF) on 16 August 2012.
