= Henry Potter (golfer) =

American golfer

Personal information
- Born: October 4, 1881 St. Louis, Missouri, U.S.
- Died: January 24, 1955 (aged 73) New York, New York, U.S.

Career
- Sport: Golf
Medal record
Men's golf
Representing United States
Olympic Games
Silver medal – second place	1904 St. Louis	Team

Henry or Harry Potter (October 4, 1881 – January 24, 1955) was an American golfer who competed in the 1904 Summer Olympics.

== Career ==
In 1904 he was part of the American team which won the silver medal. Potter was the best player for his team together with his teammate Francis Newton he placed sixth in this competition. In the individual competition he finished 15th in the qualification and was eliminated in the first round of the match play.
