= Douglass Cadwallader =

American golfer (1884–1971)

Personal information
- Full name: Douglass Pope Cadwallader
- Nickname: "Doug"
- Born: January 29, 1884 Springfield, Illinois, U.S.
- Died: February 7, 1971 (aged 87) Minneapolis, Minnesota, U.S.

Career
- Sport: Golf
Medal record
Men's golf
Representing United States
Olympic Games
Bronze medal – third place	1904 St. Louis	Team

Douglass Pope "Doug" Cadwallader (January 29, 1884 – February 7, 1971) was an American golfer who competed in the 1904 Summer Olympics.

== Golf career ==
In 1904 he was part of the American team which won the bronze medal. He finished second in this competition. In the individual competition he finished 11th in the qualification and was eliminated in the first round of the match play.

== Death ==
He died in Hennepin County, Minnesota. He is buried in Lakewood Cemetery in Minneapolis.
