= Jesse Carleton =

American amateur golfer

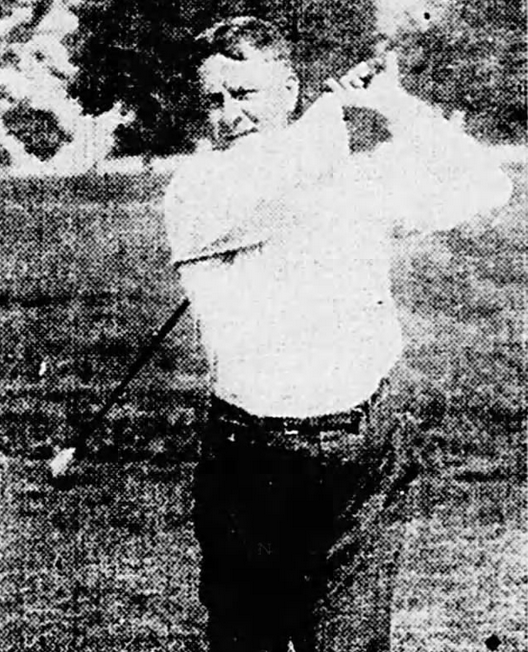

Personal information
- Full name: Jesse Lee Carleton
- Born: August 20, 1862 Cumberland, Maryland, U.S.
- Died: December 6, 1921 (aged 59) St. Louis, Missouri, U.S.

Career
- Sport: Golf
- Status: Amateur
Medal record
Olympic Games
Men's Golf
Bronze medal – third place	1904 St. Louis	Team

Jesse Lee Carleton (August 20, 1862 – December 6, 1921) was an American golfer who competed in the 1904 Summer Olympics.

== Biography ==
Jesse Carleton was born in Cumberland, Maryland.

In 1904 he was part of the American team which won the bronze medal. He finished twelfth in this competition. In the individual competition he finished 16th in the qualification and was eliminated in the first round of the match play.

Outside of golf, he owned the Carleton Dry Goods Company. He was president of the Missouri State Golf Association for three years, and president of the Sunset Hill Country Club for three years.

Jesse Carleton died from a cerebral hemorrhage at his home in St. Louis on December 6, 1921.
