= Francis Newton (golfer) =

American amateur golfer (1874–1946)

Personal information
- Full name: Francis Clement Newton
- Nationality: United States
- Born: January 3, 1874
- Died: August 3, 1946 (aged 72)

Career
- Sport: Golf
- Status: Amateur
Medal record
Men's golf
Representing United States
Olympic Games
Silver medal – second place	1904 St. Louis	team
Bronze medal – third place	1904 St. Louis	individual

Francis Clement Newton (January 3, 1874 – August 3, 1946) was an American golfer who competed in the 1904 Summer Olympics.

== Career ==
In 1904 he was part of the American team which won the silver medal. Newton was the best player for his team together with his teammate Henry Potter he placed sixth in this competition. In the individual competition he won the bronze medal after losing in the semi-finals.
