= Frederick Semple =

American golfer and tennis player

Medal record

Men's golf

Representing the United States

Olympic Games
Silver medal – second place	1904 St. Louis	Team

Frederick Humphrey Semple (December 24, 1872 – December 20, 1927) was an American golfer and tennis player who competed in the 1904 Summer Olympics.

== Golf career ==
In 1904, Semple was part of the American team which won the silver medal in the team golf event. He finished 14th in this competition. In the individual competition he finished 26th in the qualification and was eliminated in the first round of the match play.

Semple also competed in the tennis doubles tournament with his partner George Stadel, but they were eliminated in the first round.
