= Edward Cummins =

American golfer (1886–1926)

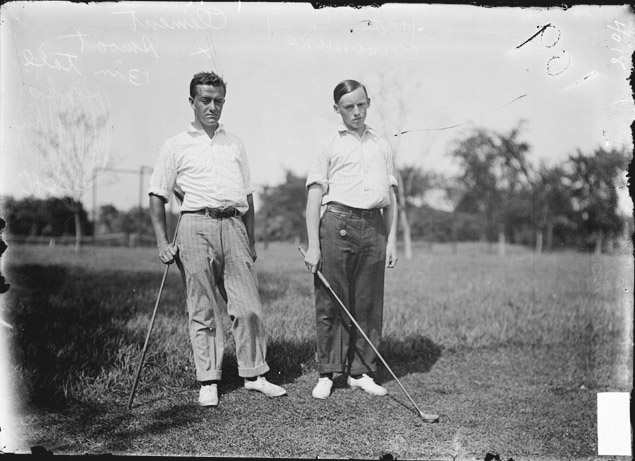
- Cummins (right) with Clement Smoot.

Personal information
- Born: July 25, 1886 Chicago, Illinois
- Died: November 21, 1926 (aged 40) New Britain, Connecticut
Medal record
Men's golf
Representing the United States
Olympic Games
Gold medal – first place	1904 St. Louis	Men's team

Edward McClellan Cummins (July 25, 1886 – November 21, 1926) was an American golfer who competed in the 1904 Summer Olympics. In 1904 he was part of the American team which won the gold medal. He finished 25th in this competition. In the individual competition he finished 25th in the qualification and was eliminated in the first round of the match play. He died in a car accident in 1926.
