= Kenneth Edwards (golfer) =

American golfer

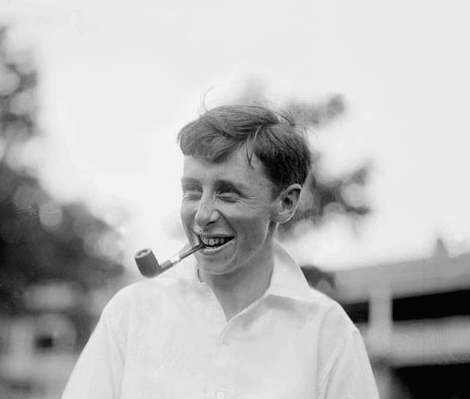

Personal information
- Born: March 9, 1886
- Died: December 21, 1952 (aged 66)
Medal record
Men's golf
Representing the United States
Olympic Games
Gold medal – first place	1904 St. Louis	Men's team

Kenneth Paine Edwards (March 9, 1886 – December 21, 1952) was an American golfer who competed in the 1904 Summer Olympics.

== Career ==
In 1904 he was part of the American team which won the gold medal. He finished fifth in this competition.
