= John Rahm =

American golfer (1854–1935)

Personal information
- Full name: John Butler Rahm
- Born: January 8, 1854 Richmond, Virginia, U.S.
- Died: July 28, 1935 (aged 81) Omaha, Nebraska, U.S.

Career
- Sport: Golf
Medal record
Men's golf
Representing United States
Olympic Games
Bronze medal – third place	1904 St. Louis	Team

John Butler Rahm (January 8, 1854 – July 28, 1935) was an American golfer who competed in the 1904 Summer Olympics.

== Career ==
In 1904 he was part of the American team which won the bronze medal. He finished 23rd in this competition. In the individual competition he finished 39th in the qualification and did not advance to the match play.

He was born in Richmond, Virginia, and died in Omaha, Nebraska.
