= John Maxwell (golfer) =

American golfer (1871–1906)

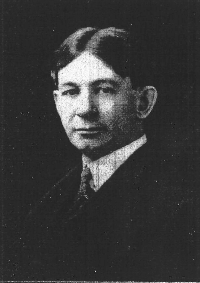

Personal information
- Full name: John Riley Maxwell
- Born: July 16, 1871 Olena, Illinois, U.S.
- Died: June 3, 1906 (aged 34) Keokuk, Iowa, U.S.
Medal record
Men's golf
Representing the United States
Olympic Games
Silver medal – second place	1904 St. Louis	Team

John Riley Maxwell (July 16, 1871 – June 3, 1906) was an American golfer who competed in the 1904 Summer Olympics.

== Career ==
In 1900, Maxwell won the inaugural Iowa Amateur. He also won the Trans-Mississippi Amateur in 1903.

In 1904, Maxwell was part of the American team which won the silver medal. He finished 21st in this competition.

Maxwell died in Keokuk, Iowa.

== Amateur wins ==
- 1900 Iowa Amateur
- 1903 Trans-Mississippi Amateur

== Awards and honors ==
In 2011, Maxwell was inducted into the Iowa Golf Hall of Fame.
