= George Oliver (golfer) =

American golfer

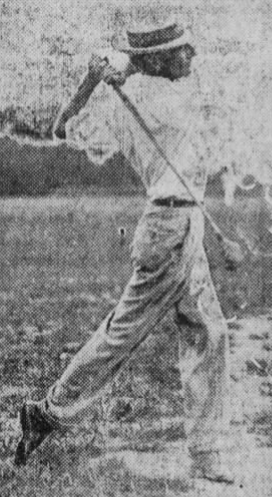

Personal information
- Full name: George Charles Oliver
- Born: January 18, 1883 Birmingham, Alabama, U.S.
- Died: August 20, 1965 (aged 82) Tampa, Florida, U.S.

Career
- Sport: Golf
Medal record
Men's golf
Representing United States
Olympic Games
| Bronze medal – third place | 1904 St. Louis | Team |

George Charles Oliver (January 18, 1883 – August 20, 1965) was an American golfer who competed in the 1904 Summer Olympics.

== Career ==
George Charles Oliver was born on January 18, 1883, in Birmingham, Alabama.

Oliver was part of the United States Golf Association team which won the bronze medal in the men's team event at the 1904 Summer Olympics. He finished 30th in this competition. In the individual competition he finished 50th in the qualification and did not advance to the match play. He was the runner-up at the Southern Amateur in Memphis, Tennessee, in 1909. The Birmingham News said he was "one of the coolest and nerviest golf players who ever went on the links." In 1909, he was ranked the third best golfer in the South by the Southern Golf Association. In 1910, he was ranked fourth.

In 1913, Oliver wrote a special for The Birmingham News about the Southern golf championship in Montgomery, Alabama. He won his second Birmingham Country Club golf championship in 1914. For a time, he was chairman of the Birmingham Country Club.

Oliver died on August 20, 1965, in Tampa, Florida, at the age of 82.
