= Clement Smoot =

American golfer (1884–1963)

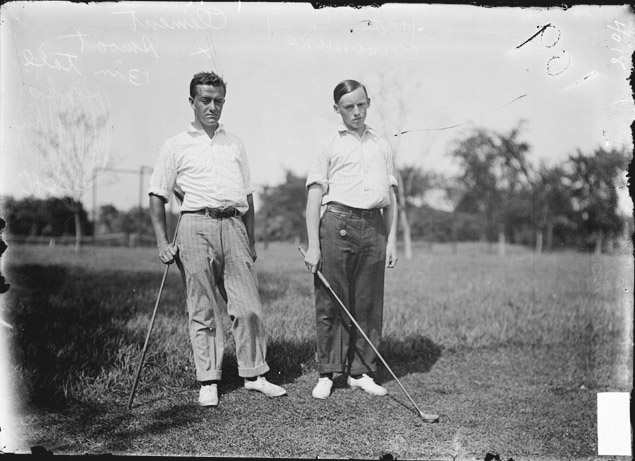
- Golfer Clement Smoot (left) with Edward Cummins

Medal record

Men's golf

Representing the United States

Olympic Games
Gold medal – first place	1904 St. Louis	Team

Clement Eyer Smoot (April 7, 1884 – January 19, 1963) was an American golfer who competed in the 1904 Summer Olympics.

== Career ==
Smoot was born in Illinois and died in Los Angeles, California. In 1904, he was part of the American team which won the gold medal. He finished 6th in this competition. In the individual competition he finished 22nd in the qualification and was eliminated in the first round of the match play. Smoot was also a successful businessman as he founded an industrial lighting company called Smoot-Holman Electrical Company.
