= Arthur Hussey =

American golfer

Personal information
- Full name: Arthur Duncan Hussey
- Born: March 5, 1882 Toledo, Ohio, U.S.
- Died: April 3, 1915 (aged 33) Taylor's Flat, California, U.S.

Career
- Sport: Golf
Medal record
Men's golf
Representing United States
Olympic Games
Bronze medal – third place	1904 St. Louis	team

Arthur Duncan Hussey (March 5, 1882 – April 3, 1915) was an American golfer who competed in the 1904 Summer Olympics.

== Career ==
At the 1904 Olympics, Hussey was part of the American team which won the bronze medal.
