= Orus Jones =

American golfer (1867-1963)

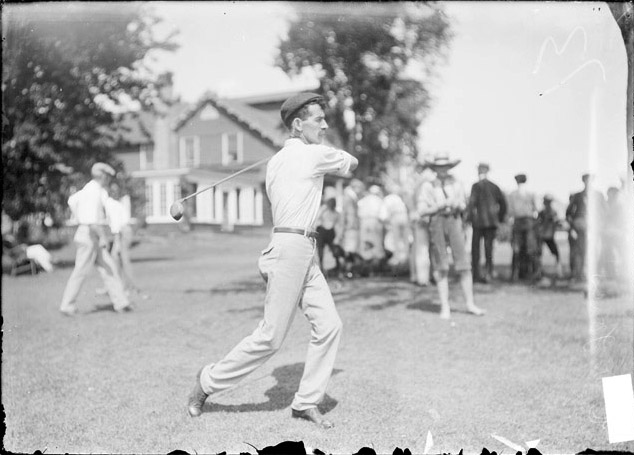

Medal record

Men's Golf

Olympic Games
Bronze medal – third place	1904 St. Louis	team

Orus W. Jones (March 8, 1867 – August 10, 1963) was an American golfer who competed in the 1904 Summer Olympics.

== Career ==
He was born in Jackson, Ohio. In 1904, he was part of the American team which won the bronze medal. In the individual competition, he finished 19th in the qualification round and was eliminated in the first round of the match play.

In singles, however, he was eliminated in the first round by Nathaniel Moore.

Jones was a dentist by profession.
