= United States at the 1904 Summer Olympics =

- Flag of the United States
- IOC code: USA
- NOC: United States Olympic Committee

in St. Louis
- Competitors: 530 in 16 sports
- Medals Ranked 1st: Gold 80 Silver 85 Bronze 83 Total 248

Summer Olympics appearances (overview)
- 1896; 1900; 1904; 1908; 1912; 1920; 1924; 1928; 1932; 1936; 1948; 1952; 1956; 1960; 1964; 1968; 1972; 1976; 1980; 1984; 1988; 1992; 1996; 2000; 2004; 2008; 2012; 2016; 2020; 2024; 2028

Other related appearances
- 1906 Intercalated Games

The United States hosted the 1904 Summer Olympics in St. Louis, Missouri. American athletes won a total of 231 medals, setting a record for the most medals won at a single Olympics that still stands today.

== Medalists ==
Medal	Name	Sport	Event	Date
Gold	Max Emmerich	Athletics	Men's triathlon	July 2
Gold	Julius Lenhart (AUT) (Note: Austrian Julius Lenhart (AUT) (gymnastics; one gold and one silver), Norwegians Bernhoff Hansen (NOR) and Charles Ericksen (NOR) (wrestling; one gold each), Frenchman Albert Corey (FRA) (athletics; one silver), Australian Francis Gailey (AUS) (swimming; three silver and one bronze), German Frank Kugler (GER) (wrestling and weightlifting; one silver and two bronze), Austrian Otto Wahle (AUT) (swimming; one bronze), and Swiss Gustav Tiefenthaler (SUI) (wrestling; one bronze) represented American clubs, and their results were attributed to the United States.)	Gymnastics	Men's all-around	July 2
Gold	John Grieb; Anton Heida; Max Hess; Philip Kassel; Julius Lenhart (AUT) (Note: At the 1904 Summer Olympics three team event medals (1 gold, 1 silver, and 1 bronze) won by American clubs competing as mixed teams—composed primarily of American athletes alongside a few non-American participants—were attributed to the United States: gold in the gymnastics team all-around, silver in the 4 mile team race, and bronze in the tug of war team competition.); Ernst Reckeweg	Gymnastics	Men's team all-around	July 2
Gold	Frank Greer	Rowing	Men's single sculls	July 30
Gold	Robert Farnan; Joseph Ryan	Rowing	Men's coxless pair	July 30
Gold	John Mulcahy; William Varley	Rowing	Men's double sculls	July 30
Gold	George Dietz; August Erker; Albert Nasse; Arthur Stockhoff	Rowing	Men's coxless four	July 30
Gold	Louis Abell; Charles Armstrong; Frederick Cresser; Joseph Dempsey; John Exley; James Flanagan; Michael Gleason; Harry Lott; Frank Schell	Rowing	Men's eight	July 30
Gold	Marcus Hurley	Cycling	1/2 mile	August 2
Gold	Marcus Hurley	Cycling	1/4 mile	August 3
Gold	Burton Downing	Cycling	2 miles	August 3
Gold	Marcus Hurley	Cycling	1/3 mile	August 5
Gold	Marcus Hurley	Cycling	1 mile	August 5
Gold	Charles Schlee	Cycling	5 miles	August 5
Gold	Burton Downing	Cycling	25 miles	August 5
Gold	Charles Jacobus	Roque		August 8
Gold	Archie Hahn	Athletics	Men's 60 m	August 29
Gold	Harry Hillman	Athletics	Men's 400 m	August 29
Gold	James Lightbody	Athletics	Men's 2590 m steeplechase	August 29
Gold	Samuel Jones	Athletics	Men's high jump	August 29
Gold	Ray Ewry	Athletics	Men's standing long jump	August 29
Gold	John Flanagan	Athletics	Men's hammer throw	August 29
Gold	Thomas Hicks	Athletics	Men's marathon	August 30
Gold	Archie Hahn	Athletics	Men's 200 m	August 31
Gold	Harry Hillman	Athletics	Men's 400 m hurdles	August 31
Gold	Ray Ewry	Athletics	Men's standing high jump	August 31
Gold	Ralph Rose	Athletics	Men's shot put	August 31
Gold	Harry Hillman	Athletics	Men's 200 m hurdles	September 1
Gold	James Lightbody	Athletics	Men's 800 m	September 1
Gold	Myer Prinstein	Athletics	Men's long jump	September 1
Gold	Myer Prinstein	Athletics	Men's triple jump	September 1
Gold	Henry Seiling; Patrick Flanagan; Sidney Johnson; Conrad Magnusson; Oscar Olson	Tug of war		September 1
Gold	Archie Hahn	Athletics	Men's 100 m	September 3
Gold	James Lightbody	Athletics	Men's 1500 m	September 3
Gold	Fred Schule	Athletics	Men's 110 m hurdles	September 3
Gold	David Munson; Arthur L. Newton; Paul Pilgrim; George Underwood; Howard Valentine	Athletics	Men's 4 miles team race	September 3
Gold	Charles Dvorak	Athletics	Men's pole vault	September 3
Gold	Ray Ewry	Athletics	Men's standing triple jump	September 3
Gold	Martin Sheridan	Athletics	Men's discus throw	September 3
Gold	Beals Wright	Tennis	Men's singles	September 3
Gold	Edgar Leonard; Beals Wright	Tennis	Men's doubles	September 3
Gold	Oscar Osthoff	Weightlifting	Men's all-around dumbbell	September 3
Gold	William Dickey	Diving	Plunge for distance	September 5
Gold	Charles Daniels	Swimming	Men's 220 yd freestyle	September 6
Gold	David Bratton; Leo Goodwin; Louis Handley; David Hesser; Joe Ruddy; James Steen; George Van Cleaf	Water polo		September 6
Gold	George Sheldon	Diving	Platform	September 7
Gold	Charles Daniels	Swimming	Men's 440 yd freestyle	September 7
Gold	Charles Daniels; Louis Handley; Leo Goodwin; Joe Ruddy	Swimming	Men's 4 x 50 yd freestyle relay	September 7
Gold	Albertson Van Zo Post	Fencing	Men's singlestick	September 8
Gold	Edward Cummins; Kenneth Edwards; Chandler Egan; Walter Egan; Robert Hunter; Nathaniel Moore; Mason Phelps; Daniel Sawyer; Clement Smoot; Warren Wood	Golf	Men's team	September 17
Gold	George Bryant	Archery	Men's double American round	September 19
Gold	Matilda Howell	Archery	Women's double Columbia round	September 19
Gold	George Bryant	Archery	Men's double York round	September 20
Gold	Matilda Howell	Archery	Women's double National round	September 20
Gold	Louis Maxson; Galen Spencer; William Thompson; Robert Williams	Archery	Men's team round	September 21
Gold	Matilda Howell; Eliza Pollock; Leonie Taylor; Emily Woodruff	Archery	Women's team round	September 21
Gold	George Finnegan	Boxing	Flyweight	September 22
Gold	Oliver Kirk	Boxing	Bantamweight	September 22
Gold	Oliver Kirk	Boxing	Featherweight	September 22
Gold	Harry Spanjer	Boxing	Lightweight	September 22
Gold	Albert Young	Boxing	Welterweight	September 22
Gold	Charles Mayer	Boxing	Middleweight	September 22
Gold	Samuel Berger	Boxing	Heavyweight	September 22
Gold	Robert Curry	Wrestling	Men's freestyle light flyweight	October 15
Gold	George Mehnert	Wrestling	Men's freestyle flyweight	October 15
Gold	Isidor Niflot	Wrestling	Men's freestyle bantamweight	October 15
Gold	Benjamin Bradshaw	Wrestling	Men's freestyle featherweight	October 15
Gold	Otto Roehm	Wrestling	Men's freestyle lightweight	October 15
Gold	Charles Ericksen (NOR)	Wrestling	Men's freestyle welterweight	October 15
Gold	Bernhoff Hansen (NOR)	Wrestling	Men's freestyle heavyweight	October 15
Gold	Anton Heida	Gymnastics	Men's combined	October 28
Gold	Anton Heida	Gymnastics	Men's horizontal bar	October 28
Gold	Anton Heida	Gymnastics	Men's pommel horse	October 28
Gold	Anton Heida	Gymnastics	Men's vault	October 28
Gold	Edward Hennig	Gymnastics	Men's horizontal bar	October 28
Gold	Edward Hennig	Gymnastics	Men's club swinging	October 28
Gold	George Eyser	Gymnastics	Men's parallel bars	October 28
Gold	George Eyser	Gymnastics	Men's rope climbing	October 28
Gold	George Eyser	Gymnastics	Men's vault	October 28
Gold	Herman Glass	Gymnastics	Men's rings	October 28
Silver	John Grieb	Athletics	Men's triathlon	July 2
Silver	Julius Lenhart (AUT)	Gymnastics	Men's triathlon	July 2
Silver	Emil Beyer; John Bissinger; Arthur Rosenkampff; Julian Schmitz; Otto Steffen; Max Wolf	Gymnastics	Men's team	July 2
Silver	Adam Gunn	Athletics	Men's all-around	July 4
Silver	St. Louis Amateur Athletic Association: J. W. Dowling; W. R. Gibson; Hugh Grogan; Tom Hunter; Albert Lehman; William Murphy; William Partridge; George Passmore; William T. Passmore; W. J. Ross; Jack Sullivan; Albert Venn; A. M. Woods	Lacrosse		July 7
Silver	James Juvenal	Rowing	Men's single sculls	July 30
Silver	John Mulcahy; William Varley	Rowing	Men's coxless pair	July 30
Silver	John Hoben; Joseph McLoughlin	Rowing	Men's double sculls	July 30
Silver	Charles Aman; Michael Begley; Martin Formanack; Frederick Suerig	Rowing	Men's coxless four	July 30
Silver	Teddy Billington	Cycling	1/2 mile	August 2
Silver	Burton Downing	Cycling	1/4 mile	August 3
Silver	Oscar Goerke	Cycling	2 miles	August 3
Silver	Burton Downing	Cycling	1/3 mile	August 5
Silver	Burton Downing	Cycling	1 mile	August 5
Silver	George E. Wiley	Cycling	5 miles	August 5
Silver	Arthur F. Andrews	Cycling	25 miles	August 5
Silver	Smith Streeter	Roque		August 8
Silver	Charles King	Athletics	Men's standing long jump	August 29
Silver	John DeWitt	Athletics	Men's hammer throw	August 29
Silver	William Hogenson	Athletics	Men's 60 m	August 29
Silver	Garrett Serviss	Athletics	Men's high jump	August 29
Silver	Frank Waller	Athletics	Men's 400 m	August 29
Silver	Albert Corey (FRA)	Athletics	Men's marathon	August 30
Silver	Nathaniel Cartmell	Athletics	Men's 200 m	August 31
Silver	Joseph Stadler	Athletics	Men's standing high jump	August 31
Silver	Wesley Coe	Athletics	Men's shot put	August 31
Silver	Frank Waller	Athletics	Men's 400 m hurdles	August 31
Silver	Howard Valentine	Athletics	Men's 800 m	September 1
Silver	Frank Castleman	Athletics	Men's 200 m hurdles	September 1
Silver	Daniel Frank	Athletics	Men's long jump	September 1
Silver	Fred Englehardt	Athletics	Men's triple jump	September 1
Silver	John Flanagan	Athletics	Men's 56 lb weight throw	September 1
Silver	Max Braun; August Rodenberg; Charles Rose; William Seiling; Orrin Upshaw	Tug of war		September 1
Silver	Nathaniel Cartmell	Athletics	Men's 100 m	September 3
Silver	Frank Verner	Athletics	Men's 1500 m	September 3
Silver	Thaddeus Shideler	Athletics	Men's 110 m hurdles	September 3
Silver	LeRoy Samse	Athletics	Men's pole vault	September 3
Silver	Charles King	Athletics	Men's standing triple jump	September 3
Silver	Ralph Rose	Athletics	Men's discus throw	September 3
Silver	Albert Corey (FRA); Lacey Hearn; Sidney Hatch; James Lightbody; Frank Verner	Athletics	Men's 4 miles team race	September 3
Silver	Robert LeRoy	Tennis	Men's singles	September 3
Silver	Alphonzo Bell; Robert LeRoy	Tennis	Men's doubles	September 3
Silver	Frederick Winters	Weightlifting	Men's all-around dumbbell	September 3
Silver	Oscar Osthoff	Weightlifting	Men's two hand lift	September 3
Silver	Edgar Adams	Diving	Plunge for distance	September 5
Silver	Charles Daniels	Swimming	Men's 100 yd freestyle	September 5
Silver	Scott Leary	Swimming	Men's 50 yd freestyle	September 6
Silver	Francis Gailey (AUS)	Swimming	Men's 220 yard freestyle	September 6
Silver	Francis Gailey (AUS)	Swimming	Men's 440 yard freestyle	September 7
Silver	Francis Gailey (AUS)	Swimming	Men's 880 yard freestyle	September 7
Silver	Rex Beach; David Hammond; Charles Healy; Frank Kehoe; Jerome Steever; Edwin Swatek; Bill Tuttle	Water polo		September 6
Silver	Charles Tatham	Fencing	Men's épée	September 7
Silver	Albertson Van Zo Post	Fencing	Men's foil	September 7
Silver	Arthur Fox; Charles Tatham; Charles Townsend	Fencing	Men's team foil	September 7
Silver	Hugo Goetz; David Hammond; Raymond Thorne; Bill Tuttle	Swimming	Men's 4 x 50 yd freestyle relay	September 7
Silver	William Grebe	Fencing	Men's sabre	September 8
Silver	William O'Connor	Fencing	Men's singlestick	September 8
Silver	John Cady; Albert Bond Lambert; John Maxwell; Burt McKinnie; Ralph McKittrick; Francis Newton; Henry Potter; Frederick Semple; Stuart Stickney; William Stickney	Golf	Men's team	September 17
Silver	Robert Williams	Archery	Men's double American round	September 19
Silver	Emma Cooke	Archery	Women's double Columbia round	September 19
Silver	Robert Williams	Archery	Men's double York round	September 20
Silver	Emma Cooke	Archery	Women's double National round	September 20
Silver	William Clark; Samuel Duvall; Charles Hubbard; Charles Woodruff	Archery	Men's team round	September 21
Silver	Miles Burke	Boxing	Flyweight	September 22
Silver	George Finnegan	Boxing	Bantamweight	September 22
Silver	Frank Haller	Boxing	Featherweight	September 22
Silver	Russell van Horn	Boxing	Lightweight	September 22
Silver	Harry Spanjer	Boxing	Welterweight	September 22
Silver	Benjamin Spradley	Boxing	Middleweight	September 22
Silver	Charles Mayer	Boxing	Heavyweight	September 22
Silver	Chandler Egan	Golf	Men's individual	September 24
Silver	John Hein	Wrestling	Men's freestyle light flyweight	October 15
Silver	Gustave Bauer	Wrestling	Men's freestyle flyweight	October 15
Silver	August Wester	Wrestling	Men's freestyle bantamweight	October 15
Silver	Theodore McLear	Wrestling	Men's freestyle featherweight	October 15
Silver	Rudolph Tesing	Wrestling	Men's freestyle lightweight	October 15
Silver	William Beckman	Wrestling	Men's freestyle welterweight	October 15
Silver	Frank Kugler (GER)	Wrestling	Men's freestyle heavyweight	October 15
Silver	George Eyser	Gymnastics	Men's combined	October 28
Silver	George Eyser	Gymnastics	Men's pommel horse	October 28
Silver	Anton Heida	Gymnastics	Men's parallel bars	October 28
Silver	William Merz	Gymnastics	Men's club swinging	October 28
Silver	William Merz	Gymnastics	Men's rings	October 28
Silver	Charles Krause	Gymnastics	Men's rope climbing	October 28
Silver	Christian Brothers College High School: Charles Bartliff; Warren Brittingham; Oscar Brockmeyer; Alexander Cudmore; Charles January; John January; Thomas January; Raymond Lawler; Joe Lydon; Louis Menges; Peter Ratican	Football		November 23
Bronze	Gustav Tiefenthaler (SUI)	Wrestling	Men's freestyle light flyweight	July 2
Bronze	William Merz	Athletics	Men's triathlon	July 2
Bronze	John Duha; Charles Krause; George Mayer; Robert Maysack; Philip Schuster; Edward Siegler	Gymnastics	Men's team	July 2
Bronze	Truxtun Hare	Athletics	Men's all-around	July 4
Bronze	Constance Titus	Rowing	Men's single sculls	July 30
Bronze	John Joachim; Joseph Buerger	Rowing	Men's coxless pair	July 30
Bronze	Joseph Ravannack; John Wells	Rowing	Men's double sculls	July 30
Bronze	Frank Dummerth; John Freitag; Lou Heim; Gus Voerg	Rowing	Men's coxless four	July 30
Bronze	Burton Downing	Cycling	1/2 mile	August 2
Bronze	Teddy Billington	Cycling	1/4 mile	August 3
Bronze	Marcus Hurley	Cycling	2 miles	August 3
Bronze	Teddy Billington	Cycling	1/3 mile	August 5
Bronze	Teddy Billington	Cycling	1 mile	August 5
Bronze	Arthur F. Andrews	Cycling	5 miles	August 5
Bronze	George E. Wiley	Cycling	25 miles	August 5
Bronze	Charles Brown	Roque		August 8
Bronze	Arthur L. Newton	Athletics	Men's 2590 m steeplechase	August 29
Bronze	Herman Groman	Athletics	Men's 400 m	August 29
Bronze	Fay Moulton	Athletics	Men's 60 m	August 29
Bronze	John Biller	Athletics	Men's standing long jump	August 29
Bronze	Ralph Rose	Athletics	Men's hammer throw	August 29
Bronze	Arthur L. Newton	Athletics	Men's marathon	August 30
Bronze	William Hogenson	Athletics	Men's 200 m	August 31
Bronze	George Poage	Athletics	Men's 400 m hurdles	August 31
Bronze	Lawson Robertson	Athletics	Men's standing high jump	August 31
Bronze	Lawrence Feuerbach	Athletics	Men's shot put	August 31
Bronze	Frank Kugler (GER)	Weightlifting	Men's two hand lift	August 31
Bronze	Emil Breitkreutz	Athletics	Men's 800 m	September 1
Bronze	George Poage	Athletics	Men's 200 m hurdles	September 1
Bronze	Robert Stangland	Athletics	Men's long jump	September 1
Bronze	Robert Stangland	Athletics	Men's triple jump	September 1
Bronze	James Mitchel	Athletics	Men's 56 lb weight throw	September 1
Bronze	Henry Seiling; Oscar Friede; Charles Haberkorn; Harry Jacobs; Frank Kugler (GER); Charles Thias	Tug of war		September 1
Bronze	Louis Wilkins	Athletics	Men's pole vault	September 3
Bronze	Joseph Stadler	Athletics	Men's standing triple jump	September 3
Bronze	William Hogenson	Athletics	Men's 100 m	September 3
Bronze	Lacey Hearn	Athletics	Men's 1500 m	September 3
Bronze	Lesley Ashburner	Athletics	Men's 110 m hurdles	September 3
Bronze	Alphonzo Bell	Tennis	Men's singles	September 3
Bronze	Edgar Leonard	Tennis	Men's singles	September 3
Bronze	Clarence Gamble; Arthur Wear	Tennis	Men's doubles	September 3
Bronze	Joseph Wear; Allen West	Tennis	Men's doubles	September 3
Bronze	Frank Kugler (GER)	Weightlifting	Men's all-around dumbbell	September 3
Bronze	Leo Goodwin	Diving	Plunge for distance	September 5
Bronze	Scott Leary	Swimming	Men's 100 yd freestyle	September 5
Bronze	Francis Gailey (AUS)	Swimming	Men's 1 mile freestyle	September 5
Bronze	Charles Daniels	Swimming	Men's 50 yd freestyle	September 6
Bronze	Gwynne Evans; Augustus Goessling; John Meyers; Bill Orthwein; Amedee Reyburn; Fred Schreiner; Manfred Toeppen	Water polo		September 6
Bronze	Frank Kehoe	Diving	Platform	September 7
Bronze	Albertson Van Zo Post	Fencing	Men's épée	September 7
Bronze	Charles Tatham	Fencing	Men's foil	September 7
Bronze	Otto Wahle (AUT)	Swimming	Men's 440 yard freestyle	September 7
Bronze	Jam Handy	Swimming	Men's 440 yd breaststroke	September 7
Bronze	Gwynne Evans; Bill Orthwein; Amedee Reyburn; Marquard Schwarz	Swimming	Men's 4 x 50 yd freestyle relay	September 7
Bronze	Albertson Van Zo Post	Fencing	Men's sabre	September 8
Bronze	William Grebe	Fencing	Men's singlestick	September 8
Bronze	Douglass Cadwallader; Jesse Carleton; Harold Fraser; Arthur Hussey; Orus Jones; Allan Lard; George Oliver; Simeon Price; John Rahm; Harold Weber	Golf	Men's team	September 17
Bronze	William Thompson	Archery	Men's double American round	September 19
Bronze	Eliza Pollock	Archery	Women's double Columbia round	September 19
Bronze	Eliza Pollock	Archery	Women's double National round	September 20
Bronze	William Thompson	Archery	Men's double York round	September 20
Bronze	George Bryant; Wallace Bryant; Cyrus Edwin Dallin; Henry B. Richardson	Archery	Men's team round	September 21
Bronze	Frederick Gilmore	Boxing	Featherweight	September 22
Bronze	Peter Sturholdt	Boxing	Lightweight	September 22
Bronze	Joe Lydon	Boxing	Welterweight	September 22
Bronze	William Michaels	Boxing	Heavyweight	September 22
Bronze	Burt McKinnie	Golf	Men's individual	September 24
Bronze	Francis Newton	Golf	Men's individual	September 24
Bronze	William Nelson	Wrestling	Men's freestyle flyweight	October 15
Bronze	Louis Strebler	Wrestling	Men's freestyle bantamweight	October 15
Bronze	Charles Clapper	Wrestling	Men's freestyle featherweight	October 15
Bronze	Albert Zirkel	Wrestling	Men's freestyle lightweight	October 15
Bronze	Jerry Winholtz	Wrestling	Men's freestyle welterweight	October 15
Bronze	Fred Warmbold	Wrestling	Men's freestyle heavyweight	October 15
Bronze	William Merz	Gymnastics	Men's combined	October 28
Bronze	William Merz	Gymnastics	Men's pommel horse	October 28
Bronze	William Merz	Gymnastics	Men's vault	October 28
Bronze	George Eyser	Gymnastics	Men's horizontal bar	October 28
Bronze	John Duha	Gymnastics	Men's parallel bars	October 28
Bronze	Ralph Wilson	Gymnastics	Men's club swinging	October 28
Bronze	Emil Voigt	Gymnastics	Men's rings	October 28
Bronze	Emil Voigt	Gymnastics	Men's rope climbing	October 28
Bronze	St. Rose Parish: Joseph Brady; George Cooke; Thomas Cooke; Cormic Cosgrove; Edward Dierkes; Martin Dooling; Frank Frost; Claude Jameson; Henry Jameson; Johnson; Leo O'Connell; Harry Tate	Football		November 23

== Results by event ==
=== Archery ===
The United States first competed in archery at the 1904 Summer Olympics.

Event	Place	Archer	Score
Men's double York round	1st	George Bryant	820
Men's double York round	2nd	Robert Williams	819
Men's double York round	3rd	William Thompson	816
Men's double York round	4th	Wallace Bryant	618
Men's double York round	5th	Benjamin Keys	532
Men's double York round	6th	Edward Frentz	528
Men's double York round	7th	Homer Taylor	506
Men's double York round	8th	C.S. Woodruff	487
Men's double York round	9th	Henry B. Richardson	439
Men's double York round	10th	David McGowan	383
Men's double York round	11th	Thomas Scott	375
Men's double York round	12th	Cyrus Dallin	355
Men's double York round	13th	Lewis Maxon	341
Men's double York round	14th	Ralph Taylor	328
Men's double York round	15th	Edward Weston	268
Men's double York round	16th	Edward Bruce	238
Men's double American round	1st	George Bryant	1048
Men's double American round	2nd	Robert Williams	991
Men's double American round	3rd	William Thompson	949
Men's double American round	4th	C.S. Woodruff	907
Men's double American round	5th	William Clark	880
Men's double American round	6th	Homer Taylor	862
Men's double American round	7th	Benjamin Keys	840
Men's double American round	8th	Wallace Bryant	818
Men's double American round	9th	Cyrus Dallin	816
Men's double American round	10th	Henry B. Richardson	813
Men's double American round	11th	Charles Hubbard	779
Men's double American round	12th	Lewis Maxon	777
Men's double American round	13th	Galen Spencer	701
Men's double American round	14th	Samuel Duvall	699
Men's double American round	15th	Edward Frentz	665
Men's double American round	16th	Amos Casselman	628
Men's double American round	17th	Ralph Taylor	533
Men's double American round	18th	Edward Bruce	516
Men's double American round	19th	Edward H. Weston	508
Men's double American round	20th	Edward Weston	450
Men's double American round	21st	W. G. Valentine	347
Women's double National round	1st	Matilda Howell	620
Women's double National round	2nd	Emma Cooke	419
Women's double National round	3rd	Jessie Pollock	419
Women's double National round	4th	Laura Woodruff	234
Women's double National round	5th	Mabel Taylor	160
Women's double National round	6th	Louise Taylor	159
Women's double Columbia round	1st	Matilda Howell	867
Women's double Columbia round	2nd	Emma Cooke	630
Women's double Columbia round	3rd	Jessie Pollock	630
Women's double Columbia round	4th	Laura Woodruff	547
Women's double Columbia round	5th	Mabel Taylor	243
Women's double Columbia round	6th	Louise Taylor	229

Event	Place	Team	Archers	Score
Men's team round	1st	Potomac Archers	William Thompson, Robert Williams, Lewis Maxon, Galen Spencer	1344
Men's team round	2nd	Cincinnati Archers	C.S. Woodruff, William Clark, Charles Hubbard, Samuel Duvall	1341
Men's team round	3rd	Boston Archers	George Bryant, Wallace Bryant, Cyrus Dallin, Henry B. Richardson	1268
Men's team round	4th	Chicago Archers	Benjamin Keys, Homer Taylor, Edward Weston, Edward Bruce	942
Women's team round	1st		Matilda Howell, Jessie Pollock, Laura Woodruff, Louise Taylor	Unknown
Women's team round	-		Emma Cooke, Mabel Taylor	Did not participate

=== Athletics ===
==== Running ====
Event	Place	Athlete	Heats	Repechage	Final
Men's 60 metres	1st	Archie Hahn	7.2 seconds 1st, heat 3	Advanced directly	7.0 seconds
Men's 60 metres	2nd	William Hogenson	7.0 seconds 1st, heat 2	Advanced directly	7.2 seconds
Men's 60 metres	3rd	Fay Moulton	Unknown; 1st, heat 4	Advanced directly	7.2 seconds
Men's 60 metres	4th	Clyde Blair	7.0 seconds 1st, heat 1	Advanced directly	7.2 seconds
Men's 60 metres	5th	Myer Prinstein	Unknown; 2nd, heat 1	7.2 seconds 2nd, repechage	Unknown
Men's 60 metres	6th	Frank Castleman	Unknown; 2nd, heat 2	7.2 seconds 1st, repechage	Unknown
Men's 60 metres	7-8	Nathaniel Cartmell	Unknown; 2nd, heat 4	Unknown; 3-4, repechage	Did not advance
Men's 60 metres	9-12	William Hunter	Unknown; 3-4, heat 1	did not advance	
Men's 60 metres	9-12	George Poage	Unknown; 3-4, heat 1	did not advance	
Men's 60 metres	9-12	Lawson Robertson	Unknown; 3rd, heat 3	did not advance	

Event	Place	Athlete	Heats	Final
Men's 100 metres	1st	Archie Hahn	11.4 seconds 1st, heat 1	11.0 seconds
Men's 100 metres	2nd	Nathaniel Cartmell	11.4 seconds 1st, heat 3	11.2 seconds
Men's 100 metres	3rd	William Hogenson	11.6 seconds 1st, heat 2	11.2 seconds
Men's 100 metres	4th	Fay Moulton	Unknown; 2nd, heat 3	Unknown
Men's 100 metres	5th	Frederick Heckwolf	Unknown; 2nd, heat 2	Unknown
Men's 100 metres	6th	Lawson Robertson	Unknown; 2nd, heat 1	Unknown
Men's 100 metres	7-11	Clyde Blair	Unknown; 3rd, heat 3	Did not advance
Men's 100 metres	7-11	Frank Castleman	Unknown; 4th, heat 3	Did not advance
Men's 100 metres	7-11	Myer Prinstein	Unknown; 4th, heat 2	Did not advance
Men's 200 metres	1st	Archie Hahn	22.2 seconds 1st, heat 1	21.6 seconds OR
Men's 200 metres	2nd	Nathaniel Cartmell	Unknown; 2nd, heat 1	21.9 seconds
Men's 200 metres	3rd	William Hogenson	22.8 seconds 1st, heat 2	Unknown
Men's 200 metres	4th	Fay Moulton	Unknown; 2nd, heat 2	Unknown

Event	Place	Athlete	Final
Men's 400 metres	1st	Harry Hillman	49.2 seconds OR
Men's 400 metres	2nd	Frank Waller	49.9 seconds
Men's 400 metres	3rd	Herman Groman	50.0 seconds
Men's 400 metres	4th	Joseph Fleming	Unknown
Men's 400 metres	5th	Myer Prinstein	Unknown
Men's 400 metres	6th	George Poage	Unknown
Men's 400 metres	7-12	Clyde Blair	Unknown
Men's 400 metres	7-12	Paul Pilgrim	Unknown
Men's 400 metres	7-12	George Underwood	Unknown
Men's 400 metres	7-12	Howard Valentine	Unknown
Men's 800 metres	1st	James Lightbody	1:56.0 OR
Men's 800 metres	2nd	Howard Valentine	1:56.3
Men's 800 metres	3rd	Emil Breitkreutz	1:56.4
Men's 800 metres	4th	George Underwood	Unknown
Men's 800 metres	6th	Frank Verner	Unknown
Men's 800 metres	7-13	George Bonhag	Unknown
Men's 800 metres	7-13	Harvey Cohn	Unknown
Men's 800 metres	7-13	Lacey Hearn	Unknown
Men's 800 metres	7-13	John J. Joyce	Unknown
Men's 800 metres	7-13	Paul Pilgrim	Unknown
Men's 1500 metres	1st	James Lightbody	4:05.4 OR
Men's 1500 metres	2nd	Frank Verner	4:06.8
Men's 1500 metres	3rd	Lacey Hearn	Unknown
Men's 1500 metres	4th	David Munson	Unknown
Men's 1500 metres	7th	Howard Valentine	Unknown
Men's 1500 metres	8th	Harvey Cohn	Unknown
Men's 1500 metres	9th	Charles Bacon	Unknown

Event	Place	Athlete	Heats	Final
Men's 110 metre hurdles	1st	Fred Schule	16.2 seconds 1st, heat 1	16.0 seconds
Men's 110 metre hurdles	2nd	Thaddeus Schideler	Unknown; 2nd, heat 2	16.3 seconds
Men's 110 metre hurdles	3rd	Lesley Ashburner	Unknown; 2nd, heat 1	16.4 seconds
Men's 110 metre hurdles	4th	Frank Castleman	16.2 seconds 1st, heat 2	Unknown
Men's 110 metre hurdles	5-7	Craig McLanahan	Unknown; 3rd, heat 1	Unknown

Event	Place	Athlete	Final
Men's 200 metre hurdles	1st	Harry Hillman	24.6 seconds OR
Men's 200 metre hurdles	2nd	Frank Castleman	24.9 seconds
Men's 200 metre hurdles	3rd	George Poage	Unknown
Men's 200 metre hurdles	4th	George Varnell	Unknown
Men's 200 metre hurdles	5th	Fred Schule	Unknown
Men's 400 metre hurdles	1st	Harry Hillman	53.0 seconds
Men's 400 metre hurdles	2nd	Frank Waller	53.2 seconds
Men's 400 metre hurdles	3rd	George Poage	Unknown
Men's 400 metre hurdles	4th	George Varnell	Unknown
Men's 2590 metre steeplechase	1st	James Lightbody	7:39.6
Men's 2590 metre steeplechase	3rd	Arthur Newton	Unknown
Men's 2590 metre steeplechase	4th	Frank Verner	Unknown
Men's 2590 metre steeplechase	5-7	Harvey Cohn	Unknown
Men's 2590 metre steeplechase	5-7	David Munson	Unknown
Men's 2590 metre steeplechase	5-7	Richard Sanford	Unknown

Event	Place	Team	Athletes	Score
Men's 4 mile team race	1st	New York AC	Arthur Newton (1); George Underwood (5); Paul Pilgrim (6); Howard Valentine (7); David Munson (8)	27 points
Men's 4 mile team race	2nd	Chicago AA	James Lightbody (2); Frank Verner (3); Lacey Hearn (4); Albert Corey (FRA) (9); Sidney Hatch (10)	28 points

Event	Place	Athlete	Final
Men's marathon	1st	Thomas Hicks	3:28:53
Men's marathon	2nd	Albert Corey (FRA)	3:34:52
Men's marathon	3rd	Arthur Newton	3:47:33
Men's marathon	6th	David Kneeland	Unknown
Men's marathon	7th	Harry Brawley	Unknown
Men's marathon	8th	Sidney Hatch	Unknown
Men's marathon	11th	F. P. Devlin	Unknown
Men's marathon	13th	John Furla	Unknown
Men's marathon	—	Edward P. Carr	Did not finish
Men's marathon	—	Robert Fowler	Did not finish
Men's marathon	—	John Foy	Did not finish
Men's marathon	—	William Garcia	Did not finish
Men's marathon	—	Thomas J. Kennedy	Did not finish
Men's marathon	—	John Lordon	Did not finish
Men's marathon	—	Samuel Mellor	Did not finish
Men's marathon	—	Frank Pierce	Did not finish
Men's marathon	—	Guy Porter	Did not finish
Men's marathon	—	Michael Spring	Did not finish
Men's marathon	—	Frederick Lorz	Disqualified

==== Jumping ====
Event	Place	Athlete	Final
Men's long jump	1st	Myer Prinstein	7.34 metres OR
Men's long jump	2nd	Daniel Frank	6.89 metres
Men's long jump	3rd	Robert Stangland	6.88 metres
Men's long jump	4th	Fred Englehardt	6.63 metres
Men's long jump	5th	Gilbert Van Cleve	Unknown
Men's long jump	6th	John Hagerman	Unknown
Men's long jump	7-10	John T. Oxley	Unknown
Men's triple jump	1st	Myer Prinstein	14.35 metres
Men's triple jump	2nd	Fred Englehardt	13.90 metres
Men's triple jump	3rd	Robert Stangland	13.36 metres
Men's triple jump	4th	John Fuhrer	12.91 metres
Men's triple jump	5th	Gilbert Van Cleve	Unknown
Men's triple jump	6th	John Hagerman	Unknown
Men's triple jump	7th	Samuel Jones	Unknown
Men's high jump	1st	Samuel Jones	1.80 metres
Men's high jump	2nd	Garrett Serviss	1.77 metres
Men's high jump	5th	Emil Freymark	Unknown
Men's high jump	6th	Ervin Barker	1.70 metres
Men's pole vault	1st	Charles Dvorak	3.50 metres OR
Men's pole vault	2nd	LeRoy Samse	3.35 metres
Men's pole vault	3rd	Louis Wilkins	3.35 metres
Men's pole vault	4th	Craig McLanahan	3.35 metres
Men's pole vault	5th	Claude Allen	3.35 metres
Men's pole vault	6th	Walter Dray	Unknown
Men's standing long jump	1st	Ray Ewry	3.47 metres OR
Men's standing long jump	2nd	Charles King	3.27 metres
Men's standing long jump	3rd	John Biller	3.25 metres
Men's standing long jump	4th	Henry Field	3.18 metres
Men's standing triple jump	1st	Ray Ewry	10.54 metres
Men's standing triple jump	2nd	Charles King	10.16 metres
Men's standing triple jump	3rd	Joseph Stadler	9.60 metres
Men's standing triple jump	4th	Garrett Serviss	9.53 metres
Men's standing high jump	1st	Ray Ewry	1.60 metres
Men's standing high jump	2nd	Joseph Stadler	1.44 metres
Men's standing high jump	3rd	Lawson Robertson	1.44 metres
Men's standing high jump	4th	John Biller	1.42 metres

==== Throwing ====
Event	Place	Athlete	Final
Men's shot put	1st	Ralph Rose	14.81 metres OR
Men's shot put	2nd	Wesley Coe	14.40 metres
Men's shot put	3rd	Lawrence Feuerbach	13.37 metres
Men's shot put	4th	Martin Sheridan	12.39 metres
Men's shot put	5th	Charles Chadwick	Unknown
Men's shot put	6th	Albert Johnson	Unknown
Men's shot put	7th	John Guiney	Unknown
Men's discus throw	1st	Martin Sheridan	39.28 metres OR
Men's discus throw	2nd	Ralph Rose	39.28 metres OR
Men's discus throw	4th	John Flanagan	36.14 metres
Men's discus throw	5th	John Biller	Unknown
Men's discus throw	6th	James Mitchell	Unknown
Men's hammer throw	1st	John Flanagan	51.23 metres OR
Men's hammer throw	2nd	John DeWitt	50.26 metres
Men's hammer throw	3rd	Ralph Rose	45.73 metres
Men's hammer throw	4th	Charles Chadwick	42.78 metres
Men's hammer throw	5th	James Mitchell	Unknown
Men's hammer throw	6th	Albert Johnson	Unknown
Men's 56 pound weight throw	2nd	John Flanagan	10.16 metres
Men's 56 pound weight throw	3rd	James Mitchell	10.13 metres
Men's 56 pound weight throw	4th	Charles Henneman	9.18 metres
Men's 56 pound weight throw	5th	Charles Chadwick	Unknown
Men's 56 pound weight throw	6th	Ralph Rose	8.53 metres

==== Multi-event competitions ====
Event	Place	Athlete	Total score
Men's triathlon	1st	Max Emmerich	35.7
Men's triathlon	2nd	John Grieb	34.0
Men's triathlon	3rd	William Merz	32.9
Men's triathlon	4th	George Mayer	32.4
Men's triathlon	5th	John Bissinger	30.8
Men's triathlon	6th	Philip Kassel	30.1
Men's triathlon	7th	Fred Schmind	30.0
Men's triathlon	10th	Max Hess	29.6
Men's triathlon	10th	Otto Neimand	29.6
Men's triathlon	12th	Edward Siegler	29.2
Men's triathlon	13th	John Leichinger	29.1
Men's triathlon	14th	Otto Boehnke	28.7
Men's triathlon	14th	George Stapf	28.7
Men's triathlon	16th	Andrew Neu	28.6
Men's triathlon	17th	Bob Reynolds	28.5
Men's triathlon	17th	Frank Schicke	28.5
Men's triathlon	19th	Ernst Reckeweg	28.2
Men's triathlon	20th	Otto Steffen	28.0
Men's triathlon	22nd	Ragnar Berg	27.4
Men's triathlon	22nd	Lorenz Spann	27.4
Men's triathlon	22nd	Reinhard Wagner	27.4
Men's triathlon	25th	Theodore Gross	27.3
Men's triathlon	25th	Robert Herrmann	27.3
Men's triathlon	25th	Leander Keim	27.3
Men's triathlon	28th	Oluf Landnes	27.2
Men's triathlon	30th	William Berewald	27.0
Men's triathlon	30th	Willard Schrader	27.0
Men's triathlon	32nd	Julius Lenhart (AUT)	26.8
Men's triathlon	33rd	Henry Koeder	26.7
Men's triathlon	34th	Max Thomas	26.6
Men's triathlon	36th	Emil Beyer	26.5
Men's triathlon	36th	John Duha	26.5
Men's triathlon	36th	Edward Hennig	26.5
Men's triathlon	36th	Clarence Kiddington	26.5
Men's triathlon	40th	Anthony Jahnke	26.4
Men's triathlon	40th	Oliver Olsen	26.4
Men's triathlon	40th	Henry Prinzler	26.4
Men's triathlon	43rd	Phillip Sontag	26.2
Men's triathlon	44th	Louis Hunger	25.9
Men's triathlon	44th	Louis Kniep	25.9
Men's triathlon	47th	Charles Umbs	25.7
Men's triathlon	47th	John Wolf	25.7
Men's triathlon	49th	George Aschenbrener	25.5
Men's triathlon	49th	Rudolf Krupitzer	25.5
Men's triathlon	49th	J. Wassow	25.5
Men's triathlon	52nd	Emil Rothe	25.4
Men's triathlon	52nd	George Schroeder	25.4
Men's triathlon	54.	Otto Feyder	25.2
Men's triathlon	55th	Louis Rathke	25.1
Men's triathlon	55th	Philip Schuster	25.1
Men's triathlon	55th	Harry Warnken	25.1
Men's triathlon	59th	Anton Heida	25.0
Men's triathlon	59th	Jacob Hertenbahn	25.0
Men's triathlon	59th	William Tritschler	25.0
Men's triathlon	62nd	Harry Hansen	24.8
Men's triathlon	63rd	Max Wolf	24.6
Men's triathlon	64th	William Andelfinger	24.5
Men's triathlon	64th	Charles Krause	24.5
Men's triathlon	67.	Bergin Nilsen	24.4
Men's triathlon	68th	James Dwyer	24.3
Men's triathlon	68th	William Traband	24.3
Men's triathlon	70th	Robert Maysack	24.2
Men's triathlon	71st	George Mastrovich	24.1
Men's triathlon	72nd	Charles Sorum	24.0
Men's triathlon	73rd	Bernard Berg	23.9
Men's triathlon	74th	John Dellert	23.7
Men's triathlon	75th	Andreas Kempf	23.6
Men's triathlon	75th	Otto Thomsen	23.6
Men's triathlon	77th	Christian Deubler	23.5
Men's triathlon	77th	Edward Tritschler	23.5
Men's triathlon	79th	Ben Chimberoff	23.4
Men's triathlon	79th	Henry Kraft	23.4
Men's triathlon	81st	L. Guerner	23.2
Men's triathlon	82nd	P. Gussmann	23.1
Men's triathlon	83rd	Michael Lang	23.0
Men's triathlon	84th	P. Ritter	22.8
Men's triathlon	85th	Hy. Meyland	22.4
Men's triathlon	85th	Richard Tritschler	22.4
Men's triathlon	85th	Emil Voigt	22.4
Men's triathlon	88th	Otto Knerr	22.3
Men's triathlon	89th	Gustav Mueller	22.0
Men's triathlon	89th	Otto Roissner	22.0
Men's triathlon	91st	William Horschke	21.7
Men's triathlon	92nd	Frank Raab	21.5
Men's triathlon	92nd	Wilhelm Zabel	21.5
Men's triathlon	94th	Max Rascher	21.4
Men's triathlon	95th	William Kruppinger	21.3
Men's triathlon	95th	August Placke	21.3
Men's triathlon	95th	Rudolf Schrader	21.3
Men's triathlon	95th	Emil Schwegler	21.3
Men's triathlon	95th	Christian Sperl	21.3
Men's triathlon	100th	Martin Fischer	21.2
Men's triathlon	100th	Julian Schmitz	21.2
Men's triathlon	102nd	William Herzog	21.1
Men's triathlon	102nd	Arthur Rosenkampff	21.1
Men's triathlon	104th	Gustav Hämmerlin	20.9
Men's triathlon	104th	Paul Studen	20.9
Men's triathlon	106th	Martin Ludwig	20.4
Men's triathlon	107th	Charles Dellert	20.3
Men's triathlon	108th	John Miesel	20.2
Men's triathlon	108th	Walter Real	20.2
Men's triathlon	108th	Arthur Sundbye	20.2
Men's triathlon	111th	M. Barry	20.1
Men's triathlon	112th	K. Woerner	19.7
Men's triathlon	113th	Edward Pueschell	19.3
Men's triathlon	114th	Charles Schwartz	19.1
Men's triathlon	115th	Curt Roedel	19.0
Men's triathlon	116th	Alvin Kritschmann	18.9
Men's triathlon	117th	William Friedrich	17.7
Men's triathlon	118th	George Eyser	13.5
Men's all-around	2nd	Adam Gunn	5907
Men's all-around	3rd	Truxtun Hare	5813
Men's all-around	5th	Ellery Clark	2778
Men's all-around	6th	John Grieb	2199
Men's all-around	7th	Max Emmerich	0

=== Boxing ===
The United States first competed in boxing in 1904. The sport made its Olympic debut that year.

Jack Egan originally won the silver medal in the lightweight competition and the bronze medal in the welterweight competition. Later, it was discovered that his real name was Frank Joseph Floyd, whereas AAU rules made it illegal to fight under an assumed name. In November 1905, the AAU disqualified Egan from all AAU competitions and ordered him to return all his prizes and medals. Russell van Horn was awarded the silver and Peter Sturholdt awarded the bronze in the lightweight competition, while Joseph Lydon retained bronze in the welterweight competition.

Event	Place	Boxer	Quarterfinals	Semifinals	Final
Flyweight	1st	George Finnegan	None held		Defeated Miles Burke
Flyweight	2nd	Miles Burke	None held		Lost to George Finnegan
Bantamweight	1st	Oliver Kirk	None held		Defeated George Finnegan
Bantamweight	2nd	George Finnegan	None held		Lost to Oliver Kirk
Featherweight	1st	Oliver Kirk	None held	Bye	Defeated Frank Haller
Featherweight	2nd	Frank Haller	None held	Defeated Frederick Gilmore	Lost to Oliver Kirk
Featherweight	3rd	Frederick Gilmore	None held	Lost to Frank Haller	Did not advance
Lightweight	1st	Harry Spanjer	Defeated Kenneth Jewett	Defeated Russell van Horn	Jack Egan disqualified
Lightweight	—	Jack Egan	Defeated Joseph Lydon	Defeated Peter Sturholdt	Disqualified
Lightweight	2nd	Russell van Horn	Defeated Arthur Seward	Lost to Harry Spanjer	Defeated Peter Sturholdt
Lightweight	3rd	Peter Sturholdt	Carroll Burton disqualified	Lost to Jack Egan	Lost to Russell van Horn
Lightweight	—	Kenneth Jewett	Lost to Harry Spanjer	Did not advance	
Lightweight	—	Joseph Lydon	Lost to Jack Egan	Did not advance	
Lightweight	—	Arthur Seward	Lost to Russell van Horn	Did not advance	
Lightweight	—	Carroll Burton	Disqualified	Did not advance	
Welterweight	1st	Albert Young	None held	Defeated Jack Egan	Defeated Harry Spanjer
Welterweight	2nd	Harry Spanjer	None held	Defeated Joseph Lydon	Lost to Albert Young
Welterweight	—	Jack Egan	None held	Lost to Albert Young	Disqualified
Welterweight	3rd	Joseph Lydon	None held	Lost to Harry Spanjer	No bronze medal match
Middleweight	1st	Charles Mayer	None held		Defeated Benjamin Spradley
Middleweight	2nd	Benjamin Spradley	None held		Lost to Charles Mayer
Heavyweight	1st	Samuel Berger	None held	Defeated William Michaels	Defeated Charles Mayer
Heavyweight	2nd	Charles Mayer	None held	Bye	Lost to Samuel Berger
Heavyweight	3rd	William Michaels	None held	Lost to Samuel Berger	Did not advance

=== Cycling ===
The United States competed in cycling.

Event	Place	Cyclist	Heats	Semifinals	Final
1/4 mile	1st	Marcus Hurley	35.6 seconds 1st, heat 2	34.8 seconds 1st, semifinal 1	31.8 seconds
1/4 mile	2nd	Burton Downing	35.2 seconds 1st, heat 4	Unknown; 2nd, semifinal 2	Unknown
1/4 mile	3rd	Teddy Billington	36.2 seconds 1st, heat 1	Unknown; 2nd, semifinal 1	Unknown
1/4 mile	4th	Oscar Goerke	34.8 seconds 1st, heat 3	33.4 seconds 1st, semifinal 2	Unknown
1/4 mile	5-8	Arthur F. Andrews	Unknown; 2nd, heat 3	Unknown; 3-4, semifinal 2	Did not advance
1/4 mile	5-8	Frank Bizzoni	Unknown; 2nd, heat 1	Unknown; 3-4, semifinal 1	Did not advance
1/4 mile	5-8	Frank Montaldi	Unknown; 2nd, heat 2	Unknown; 3-4, semifinal 1	Did not advance
1/4 mile	5-8	Henry Wittman	Unknown; 2nd, heat 4	Unknown; 3-4, semifinal 2	Did not advance
1/4 mile	9-11	Fred Grinham	Unknown; 3rd, heat 3	did not advance	
1/4 mile	9-11	Oscar Schwab	Unknown; 3rd, heat 2	did not advance	
1/4 mile	9-11	Anthony Williamsen	Unknown; 3rd, heat 4	did not advance	
1/3 mile	1st	Marcus Hurley	Unknown; 1-2, heat 3 or 4	44.2 seconds 1st, semifinal 2	43.8 seconds
1/3 mile	2nd	Burton Downing	Unknown; 1-2, heat 3 or 4	Unknown; 2nd, semifinal 2	Unknown
1/3 mile	3rd	Teddy Billington	Unknown; 2nd, heat 1	50.2 seconds 1st, semifinal 1	Unknown
1/3 mile	4th	Charles Schlee	Unknown; 1st, heat 1	Unknown; 2nd, semifinal 1	Unknown
1/3 mile	5-8	Oscar Goerke	Unknown; 1st, heat 2	Unknown; 3-4, semifinal 1	Did not advance
1/3 mile	5-8	Fred Grinham	Unknown; 2nd, heat 2	Unknown; 3-4, semifinal 1	Did not advance
1/3 mile	5-8	Unknown	Unknown; 1-2, heat 3 or 4	Unknown; 3-4, semifinal 2	Did not advance
1/3 mile	5-8	Unknown	Unknown; 1-2, heat 3 or 4	Unknown; 3-4, semifinal 2	Did not advance
1/3 mile	9-10	Unknown	Unknown; 3rd, heat 3 or 4	did not advance	
1/3 mile	9-10	Unknown	Unknown; 3rd, heat 3 or 4	did not advance	
1/2 mile	1st	Marcus Hurley	1:08.6; 1st, heat 1	1:12.8; 1st, semifinal 1	1:09.0
1/2 mile	2nd	Teddy Billington	1:18.6; 1st, heat 3	1:09.0; 1st, semifinal 2	Unknown
1/2 mile	3rd	Burton Downing	1:13.6; 1st, heat 4	Unknown; 2nd, semifinal 2	Unknown
1/2 mile	4th	George E. Wiley	Unknown; 2nd, heat 1	Unknown; 2nd, semifinal 1	Unknown
1/2 mile	5-8	Aimé Fritz	1:07.0; 1st, heat 2	Unknown; 3-4, semifinal 1	Did not advance
1/2 mile	5-8	Fred Grinham	Unknown; 2nd, heat 4	Unknown; 3-4, semifinal 2	Did not advance
1/2 mile	5-8	Charles Schlee	Unknown; 2nd, heat 2	Unknown; 3-4, semifinal 1	Did not advance
1/2 mile	5-8	Henry Wittman	Unknown; 2nd, heat 3	Unknown; 3-4, semifinal 2	Did not advance
1/2 mile	9-16	Arthur F. Andrews	Unknown; 3rd, heat 1	did not advance	
1/2 mile	9-16	Oscar Goerke	Unknown; 3rd, heat 2	did not advance	
1/2 mile	9-16	Leo Larson	Unknown; 3rd, heat 4	did not advance	
1/2 mile	9-16	Joel N. McCrea	Unknown; 4th, heat ?	did not advance	
1/2 mile	9-16	Oscar Schwab	Unknown; 4th, heat ?	did not advance	
1/2 mile	9-16	Anthony Williamsen	Unknown; 3rd, heat 3	did not advance	
1/2 mile	9-16	Unknown	Unknown; 4th, heat ?	did not advance	
1/2 mile	9-16	Unknown	Unknown; 4th, heat ?	did not advance	

Event	Place	Cyclist	Semifinals	Final
1 mile	1st	Marcus Hurley	2:34.2; 1st, semifinal 1	2:41.6
1 mile	2nd	Burton Downing	2:33.0; 1st, semifinal 2	Unknown
1 mile	3rd	Teddy Billington	Unknown; 2nd, semifinal 2	Unknown
1 mile	4th	Oscar Goerke	Unknown; 2nd, semifinal 1	Unknown
1 mile	5-7	Charles Schlee	Unknown; 3rd, semifinal 1	Did not advance
1 mile	5-7	George E. Wiley	Unknown; 3rd, semifinal 2	Did not advance
1 mile	5-7	Anthony Williamsen	Unknown; 4th, semifinal 2	Did not advance
1 mile	—	Joel N. McCrea	Did not finish —, semifinal 1	Did not advance

Event	Place	Cyclist	Final
2 miles	1st	Burton Downing	4:57.8
2 miles	2nd	Oscar Goerke	Unknown
2 miles	3rd	Marcus Hurley	Unknown
2 miles	4th	Teddy Billington	Unknown
2 miles	5-13	Charles Schlee	Unknown
2 miles	5-13	Unknown	Unknown
2 miles	5-13	Unknown	Unknown
2 miles	5-13	Unknown	Unknown
2 miles	5-13	Unknown	Unknown
2 miles	5-13	Unknown	Unknown
2 miles	5-13	Unknown	Unknown
2 miles	5-13	Unknown	Unknown
2 miles	5-13	Unknown	Unknown
5 miles	1st	Charles Schlee	13:08.2
5 miles	2nd	George E. Wiley	Unknown
5 miles	3rd	Arthur F. Andrews	Unknown
5 miles	4th	Julius Schaefer	Unknown
5 miles	?	Unknown competitor(s)	Unknown
5 miles	—	Teddy Billington	Did not finish
5 miles	—	Burton Downing	Did not finish
5 miles	—	Oscar Goerke	Did not finish
5 miles	—	Marcus Hurley	Did not finish
5 miles	—	Joel N. McCrea	Did not finish
25 miles	1st	Burton Downing	1:10:55.4
25 miles	2nd	Arthur F. Andrews	Unknown
25 miles	3rd	George E. Wiley	Unknown
25 miles	4th	Samuel LaVoice	Unknown
25 miles	—	Teddy Billington	Did not finish
25 miles	—	Oscar Goerke	Did not finish
25 miles	—	Marcus Hurley	Did not finish
25 miles	—	Julius Schaefer	Did not finish
25 miles	—	Charles Schlee	Did not finish
25 miles	—	Anthony Williamsen	Did not finish

=== Diving ===
The United States and Germany were the two nations that competed in diving.

Event	Place	Diver	Final
Platform	1st	George Sheldon	12.66 points
Platform	3rd	Frank Kehoe	11.33 points
Plunge for distance	1st	William Dickey	19.05 metres
Plunge for distance	2nd	Edgar Adams	17.52 metres
Plunge for distance	3rd	Leo Goodwin	17.37 metres
Plunge for distance	4th	Newman Samuels	16.76 metres
Plunge for distance	5th	Charles Pyrah	14.02 metres

=== Fencing ===
Event	Place	Fencer	Semifinal	Final
Men's foil	2nd	Albertson Van Zo Post		
Men's foil	3rd	Charles Tatham (fencer)		
Men's foil	5-6	Wilfred Holroyd	1-2; 3rd, semifinal B	Did not advance
Men's foil	5-6	Charles Fitzhugh Townsend	2-2; 3rd, semifinal A	Did not advance
Men's foil	7-8	Theodore Carstens	1-3; 4th, semifinal A	Did not advance
Men's foil	7-8	Arthur Fox	0-3; 4th, semifinal B	Did not advance
Men's foil	9th	William Grebe	0-4; 5th, semifinal A	Did not advance

Event	Place	Fencer	Final
Men's team foil	2nd	Charles Tatham; Charles Fitzhugh Townsend; Arthur Fox	0-1 (2-7)
Men's épée	2nd	Charles Tatham (fencer)	
Men's épée	3rd	Albertson Van Zo Post	
Men's épée	5th	Charles Fitzhugh Townsend	Unknown
Men's sabre	2nd	William Grebe	2-1
Men's sabre	3rd	Albertson Van Zo Post	
Men's sabre	4th	Theodore Carstens	1-2
Men's sabre	5th	Arthur Fox	0-3
Men's singlestick	1st	Albertson Van Zo Post	
Men's singlestick	2nd	William O'Connor	8
Men's singlestick	3rd	William Grebe	2

=== Football (soccer) ===
The United States made its first appearance in football, known there as soccer, in 1904. Two American club teams played in a round-robin with a Canadian team, with the Canadian team defeating both of the American squads. The Americans then played two scoreless draws against each other before one won the third contest, 2–0.

Summary

Team	Event	Wins	Losses	Percent	Rank
Christian Brothers College	Men's football	1	1	.500	2nd place, silver medalist(s)
St. Rose Parish	Men's football	0	2	.000	3rd place, bronze medalist(s)

Standings

Pos	Team	Pld	W	D	L	GF	GA	GD	Pts	Final result
1	(Canada) Galt FC (C)	2	2	0	0	11	0	+11	4	Champions
2	(United States) Christian Brothers College (H)	3	1	1	1	2	7	−5	3	
3	(United States) St. Rose Parish (H)	3	0	1	2	0	6	−6	1	

Source: RSSF
(C) Champions; (H) Hosts

Matches

November 16, 1904

Christian Brothers College (United States)	0–7	(Canada) Galt FC
	Report; Report 2	Steep; Taylor; McDonald; Hall

Francis Olympic Field, St. Louis
Referee: Paul McSweeney (United States)
November 17, 1904

St. Rose Parish (United States)	0–4	(Canada) Galt FC
	Report	Taylor; Henderson; Unknown (o.g.)

Francis Olympic Field, St. Louis
Referee: Paul McSweeney (United States)

Team details

GK	Frank Frost
RB	George Cooke
LB	Henry Jameson
RH	Joseph Brady
CH	Edward Dierkes
LH	Martin Dooling
OR	Cormic Cosgrove
IR	Leo O'Connell
CF	Claude Jameson
IL	Harry Tate
OL	Thomas Cooke

GK	Ernest Linton
RB	George Ducker
LB	John Gourlay (c)
RH	Robert Lane
CH	Albert Johnston
LH	Otto Christman
OR	Thomas Taylor
IR	Frederick Steep
CF	Alexander Hall
IL	Albert Henderson
OL	William Twaits

November 20, 1904

Christian Brothers College (United States)	0–0	(United States) St. Rose Parish
	Report

Francis Olympic Field, St. Louis
Referee: Armstrong (United States)
November 23, 1904
Replay

Christian Brothers College (United States)	2–0	(United States) St. Rose Parish
Unknown	Report

Francis Olympic Field, St. Louis
Referee: Armstrong (United States)

Roster – Christian Brothers College

Player coach: Joe Lydon (United States)

No.	Pos.	Player	Date of birth (age)	Caps	Club
	GK	Louis Menges	30 October 1888 (aged 16)	0	(United States) Collegians
	DF	Tom January	8 January 1886 (aged 18)	0	(United States) Collegians
	DF	Oscar Brockmeyer	13 November 1883 (aged 21)	0	(United States) Collegians
	MF	Peter Ratican	13 April 1887 (aged 17)	0	(United States) Collegians
	MF	John January	6 March 1882 (aged 22)	0	(United States) Collegians
	MF	Charles January	1 February 1888 (aged 16)	0	(United States) Collegians
	FW	Joe Lydon	2 February 1878 (aged 26)	0	(United States) Collegians
	FW	Ray Lawler	22 February 1888 (aged 16)	0	(United States) Collegians
	FW	Alexander Cudmore	10 February 1888 (aged 16)	0	(United States) Collegians
	FW	Warren Brittingham	2 September 1886 (aged 18)	0	(United States) Collegians
	FW	Charles Bartliff	18 August 1886 (aged 18)	0	(United States) Collegians

Roster – St. Rose Parish

No.	Pos.	Player	Date of birth (age)	Caps	Club
	GK	Frank Frost		0	(United States) St. Rose
	DF	Henry Jameson	19 April 1883 (aged 21)	0	(United States) St. Rose
	DF	George Cooke	17 February 1883 (aged 21)	0	(United States) St. Rose
	MF	Edward Dierkes	14 March 1886 (aged 18)	0	(United States) St. Rose
	MF	Martin Dooling	18 December 1886 (aged 17)	0	(United States) St. Rose
	MF	Joseph Brady		0	(United States) St. Rose
	FW	Tom Cooke	22 August 1885 (aged 19)	0	(United States) St. Rose
	FW	Harry Tate	31 July 1886 (aged 18)	0	(United States) St. Rose
	FW	Leo O'Connell	31 August 1883 (aged 21)	0	(United States) St. Rose
	FW	Claude Jameson	20 January 1886 (aged 18)	0	(United States) St. Rose
	FW	Cormic Cosgrove	15 February 1869 (aged 35)	0	(United States) St. Rose
	FW	Johnson		0	(United States) St. Rose

=== Golf ===
Event	Place	Golfer	Qualification	Round of 32	Round of 16	Quarterfinal	Semifinal	Final
Men's individual	2nd	Chandler Egan	166 (6th)	Defeated Harold Fraser	Defeated Nathaniel Moore	Defeated Harry Allen	Defeated Burt McKinnie	Lost to George Lyon
Men's individual	3rd	Burt McKinnie	170 (11th)	Defeated Harold Weber	Defeated Robert Hunter	Defeated Daniel Sawyer	Lost to Chandler Egan	Did not advance
Men's individual	3rd	Francis Newton	164 (3rd)	Defeated Edward Cummins	Defeated Allan Lard	Defeated Mason Phelps	Lost to George Lyon	Did not advance
Men's individual	5-8	Harry Allen	178 (22nd)	Defeated Warren Wood	Defeated William Stickney	Lost to Chandler Egan	Did not advance	
Men's individual	5-8	Albert Lambert	168 (8th)	Defeated Walter Egan	Defeated Ralph McKittrick	Lost to George Lyon	Did not advance	
Men's individual	5-8	Mason Phelps	166 (6th)	Defeated Frederick Semple	Defeated Arthur Havemeyer	Lost to Francis Newton	Did not advance	
Men's individual	5-8	Daniel Sawyer	169 (9th)	Defeated Jesse Carlton	Defeated Simpson Foulis	Lost to Burt McKinnie	Did not advance	
Men's individual	9-16	Simpson Foulis	174 (16th)	Defeated Henry Potter	Lost to Daniel Sawyer	Did not advance		
Men's individual	9-16	Arthur Havemeyer	178 (22nd)	Defeated Simeon Price	Lost to Mason Phelps	Did not advance		
Men's individual	9-16	Robert Hunter	171 (14th)	Defeated Raymond Havemeyer	Lost to Burt McKinnie	Did not advance		
Men's individual	9-16	Allan Lard	183 (29th)	Defeated Abner Vickery	Lost to Francis Newton	Did not advance		
Men's individual	9-16	Ralph McKittrick	163 (1st)	Defeated Douglass Cadwallader	Lost to Albert Lambert	Did not advance		
Men's individual	9-16	Nathaniel Moore	177 (19th)	Defeated Orus Jones	Lost to Chandler Egan	Did not advance		
Men's individual	9-16	Stuart Stickney	163 (1st)	Defeated William Smith	Lost to George Lyon	Did not advance		
Men's individual	9-16	William Stickney	165 (4th)	Defeated Clement Smoot	Lost to Harry Allen	Did not advance		
Men's individual	17-32	Douglass Cadwallader	170 (11th)	Lost to Ralph McKittrick	Did not advance			
Men's individual	17-32	John Cady	182 (27th)	Lost to George Lyon	Did not advance			
Men's individual	17-32	Jesse Carleton	174 (16th)	Lost to Daniel Sawyer	Did not advance			
Men's individual	17-32	Edward Cummins	179 (25th)	Lost to Francis Newton	Did not advance			
Men's individual	17-32	Walter Egan	165 (4th)	Lost to Albert Lambert	Did not advance			
Men's individual	17-32	Harold Fraser	183 (29th)	Lost to Chandler Egan	Did not advance			
Men's individual	17-32	Raymond Havemeyer	183 (29th)	Lost to Robert Hunter	Did not advance			
Men's individual	17-32	Orus Jones	177 (19th)	Lost to Nathaniel Moore	Did not advance			
Men's individual	17-32	Henry Potter	173 (15th)	Lost to Simpson Foulis	Did not advance			
Men's individual	17-32	Simeon Price	177 (19th)	Lost to Arthur Havemeyer	Did not advance			
Men's individual	17-32	Frederick Semple	180 (26th)	Lost to Mason Phelps	Did not advance			
Men's individual	17-32	William Smith	183 (29th)	Lost to Stuart Stickney	Did not advance			
Men's individual	17-32	Clement Smoot	178 (22nd)	Lost to William Stickney	Did not advance			
Men's individual	17-32	Abner Vickery	182 (27th)	Lost to Allan Lard	Did not advance			
Men's individual	17-32	Harold Weber	174 (16th)	Lost to Burt McKinnie	Did not advance			
Men's individual	17-32	Warren Wood	170 (11th)	Lost to Harry Allen	Did not advance			
Men's individual	33rd	Bart Adams	184	Did not advance				
Men's individual	33rd	William Burton	184	Did not advance				
Men's individual	35th	Louis Boyd	185	Did not advance				
Men's individual	35th	Charles Scudder	185	Did not advance				
Men's individual	37th	Edwin Hunter	187	Did not advance				
Men's individual	37th	Harold Simkins	187	Did not advance				
Men's individual	39th	John Rahm	188	Did not advance				
Men's individual	40th	Arthur Hussey	191	Did not advance				
Men's individual	40th	Herbert Sumney	191	Did not advance				
Men's individual	42nd	E. Campbell Brown	192	Did not advance				
Men's individual	42nd	Henry Case	192	Did not advance				
Men's individual	42nd	E. M. Davis	192	Did not advance				
Men's individual	45th	R. H. Flack	195	Did not advance				
Men's individual	45th	George Powell	195	Did not advance				
Men's individual	45th	C. E. Williard	195	Did not advance				
Men's individual	48th	Charles Potter	196	Did not advance				
Men's individual	48th	George Thomas	196	Did not advance				
Men's individual	50th	George Oliver	197	Did not advance				
Men's individual	51st	W. A. Hersey	198	Did not advance				
Men's individual	52nd	J. S. Brandt	199	Did not advance				
Men's individual	52nd	E. C. Edmunds	199	Did not advance				
Men's individual	54th	F. C. Newberry	201	Did not advance				
Men's individual	55th	A. H. Annan	202	Did not advance				
Men's individual	55th	L. J. Hazleton	202	Did not advance				
Men's individual	57th	Murray Carleton	203	Did not advance				
Men's individual	58th	Louis Allis	205	Did not advance				
Men's individual	59th	John Watson	206	Did not advance				
Men's individual	60th	Jarvis Hunt	207	Did not advance				
Men's individual	60th	Alexander Mackintosh	207	Did not advance				
Men's individual	62nd	Wallace Shaw	209	Did not advance				
Men's individual	62nd	William Withers	209	Did not advance				
Men's individual	64th	J. J. Howard	210	Did not advance				
Men's individual	66th	J. L. Stack	213	Did not advance				
Men's individual	66th	Mead Yates	213	Did not advance				
Men's individual	68th	William Groseclose	214	Did not advance				
Men's individual	68th	Simon Harbaugh	214	Did not advance				
Men's individual	70th	E. W. Lansing	219	Did not advance				
Men's individual	71st	Edward Gould	222	Did not advance				
Men's individual	72nd	Clarence Angier	226	Did not advance				
Men's individual	74th	E. Lee Jones	240	Did not advance				
Men's individual	—	Charles Cory	DNF	Did not advance				

Event	Place	Team	Total
Men's team	1st	Western Golf Association Chandler Egan, Daniel Sawyer, Robert Hunter, Kenneth Edwards, Clement Smoot, Warren Wood, Mason Phelps, Walter Egan, Edward Cummins, Nathaniel Moore	1749
Men's team	2nd	Trans-Mississippi Golf Association Francis Newton, Henry Potter, Ralph McKittrick, Albert Lambert, Frederick Semple, Stuart Stickney, Burt McKinnie, William Stickney, John Maxwell, John Cady	1770
Men's team	3rd	United States Golf Association Douglass Cadwallader, Allan Lard, Jesse Carleton, Simeon Price, Harold Weber, John Rahm, Arthur Hussey, Orus Jones, Harold Fraser, George Oliver	1839

=== Gymnastics ===
==== Turnverein ====
Event	Place	Gymnast	Score
Men's all-around	1st	Julius Lenhart (AUT)	69.80
Men's all-around	6th	Otto Steffen	67.03
Men's all-around	8th	John Bissinger	66.57
Men's all-around	10th	William Merz	65.26
Men's all-around	11th	Phillip Kassell	64.56
Men's all-around	12th	Theodore Gross	64.39
Men's all-around	14th	Otto Boehnke	64.10
Men's all-around	15th	William Andelfinger	63.53
Men's all-around	16th	George Stapf	63.47
Men's all-around	17th	Charles Umbs	63.19
Men's all-around	18th	Anton Heida	62.72
Men's all-around	20th	Andreas Kempf	62.57
Men's all-around	21st	George Mayer	61.66
Men's all-around	22nd	Fred Schmind	61.40
Men's all-around	23rd	Andrew Neu	61.21
Men's all-around	24th	John Duha	61.02
Men's all-around	25th	Reinhard Wagner	60.73
Men's all-around	26th	Lorenz Spann	60.32
Men's all-around	27th	Emil Rothe	60.27
Men's all-around	28th	Ragnar Berg	60.24
Men's all-around	29th	Robert Herrmann	59.99
Men's all-around	30th	Emil Beyer	59.70
Men's all-around	31st	Max Hess	59.29
Men's all-around	32nd	Edward Siegler	59.03
Men's all-around	33rd	Harry Hansen	59.00
Men's all-around	34th	Max Wolf	57.85
Men's all-around	35th	Frank Schicke	57.47
Men's all-around	36th	John Dellert	57.41
Men's all-around	37th	Charles Sorum	57.40
Men's all-around	38th	William Horschke	57.33
Men's all-around	39th	Oliver Olsen	57.27
Men's all-around	40th	Rudolf Krupitzer	57.18
Men's all-around	41st	Gustav Mueller	57.12
Men's all-around	42nd	Emil Schwegler	56.87
Men's all-around	43rd	Henry Koeder	56.58
Men's all-around	44th	Louis Kniep	56.57
Men's all-around	45th	William Traband	56.26
Men's all-around	46th	Leander Keim	56.16
Men's all-around	47th	Ernst Reckeweg	56.15
Men's all-around	48th	Charles Krause	56.11
Men's all-around	49th	Jacob Hertenbahn	55.77
Men's all-around	50th	Edward Hennig	55.63
Men's all-around	51st	Philip Schuster	55.44
Men's all-around	52nd	John Grieb	55.21
Men's all-around	53rd	P. Gussmann	54.92
Men's all-around	54th	Gustav Hämmerlin	54.87
Men's all-around	55th	William Tritschler	54.73
Men's all-around	56th	Christian Deubler	54.63
Men's all-around	57th	Julian Schmitz	54.58
Men's all-around	58th	Otto Neimand	54.54
Men's all-around	59th	Robert Maysack	54.53
Men's all-around	60th	Emil Voigt	54.33
Men's all-around	61st	Anthony Jahnke	53.94
Men's all-around	62nd	Phillip Sontag	53.83
Men's all-around	63rd	Oluf Landnes	53.64
Men's all-around	64th	George Aschenbrener	53.47
Men's all-around	65th	John Wolf	53.43
Men's all-around	66th	Edward Tritschler	53.16
Men's all-around	67th	Max Emmerich	52.85
Men's all-around	68th	Henry Prinzler	52.81
Men's all-around	69th	Frank Raab	52.39
Men's all-around	70th	Louis Hunger	52.22
Men's all-around	71st	George Eyser	52.20
Men's all-around	72nd	William Berewald	51.87
Men's all-around	73rd	George Mastrovich	51.83
Men's all-around	73rd	Martin Ludwig	51.83
Men's all-around	75th	Max Rascher	51.53
Men's all-around	76th	Henry Kraft	51.40
Men's all-around	77th	Willard Schrader	51.22
Men's all-around	78th	James Dwyer	51.00
Men's all-around	79th	George Schroeder	50.90
Men's all-around	80th	Bob Reynolds	50.74
Men's all-around	81st	Harry Warnken	50.53
Men's all-around	82nd	Bergin Nilsen	50.45
Men's all-around	83rd	John Leichinger	50.00
Men's all-around	84th	Rudolf Schrader	49.64
Men's all-around	85th	Michael Lang	49.44
Men's all-around	86th	Charles Dellert	49.35
Men's all-around	87th	Alvin Kritschmann	48.97
Men's all-around	88th	Richard Tritschler	48.80
Men's all-around	89th	Arthur Rosenkampff	48.34
Men's all-around	90th	Clarence Kiddington	48.30
Men's all-around	91st	Hy. Meyland	47.94
Men's all-around	92nd	Barry Chimberoff	47.93
Men's all-around	93rd	K. Woerner	47.67
Men's all-around	94th	Curt Roedel	47.63
Men's all-around	95th	M. Barry	47.43
Men's all-around	96th	P. Ritter	47.09
Men's all-around	97th	Otto Feyder	47.05
Men's all-around	98th	Bernard Berg	46.73
Men's all-around	99th	Max Thomas	45.85
Men's all-around	100th	Martin Fischer	45.35
Men's all-around	101st	Charles Schwartz	45.34
Men's all-around	102nd	Wilhelm Zabel	45.13
Men's all-around	103rd	Louis Rathke	44.93
Men's all-around	104th	L. Guerner	44.90
Men's all-around	105th	William Herzog	44.60
Men's all-around	106th	August Placke	44.41
Men's all-around	106th	Otto Roissner	44.41
Men's all-around	108th	Paul Studen	43.38
Men's all-around	109th	Arthur Sundbye	43.21
Men's all-around	110th	Christian Sperl	42.66
Men's all-around	111th	William Kruppinger	42.50
Men's all-around	112th	J. Wassow	42.46
Men's all-around	113th	Walter Real	42.44
Men's all-around	114th	John Miesel	41.97
Men's all-around	115th	Otto Thomsen	41.67
Men's all-around	116th	Edward Pueschell	40.36
Men's all-around	117th	Otto Knerr	39.87
Men's all-around	118th	William Friedrich	39.57
Men's all-around	119th	Theodore Studler	13.14
Men's triathlon	2nd	Julius Lenhart (AUT)	43.00
Men's triathlon	6th	Otto Steffen	39.53
Men's triathlon	7th	William Andelfinger	39.03
Men's triathlon	8th	Andreas Kempf	38.97
Men's triathlon	10th	George Eyser	38.70
Men's triathlon	12th	Anton Heida	37.72
Men's triathlon	14th	John Bissinger	37.57
Men's triathlon	15th	Charles Umbs	37.49
Men's triathlon	16th	Theodore Gross	37.19
Men's triathlon	18th	Otto Boehnke	36.50
Men's triathlon	19th	Phillip Kassell	35.66
Men's triathlon	20th	William Horschke	35.63
Men's triathlon	21st	Emil Schwegler	35.57
Men's triathlon	22nd	John Duha	35.32
Men's triathlon	23rd	George Stapf	35.27
Men's triathlon	24th	William Merz	35.26
Men's triathlon	25th	Gustav Mueller	35.12
Men's triathlon	26th	Emil Rothe	34.87
Men's triathlon	27th	Harry Hansen	34.20
Men's triathlon	28th	Gustav Hämmerlin	33.97
Men's triathlon	29th	Reinhard Wagner	33.73
Men's triathlon	30th	John Dellert	33.71
Men's triathlon	31st	Charles Sorum	33.40
Men's triathlon	32nd	Julian Schmitz	33.38
Men's triathlon	33rd	Max Wolf	33.25
Men's triathlon	34th	Emil Beyer	33.20
Men's triathlon	35th	Robert Herrmann	32.99
Men's triathlon	36th	Lorenz Spann	32.92
Men's triathlon	37th	Fred Schmind	32.90
Men's triathlon	38th	Ragnar Berg	32.85
Men's triathlon	39th	George Mayer	32.66
Men's triathlon	40th	Andrew Neu	32.61
Men's triathlon	41st	William Traband	31.96
Men's triathlon	42nd	Emil Voigt	31.93
Men's triathlon	43rd	P. Gussmann	31.82
Men's triathlon	44th	Rudolf Krupitzer	31.68
Men's triathlon	45th	Charles Krause	31.61
Men's triathlon	46th	Martin Ludwig	31.43
Men's triathlon	47th	Christian Deubler	31.13
Men's triathlon	48th	Frank Raab	30.89
Men's triathlon	49th	Oliver Olsen	30.87
Men's triathlon	50th	Max Hess	30.79
Men's triathlon	51st	Jacob Hertenbahn	30.77
Men's triathlon	52nd	Louis Kniep	30.67
Men's triathlon	53rd	Edward Siegler	30.63
Men's triathlon	54th	Philip Schuster	30.34
Men's triathlon	55th	Robert Maysack	30.33
Men's triathlon	56th	Max Rascher	30.13
Men's triathlon	57th	Alvin Kritschmann	30.07
Men's triathlon	58th	Henry Koeder	29.98
Men's triathlon	59th	Edward Hennig	29.93
Men's triathlon	60th	Leander Keim	29.76
Men's triathlon	61st	William Tritschler	29.73
Men's triathlon	62nd	Edward Tritschler	29.66
Men's triathlon	63rd	Frank Schicke	29.07
Men's triathlon	64th	Charles Dellert	29.05
Men's triathlon	65th	Henry Kraft	28.70
Men's triathlon	66th	Curt Roedel	28.63
Men's triathlon	67th	Ernst Reckeweg	28.35
Men's triathlon	68th	Rudolf Schrader	28.34
Men's triathlon	69th	George Aschenbrener	27.97
Men's triathlon	69th	K. Woerner	27.97
Men's triathlon	71st	George Mastrovich	27.73
Men's triathlon	71st	John Wolf	27.73
Men's triathlon	73rd	Phillip Sontag	27.63
Men's triathlon	74th	Anthony Jahnke	27.54
Men's triathlon	75th	M. Barry	27.33
Men's triathlon	76th	Arthur Rosenkampff	27.24
Men's triathlon	77th	James Dwyer	26.70
Men's triathlon	78th	Michael Lang	26.44
Men's triathlon	78th	Oluf Landnes	26.44
Men's triathlon	80th	Henry Prinzler	26.41
Men's triathlon	81st	Richard Tritschler	26.40
Men's triathlon	82nd	Louis Hunger	26.32
Men's triathlon	83rd	Charles Schwartz	26.24
Men's triathlon	84th	Otto Neimand	26.14
Men's triathlon	85th	Bergin Nilsen	26.05
Men's triathlon	86th	Hy. Meyland	25.54
Men's triathlon	87th	George Schroeder	25.50
Men's triathlon	88th	Harry Warnken	25.43
Men's triathlon	89th	William Berewald	25.27
Men's triathlon	90th	John Grieb	25.21
Men's triathlon	91st	Willard Schrader	24.72
Men's triathlon	92nd	Barry Chimberoff	24.53
Men's triathlon	93rd	P. Ritter	24.29
Men's triathlon	94th	Martin Fischer	24.15
Men's triathlon	95th	Wilhelm Zabel	23.63
Men's triathlon	96th	William Herzog	23.50
Men's triathlon	97th	Bernard Berg	23.33
Men's triathlon	98th	August Placke	23.11
Men's triathlon	99th	Arthur Sundbye	23.01
Men's triathlon	100th	Max Emmerich	22.85
Men's triathlon	101st	Paul Studen	22.48
Men's triathlon	102nd	Bob Reynolds	22.44
Men's triathlon	103rd	John Leichinger	22.30
Men's triathlon	104th	Walter Real	22.24
Men's triathlon	105th	Otto Roissner	21.90
Men's triathlon	106th	William Friedrich	21.87
Men's triathlon	107th	Otto Feyder	21.85
Men's triathlon	108th	Clarence Kiddington	21.80
Men's triathlon	109th	John Miesel	21.77
Men's triathlon	110th	L. Guerner	21.70
Men's triathlon	111th	Christian Sperl	21.36
Men's triathlon	112th	William Kruppinger	21.20
Men's triathlon	113th	Edward Pueschell	21.06
Men's triathlon	114th	Louis Rathke	19.83
Men's triathlon	115th	Otto Knerr	19.47
Men's triathlon	116th	Max Thomas	19.45
Men's triathlon	117th	Otto Thomsen	18.07
Men's triathlon	118th	J. Wassow	16.96
Men's triathlon	119th	Theodore Studler	13.14
Men's team	1st	Philadelphia Turngemeinde (Mixed team)	370.13
Men's team	2nd	New York Turnverein	356.37
Men's team	3rd	Central Turnverein	352.79
Men's team	4th	Concordia Turnverein	344.01
Men's team	5th	South St. Louis Turnverein	338.32
Men's team	6th	Norwegier Turnverein	338.00
Men's team	7th	Turnverein Vorwärts (Chicago)	329.68
Men's team	8th	Davenport Turngemeinde	325.52
Men's team	9th	La Salle Turnverein	318.13
Men's team	10th	Passaic Turnverein	301.39
Men's team	11th	Milwaukee Turnverein	286.97
Men's team	12th	Socialer Turnverein	273.65
Men's team	13th	Turnverein Vorwärts (Cleveland)	271.84

==== Swedish system ====
Event	Place	Gymnast	Score
Men's combined	1st	Anton Heida	161
Men's combined	2nd	George Eyser	152
Men's combined	3rd	William Merz	135
Men's combined	4th	John Duha	Unknown
Men's combined	5th	Edward Hennig	Unknown
Men's parallel bars	1st	George Eyser	44
Men's parallel bars	2nd	Anton Heida	43
Men's parallel bars	3rd	John Duha	40
Men's parallel bars	4-5	Edward Hennig	Unknown
Men's parallel bars	4-5	William Merz	Unknown
Men's horizontal bar	1st	Anton Heida	40
Men's horizontal bar	1st	Edward Hennig	40
Men's horizontal bar	3rd	George Eyser	39
Men's horizontal bar	4-5	John Duha	Unknown
Men's horizontal bar	4-5	William Merz	Unknown
Men's vault	1st	George Eyser	36
Men's vault	1st	Anton Heida	36
Men's vault	3rd	William Merz	31
Men's vault	4-5	John Duha	Unknown
Men's vault	4-5	Edward Hennig	Unknown
Men's pommel horse	1st	Anton Heida	42
Men's pommel horse	2nd	George Eyser	33
Men's pommel horse	3rd	William Merz	29
Men's pommel horse	4-5	John Duha	Unknown
Men's pommel horse	4-5	Edward Hennig	Unknown
Men's rings	1st	Herman Glass	45
Men's rings	2nd	William Merz	35
Men's rings	3rd	Emil Voigt	32
Men's rope climbing	1st	George Eyser	7.0
Men's rope climbing	2nd	Charles Krause	7.2
Men's rope climbing	3rd	Emil Voigt	9.8
Men's club swinging	1st	Edward Hennig	13
Men's club swinging	2nd	Emil Voigt	9
Men's club swinging	3rd	Ralph Wilson	5

=== Lacrosse ===
The sport of field lacrosse was played at the 1904 Summer Olympics, which marked the first time that lacrosse had been featured at the Olympic Games. Three teams participated — two from Canada and one from the United States.

Event	Place	Team	Semifinals	Final
Men's lacrosse	2nd	St. Louis Amateur Athletic Association	Defeated Canada; Mohawk Indians	Lost to Canada; Shamrock Lacrosse Team

=== Roque ===
Event	Place	Player	Score
Men's individual	1st	Charles Jacobus	Unknown
Men's individual	2nd	Smith Streeter	Unknown
Men's individual	3rd	Charles Brown	Unknown
Men's individual	4th	William Chalfant	Unknown

=== Rowing ===
Event	Place	Crew	Final
Single sculls	1st	Frank Greer	10:08.5
Single sculls	2nd	James Juvenal	Unknown
Single sculls	3rd	Constance Titus	Unknown
Single sculls	4th	David Duffield	Unknown
Double sculls	1st	John Mulcahy and William Varley	10:03.2
Double sculls	2nd	Jamie McLoughlin and John Hoben	Unknown
Double sculls	3rd	Joseph Ravannack and John Wells	Unknown
Coxless pair	1st	Robert Farnan and Joseph Ryan	10:57.0
Coxless pair	2nd	John Mulcahy and William Varley	Unknown
Coxless pair	3rd	John Joachim and Joseph Buerger	Unknown
Coxless four	1st	Arthur Stockhoff, August Erker, George Dietz, and Albert Nasse	9:05.8
Coxless four	2nd	Frederick Suerig, Martin Formanack, Charles Aman, and Michael Begley	Unknown
Coxless four	3rd	Gus Voerg, John Freitag, Lou Heim, and Frank Dummerth	Unknown
Eight	1st	Frederick Cresser, Michael Gleason, Frank Schell, James Flanagan, Charles Armstrong, Harry Lott, Joseph Dempsey, John Exley, Louis Abell	7:50.0

=== Swimming ===
Event	Place	Swimmer	Heats	Final
50 yd free	2nd	Scott Leary	28.2 seconds 1st, heat 2	28.2 seconds 28.6 (race-off)
50 yd free	3rd	Charles Daniels	Unknown; 2nd, heat 2	Unknown
50 yd free	4th	David Gaul	Unknown; 3rd, heat 2	Unknown
50 yd free	5th	Leo Goodwin	Unknown; 2nd, heat 1	Unknown
50 yd free	6th	Raymond Thorne	Unknown; 3rd, heat 1	Unknown
50 yd free	7-9	David Hammond	Unknown; 4-5, heat 1 or 2	Did not advance
50 yd free	7-9	Bill Orthwein	Unknown; 4-5, heat 1 or 2	Did not advance
50 yd free	7-9	Edwin Swatek	Unknown; 4-5, heat 1 or 2	Did not advance
100 yd free	2nd	Charles Daniels	1:07.4; 1st, heat 2	Unknown
100 yd free	3rd	Scott Leary	Unknown; 2nd, heat 1	Unknown
100 yd free	4th	David Gaul	Unknown; 2nd, heat 2	Unknown
100 yd free	5th	David Hammond	Unknown; 3rd, heat 1	Unknown
100 yd free	6th	Leo Goodwin	Unknown; 3rd, heat 2	Unknown
100 yd free	7-9	Bill Orthwein	Unknown; 4-5, heat 1 or 2	Did not advance
100 yd free	7-9	Edwin Swatek	Unknown; 4-5, heat 1 or 2	Did not advance
100 yd free	7-9	Raymond Thorne	Unknown; 4-5, heat 1 or 2	Did not advance

Event	Place	Swimmer	Final
220 yd free	1st	Charles Daniels	2:44.2
220 yd free	2nd	Francis Gailey (AUS)	2:46.0
220 yd free	4th	Edgar Adams	Unknown
440 yd free	1st	Charles Daniels	6:16.2
440 yd free	2nd	Francis Gailey (AUS)	6:22.0
440 yd free	4th	Leo Goodwin	Unknown
880 yd free	2nd	Francis Gailey (AUS)	13:23.4
880 yd free	4th	Edgar Adams	Unknown
880 yd free	5th	Jam Handy	Unknown
1 mile free	3rd	Francis Gailey (AUS)	28:54.0
1 mile free	—	Edgar Adams	Did not finish
1 mile free	—	Louis Handley	Did not finish
1 mile free	—	John Meyers	Did not finish
100 yd back	4th	Bill Orthwein	Unknown
100 yd back	5-6	David Hammond	Unknown
100 yd back	5-6	Edwin Swatek	Unknown
440 yd breast	3rd	Jam Handy	Unknown

Event	Place	Team	Final
4x50 yd free relay	1st	Joe Ruddy, Leo Goodwin, Louis Handley, and Charles Daniels	Unknown
4x50 yd free relay	2nd	David Hammond, Bill Tuttle, Hugo Goetz, and Raymond Thorne	Unknown
4x50 yd free relay	3rd	Amedee Reyburn, Gwynne Evans, Marquard Schwarz, and Bill Orthwein	Unknown
4x50 yd free relay	4th	Edgar Adams, David Bratton, George van Cleaf, and David Hesser	Unknown

=== Tennis ===
The United States was one of two nations to compete in tennis.

Event	Place	Player	Round of 64	Round of 32	Round of 16	Quarterfinals	Semifinals	Final
Men's singles	1st	Beals Wright	Bye	Defeated Montgomery (USA)	Defeated Hardy (GER)	Defeated Neely (USA)	Defeated Bell (USA)	Defeated LeRoy (USA)
Men's singles	2nd	Robert LeRoy	Bye	Bye	Defeated Sanderson (USA)	Defeated Cresson (USA)	Defeated Leonard (USA)	Lost to Wright (USA)
Men's singles	3rd	Alphonzo Bell	Bye	Defeated Vernon (USA)	Defeated Davis (USA)	Defeated Russ (USA)	Lost to Wright (USA)	did not advance
Men's singles	3rd	Edgar Leonard	Bye	Defeated Forney (USA)	Defeated McKittrick (USA)	Defeated Blatherwick (USA)	Lost to LeRoy (USA)	did not advance
Men's singles	5th	W. E. Blatherwick	Bye	Defeated Semple (USA)	Defeated Cunningham (USA)	Lost to Leonard (USA)	Did not advance	
Men's singles	5th	Charles Cresson	Bye	Defeated Wheaton (USA)	Bye	Lost to LeRoy (USA)	Did not advance	
Men's singles	5th	John Neely	Bye	Defeated MacDonald (USA)	Defeated Feitshans (USA)	Lost to Wright (USA)	Did not advance	
Men's singles	5th	Semp Russ	Bye	Defeated Turner (USA)	Defeated Jones (USA)	Lost to Bell (USA)	Did not advance	
Men's singles	9th	Joe Cunningham	Bye	Bye	Lost to Blatherwick (USA)	Did not advance		
Men's singles	9th	Dwight F. Davis	Bye	Defeated Tritle (USA)	Lost to Bell (USA)	Did not advance		
Men's singles	9th	Rollin Feitshans	Bye	Defeated Charles (USA)	Lost to Neely (USA)	Did not advance		
Men's singles	9th	Hugh Jones	Bye	Defeated Drew (USA)	Lost to Russ (USA)	Did not advance		
Men's singles	9th	Ralph McKittrick	Bye	Defeated Easton (USA)	Lost to Leonard (USA)	Did not advance		
Men's singles	9th	Fred Sanderson	Bye	Bye	Lost to LeRoy (USA)	Did not advance		
Men's singles	16th	Joseph Charles	Bye	Lost to Feitshans (USA)	Did not advance			
Men's singles	16th	Andrew Drew	Bye	Lost to Jones (USA)	Did not advance			
Men's singles	16th	William Easton	Bye	Lost to McKittrick (USA)	Did not advance			
Men's singles	16th	Chris Forney	Bye	Lost to Leonard (USA)	Did not advance			
Men's singles	16th	Malcolm MacDonald	Bye	Lost to Neely (USA)	Did not advance			
Men's singles	16th	Forest Montgomery	Bye	Lost to Wright (USA)	Did not advance			
Men's singles	16th	Nathaniel Semple	Defeated Stadel (USA)	Lost to Blatherwick (USA)	Did not advance			
Men's singles	16th	James Tritle	Bye	Lost to Davis (USA)	Did not advance			
Men's singles	16th	Douglas Turner	Bye	Lost to Russ (USA)	Did not advance			
Men's singles	16th	Orien Vernon	Bye	Lost to Bell (USA)	Did not advance			
Men's singles	16th	Frank Wheaton	Bye	Lost to Cresson (USA)	Did not advance			
Men's singles	27th	George Stadel	Lost to Semple (USA)	Did not advance				

Event	Place	Pair	Round of 16	Quarterfinals	Semifinals	Final
Men's doubles	1st	Beals Wright; Edgar Leonard	Defeated Blatherwick & Vernon (USA)	Defeated Cresson & Russ (USA)	Defeated Gamble & A. Wear (USA)	Defeated LeRoy & Bell (USA)
Men's doubles	2nd	Robert LeRoy; Alphonzo Bell	Defeated Gleeson (USA) & Hardy (GER)	Defeated McKittrick & Davis (USA)	Defeated J. Wear & West (USA)	Lost to Wright & Leonard (USA)
Men's doubles	3rd	Clarence Gamble; Arthur Wear	Defeated Smith & Charles (USA)	Defeated Wheaton & Hunter (USA)	Lost to Wright & Leonard (USA)	did not advance
Men's doubles	3rd	Joseph Wear; Allen West	Defeated Drew & Turner (USA)	Defeated Jones & Kauffman (USA)	Lost to LeRoy & Bell (USA)	did not advance
Men's doubles	5th	Charles Cresson; Semp Russ	Defeated Montgomery & Tritle (USA)	Lost to Wright & Leonard (USA)	Did not advance	
Men's doubles	5th	Dwight F. Davis; Ralph McKittrick	Defeated N. Semple & MacDonald (USA)	Lost to LeRoy & Bell (USA)	Did not advance	
Men's doubles	5th	Edwin Hunter; Frank Wheaton	Bye	Lost to Gamble & A. Wear (USA)	Did not advance	
Men's doubles	5th	Hugh Jones; Harold Kauffman	Defeated Stadel & F. Semple (USA)	Lost to J. Wear & Allen West (USA)	Did not advance	
Men's doubles	9th	W. E. Blatherwick; Orien Vernon	Lost to Wright & Leonard (USA)	Did not advance		
Men's doubles	9th	Joseph Charles; N. M. Smith	Lost to Gamble & A. Wear (USA)	Did not advance		
Men's doubles	9th	Andrew Drew; Douglas Turner	Lost to J. Wear & West (USA)	Did not advance		
Men's doubles	9th	Paul Gleeson; Hugo Hardy (GER)	Lost to LeRoy & Bell (USA)	Did not advance		
Men's doubles	9th	Malcolm MacDonald; Nathaniel Semple	Lost to McKittrick & Davis (USA)	Did not advance		
Men's doubles	9th	Forest Montgomery; James Tritle	Lost to Cresson & Russ (USA)	Did not advance		
Men's doubles	9th	Frederick Semple; George Stadel	Lost to Jones & Kauffman (USA)	Did not advance		

=== Tug of war ===
Event	Place	Team	Quarterfinals	Semifinals	Final	Silver medal semifinal	Silver medal match
Men's tug of war	1st	Milwaukee AC	Defeated; Boers (RSA)	Defeated; SW Turnverein No. 1 (USA)	Defeated; New York AC (USA)	Not needed	
Men's tug of war	2nd	SW Turnverein of St. Louis No. 1	Defeated; Pan-Hellenic (GRE)	Lost to Milwaukee AC (USA)	Did not advance	Defeated; SW Turnverein No. 2 (USA)	Won by forfeit over New York AC (USA)
Men's tug of war	3rd	SW Turnverein of St. Louis No. 2	Bye	Lost to New York AC (USA)	Did not advance	Lost to SW Turnverein No. 1 (USA)	Awarded bronze via forfeit
Men's tug of war	4th	New York AC	Bye	Defeated; SW Turnverein No. 2 (USA)	Lost to Milwaukee AC (USA)	Not needed	Forfeited to SW Turnverein (USA)

=== Water polo ===
Water polo is mentioned in the games reports for the 1904 Summer Olympics, but initially it was not included in the official International Olympic Committee's medal database for the 1904 Games. However, the IOC later reconsidered and recognized the sport to be a part of the official program.

Event	Place	Team
Men's water polo	1st	New York Athletic Club
Men's water polo	2nd	Chicago Athletic Association
Men's water polo	3rd	Missouri Athletic Club

=== Weightlifting ===
Event	Place	Lifter	Lift
Men's two hand lift	2nd	Oscar Osthoff	84.37
Men's two hand lift	3rd	Frank Kugler (GER)	79.61
Men's two hand lift	4th	Oscar Olson	67.81

Event	Place	Lifter	Total score
Men's all-around dumbbell	1st	Oscar Osthoff	48 points
Men's all-around dumbbell	2nd	Frederick Winters	45 points
Men's all-around dumbbell	3rd	Frank Kugler (GER)	10 points

=== Wrestling ===
The United States wrestling team competed in 1904 for the first time.

Event	Place	Wrestler	Semifinals	Final
Men's freestyle light flyweight	1st	Robert Curry	Defeated Gustav Thiefenthaler	Defeated John Hein
Men's freestyle light flyweight	2nd	John Hein	Defeated Claude Holgate	Lost to Robert Curry
Men's freestyle light flyweight	3rd	Gustav Thiefenthaler (SUI)	Lost to Robert Curry	Did not advance
Men's freestyle light flyweight	4th	Claude Holgate	Lost to John Hein	Did not advance
Men's freestyle flyweight	1st	George Mehnert	Bye	Defeated Gustave Bauer
Men's freestyle flyweight	2nd	Gustave Bauer	Defeated William Nelson	Lost to George Mehnert
Men's freestyle flyweight	3rd	William Nelson	Lost to Gustave Bauer	Did not advance

Event	Place	Wrestler	Quarterfinals	Semifinals	Final
Men's freestyle bantamweight	1st	Isidor Niflot	Defeated Louis Strebler	Defeated J. M. Cardwell	Defeated August Wester
Men's freestyle bantamweight	2nd	August Wester	Defeated Charles Stevens	Defeated Milton Whitehurst	Lost to Isidor Niflot
Men's freestyle bantamweight	3rd	Louis Strebler	Lost to Isidor Niflot	3rd place match details unknown	
Men's freestyle bantamweight	4-6	J. M. Cardwell	Bye	Lost to Isidor Niflot	3rd place match details unknown
Men's freestyle bantamweight	4-6	Charles Stevens	Lost to August Wester	3rd place match details unknown	
Men's freestyle bantamweight	4-6	Milton Whitehurst	Defeated Frederick Ferguson	Lost to August Wester	3rd place match details unknown
Men's freestyle bantamweight	7th	Frederick Ferguson	Lost to Milton Whitehurst	did not advance	

Event	Place	Wrestler	Round of 16	Quarterfinals	Semifinals	Final
Men's freestyle featherweight	1st	Benjamin Bradshaw	Bye	Defeated Frederick Ferguson	Defeated Charles Clapper	Defeated Theodore McLear
Men's freestyle featherweight	2nd	Theodore McLear	Bye	Defeated Louis Strebler	Defeated Dietrich Wortmann	Lost to Benjamin Bradshaw
Men's freestyle featherweight	3rd	Charles Clapper	Bye	Defeated J. C. Babcok	Lost to Benjamin Bradshaw	3rd place match details unknown
Men's freestyle featherweight	4th	Frederick Ferguson	Bye	Lost to Benjamin Bradshaw	3rd place match details unknown	
Men's freestyle featherweight	5-6	Louis Strebler	Bye	Lost to Theodore McLear	3rd place match details unknown	
Men's freestyle featherweight	5-6	Dietrich Wortmann	Bye	Defeated Max Miller	Lost to Theodore McLear	3rd place match details unknown
Men's freestyle featherweight	7-8	J. C. Babcock	Defeated Hugo Toeppen	Lost to Charles Clapper	Did not advance	
Men's freestyle featherweight	7-8	Max Miller	Bye	Lost to Dietrich Wortmann	Did not advance	
Men's freestyle featherweight	9th	Hugo Toeppen	Lost to J. C. Babcock	Did not advance		
Men's freestyle lightweight	1st	Otto Roehm	Defeated Frederick Koenig	Defeated Fred Hussman	Defeated Albert Zirkel	Defeated Rudolph Tesing
Men's freestyle lightweight	2nd	Rudolph Tesing	Bye	Defeated Rudolph Wolken	Defeated William Hennessy	Lost to Otto Roehm
Men's freestyle lightweight	3rd	Albert Zirkel	Bye	Defeated Charles Haberkorn	Lost to Otto Roehm	3rd place match details unknown
Men's freestyle lightweight	4-7	William Hennessy	Bye	Defeated Charles Eng	Lost to Rudolph Tesing	3rd place match details unknown
Men's freestyle lightweight	4-7	Fred Hussman	Defeated Jerry Winholtz	Lost to Otto Roehm	3rd place match details unknown	
Men's freestyle lightweight	4-7	Frederick Koenig	Lost to Otto Roehm	3rd place match details unknown		
Men's freestyle lightweight	4-7	Rudolph Wolken	Bye	Lost to Rudolph Tesing	3rd place match details unknown	
Men's freestyle lightweight	8-9	Charles Eng	Bye	Lost to William Hennessy	Did not advance	
Men's freestyle lightweight	8-9	Charles Haberkorn	Bye	Lost to Albert Zirkel	Did not advance	
Men's freestyle lightweight	10th	Jerry Winholtz	Lost to Fred Hussman	Did not advance		
Men's freestyle welterweight	1st	Charles Ericksen (NOR)	Bye	Defeated Jerry Winholtz	Defeated William Hennessy	Defeated William Beckmann
Men's freestyle welterweight	2nd	William Beckmann	Defeated Samuel Filler	Defeated William Schaefer	Defeated Otto Roehm	Lost to Charles Ericksen
Men's freestyle welterweight	3rd	Jerry Winholtz	Bye	Lost to Charles Ericksen	3rd place match details unknown	
Men's freestyle welterweight	4-7	Samuel Filler	Lost to William Beckmann	3rd place match details unknown		
Men's freestyle welterweight	4-7	William Hennessy	Bye	Defeated A. Mellinger	Lost to Charles Ericksen	3rd place match details unknown
Men's freestyle welterweight	4-7	Otto Roehm	Bye	Defeated Hugo Toeppen	Lost to William Beckmann	3rd place match details unknown
Men's freestyle welterweight	4-7	William Schaefer	Defeated A. J. Betchestobill	Lost to William Beckmann	3rd place match details unknown	
Men's freestyle welterweight	8-9	A. Mellinger	Bye	Lost to William Hennessy	Did not advance	
Men's freestyle welterweight	8-9	Hugo Toeppen	Bye	Lost to Otto Roehm	Did not advance	
Men's freestyle welterweight	10th	A. J. Betchestobill	Lost to William Schaefer	Did not advance		

Event	Place	Wrestler	Quarterfinals	Semifinals	Final
Men's freestyle heavyweight	1st	Bernhoff Hansen (NOR)	Defeated Fred Warmbold	Defeated William Hennessy	Defeated Frank Kugler
Men's freestyle heavyweight	2nd	Frank Kugler (GER)	Bye	Defeated Joseph Dilg	Lost to Bernhoff Hansen
Men's freestyle heavyweight	3rd	Fred Warmbold	Lost to Bernhoff Hansen	3rd place match details unknown	
Men's freestyle heavyweight	4-5	Joseph Dilg	Bye	Lost to Frank Kugler	3rd place match details unknown
Men's freestyle heavyweight	4-5	William Hennessy	Bye	Lost to Bernhoff Hansen	3rd place match details unknown

== Sources ==
- De Wael, Herman (2000). "Herman's Full Olympians".
- Wudarski, Pawel (1999). "Wyniki Igrzysk Olimpijskich" (in Polish). Archived from the original on February 16, 2009.
