= Cycling at the 1904 Summer Olympics – 25 miles =

Men's 25 miles at the Games of the III Olympiad
- Venue: Francis Field
- Date: August 5
- Competitors: 10 from 1 nation

Medalists
1st place, gold medalist(s)		Burton Downing	United States
2nd place, silver medalist(s)		Arthur F. Andrews	United States
3rd place, bronze medalist(s)		George E. Wiley	United States

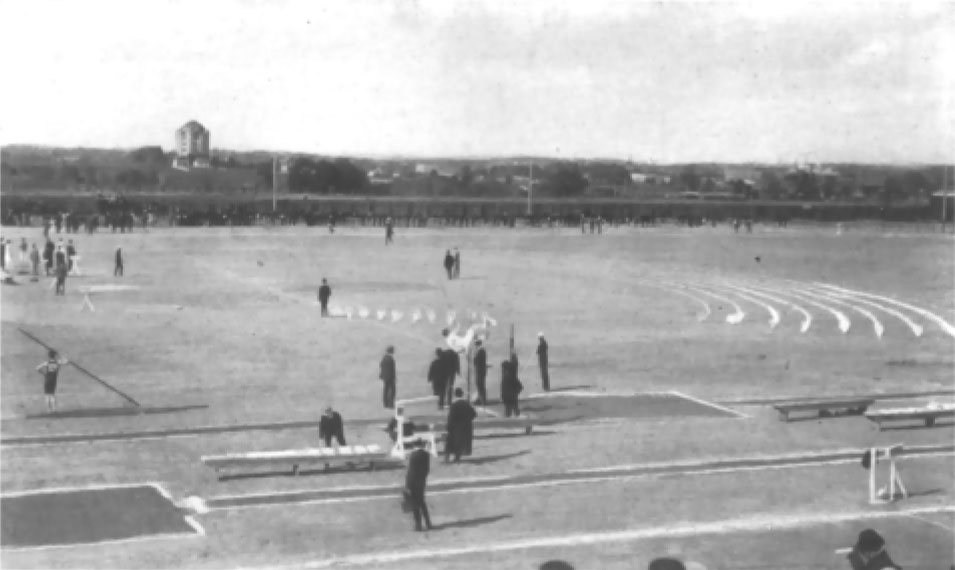
Francis Field, 1904

The 25 miles was a track cycling event held as part of the cycling programme at the 1904 Summer Olympics. It was the only time this 25.0 miles (40.2 km) event was held at the Olympics. 10 American cyclists competed.

== Results ==
=== Final ===
Only 4 of the 10 cyclists finished.

Final
Gold	Burton Downing (USA)	1:10:55.4
Silver	Arthur F. Andrews (USA)	
Bronze	George E. Wiley (USA)	
4.	Samuel LaVoice (USA)	
—	Teddy Billington (USA)	Did not finish
—	Oscar Goerke (USA)	Did not finish
—	Marcus Hurley (USA)	Did not finish
—	Julius Schaefer (USA)	Did not finish
—	Charles Schlee (USA)	Did not finish
—	Anthony Williamsen (USA)	Did not finish

== Sources ==
- Wudarski, Pawel (1999). "Wyniki Igrzysk Olimpijskich" (in Polish). Archived from the original on 16 February 2009.
