= Cycling at the 1904 Summer Olympics – 5 miles =

Men's 5 miles at the Games of the III Olympiad
- Venue: Francis Field
- Date: August 5
- Competitors: 10+ from 1 nation

Medalists
1st place, gold medalist(s)		Charles Schlee	United States
2nd place, silver medalist(s)		George E. Wiley	United States
3rd place, bronze medalist(s)		Arthur F. Andrews	United States

The 5 miles was a track cycling event held as part of the cycling programme at the 1904 Summer Olympics. It was this 5.0 miles (8,000 m) only time the event was held at the Olympics. At least 10 American cyclists competed, though the precise number is unknown.

== Results ==
=== Final ===
The top four placers are known. 5 more cyclists that did not finish the race are also known. How many other cyclists, who they were, and what their results were, are unknown.

Final
Gold	Charles Schlee (USA)	13:08.2
Silver	George E. Wiley (USA)	
Bronze	Arthur F. Andrews (USA)	
4.	Julius Schaefer (USA)	
?	Unknown competitor(s)	
—	Teddy Billington (USA)	Did not finish
—	Burton Downing (USA)	Did not finish
—	Oscar Goerke (USA)	Did not finish
—	Marcus Hurley (USA)	Did not finish
—	Joel N. McCrea (USA)	Did not finish

== Sources ==
- Wudarski, Pawel (1999). "Wyniki Igrzysk Olimpijskich" (in Polish). Archived from the original on 16 February 2009.
