= Cycling at the 1904 Summer Olympics – 2 miles =

Men's 2 miles at the Games of the III Olympiad
- Venue: Francis Field
- Date: August 3
- Competitors: 13 from 1 nation

Medalists
1st place, gold medalist(s)		Burton Downing	United States
2nd place, silver medalist(s)		Oscar Goerke	United States
3rd place, bronze medalist(s)		Marcus Hurley	United States

The 2 miles was a track cycling event held as part of the cycling programme at the 1904 Summer Olympics. It was the only time this 2.0 miles (3,200 m) event was held at the Olympics. 13 American cyclists competed.

== Results ==
=== Final ===
Final
Gold	Burton Downing (USA)	4:57.8
Silver	Oscar Goerke (USA)	
Bronze	Marcus Hurley (USA)	
4.	Teddy Billington (USA)	
5-13	Charles Schlee (USA)	
5-13	Unknown (USA)	
5-13	Unknown (USA)	
5-13	Unknown (USA)	
5-13	Unknown (USA)	
5-13	Unknown (USA)	
5-13	Unknown (USA)	
5-13	Unknown (USA)	
5-13	Unknown (USA)	

== Sources ==
- Wudarski, Pawel (1999). "Wyniki Igrzysk Olimpijskich" (in Polish). Archived from the original on 16 February 2009.
