= Cycling at the 1904 Summer Olympics – 1/3 mile =

Men's 1/3 mile at the Games of the III Olympiad
- Venue: Francis Field
- Dates: August 4 August 5
- Competitors: 10 from 1 nation

Medalists
1st place, gold medalist(s)		Marcus Hurley	United States
2nd place, silver medalist(s)		Burton Downing	United States
3rd place, bronze medalist(s)		Teddy Billington	United States

The 1/3 mile was a track cycling event held as part of the cycling programme at the 1904 Summer Olympics. It was the only time this .333 miles (536 m) event was held at the Olympics. 10 American cyclists competed. The names of 4 of the competitors are not known.

== Results ==
=== Heats ===
The top two finishers in each heat advanced to the semifinals. The identities of the 6 cyclists competing in the third and fourth heats are unknown, though Marcus Hurley and Burton Downing were among the 4 who advanced to the semifinals. The 2 eliminated cyclists are unknown, as are the 2 who moved on along with Hurley and Downing.

Heat 1
1.	Charles Schlee (USA)	QS
2.	Teddy Billington (USA)	QS
Heat 2
1.	Oscar Goerke (USA)	QS
2.	Fred Grinham (USA)	QS
Heat 3
1.	Unknown (USA)	QS
2.	Unknown (USA)	QS
3.	Unknown (USA)	
Heat 4
1.	Unknown (USA)	QS
2.	Unknown (USA)	QS
3.	Unknown (USA)	

=== Semifinals ===
The top two finishers in each semifinal advanced to the final. Hurley and Downing were the two winners in the second semifinal; the two other cyclists who had advanced from heats 3 and 4 took third and fourth place in that semifinal but their names are unknown.

Semifinal 1
1.	Teddy Billington (USA)	50.2	QF
2.	Charles Schlee (USA)		QF
3-4	Oscar Goerke (USA)		
3-4	Fred Grinham (USA)		
Semifinal 2
1.	Marcus Hurley (USA)	44.2	QF
2.	Burton Downing (USA)		QF
3-4	Unknown (USA)		
3-4	Unknown (USA)		

=== Final ===
Final
Gold	Marcus Hurley (USA)	43.8
Silver	Burton Downing (USA)	
Bronze	Teddy Billington (USA)	
4.	Charles Schlee (USA)	

== Sources ==
- Wudarski, Pawel (1999). "Wyniki Igrzysk Olimpijskich" (in Polish). Archived from the original on 16 February 2009.
