= Fred Grinham =

American cyclist

Personal information
- Born: 22 November 1881 London, England
- Died: 19 March 1972 (aged 90) Colorado Springs, Colorado, United States

Cycling career
- Sport: Cycling
- Discipline: track cycling

Fred Grinham (22 November 1881 – 19 March 1972) was an American cyclist, boxer, auto racer, and businessman. He competed in three cycling events at the 1904 Summer Olympics before becoming a multi-time millionaire businessman and municipal employee.

== Early life ==
Born in London, England, Grinham emigrated to the United States with his family at the age of 12 and became an American citizen in 1900.

== Sporting career ==
Grinham was a member of the United States track cycling delegation at the 1904 Summer Olympics. Grinham competed in the 1/4 mile, 1/3 mile, and 1/2 mile competitions, but failed to advance from the heats in any of his events. Grinham also competed in the non-metal 1 mile Handicap event and finished in third place.

Following the Olympics, Grinham transitioned to a career in auto racing. Grinham quickly found success, and was known as being one of the best racers in the city of St. Louis, winning multiple races at the St. Louis Fairgrounds Park. He was known as being a daring and courageous racer who was willing to take chances.

== Business career ==
Buoyed by the success he had in auto racing, Grinham soon turned to running his own car dealerships. Known by the St. Louis media to have a close relationship with Packard, Grinham amassed a small fortune and retired in 1917 as a millionaire. However, bad investments led to Grinham losing his fortune in the 1921 financial crisis, and he was forced to once again work as a salesman.

Forced to start over once again, Grinham formed the Grinham-Johnson motor sales company and became a Chevrolet dealer. Grinham also partnered with a trio of St. Louis businessmen on a device designed to reburn the exhaust gases from internal combustion motors found in cars. In 1925, Grinham decided to sell the company and move to Coral Gables, Florida in order to enter the real estate field during the middle of the land boom taking place in Florida at the time.

While in Florida, Grinham engaged in a number of real estate dealings and became president of the Coral Gables Country Club. However, the busting of the real estate market at the end of the land boom caused Grinham to lose his fortune once again.

== Final years and death ==
After losing his second fortune, Grinham became the occupational license collector for the city of Coral Gables, retiring in 1958 at the age of 76. When asked what he would do in his third retirement, Grinham merely replied "sit". Retiring in Florida, Grinham died on March 19, 1972 in Colorado Springs while visiting his grandchildren.

== Personal life ==
In 1905, Grinham was credited with saving multiple lives after a fire broke out at a hotel in Hyannisport, Massachusetts.
