= Boxing at the 1904 Summer Olympics – Flyweight =

Men's flyweight boxing at the Games of the III Olympiad
- Venue: Physical Culture Gymnasium (Washington University in St. Louis)
- Date: September 22, 1904
- Competitors: 2 from 1 nation

Medalists
1st place, gold medalist(s)		George Finnegan	United States
2nd place, silver medalist(s)		Miles Burke	United States

The flyweight was the lightest boxing weight class held as part of the boxing programme at the 1904 Summer Olympics. The competition was held on September 22, 1904. It was the first time the event, like all other boxing events, was held in Olympic competition.

== Results ==
Final
1	George Finnegan (USA)	TKO
2	Miles Burke (USA)	1st

== Sources ==
- Wudarski, Pawel (1999). "Wyniki Igrzysk Olimpijskich" (in Polish).
