= Gymnastics at the 1904 Summer Olympics – Men's rope climbing =

Men's rope climbing at the Games of the III Olympiad
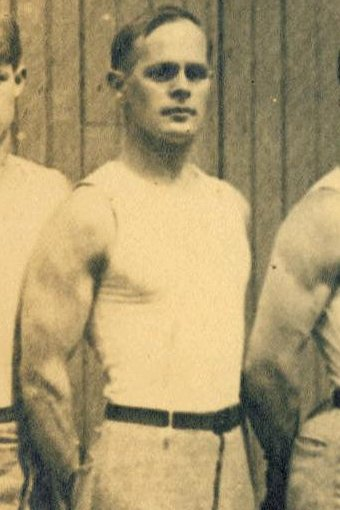
- George Eyser
- Venue: Francis Olympic Field
- Date: 28 October 1904
- Competitors: ? from ? nations
- Winning time: 7.0

Medalists
1st place, gold medalist(s)		George Eyser; United States
2nd place, silver medalist(s)		Charles Krause; United States
3rd place, bronze medalist(s)		Emil Voigt; United States

The men's rope climbing was an artistic gymnastics event held as part of the gymnastics programme at the 1904 Summer Olympics. It was the second time the event had been included in the Olympics. An unknown number of gymnasts competed, but only three are known, all of whom were American. The competition was held on Friday, 28 October 1904. George Eyser won the event, with Charles Krause second and Emil Voigt third.

== Background ==
This was the second appearance of the event, which was held four times. The event had been held in 1896 and would appear again in 1924 and 1932. The five-time reigning AAU champion, Edward Kunath, did not compete.

== Competition format ==
The rope climb was set at a height of 25 feet (7.62 metres). Each contestant had three attempts. The fastest of the three climbs counted. Unlike in 1896, there were no style points; only speed counted.

== Schedule ==
Date	Time	Round
Friday, 28 October 1904		Final

== Results ==
Rank	Gymnast	Nation	Time
1st place, gold medalist(s)	George Eyser	United States	7.0
2nd place, silver medalist(s)	Charles Krause	United States	7.2
3rd place, bronze medalist(s)	Emil Voigt	United States	9.8

== Sources ==
- De Wael, Herman (2000). "Herman's Full Olympians".
- Wudarski, Pawel (1999). "Wyniki Igrzysk Olimpijskich" (in Polish).
