= Boxing at the 1904 Summer Olympics – Featherweight =

Men's featherweight boxing at the Games of the III Olympiad
- Venue: Physical Culture Gymnasium (Washington University in St. Louis)
- Dates: September 21, 1904 (semifinal); September 22, 1904 (final)
- Competitors: 3 from 1 nation

Medalists
1st place, gold medalist(s)		Oliver Kirk	United States
2nd place, silver medalist(s)		Frank Haller	United States
3rd place, bronze medalist(s)		Frederick Gilmore	United States

The featherweight was the third-lightest boxing weight class held as part of the boxing programme at the 1904 Summer Olympics. The competition was held on September 21, 1904 and on September 22, 1904. It was the first time the event, like all other boxing events, was held in Olympic competition. Featherweights had to be less than 56.7 kilograms. There were three entrants in this competition.

== Results ==
Semifinal; September 21			Final; September 22
			1	Oliver Kirk (USA)	W
2	Frank Haller (USA)	W		Frank Haller (USA)	L
3	Frederick Gilmore (USA)	L

== Sources ==
- Wudarski, Pawel (1999). "Wyniki Igrzysk Olimpijskich" (in Polish).
