= Wrestling at the 1904 Summer Olympics – Men's freestyle flyweight =

Men's flyweight freestyle wrestling at the Games of the III Olympiad
- Venue: Francis Field
- Date: October 15, 1904
- Competitors: 3 from 1 nation

Medalists
1st place, gold medalist(s)		George Mehnert	United States
2nd place, silver medalist(s)		Gustave Bauer	United States
3rd place, bronze medalist(s)		William Nelson	United States

The flyweight was the second lightest freestyle wrestling weight class held as part of the wrestling programme at the 1904 Summer Olympics. It included wrestlers weighing 105 to 115 pounds (47.6 to 52.2 kg). It was the first time the event, like all other freestyle wrestling events, was held in Olympic competition. Three wrestlers competed.

== Results ==
First Round
Decision (3 overtimes)
Gustave Bauer (USA)
William Nelson (USA) (bronze)

Final
Decision (15:00)
Gustave Bauer (USA) (silver)
George Mehnert (USA) (gold)

== Sources ==
- Wudarski, Pawel (1999). "Wyniki Igrzysk Olimpijskich" (in Polish).
