= Boxing at the 1904 Summer Olympics – Heavyweight =

Men's heavyweight boxing at the Games of the III Olympiad
- Venue: Physical Culture Gymnasium (Washington University in St. Louis)
- Dates: September 21, 1904 (semifinal); September 22, 1904 (final)
- Competitors: 3 from 1 nation

Medalists
1st place, gold medalist(s)		Samuel Berger	United States
2nd place, silver medalist(s)		Charles Mayer	United States
3rd place, bronze medalist(s)		William Michaels	United States

The heavyweight was the heaviest boxing weight class held as part of the boxing programme at the 1904 Summer Olympics. The competition was held on September 21, 1904 and on September 22, 1904. It was the first time the event, like all other boxing events, was held in Olympic competition.

== Results ==
Semifinal; September 21			Final; September 22
			1	Samuel Berger (USA)	W
2	Samuel Berger (USA)	KO3		Charles Mayer (USA)	L
3	William Michaels (USA)	L

== Sources ==
- Wudarski, Pawel (1999). "Wyniki Igrzysk Olimpijskich" (in Polish).
