= Charles Schlee =

American cyclist

Personal information
- Full name: Charles Wilhelm Daniel Schlee
- Born: July 21, 1873 Copenhagen, Denmark
- Died: January 5, 1947 (aged 73) Cambridge, Maryland, United States

Cycling career
- Sport: Cycling
- Discipline: Track
- Role: Rider
Medal record
Men's track cycling
Representing the United States
Olympic Games
Gold medal – first place	1904 St. Louis	5 miles

Charles Wilhelm Daniel Schlee (July 21, 1873 – January 5, 1947) was a Danish American racing cyclist who competed 1902–1911, mostly in New Jersey. He was born in Copenhagen, Denmark and died in Cambridge, Maryland.

He competed in Cycling at the 1904 Summer Olympics in St Louis, Missouri and won the gold medal in the 5 mile race.

He also competed in the following events:

- 1/3 mile - fourth position
- 1/2 mile - eliminated in the semifinals
- 1 mile - eliminated in the first round
- 2 miles - place unknown
- 25 miles - did not finish
