= Frederick Garfield Gilmore =

American boxer (1887–1969)

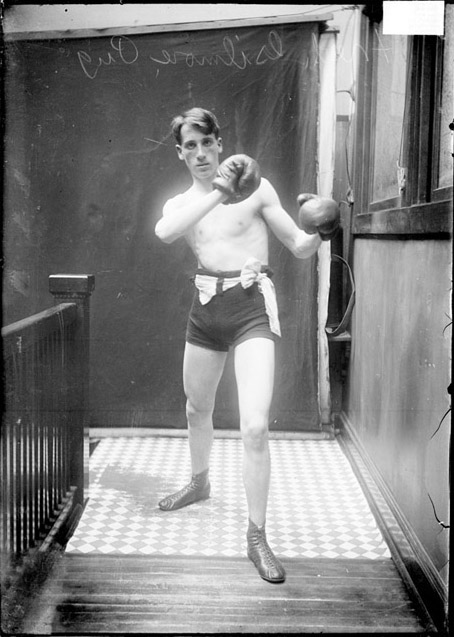

Medal record

Men's boxing

Representing the United States

Olympic Games
| Bronze medal – third place | 1904 St. Louis | Featherweight |

Frederick Garfield Gilmore (May 22, 1887 – March 17, 1969) was an American featherweight professional boxer who competed in the early twentieth century. He won a bronze medal in Boxing at the 1904 Summer Olympics, losing to Frank Haller in the semi-final.

He was born in Montreal, Quebec, Canada. He lived at least part of his life in Cook County, Illinois with his wife, Lempi Riippa. He died in Melrose Park, IL.
