= Stuart Stickney =

American golfer

Personal information
- Full name: Stuart Grosvenor Stickney
- Nickname: "Stu"
- Born: March 9, 1877 St. Louis, Missouri, U.S.
- Died: September 24, 1932 (aged 55) St. Louis, Missouri, U.S.

Career
- Sport: Golf
Medal record
Men's golf
Representing United States
Olympic Games
Silver medal – second place	1904 St. Louis	Team

Stuart Grosvenor "Stu" Stickney (March 9, 1877 – September 24, 1932) was an American golfer.

== Career ==
Stickney competed in the 1904 Summer Olympics. He was part of the American team which won the silver medal. He finished 15th in this competition. In the individual competition, Stickney finished first in the qualification but was eliminated in the second round of the match play.

Stickney also won the 1913 Trans-Mississippi Amateur.

== Amateur wins ==
- 1913 Trans-Mississippi Amateur
