= Simeon Price =

American golfer

Personal information
- Full name: Simeon Taylor Price Jr.
- Nickname: "Sim"
- Born: May 16, 1882 St. Louis, Missouri, U.S.
- Died: March 16, 1945 (aged 62) Washington, D.C.

Career
- Sport: Golf
Medal record
Men's golf
Representing United States
Olympic Games
Bronze medal – third place	1904 St. Louis	Team

Simeon Taylor "Sim" Price Jr. (May 16, 1882 – March 16, 1945) was an American golfer who competed in the 1904 Summer Olympics.

== Career ==
He was born in Maine and died in Washington, D.C. In 1904 he was part of the American team which won the bronze medal. He finished 20th in this competition. In the individual competition he finished 19th in the qualification and was eliminated in the first round of the match play.

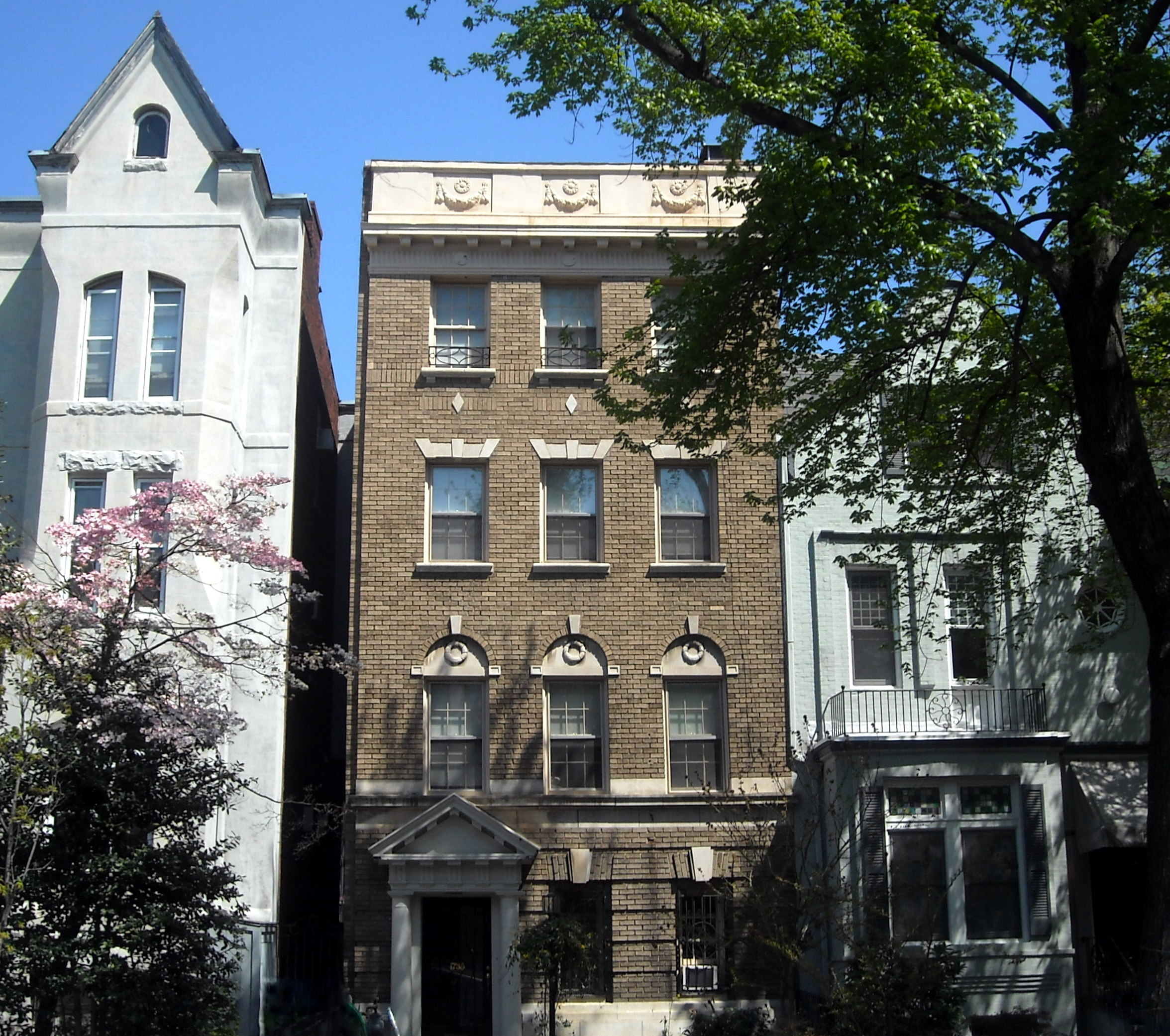
Price's former home in Washington, D.C.
