= Burt McKinnie =

American golfer (1879–1946)

Personal information
- Full name: Burt Plumb McKinnie
- Born: January 17, 1879 Pleasanton, Kansas, U.S.
- Died: November 22, 1946 (aged 67) Millville, New Jersey, U.S.

Career
- Sport: Golf
Medal record
Men's golf
Representing United States
Olympic Games
Silver medal – second place	1904 St. Louis	Team
Bronze medal – third place	1904 St. Louis	Individual

Burt Plumb McKinnie (January 17, 1879 – November 22, 1946) was an American golfer who competed in the 1904 Summer Olympics.

== Career ==
In 1904, he was part of the American team which won the silver medal. He finished 17th in this competition. In the individual competition he finished 11th in the qualification and won the bronze medal after losing in the semi-finals.
