= Mason Phelps =

American golfer

- Phelps in 1908

Medal record

Men's golf

Representing the United States

Olympic Games
| Gold medal – first place | 1904 St. Louis | Team competition |

Mason Elliott Phelps (December 7, 1885 – September 2, 1945) was an American golfer who competed in the 1904 Summer Olympics.

== Career ==
In 1904, Phelps was part of the American team which won the gold medal. He finished 15th in this competition. In the individual competition, he finished sixth in the qualification and was eliminated in the quarter-finals of the match play.

Phelps won the 1908 and 1910 Western Amateur.
