= Claude Holgate =

American wrestler

Personal information
- Full name: Claude Elmo Holgate
- Born: April 22, 1872 Irvington, New Jersey, U.S.
- Died: March 29, 1937 (aged 64) Newark, New Jersey, U.S.

Claude Elmo Holgate (April 22, 1872 – March 29, 1937) was an American wrestler. He competed in the 1904 Summer Olympics. He finished in 4th place in the freestyle wrestling light flyweight class.
