= Miles Burke =

American boxer

Medal record

Men's boxing

Representing the United States

Olympic Games
Silver medal – second place	1904 St. Louis	Flyweight

Miles J. Burke (January 15, 1885 – December 25, 1928) was an American flyweight boxer who competed in the early twentieth century. He died in St. Louis, Missouri.

Burke won a silver medal in Boxing at the 1904 Summer Olympics, losing to fellow American George Finnegan. Finnegan was the only other athlete competing in the weight class. Allegedly, Burke weighed 108 pounds for the bout, three pounds over the weight limit, but was still allowed to compete, perhaps because no other opponent could be found.

== 1904 Olympic results ==
Below are the results of Miles Burke, an American flyweight boxer who competed at the 1904 St. Louis Olympics:

- Final: lost to George Finnegan (United States) by a first-round technical knockout (was awarded silver medal)

== Sources ==
- The Complete Book of The Olympics
- Miles Burke at databaseOlympics.com
