= Emil Voigt (gymnast) =

American gymnast

Olympic medal record

Men's Gymnastics
Silver medal – second place	1904 St Louis	Club swinging
Bronze medal – third place	1904 St Louis	Rings
Bronze medal – third place	1904 St Louis	Rope climbing

Emil Voigt (December 15, 1879 – February 26, 1946) was an American gymnast who competed in the 1904 Summer Olympics.

In 1904 he won the silver medal in the club swinging event and bronze medals in the rings event and rope climbing event. He was also fourth in the gymnastics team event, 42nd in the gymnastics triathlon event, 60th in the gymnastics all-around event, and 85th in the athletics triathlon event. He was a member of the Concordia Turnverein in St. Louis.
