= Harold Fraser (golfer) =

American golfer

Personal information
- Full name: Harold William Fraser
- Nickname: "Harry"
- Born: October 26, 1872 Woodstock, Ontario, Canada
- Died: January 4, 1945 (aged 72) Ottawa Hills, Ohio, U.S.

Career
- Sport: Golf
Medal record
Men's golf
Representing United States
Olympic Games
Bronze medal – third place	1904 St. Louis	Team

Harold William "Harry" Fraser (October 26, 1872 – January 4, 1945) was an American golfer who competed in the 1904 Summer Olympics.

== Career ==
In 1904 he was part of the American team which won the bronze medal. In the individual competition he finished 29th in the qualification and was eliminated in the first round of the match play.

He was born in Windsor, Ontario and died in Ottawa Hills, Ohio.
