= Arthur F. Andrews =

American cyclist

Arthur Andrews
Personal information
- Full name: Arthur Fleming Andrews
- Born: September 1, 1876 Muncie, Indiana, U.S.
- Died: March 20, 1930 (aged 53) Long Beach, California, U.S.

Cycling career
- Sport: Cycling
Medal record
Men's track cycling
Representing the United States
Olympic Games
Silver medal – second place	1904 St. Louis	25 miles
Bronze medal – third place	1904 St. Louis	5 miles

Arthur Fleming Andrews (September 1, 1876 – March 20, 1930) was an American cyclist who competed in the early twentieth century.

He competed in cycling at the 1904 Summer Olympics in Missouri and won the silver in the 25 mile race and a bronze in the 5 mile race. He also reached the semifinals of the quarter mile race and was eliminated in the first round of the half mile race.

He was born in Muncie, Indiana and died in Long Beach, California.
