= Daniel Sawyer =

American golfer (1882–1937)

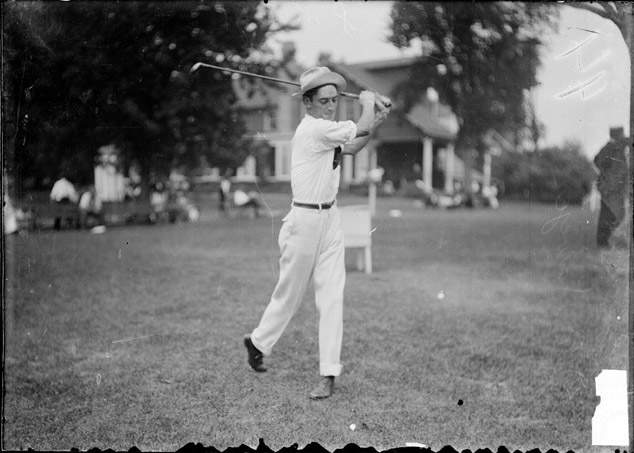
- Sawyer in 1905

Personal information
- Full name: Daniel Edward Sawyer
- Nickname: "Ned"
- Born: June 20, 1882 Pine Island, Minnesota, U.S.
- Died: July 5, 1937 (aged 55) Clarendon Hills, Illinois, U.S.

Career
- Sport: Golf
Medal record
Men's golf
Representing the United States
Olympic Games
Gold medal – first place	1904 St. Louis	Team

Daniel Edward "Ned" Sawyer (June 20, 1882 – July 5, 1937) was an American golfer who competed in the 1904 Summer Olympics.

== Golf career ==
In 1904 Sawyer was part of the American team that won the gold medal. He finished second in this competition. In the individual competition, he finished ninth in the qualification and was eliminated in the quarter-finals of the match play.

Sawyer won the 1906 Western Amateur after finishing runner-up in 1904 and finished runner-up in the 1905 U.S. Amateur.
