= Gustave Bauer =

American wrestler (1884–1947)

Gustav Bauer
Personal information
- Full name: Gustave George Bauer
- Born: April 3, 1884 Newark, New Jersey, U.S.
- Died: February 15, 1947 (aged 62) Irvington, New Jersey, U.S.
Medal record
Men's freestyle wrestling
Representing the United States
Olympic Games
Silver medal – second place	1904 St. Louis	Flyweight

Gustave George Bauer (April 3, 1884 – February 15, 1947) was an American wrestler who competed in the 1904 Summer Olympics. In 1904, he won a silver medal in the freestyle flyweight category. He was born in Newark, New Jersey.
