= William O'Connor (fencer) =

American fencer (1864–1939)

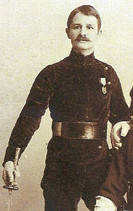

Personal information
- Full name: William Scott O'Connor
- Born: Pittsburgh, Pennsylvania, U.S.
Medal record
Olympic Games
Silver medal – second place	1904 St Louis	singlestick

William Scott O'Connor (May 23, 1864 – January 16, 1939) was an American épée and foil fencer who competed in the 1904 Summer Olympics. He won the silver medal in the singlestick competition. He was born in Pittsburgh, Pennsylvania and died in Manhattan.
