= Paul Gleeson (tennis) =

American tennis player

Paul Gleason
- Full name: Thomas Paul Gleason
- Born: March 31, 1880 St. Louis, Missouri, United States
- Died: November 26, 1956 (aged 76) Richmond Heights, Missouri, United States

Thomas Paul Gleeson (March 31, 1880 – November 26, 1956) was an American tennis player. He competed in the men's doubles event at the 1904 Summer Olympics.
