= Allan Lard =

American golfer (1866–1946)

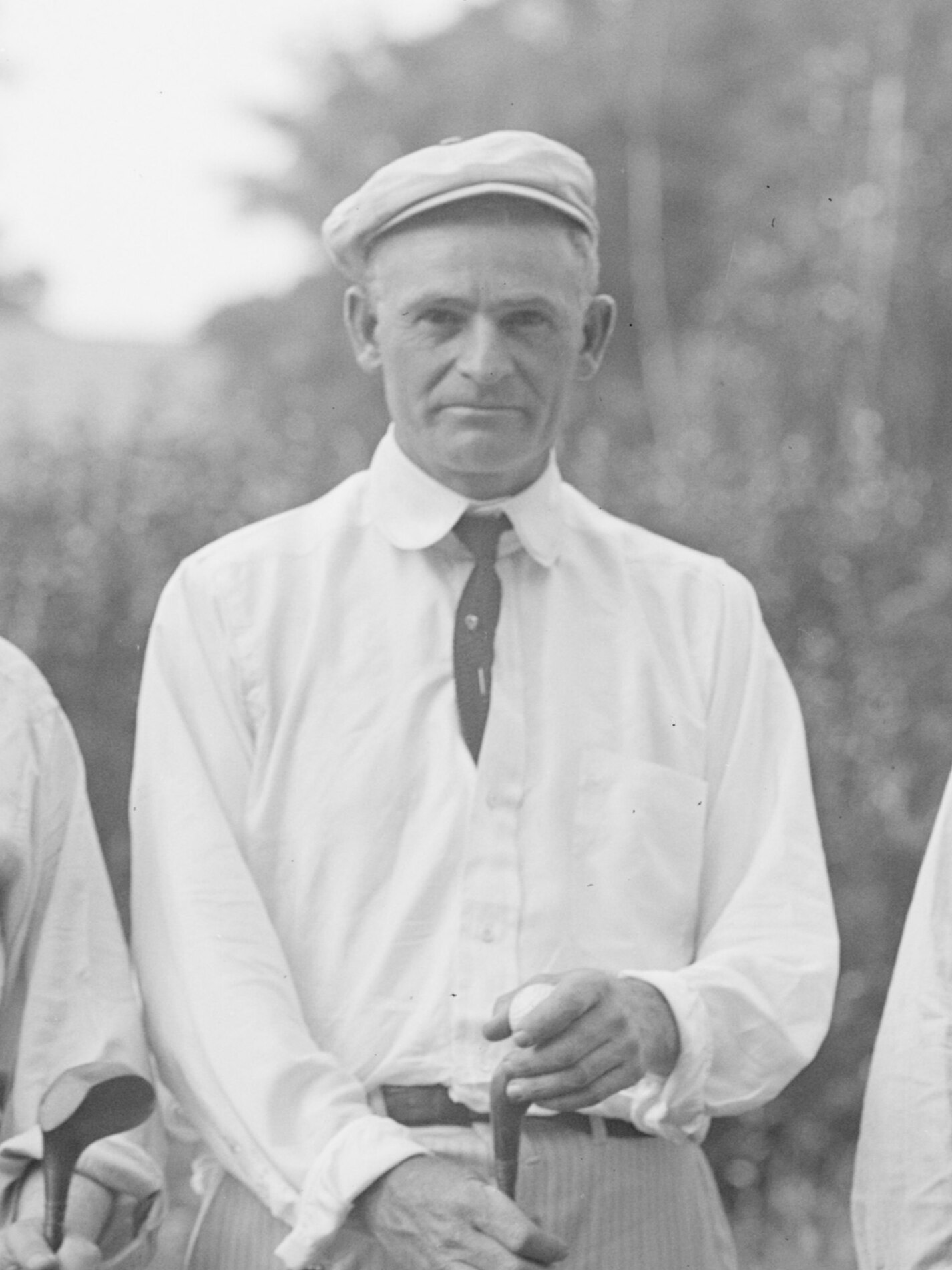
- Lard in 1909

Personal information
- Full name: Allan Edward Lard
- Nationality: United States
- Born: August 6, 1866 Lexington, Kentucky, U.S.
- Died: January 22, 1946 (aged 79) Washington, D.C., U.S.

Career
- Sport: Golf
- Status: Amateur
Medal record
Men's golf
Representing United States
Olympic Games
Bronze medal – third place	1904 St. Louis	Team

Allan Edward Lard (August 6, 1866 – January 22, 1946) was an American golfer who competed in the 1904 Summer Olympics.

== Career ==
He was born in Lexington, Kentucky. In 1904, Lard was part of the American team which won the bronze medal. He finished sixth in this competition. In the individual competition, he finished 29th in the qualification and was eliminated in the second round of the match play. Lard won the North and South Amateur in 1907 and 1908.
