= Robert Hunter (golfer) =

American golfer

- Hunter in 1908

Personal information
- Born: November 20, 1886 Chicago, Illinois, U.S.
- Died: March 28, 1971 (aged 84) Santa Barbara, California, U.S.
- Education: Yale

Sport
- Country: United States
- Sport: Golf
Medal record
Men's golf
Representing the United States
Olympic Games
Gold medal – first place	1904 St. Louis	Team

Robert Edward Hunter (November 20, 1886 – March 28, 1971) was an American amateur golfer who competed in the 1904 Summer Olympics.

== Career ==
In 1904, Hunter was part of the American team which won the gold medal. He finished fourth in this competition. In the individual competition he finished 14th in the qualification and was eliminated in the second round of the match play.

Hunter won the collegiate championship in 1910.
