= Harold Kauffman =

American tennis player

- Born: December 20, 1875 St. Louis, Missouri, United States
- Died: December 9, 1936 (aged 60) St. Louis, Missouri, United States

Harold Kauffman (December 20, 1875 – December 9, 1936) was an American tennis player. He competed in the men's doubles event at the 1904 Summer Olympics.
