= Edwin Hunter (sportsman) =

American sportsman

Personal information
- Born: March 25, 1874 Fond du Lac, Wisconsin, United States
- Died: March 30, 1935 (aged 61) St. Joseph, Michigan, United States

Sport
- Sport: Golf, tennis

Edwin Hunter (March 25, 1874 – March 30, 1935) was an American golf and tennis player. He competed in the individual golf event and the men's doubles tennis tournament at the 1904 Summer Olympics.
