= Frank Haller =

American boxer

Medal record

Men's boxing

Representing the United States

Olympic Games
Silver medal – second place	1904 St. Louis	Featherweight

Frank Bee Haller (January 6, 1883 – April 30, 1939) was an American featherweight professional boxer who competed in the early twentieth century. He won a silver medal in Boxing at the 1904 Summer Olympics, beating fellow American Frederick Gilmore, but losing to Oliver Kirk in the final.

He was born in San Francisco, California and died in St. Louis, Missouri.
