= William Michaels =

American boxer

Medal record

Men's boxing

Representing the United States

Olympic Games
Bronze medal – third place	1904 St. Louis	Heavyweight

William Mayes Michaels (July 13, 1876 – 1934) was an American professional heavyweight boxer who competed in the early twentieth century. He was born in Alcoa, Tennessee. Michaels won a bronze medal in Boxing at the 1904 Summer Olympics losing to Charles Mayer in the semi-finals.
