= Kenneth Jewett =

American boxer

Personal information
- Born: October 2, 1880 Fitchburg, Massachusetts, United States
- Died: November 28, 1944 (aged 64) Boston, Massachusetts, United States

Sport
- Sport: boxer

Kenneth Jewett (October 2, 1880 – November 28, 1944) was an American boxer. He competed in the men's lightweight event at the 1904 Summer Olympics.
