= William Nelson (wrestler) =

American wrestler

Medal record

Men's freestyle wrestling

Representing the United States

Olympic Games
Bronze medal – third place	1904 St. Louis	Flyweight

William L. Nelson was an American wrestler who competed in the 1904 Summer Olympics. At the 1904 Summer Olympics, he won the bronze medal in the freestyle wrestling flyweight class. Nelson wrestled for St. George's AC in New York, New York.
