= Albert Bechestobill =

American wrestler (1879–1959)

Personal information
- Born: March 27, 1879 St. Louis, Missouri, U.S.
- Died: July 1, 1959 (aged 80) St. Louis, Missouri, U.S.

Sport
- Sport: Wrestling
- Event: Freestyle

Albert Bechestobill (March 27, 1879 – July 1, 1959) was an American wrestler. He competed in the men's freestyle welterweight at the 1904 Summer Olympics.
