= William Stickney (golfer) =

American golfer

Personal information
- Full name: William Arthur Stickney
- Nickname: "Art"
- Born: May 25, 1879 St. Louis, Missouri, U.S.
- Died: September 12, 1944 (aged 65) St. Louis, Missouri, U.S.

Career
- Sport: Golf
Medal record
Men's golf
Representing United States
Olympic Games
Silver medal – second place	1904 St. Louis	Team

William Arthur "Art" Stickney (May 25, 1879 – September 12, 1944) was an American golfer.

== Career ==
In 1904, Stickney competed in the 1904 Summer Olympics. He was part of the American team which won the silver medal. He finished 17th in this competition. In the individual competition he finished fourth in the qualification and was eliminated in the second round of the match play.
