= Hugo Toeppen =

American wrestler

Personal information
- Nationality: Polish-born American citizen
- Born: Hugo Anton Toeppen; October 8, 1853 Marcinkowo, Poland
- Died: September 26, 1933 (aged 79) Riverside, California, U.S.
- Education: University of Leipzig PHd. University of Toronto MD
- Occupation: Family physician
- Spouse: Anna Amalia Henriette (Weißermel)
- Relative: Manfred Toeppen ('04 Olympian)

Sport
- Sport: Ice Skating, Gymnastics, Wrestling
- Events: Freestyle wrestling, ('04 Olympics)
- Club: Concordia Turnverein, St. Louis

Hugo Anton Toeppen (October 8, 1853 – September 26, 1933) was a Polish-born American wrestler, who competed in the men's freestyle welterweight competition at the 1904 St. Louis Olympics. He was 51 years and 6 days old when he competed at the Olympic Games, making him the oldest wrestler in Olympic history. In a rare pairing, his son Manfred also competed in the St. Louis Olympics, winning a bronze medal in water polo. After emigrating to America from Germany in 1885 at 32, he obtained his medical degree from the University of Toronto, and beginning in 1895 practiced family medicine in South St. Louis for over thirty years.

Hugo Toeppen spent his first nine years in the town of Udzikou where he was tutored in his youth by a governess, first undertaking the study of Latin from a nearby farmer at age eight. At the age of nine, he began the study of Greek and other subjects in the city of Hohenstein, where his mother moved the family after the death of his father. By 14, he worked as a Latin tutor to help earn money for his family. Pursuing higher education, he graduated the University of Leipzig with a Doctorate, learning and developing his skills in five modern languages. He became a journalist, and travelled to South America, writing a book about his travels. While at University in Leipzig, he was part of a Turnverein, or gymnasium, an association he continued throughout his life.

== Primary career ==
After emigrating to America in 1885 at the age of 32, he obtained his medical degree in Canada around 1892, likely from the University of Toronto. He practiced family medicine in South St. Louis for over thirty years beginning in 1895, often making house calls in his early days using his horse and buggy.

== Marriage ==
In his youth, Toeppen was married to Anna Amalia Henriette (Weißermel) Toeppen in Leipzig, Germany possibly during his time at the University. The couple had a daughter Herta Adeline Toeppen, an accomplished long distance swimmer, and a son Manfred Hugo Kurt Toeppen, a 1904 St. Louis Olympic water polo bronze medalist who became a consulting engineer for public utility companies. Like the rest of the family, their youngest son Herwig Columbus Toeppen was an accomplished swimmer and gymnast.

== 1904 St. Louis Olympics ==
Toeppen competed in the men's freestyle welterweight competition at the 1904 St. Louis Olympics at Washington University's Francis Field during the St. Louis World's Fair from October 14-15. Ten participants, all from the United States, competed. In the second match of the Quarterfinals, Toeppen lost to Otto Roehm in a 3:30 Fall. Staged as a single elimination tournament, competitors who lost their first match, did not advance. Charles Erickson, won the gold for America, though he was technically still a Norwegian citizen at the time of the Olympics, Bill Beckman took the silver medal, and Jerry Winholtz took the bronze.

=== Athletics ===
Shortly before coming to America, he competed in an international skating competition in Hamburg, Germany, where he finished fourth behind two Scandinavians and the world champion, Norwegian Axel Paulson. Beginning in 1885 when he arrived in America and continuing for a span of nearly forty years, he trained and competed for the Concordia Turnverein in St. Louis, a gymnastics and sports club primarily composed of German-Americans, where he was active as both an athlete and administrator, holding various administrative roles, including the club Presidency. Accomplished in several sports, he was an excellent horseman and swimmer, and in addition to his achievements in gymnastics and wrestling, he won a silver cup in 1929 from the American Athletic Union's Western Division for his work furthering the sport of ice skating.

Hugo relocated to California in the Riverside area around 1931 after his sight began failing.

Toeppen died at 79 on September 26, 1933 at his home in Riverside, California, having moved there only two years earlier from St. Louis due to his failing vision.
