= Oscar Schwab =

American cyclist

Personal information
- Born: June 24, 1882 Paris, France
- Died: August 24, 1955 (aged 73)

Cycling career
- Sport: Cycling

Oscar Schwab (June 24, 1882 – August 24, 1955) was an American cyclist. He competed in the men's quarter mile event at the 1904 Summer Olympics.

== Career ==
Oscar Schwab was born in Paris and grew up in Switzerland, as his mother was Swiss. He was later adopted by his stepfather, an American, and became a U.S. citizen in 1900. He was fluent in several languages. After finishing school, he moved to the United States in 1897 and trained in an iron construction shop; in the afternoons, he met with his friends to cycle. From 1903 onward, he competed in minor amateur races. In 1904, he participated in the quarter-mile sprint at the Olympic Games in St. Louis but was eliminated in the first lap.

Oscar Schwab married in Berlin in 1912 and moved back to the US in 1926. After World War II, he returned to Germany for a time and lived in Berlin again. He worked as a pacemaker in motor-paced cycling races and spent the entire 1947 season pacing various East German motor-paced cyclists at the Andreasried cycling track in Erfurt.
