= Anthony Williamsen =

American cyclist

Personal information
- Born: January 31, 1880 Milwaukee, Wisconsin, United States
- Died: October 1, 1956 (aged 76)

Cycling career
- Sport: Cycling

Anthony Williamsen (January 31, 1880 – October 1, 1956) was an American cyclist. He competed in four events at the 1904 Summer Olympics.
