= Oscar Goerke =

American cyclist

Personal information
- Born: January 10, 1883 Brooklyn, New York, U.S.
- Died: December 12, 1934 (aged 51) Maplewood, New Jersey, U.S.

Cycling career
- Sport: Cycling

Professional team
- 1904: USA Olympic Cycling Team
Medal record
Representing the United States
Men's track cycling
Olympic Games
Silver medal – second place	1904 St. Louis	2 mile

Oscar Goerke, Jr. (January 10, 1883 – December 12, 1934) was an American cyclist who competed in the early twentieth century. He was born in Brooklyn and died in Maplewood, New Jersey. Goerke competed in all seven events in cycling at the 1904 Summer Olympics in Missouri and won the silver in the 2 mile race.
