= Teddy Billington =

American cyclist

Personal information
- Born: July 14, 1882 Southampton, England
- Died: August 8, 1966 (aged 84) Pine Brook, New Jersey, U.S.

Cycling career
- Sport: Cycling
- Discipline: Racing
Medal record
Representing the United States
Men's track cycling
Olympic Games
Silver medal – second place	1904 St. Louis	½ mile
Bronze medal – third place	1904 St. Louis	¼ mile
Bronze medal – third place	1904 St. Louis	⅓ mile
Bronze medal – third place	1904 St. Louis	mile

Edwin Billington (July 14, 1882, Southampton – August 8, 1966, Pine Brook, New Jersey) was an American racing cyclist who competed in the early twentieth century. An all round cycling talent he competed in Cycling at the 1904 Summer Olympics and won a silver medal in the ½ mile and three bronze medals in the ¼ mile, ⅓ and the mile race. His fiercest competitors were fellow Americans Marcus Hurley and Burton Downing who mostly won gold and silver respectively.
