= Rubicon (disambiguation) =

Rubicon is a river in northern Italy.

Rubicon may also refer to:

== Geography ==
- Rubicon River (disambiguation)

=== Australia ===
- Rubicon Estuary, Tasmania
- Rubicon, Victoria

=== Belgium ===
- Rubicon (Belgium), an underground river of Belgium

=== United States ===
- Rubicon (canal), Cape Coral, Florida
- Rubicon (community), Wisconsin, an unincorporated community
- Rubicon, California
- Rubicon, Wisconsin, a town
- Rubicon Keys, two small islands north of the upper Florida Keys
- Rubicon Peak, mountain in the Sierra Nevada mountain range
- Rubicon Point Light, small lighthouse on Lake Tahoe in California
- Rubicon Springs, California
- Rubicon Township, Illinois
- Rubicon Township, Michigan
- Rubicon Trail, an offroad route in Sierra Nevada, California

== Art, media, and entertainment ==
=== Literature ===
- Rubicon (novel), a 1999 historical novel by Steven Saylor
- Rubicon, a 1965 novel by Agnar Mykle
- Rubicon: The Last Years of the Roman Republic, a 2003 book by Tom Holland
- Rubicon virus, a plot element in the Ilium/Olympos science fiction series by Dan Simmons
- Halo: The Rubicon Protocol, a 2022 science fiction novel by Kelly Gay set in the Halo universe

=== Music ===
==== Bands ====
- Rubicon (English band), an English rock band and offshoot of Fields of the Nephilim that released two albums (1992 and 1995)
- Rubicon (New Zealand band), a New Zealand punk pop band best known for the singles "Funny Boy" and "Bruce" (2001 and 2002)
- Rubicon (American band), a funk rock band from California best known for the song "I'm Gonna Take Care of Everything"

==== Albums ====
- Rubicon (Rubicon album), 1978
- Rubicon (The Duggans album), 2005
- Rubicon (Tristania album), 2010
- Rubicon, a 2006 album by Flemish black metal band Ancient Rites
- Icon II: Rubicon, a 2006 album by Asia's John Wetton and Geoffrey Downes following up on their 2005 album Icon

==== Songs ====
- "Rubicon", a song by progressive rock artist, Peter Hammill on the 1974 album The Silent Corner and the Empty Stage
- "Rubicon", a song by rock band Journey, from the 1983 album Frontiers
- "Rubicon", a song by post-punk band Killing Joke, on the 1986 album Brighter Than a Thousand Suns
- "Rubicon", a song by futurepop band, VNV Nation on the 1999 album Empires
- "Rubicon", a song by industrial rock band, KMFDM on the 1999 album Adios
- "Rubicon", a 2004 single by French electronic music artist Alan Braxe released on the 2005 compilation album The Upper Cuts
- "Rubicon", a 2007 EP by Irish rock quartet The Kybosh
- "Rubicon", a song by indie band, Milburn on the 2007 album These Are the Facts
- "Rubicon", a song by progressive rock band Threshold on the 2012 album March of Progress
- "Rubicon", a song by Audiomachine on the 2015 album Magnus
- "Rubicon", a song by alternative metal band Deftones on the 2016 album Gore
- "Rubicon", a song by Danny Michel on his 2016 album Matadora
- "Rubicon", a song by Peso Pluma on his 2023 album Génesis

=== Television ===
- Rubicon (TV series), a 2010 American conspiratorial spy drama
- Rubicon TV, a television production company in Norway
- Rubicun III, a planet in the Star Trek: The Next Generation episode "Justice"
- USS Rubicon, a runabout featured in the Star Trek: Deep Space Nine episode "One Little Ship"
- Ballmastrz: Rubicon, a television special based on Ballmastrz: 9009

=== Video games ===
- Armored Core VI: Fires of Rubicon, the sixteenth installment of the Armored Core video game series
- EVE Online: Rubicon, an add-on of the sci-fi MMO EVE Online
- Rubicon, a 1991 computer game for the Commodore 64, Amiga, and Atari ST
- Rubicon X, a modification of Marathon: Infinity
- Rubikon, a physics engine used in Source 2

== Companies and organizations ==
- Rubicon Group, a South African renewable energy company
- Rubicon Drinks, a British soft drink manufacturer
- Rubicon Estate Winery, a winery in California
- Rubicon Foundation, a non-profit company in Durham, North Carolina
- Rubicon Group Holding, a Jordanian digital media company
- Rubicon International Services, a British private military company
- Rubicon Project, an online advertising technology firm based in Los Angeles, California
- Rubicon Race Team, an auto racing team
- Rubicon Technology, a sapphire crystal manufacturer
- Team Rubicon, a US-based humanitarian organization dedicated to disaster response
- Rubicon (UAV unit), a Russian military unit

== Land vehicles ==
- Jeep Wrangler Rubicon, a trim level of the Jeep Wrangler off-road vehicle
- Jeep Gladiator (JT), a trim level of the Jeep Gladiator pickup truck.

== Other uses ==
- Rubicon (protein), a protein regulator in humans and other organisms
- Rubicon (titular see), Roman Catholic church entity
- Operation Rubicon (police investigation), a Scottish police investigation into allegations of phone hacking, breach of data protection and perjury
- Operation Rubicon, the secret ownership of the Crypto AG by U.S. and German intelligence agencies
- Operation Rubicon, the code name for the 1851 French coup d'état
- Rouvikonas, an anarchist collective based in Athens, Greece

== See also ==
- Crossing the Rubicon (disambiguation)
- Rubycon (disambiguation)
