= Rubicon Township =

Rubicon Township may refer to several places in the United States:

- Rubicon Township, Greene County, Illinois
- Rubicon Township, Huron County, Michigan

See also

- Rubicon (disambiguation)
