= Crossing the Rubicon (disambiguation) =

Julius Caesar's Crossing the Rubicon river was an event in 49 BC that precipitated the Roman Civil War.

Crossing the Rubicon may also refer to:

- Metaphorically, a point of no return

== Music ==
Albums

- Crossing the Rubicon (Armageddon album), 1997
  - Crossing the Rubicon (Revisited), a re-recorded version, 2016
- Crossing the Rubicon (The Sounds album), 2009

Songs

- "Crossing the Rubicon", by The Human Abstract from Nocturne, 2006
- "Crossing the Rubicon", by Mattias Eklundh from Freak Guitar: The Smorgasbord, 2013
- "Crossing the Rubicon", by Revolution Renaissance from Trinity, 2010
- "Crossing the Rubicon", by Enter Shikari from Nothing Is True & Everything Is Possible, 2020
- "Crossing the Rubicon" (song), by Bob Dylan from Rough and Rowdy Ways, 2020
- "Crossing the Rubicon", by Sabaton from Legends, 2025

== Other uses ==
- "Crossing the Rubicon" (Beast Wars), a television episode
- "Crossing the Rubicon", a chapter of the manga Bleach
- Crossing the Rubicon: The Decline of the American Empire at the End of the Age of Oil, a 2004 book by Michael Ruppert

== See also ==
- Rubicon speech, a 1985 policy speech on apartheid by South African President P. W. Botha
- Rubicon (disambiguation)
- River Rubicon (disambiguation)
