= Rubicon Trail =

4x4 trail near Sacramento, California

The Rubicon Trail is a 22-mile-long route, part road and part 4x4 trail, located in the Sierra Nevada of the western United States, due west of Lake Tahoe and about 80 miles (130 km) east of Sacramento.

It is among the most well-known four-wheel drive trails in the United States. Much of its popularity is derived from its long history as a testing ground for the development of new consumer 4x4 vehicles. In recent years, interest in the trail has increased due to media exposure on television programs and social media. Beginning in the 2003 model year, the popular Jeep Wrangler has had its enthusiast-level trim named after the trail.

The western maintained section of the route is called the Wentworth Springs Road; it begins in Georgetown, California, a hamlet in California's Gold Country. The road continues from its intersection with State Route 193 toward Wentworth Springs, where the trailhead for the unmaintained portion of the route exists adjacent to Loon Lake. The trail portion of the route is about 12 miles (19 km) long and passes in part through the Eldorado National Forest as well as the Tahoe National Forest and the Lake Tahoe Basin Management Unit. The eastern maintained portion of the trail is called the McKinney Rubicon Springs Road, and leads to Lake Tahoe.

== Trail summary ==
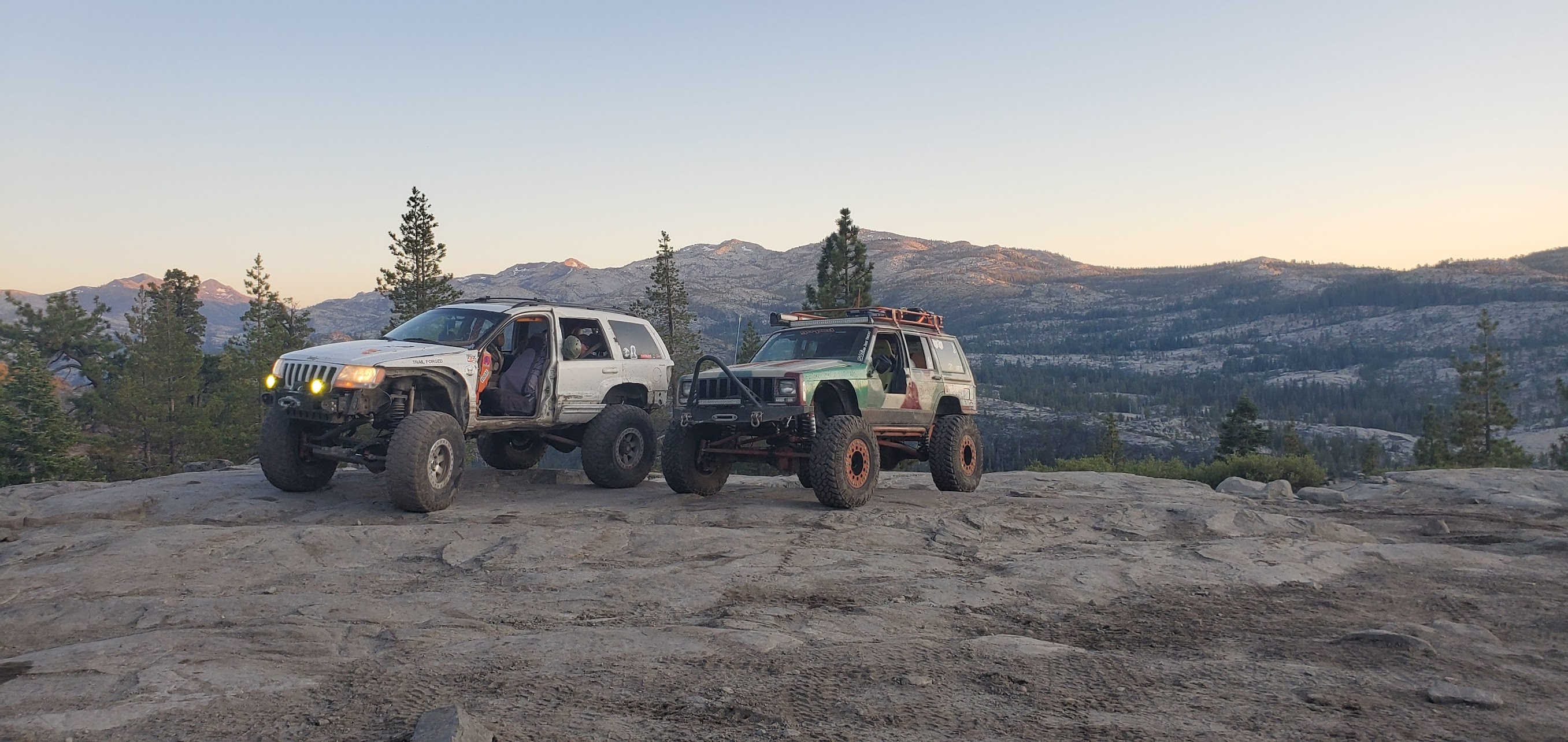
One Ton XJ and WJ on the Rubicon Trail

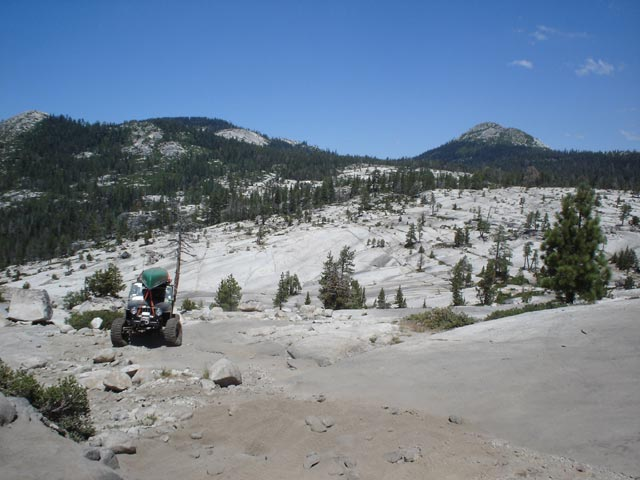
Looking across the Granite Bowl

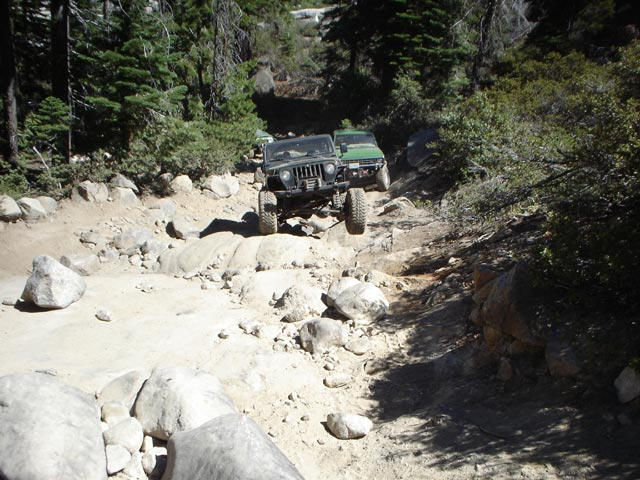
A Jeep climbing up the first part of Walker Hill

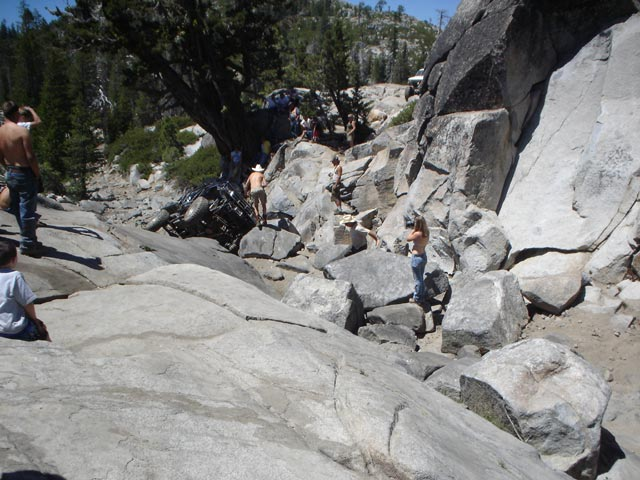
The Little Sluice Obstacle

There are three entrances to the trail: at Wentworth Springs, at the Loon Lake spillway, or on the Lake Tahoe side along Highway 89 near Tahoma. The Wentworth Springs entrance, at Gerle Creek, is the original entrance to the trail and starts with an obstacle known as Devil's Postpile (not to be confused with Devils Postpile National Monument near Mammoth Lakes). The Loon Lake route is shorter, first crossing the Granite Bowl, a large open rock valley. The Loon Lake entrance previously had an obstacle known as The Gatekeeper. It was altered using explosives in October 2004 in a failed attempt to make the trail easier to reduce wheel spin and sediment movement to local waters. This attempt was a cooperative effort between El Dorado County and the Eldorado National Forest. The obstacle exists today and is still difficult by typical trail standards.

The Wentworth Springs entrance joins the trail from Loon Lake shortly before Ellis Creek. After driving through the relatively mild section beyond Ellis Creek, the Walker Hill obstacle is encountered. It includes a rocky climb followed by a notch that can either be straddled or side-hilled. Walker Hill is named for Chuck Walker, a long-time trail guide for Jeepers Jamboree known for his good attitude and winning smile.

A short distance beyond Walker Hill is the Soup Bowl. The Soup Bowl is an optional obstacle next to the trail, a short climb with a series of ledges that are difficult to ascend. High clearance and long wheelbases help with this obstacle. After passing the Soup Bowl, the Little Sluice awaits.

The Little Sluice, also known as the Sluice Box or simply as "The Box", is close to Spider Lake. It can be bypassed in two ways for vehicles that cannot ascend the main trail. The most common bypass route is to the left of the obstacle known as the long bypass. The second way to bypass the Little Sluice is to drive up Toyota Rock. Toyota Rock is to the right toward Spider Lake (so named because it resembles a spider from above), just before the large rocks in the Little Sluice, and leads to the slabs that surround Little Sluice. The large rocks in the Little Sluice were reduced in size in the fall of 2012 by El Dorado County to reduce concentrated camping and the "spectator" atmosphere at the Sluice. The section is still difficult, but the difficulty has been reduced.

After passing the Little Sluice, the next obstacle is Thousand Dollar Hill (also sometimes called Million Dollar Hill). It is a rock ledge followed by a steep grade, facing downhill if driving the trail toward Lake Tahoe. As of 7/15/2012, Thousand Dollar Hill has been closed. This obstacle had a moderately difficult bypass (the original trail), which is now the only route open.

The next obstacle is Arnold's Rock, named for Kenny and Mike Arnold, brothers who guided this section at early Jamborees.

The trail splits again about a quarter mile past this point, the lower trail continuing on the granite slabs (a.k.a. Indian Trail) or the upper (original) trail through the Old Sluice. Both routes lead to Buck Island Lake. The granite slabs are off-camber but are an easier and much quicker route to take.

The trail then continues toward the Big Sluice. This downhill section contains a switchback with a rock drop-off and an off-camber rocky section, leading to the Rubicon River Bridge and then into the private property of the Rubicon Springs.

Rubicon Springs is on private property and must be respected as such. A cabin (in the same spot as the former 2-story hotel) houses the caretaker family. Many campsites are available in this area, as well as a helipad for emergencies and for large events to fly supplies in. Most large events set up base camp in this area because it is large enough for hundreds of people to camp. Notable annual events are the Jeepers Jamboree (maximum of 500 vehicles), the Jeep Jamboree (200 vehicles), the Toyota Land Cruiser Association's Rubithon (approximately 150-200 vehicles), and the Marlin Crawler Round-Up (approximately 150-200 vehicles).

After Rubicon Springs is Cadillac Hill. Cadillac Hill is a series of switchbacks up to Observation Point, starting with a rutted-out section with many exposed tree roots. After turning a hairpin, the trail becomes very off-camber and contains a series of boulders to maneuver around or over. After that is a steep stair-step obstacle to climb. Observation Point is located at the top of hill, before the long dirt road back to Lake Tahoe. There are a few small sections of rocks like "Potato Patch" and the "Slabs" after this, but nothing that poses a significant obstacle.

== Rubicon land use issues ==
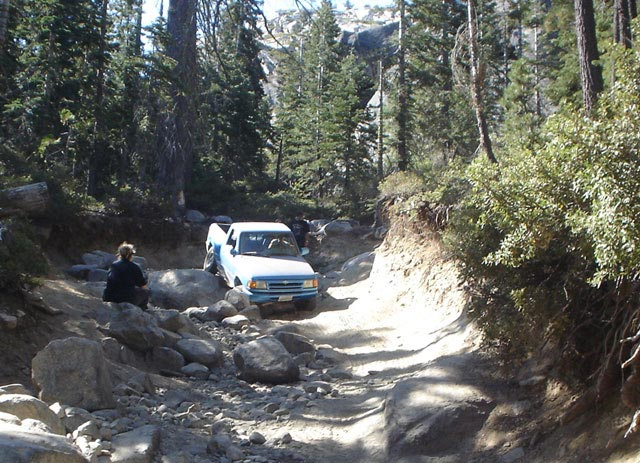
A stock Ford Ranger descending Big Sluice

In 2001, the Lahontan Water Board contemplated filing an order to force the closure of the east end of the trail near the Tahoe Basin. To prevent this closure, Friends of the Rubicon (FOTR), a grassroots, user-driven organization, was formed and built more than thirty erosion control devices on the trail to prevent erosion and siltation of the watershed. The Lahontan Water Board dropped its effort, and FOTR kept the trail open and has conducted many work projects on the trail each year since then.

The initial organized effort to close the trail involved embroiling El Dorado County in an effort to manage the trail. This effort resulted in the Rubicon Trail Master Plan, which the county rejected because it was projected to be too costly. Most of the costs involved were for monitoring, not for fixing problems on the trail.

When the Master Plan effort failed, multiple complaints were filed with the Central Valley Regional Water Quality Board. The complaints were that the trail was causing erosion and siltation of the watershed, sanitation problems were not being addressed, and Off-Highway Vehicles (OHVs) were spilling oil on the trail. These complaints resulted in a Draft Cleanup and Abatement Order that would have closed the trail had it been implemented as written. During the hearing, before issuing a final order, testimony was heard from El Dorado County, the Eldorado National Forest, and the Rubicon Trail Foundation. The result of that hearing was a more manageable order requiring El Dorado County and the Eldorado National Forest to repair the trail, build bridges, obtain an accurate user count, conduct education and planning efforts, report regularly to the board, and provide more law enforcement on the trail. The Cleanup and Abatement Order was rescinded on October 14, 2014, noting the efforts by government agencies and trail users to redress water quality concerns.

The Rubicon Trail Foundation, Friends of the Rubicon, El Dorado County, and the Eldorado National Forest continue their efforts to keep this "crown jewel" of OHV routes open.

== Usage ==
Part of the trail is used as a testing ground by Jeep and many aftermarket Jeep product companies, local to Northern California. The Rubicon variants of the Jeep Wrangler and Jeep Gladiator are named after this trail.

Many large events take place on the trail, ranging from Jeep-only events (Jeep Jamboree) and 4x4 enthusiast events (Jeepers Jamboree, TLCA's Rubithon, Marlin Crawler Round-Up, Cantina on the Con) to family trips to special events organized just for SUVs and stock 4x4s that could not otherwise complete the trail.

As of April 2016, the TV show Top Gear USA on History channel recorded images of the entire Rubicon Trail using an NCTech iSTAR 360-degree camera, as part of their show. A few hundred of the 6000 images can be found on Google Maps provided by NCTech.

== Gallery ==
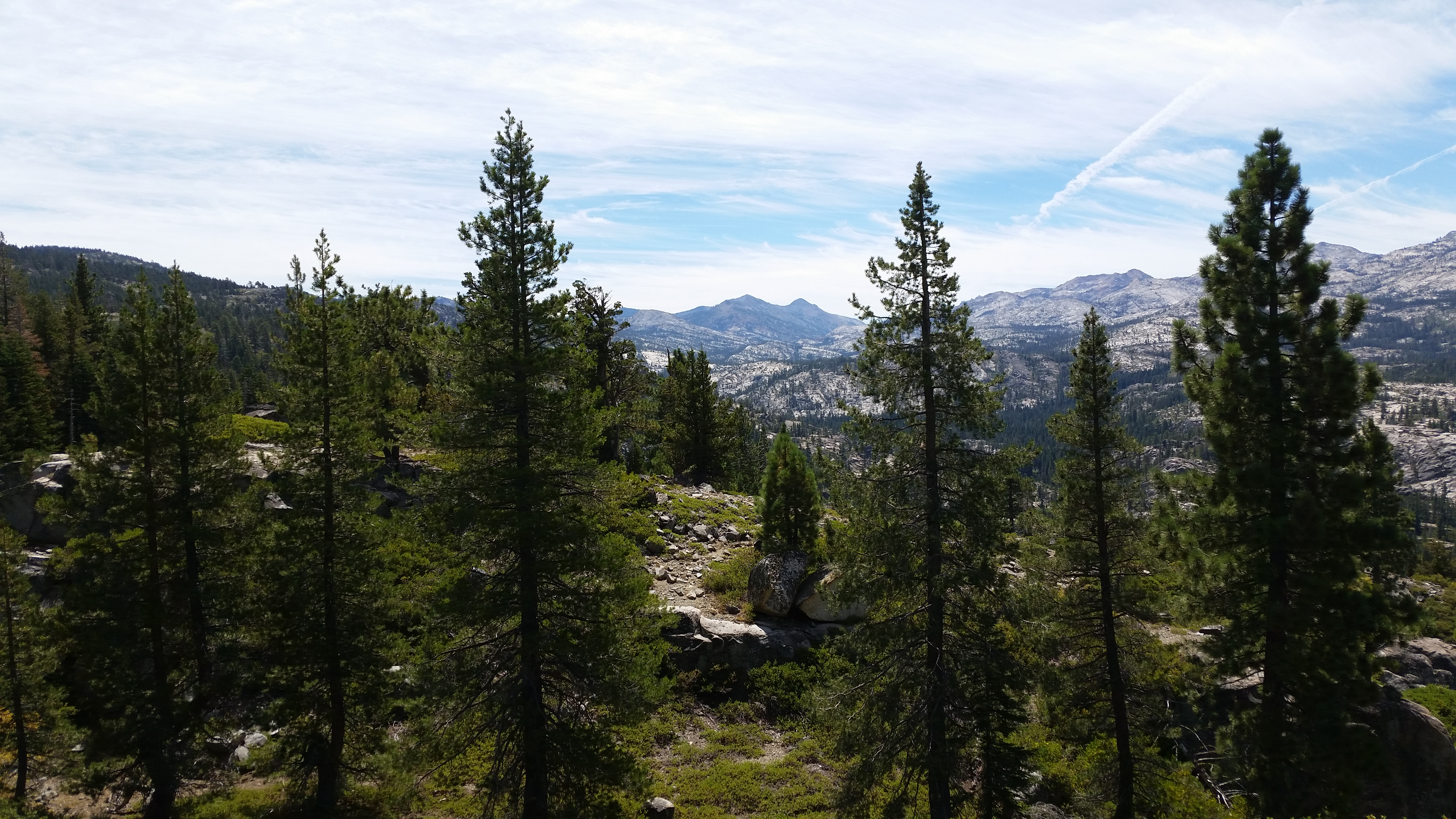
View of the surrounding forest from the top of "Cadillac Hill".

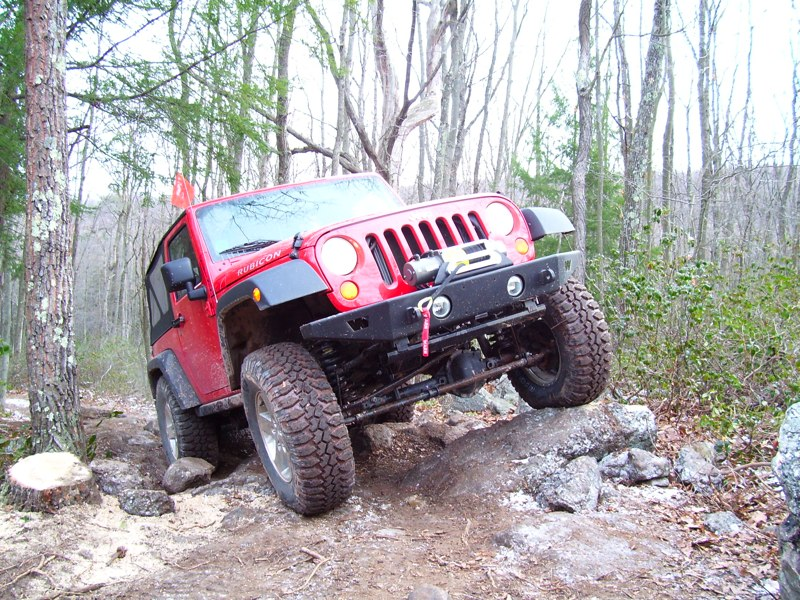
Jeep Wrangler Named after the Rubicon Trail
