= Rubico (disambiguation) =

Rubico may refer to:

- Rubicon (Rŭ́bĭcō), river in Italy, famous for Julius Caesar "crossing the Rubicon"
- Green clay, tennis court surface
- "Rubico", alias of David Kernell, who perpetrated the Sarah Palin email hack

== See also ==
- Rubicon (disambiguation)
