= Eagle Lake (Desolation Wilderness) =

Lake in the state of California, United States

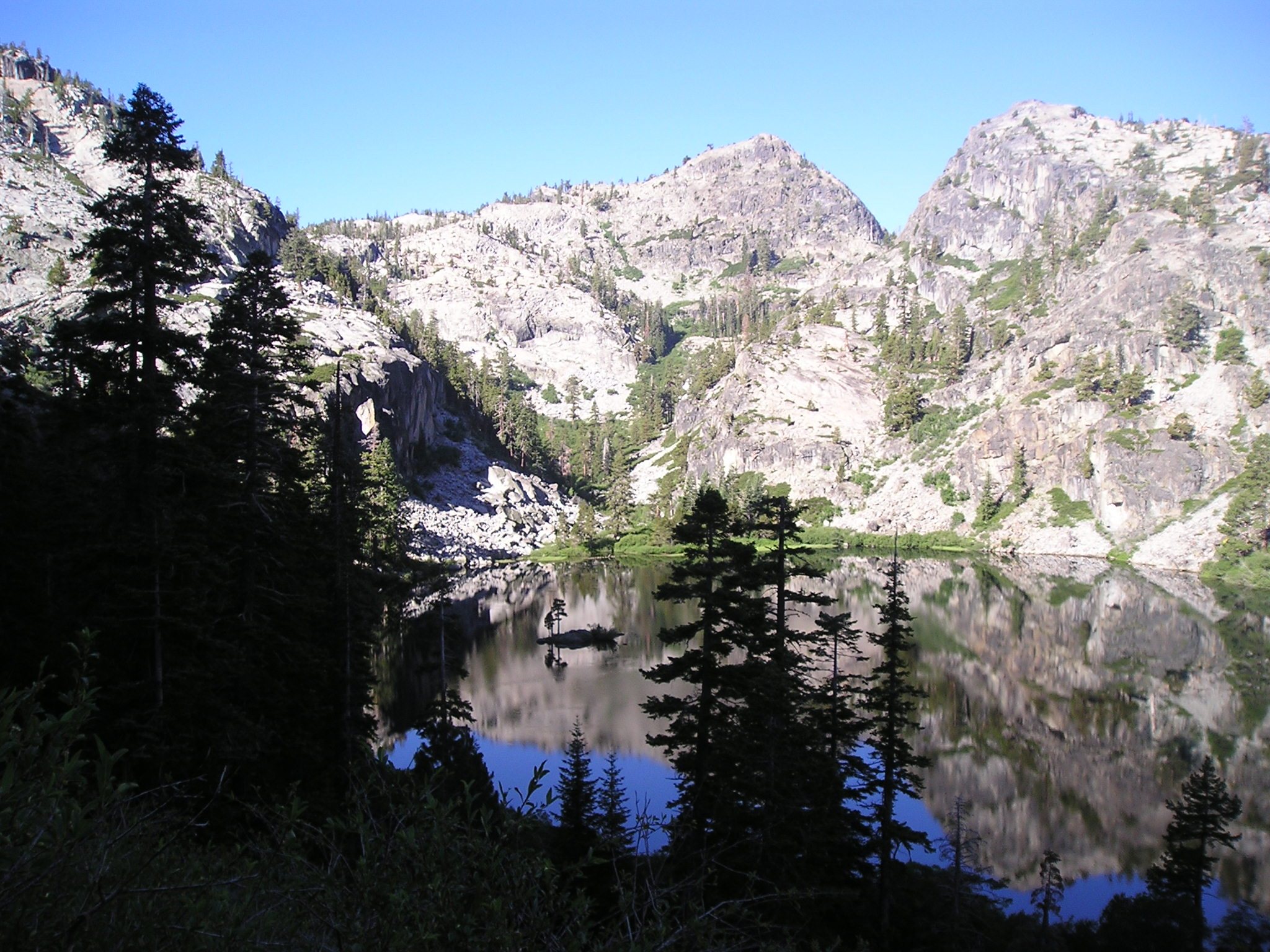

- Location within California Location within the United States
- Location: Desolation Wilderness, El Dorado County, California, US
- Coordinates: 38°56′32″N 120°07′21″W
- Type: Lake
- Basin countries: United States

Eagle Lake is a backcountry lake in the Sierra Nevada mountain range, to the west of Lake Tahoe in the Desolation Wilderness. It can be reached by hiking west out of the Eagle Lake trailhead on HWY 89 at Emerald Bay State Park.

== See also ==
- List of lakes in California
