= Raymond Spencer =

Australian businessperson

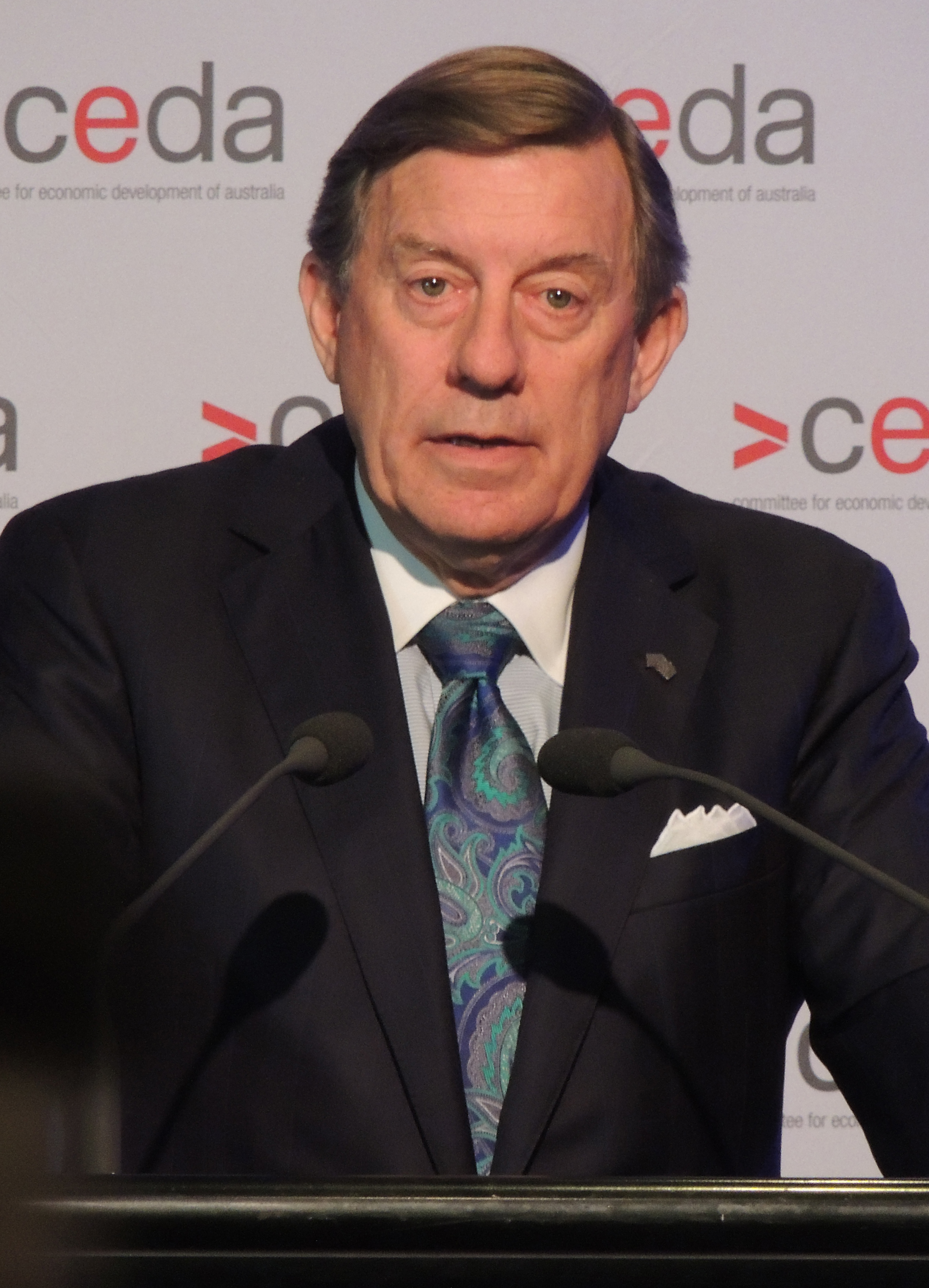
Raymond Spencer speaks at CEDA State of the State event, Adelaide, 2015

Raymond Spencer AM (born 1950) is a South Australian businessman, chairman of South Australia's Economic Development Board and chairman of the South Australian Health and Medical Research Institute (SAHMRI).

== Career ==
Spencer grew up on a farm in Clarendon in the 1950s where he witnessed the economic progress made under the leadership of Premier Thomas Playford.

After studying law at the University of Adelaide, Spencer left South Australia at the age of 18. He lived and worked in the US, India and Europe for 35 years before returning to Adelaide in 2009. He worked in the not-for-profit sector before starting an IT business in 1989. That business was acquired by Capgemini twenty years later. While abroad, Spencer was inducted into the Chicago Area Entrepreneur Hall of Fame in 2003 and was named Ernst & Young Entrepreneur of The Year for the Illinois Region in 2005. Raymond is a Laureate of the Computerworld Honors Program, which recognises the use of information technology to produce and promote positive social change.

Following his return to South Australia, he was appointed Chairman of South Australia's Economic Development Board on 1 January 2011.

In 2013 he received an Honorary Degree of Doctor of Humane Letters from the University of Arizona.

Spencer has consistently expressed pride in his South Australian heritage and has described what he calls the "South Australian DNA" as containing "innovation, creativity and industriousness." He has encouraged South Australian businesses to think globally and aggressively add value to existing products and services. He urged for investment in ports in 2013, and was buoyant about agricultural, mining and manufacturing sectors. He has encouraged the state to take on debt to build critical infrastructure and said that if he were able to, he would take state debt to 20% of Gross State Product and invest in infrastructure immediately. He also advocated for planning system reform in order "to force economic growth and improve our quality of living" and said "we need to sell South Australia."

Spencer believes that "value adding" to support growth in the resources sector presents economic opportunities for South Australia. He said in 2013: "Building businesses in the value chain that is going to support the resources industry. That's where the really big bang from the resources industry really comes." In 2013, Spencer also stated that he believed there was no future for the automotive industry in South Australia without subsidy, and that subsidies should be extended for a period of years while the state builds its advanced manufacturing capacity. He suggested that South Australia should "work like hell to create more and more advanced manufacturing, expand the defense industry [and] get the services businesses to the resources industry in place that will attract a lot of those skills."

In 2014, Spencer was an investor in, board chairman or director of: a winery, a mining company, an energy company and a number of technology start-ups. As of 2015, Spencer remains an investor in and director of private companies, is a member of the investment committee of three US-based venture capital funds and is a director of Rubicon Technology. Spencer is also Chairman of Capgemini's Financial Services Global Business Unit and Signostics Limited and has acted as an advisor to corporations and not-for-profit groups.

Spencer is optimistic about economic opportunities of South Australia's Mining industry, renewable energy resources, its agricultural products and emerging knowledge economy. He also believes that South Australia should consider major tax reform to make the region more attractive to investment and that the State's public sector needs to become more "customer" and "outcome" focused. He has advocated for tax reform since his appointment to the Economic Development Board and has been involved in an investigation undertaken by ICAC following the Gillman land sale controversy.

Spencer was appointed a Member of the Order of Australia in the 2024 Australia Day Honours for his "significant service to business, and to the community through a range of organisations".

== Gillman land sale ==
In 2013, Spencer received a proposal from former Santos chairman Stephen Gerlach of Adelaide Capital Partners for the purchase and use of a 407-hectare (1,010-acre) site of public land at Gillman in South Australia. The land was sold for $122 million without being put to tender, and has since become the subject of an investigation by South Australia's Independent Commissioner Against Corruption (ICAC). Premier Jay Weatherill alleged that Spencer brought him the proposal and asked for it to be "entertained". Spencer later attended a meeting between ACP and the Premier, and was subsequently contacted by ACP to discuss the possibility of fast-tracking the process.

== Personal life ==
Spencer was born in Clarendon, South Australia. His family first settled there in 1839. He is married to Tina and has four children.
