= Lora Josephine Knight =

American philanthropist (1864–1945)

Lora J. Knight
- Born: Laura Josephine Small; May 1, 1864; Galena, Illinois
- Died: June 26, 1945 (aged 81); Vikingsholm; Lake Tahoe, California
- Other name: Lora Small Moore
- Spouses: James Hobart Moore; Harry French Knight
- Children: Nathaniel Moore

Lora Josephine Knight (1 May 1864 – 26 June 1945) was an American philanthropist from California who was at one time one of the wealthiest women in America according to newspaper reports. She was a major promoter and financial backer of Charles Lindbergh's flight across the Atlantic in the Spirit of St. Louis; and donated to a number of other causes and funded various building projects including her own summer retreat Vikingsholm, for which she is most known.

== Biography ==
Small was born in Galena, Illinois, in 1864 to lawyer Edward Small. She married James Hobart Moore, who she met while he worked with her father in his law practice, and who along with his brother became rich by gaining controlling interests in a large number of companies such as the Diamond Match Company, U.S. Steel, Union Pacific, and Nabisco.

In 1884, the two had a son, Nathaniel Moore, who later married Helen Fargo, heiress to the Wells Fargo fortune. He won a gold medal in the 1904 Summer Olympics as part of American golf team, and was known for his lavish parties, but died at 25 in 1910 after a night in "Chicago's most famous and expensive house of prostitution," which made national news and led to a citywide crackdown on brothels and morphine abuse in Chicago.

She and James Moore bought land at Carnelian Bay in Lake Tahoe in 1914 to build a large home known as Wychwood, as well getting another retreat on Lake Geneva. They also owned homes in Illinois and Wisconsin. However, her husband's health began failing and he died on July 20, 1916, leaving her with an estate of at least $15 million. She became one of the wealthiest women in America according to newspapers at the time.

In 1922, she married stockbroker Harry French Knight of St. Louis. As president of the St. Louis Flying Club, Harry Knight knew Charles Lindbergh, and the Knights were major financial backers of Lindbergh's 1927 solo flight from New York to Paris in the Spirit of Saint Louis. Lindbergh even stayed at the Knight's house the night before his flight.

In 1924, the Knights hired Myron Hunt to build a home they named Cima del Mundo in Santa Barbara, California on the Montecito hillside.

In 1927, she divorced Harry Knight, charging him with "extreme cruelty." She risked losing her entire fortune from her first marriage as part of the divorce. Despite the divorce, Lora continued to use her ex-husband's last name.

Knight sold her Wychwood home to San Francisco businessman Robert Stanley Dollar Sr. In the summer of summer of 1929, Knight built Vikingsholm, the house she is most known for, buying the 240 acres of land in Emerald Bay in Lake Tahoe from William Henry Armstrong, whom she knew through her church, for $250,000. She hired Swedish architect Lennart Palme, who she was related through marriage, and chose a Scandinavian motif based on Palme's own home in New York. Knight often entertained guests such as her friend Charles Lindbergh at Vikingsholm. She also built a small teahouse on Fannette Island inside the bay.

Knight was known for her hospitality, philanthropy, and eye for real estate. Her charitable contributions included youth groups, community centers, and college scholarships. She died at Vikingsholm in 1945 at the age of 81. Her $3 million estate went mostly to relatives and church and educational organizations. Vikingsholm eventually became part of Emerald Bay State Park.
