= Nathaniel Moore (golfer) =

American golfer (1884–1910)

Personal information
- Full name: Nathaniel Ford Moore III
- Born: January 31, 1884 Chicago, Illinois, U.S.
- Died: January 9, 1910 (aged 25) Chicago, Illinois, U.S.
- Spouse: Helen Fargo

Career
- Sport: Golf
Medal record
Men's golf
Representing United States
Olympic Games
Gold medal – first place	1904 St. Louis	Team

Nathaniel Ford Moore III (January 31, 1884 – January 9, 1910), known as Nathan or Nat, was an American golfer from Illinois who competed in the 1904 Summer Olympics.

== Career ==
He was the son of James Hobart Moore, a wealthy businessman with controlling interest in the National Biscuit Company, Continental Can, Diamond Match Company and the Chicago, Rock Island & Pacific Railroad; and his wife Lora Moore. He died in the Chez Shaw brothel in Chicago's Levee district after spending much of the previous night at the Everleigh Club. Drugs were suspected in his death, which led to a crackdown on brothels and morphine abuse in Chicago.

In 1904 he was part of the American Olympic golf team which won the gold medal. He finished 28th in this competition. In the individual competition he finished 19th in the qualification and was eliminated in the second round of the match play.

== See also ==
Golf at the 1904 Summer Olympics
