= Rubicon, California =

Former settlement in California, US

Coordinates: 39.001°N 120.1044°W

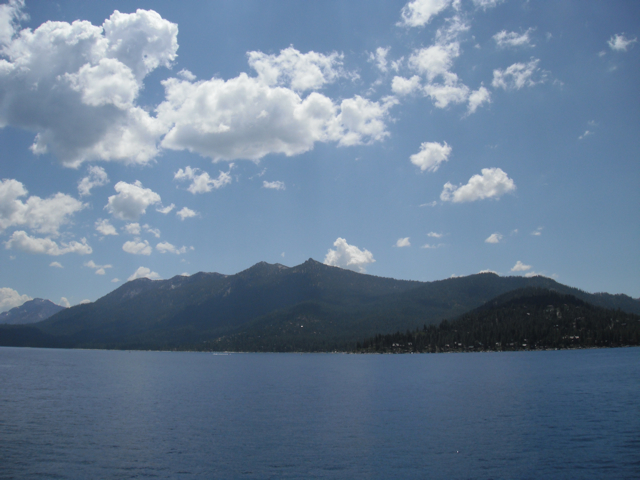
Rubicon Bay and Peak from Lake Tahoe

Rubicon (also called "Rubicon Bay") is a former settlement in El Dorado County, California, United States. It was located on Lake Tahoe, 4.5 miles (7.2 km) north of Emerald Bay.

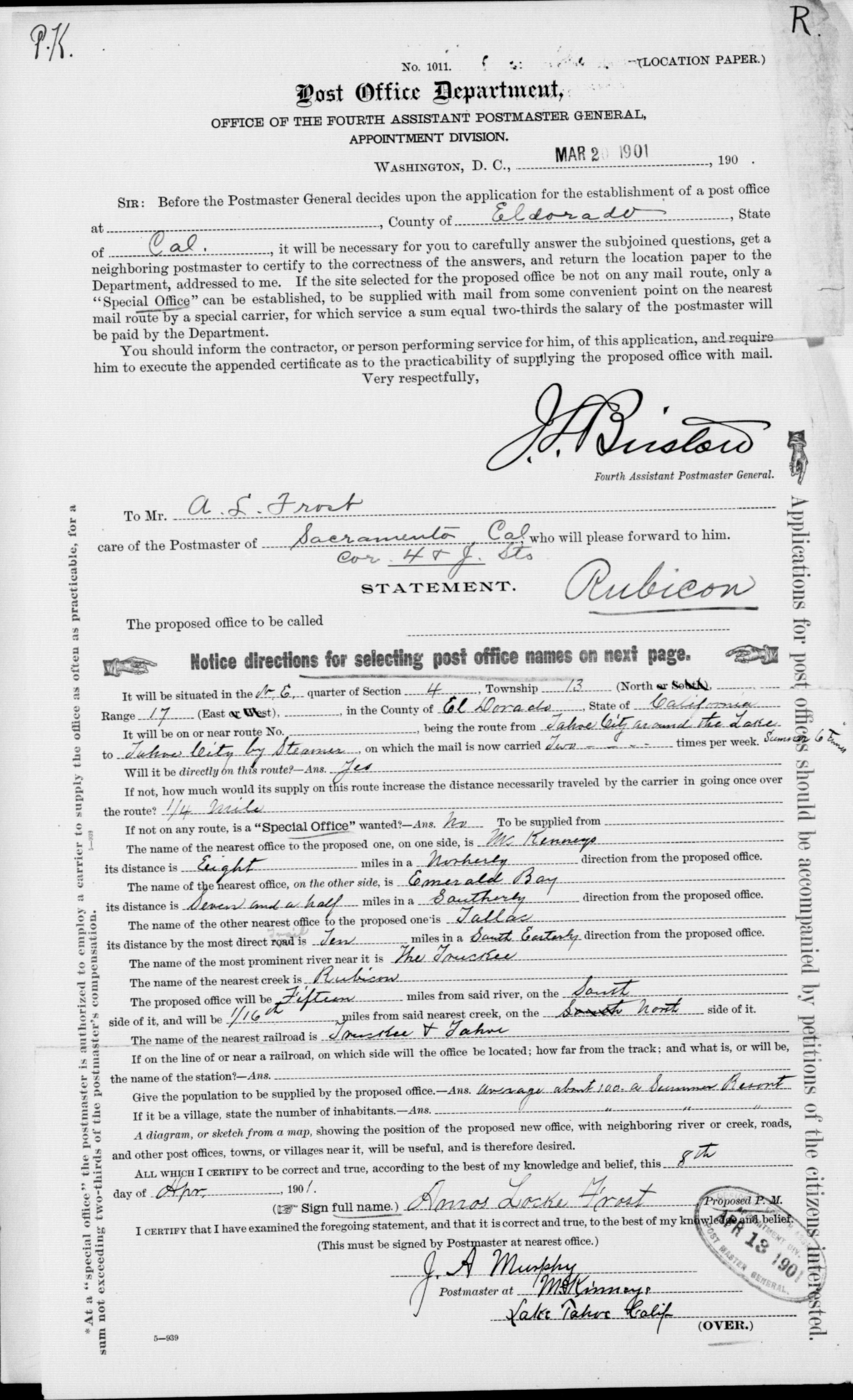
Rubicon's application for a post office.

A post office operated at Rubicon from 1901 to 1906 and from 1909 to 1913, located at the "northeast quarter of Section 4 of Township 13 North, Range 17 East" (of the Mount Diablo meridian). It sat 1/16th (330 feet) north of Rubicon Creek. In 2011, Rubicon received over 500 inches of snow. Rubicon was a separate community from Rubicon Springs, in the mountains to the west, and Rubicon Lodge to the north.

== Climate ==
Climate data for Rubicon, California, 1991–2020 normals, extremes 1990–present
| Month | Jan | Feb | Mar | Apr | May | Jun | Jul | Aug | Sep | Oct | Nov | Dec | Year |
|---|---|---|---|---|---|---|---|---|---|---|---|---|---|
| Record high °F (°C) | 57 (14) | 61 (16) | 65 (18) | 68 (20) | 80 (27) | 84 (29) | 90 (32) | 89 (32) | 87 (31) | 78 (26) | 67 (19) | 67 (19) | 90 (32) |
| Mean maximum °F (°C) | 50.7 (10.4) | 51.1 (10.6) | 57.4 (14.1) | 62.0 (16.7) | 68.7 (20.4) | 76.6 (24.8) | 81.8 (27.7) | 80.7 (27.1) | 76.4 (24.7) | 68.0 (20.0) | 54.2 (12.3) | 49.2 (9.6) | 82.7 (28.2) |
| Mean daily maximum °F (°C) | 37.9 (3.3) | 38.4 (3.6) | 42.5 (5.8) | 46.8 (8.2) | 54.0 (12.2) | 64.0 (17.8) | 73.1 (22.8) | 72.3 (22.4) | 65.5 (18.6) | 54.2 (12.3) | 43.4 (6.3) | 36.8 (2.7) | 52.4 (11.3) |
| Daily mean °F (°C) | 31.9 (−0.1) | 31.7 (−0.2) | 34.7 (1.5) | 38.2 (3.4) | 45.2 (7.3) | 54.2 (12.3) | 62.9 (17.2) | 62.2 (16.8) | 56.2 (13.4) | 46.2 (7.9) | 36.9 (2.7) | 31.2 (−0.4) | 44.3 (6.8) |
| Mean daily minimum °F (°C) | 25.9 (−3.4) | 25.1 (−3.8) | 26.9 (−2.8) | 29.5 (−1.4) | 36.6 (2.6) | 44.4 (6.9) | 52.6 (11.4) | 52.2 (11.2) | 46.9 (8.3) | 38.4 (3.6) | 30.4 (−0.9) | 25.4 (−3.7) | 36.2 (2.3) |
| Mean minimum °F (°C) | 11.5 (−11.4) | 11.9 (−11.2) | 14.3 (−9.8) | 16.6 (−8.6) | 24.6 (−4.1) | 31.1 (−0.5) | 43.7 (6.5) | 42.7 (5.9) | 34.2 (1.2) | 24.4 (−4.2) | 16.2 (−8.8) | 11.6 (−11.3) | 7.0 (−13.9) |
| Record low °F (°C) | 0 (−18) | 2 (−17) | 5 (−15) | 5 (−15) | 15 (−9) | 21 (−6) | 31 (−1) | 25 (−4) | 24 (−4) | 11 (−12) | 6 (−14) | −5 (−21) | −5 (−21) |
| Average precipitation inches (mm) | 7.13 (181) | 6.61 (168) | 6.27 (159) | 3.36 (85) | 2.17 (55) | 0.84 (21) | 0.27 (6.9) | 0.39 (9.9) | 0.73 (19) | 2.37 (60) | 3.91 (99) | 7.12 (181) | 41.17 (1,044.8) |
| Average extreme snow depth inches (cm) | 54 (140) | 67 (170) | 78 (200) | 69 (180) | 44 (110) | 13 (33) | 0 (0) | 0 (0) | 0 (0) | 5 (13) | 13 (33) | 36 (91) | 78 (200) |
| Average precipitation days (≥ 0.01 in) | 12.9 | 12.9 | 13.1 | 10.8 | 7.3 | 5.8 | 1.3 | 2.5 | 3.3 | 6.0 | 9.9 | 13.0 | 98.8 |
Source 1: National Weather Service
Source 2: XMACIS (mean snowdepth maximum (2003-2025))
