= Rubycon =

Rubycon may refer to:

- Rubycon (album), an album by Tangerine Dream
- Rubycon, an Australian rock band, which became Slow Turismo in 2015
- Rubycon (company), a Japanese electronic component manufacturer

== See also ==
- Rubicon (disambiguation)
  - Rubicon, a river known to the Romans
