= River Rubicon (disambiguation) =

The Rubicon is a small river in Northern Italy.

River Rubicon or Rubicon River may also refer to:

- Rubicon (Belgium), a tributary of the river Amblève
- Rubicon River (California), a tributary of the American River in California, United States
- Rubicon River (New Zealand), in the South Island of New Zealand
- Rubicon River (Tasmania), a river in Tasmania, Australia
- Rubicon River (Victoria), a river in Victoria, Australia
- Rubicon River (Wisconsin), a river in Wisconsin, United States

See also:

- Rubicon (disambiguation)
- Crossing the Rubicon (disambiguation)
