= Eagle Falls trailhead =

Hiking trail in California, United States

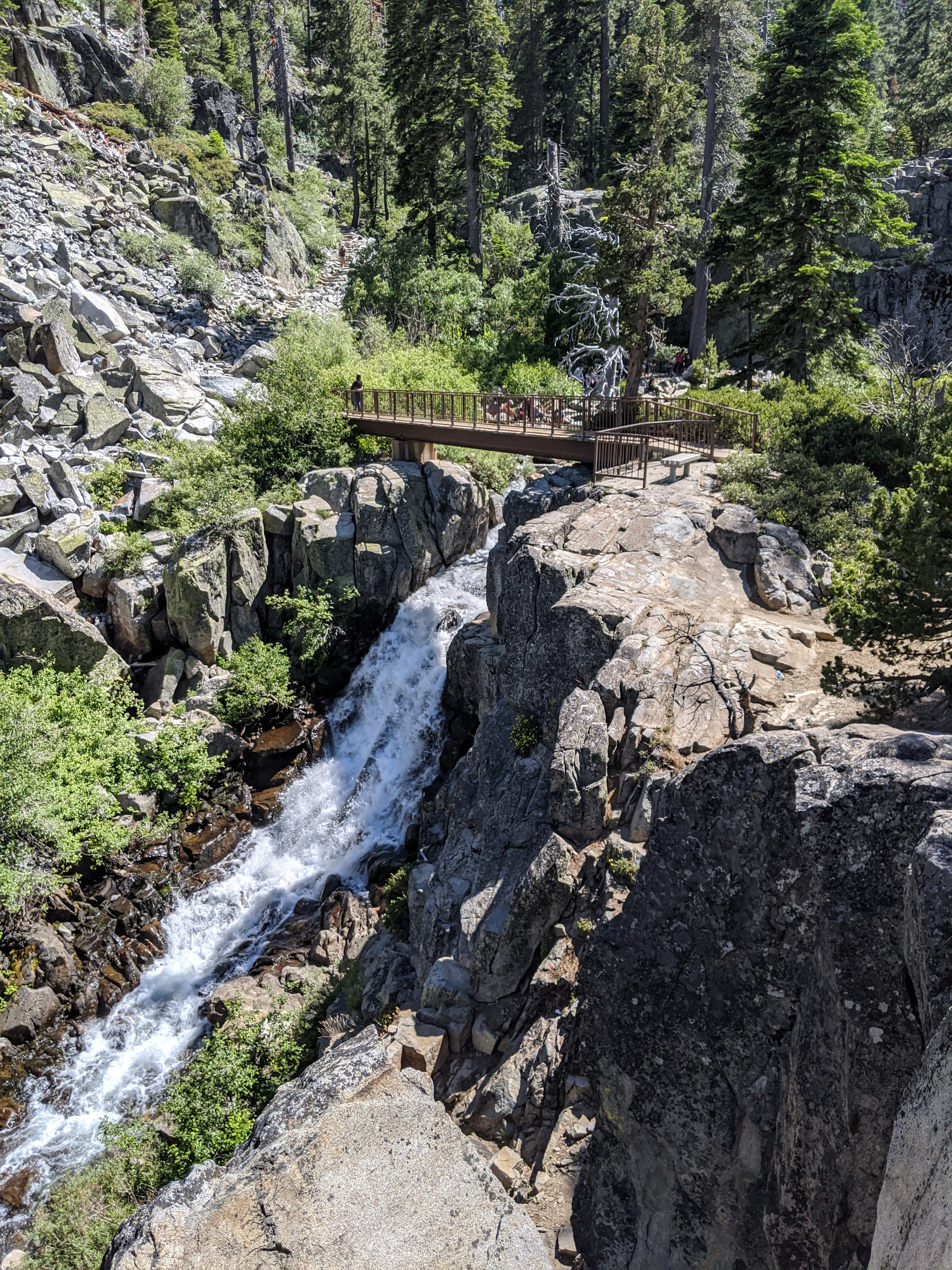
The Eagle Falls trail crosses the creek at this bridge

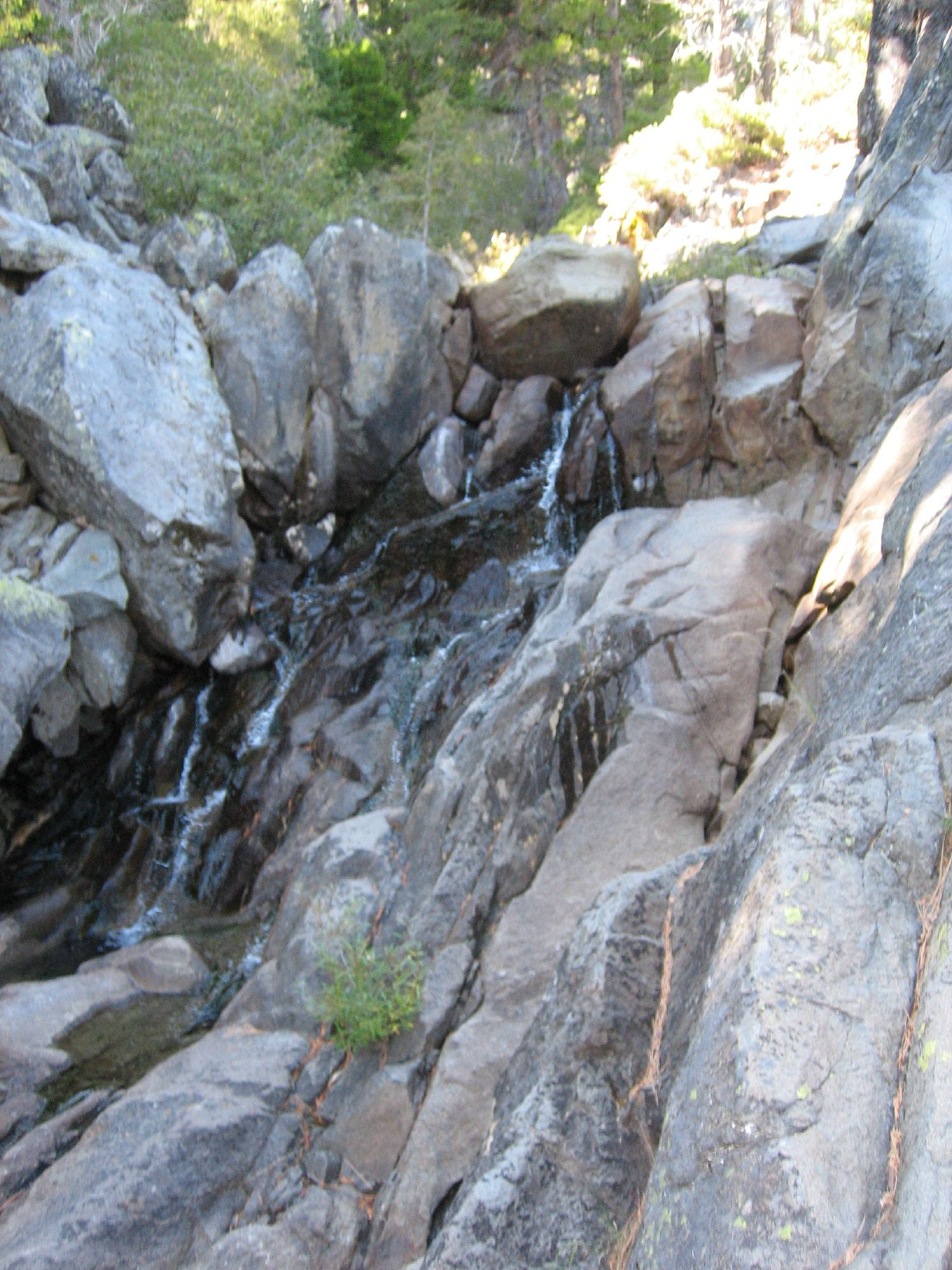
On the Eagle Falls trail

The Eagle Falls trailhead or Eagle Lake trailhead is located in the El Dorado National Forest, in the Sierra Nevada, within Emerald Bay State Park, on the western shore of Lake Tahoe, California.

It is on California State Route 89, a few miles west of the city of South Lake Tahoe, at approximately 7,100 feet in elevation.

== Destinations ==
The trailhead provides summer and winter access to the Desolation Wilderness; permits are required. Some of the destinations most accessed by the trailhead are in the wilderness, including Eagle Lake and the Velma Lakes.

== See also ==
GPS Coords: 38°57′7″N 120°6′43″W (estimated)
