= Fannette Island =

Island in Lake Tahoe, California

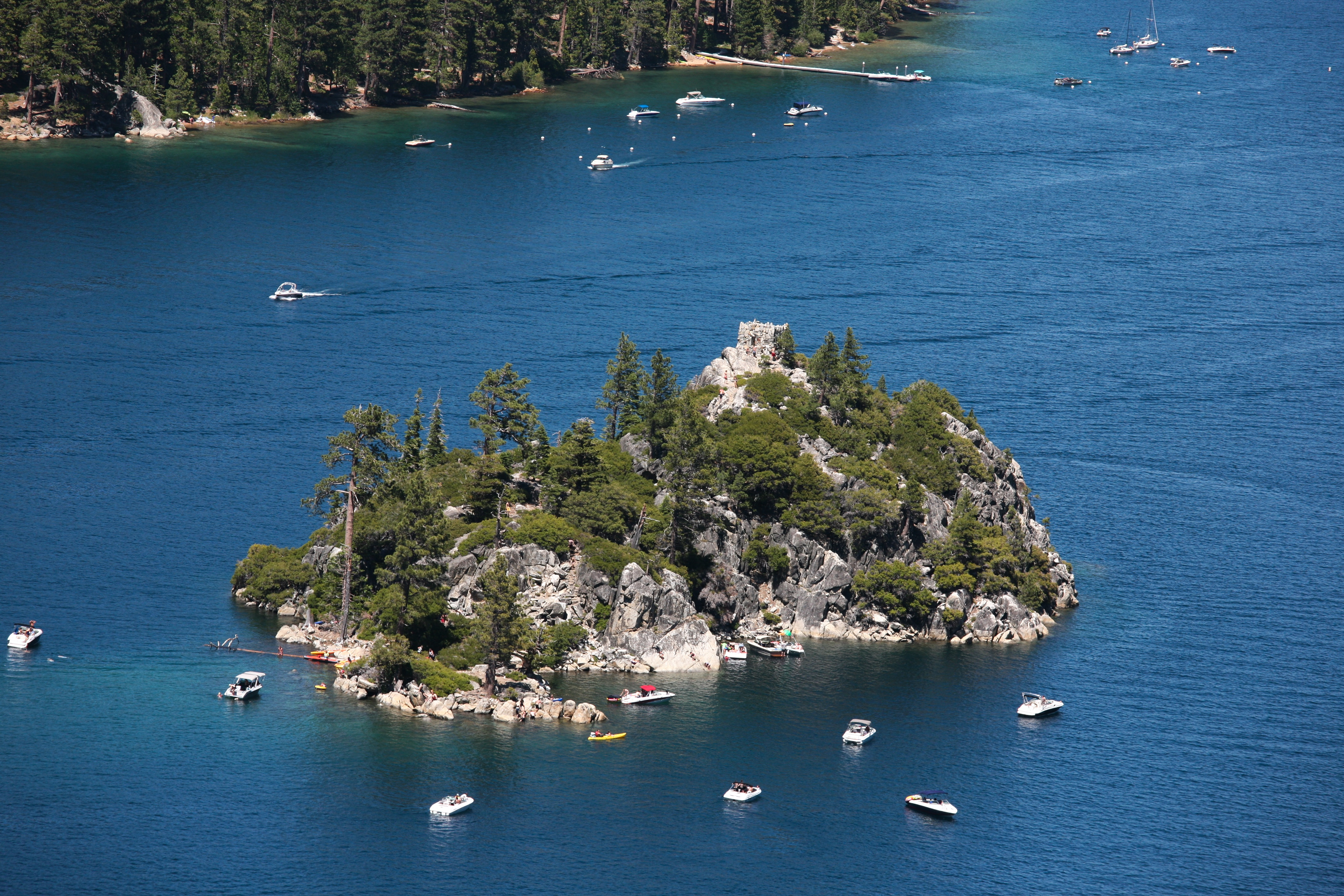
- Fannette Island

- Location within California Location within the United States

Geography
- Location: Lake Tahoe
- Coordinates: 38.9540745°N 120.1004631°W
- Area: 91,752 sq ft (8,524.0 m^{2})
- Coastline: 1,718 ft (523.6 m)

Administration
- USA
- State: California
- County: El Dorado

Demographics
- Population: 0
- Pop. density: 0/sq mi (0/km^{2})

Additional information
- Time zone: PST (UTC-8)
  - Summer (DST): PDT (UTC-7)

Fannette Island is the only island in Lake Tahoe, California, United States. It lies within Emerald Bay, on the California side of the lake. Over a long period of time, it was called many different names, including Coquette, Fanette, Baranoff, Dead Man's, Hermit's, and Emerald Isle. Fannette Island is a part of Emerald Bay State Park. It is accessible by boat, canoe, or kayak. Swimming to the island is not allowed, due to hazards including extremely cold waters and boat traffic in the area.

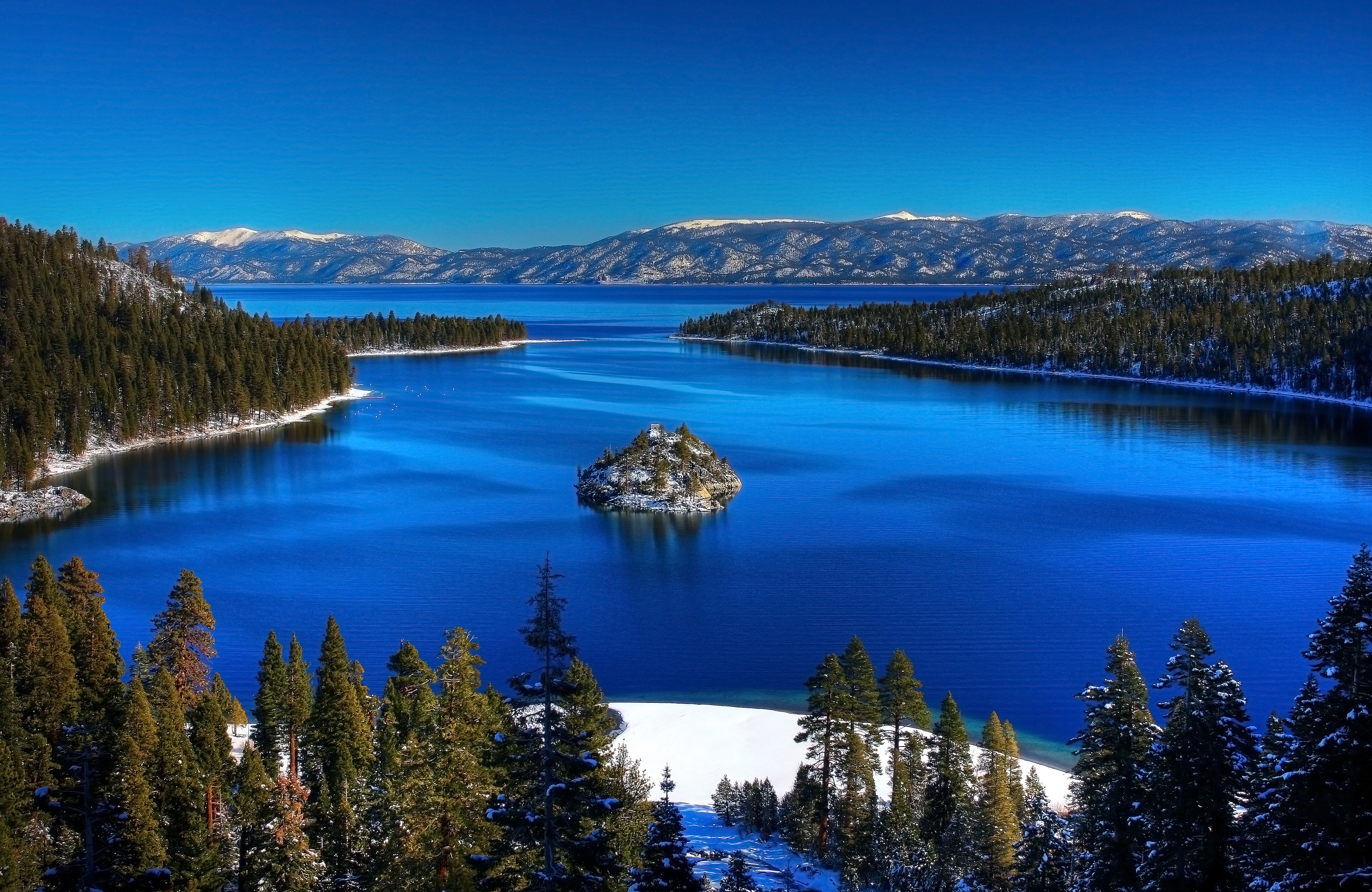
Emerald Bay with Fannette Island

The ruins of a small stone building stand on the island. The ruin is called the "Tea House," constructed by Lora Josephine Knight, the former owner of Vikingsholm.

Fannette Island was the home of Captain Dick "Them's my toes" Barter from 1863 to 1873. The eccentric captain had moved from England and built his own tomb and chapel on the island. He enjoyed sailing but almost died when caught in a sudden storm rowing back to the island. He survived by tying himself to his dinghy and riding out the storm. Unfortunately he got frostbite in two toes and earned his nickname from his penchant of showing his self-amputated toes to guests. Ironically, he was never interred in the chapel he built, as he was lost in a storm off Rubicon Point in 1873.
