= Vikingsholm =

Historic house in California, United States

Coordinates: 38.95216°N 120.10675°W

- U.S. National Register of Historic Places
- U.S. Historic district
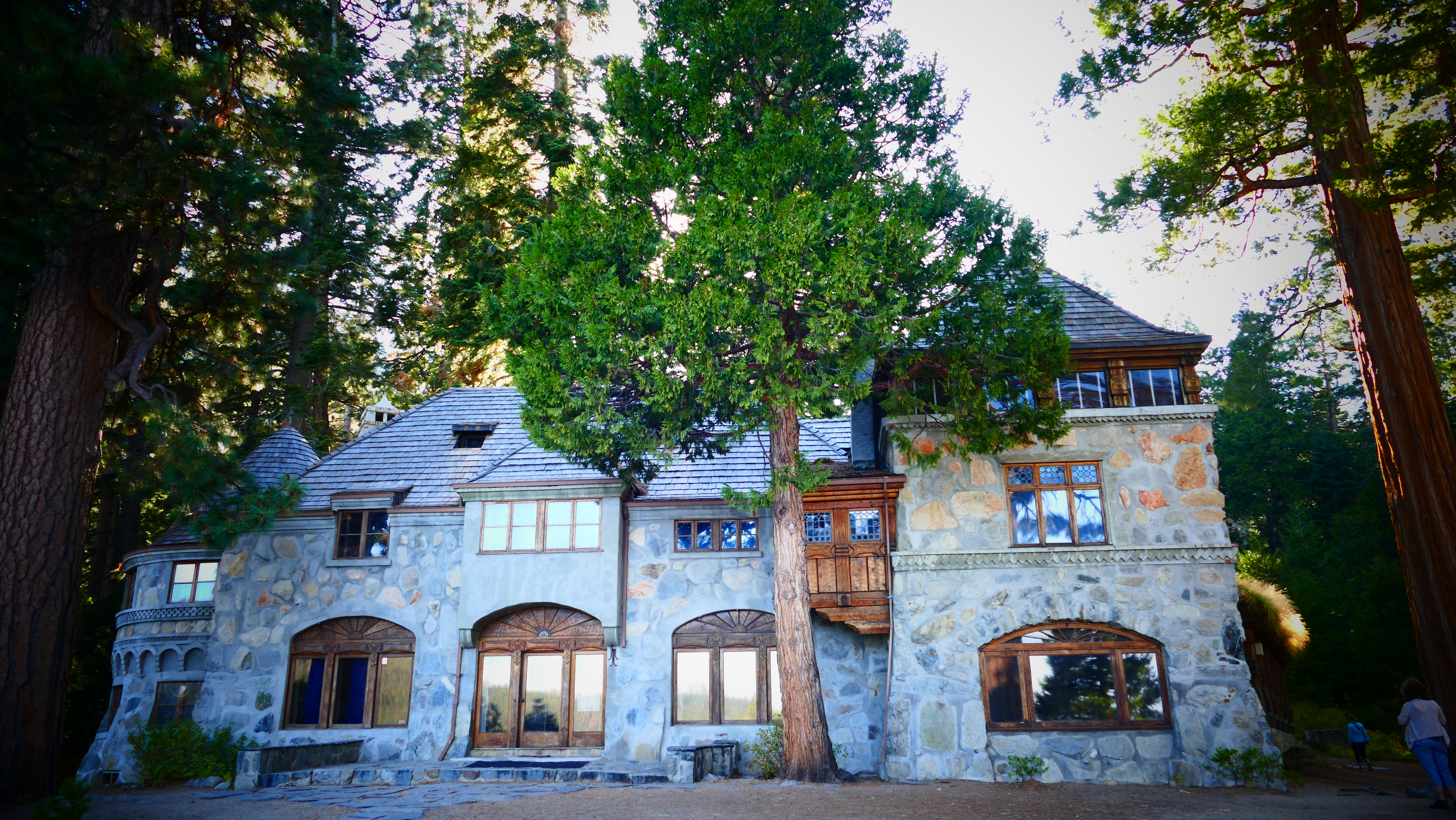
- Vikingsholm Castle, on Emerald Bay of Lake Tahoe, California.
- Nearest city: South Lake Tahoe, California
- Built: 1929
- Architect: Lennart Palme, AIA; Matt Green
- Architectural style: American Craftsman, Late 19th and early 20th Scandinavian Century Revivals
- NRHP reference No.: 96001078
- Added to NRHP: October 10, 1996

Vikingsholm is a 38-room mansion on the shore of Emerald Bay at Lake Tahoe, in El Dorado County, California, U.S., and on the National Register of Historic Places. It has been called "one of the finest examples of Scandinavian architecture in North America."

== History ==
Vikingsholm was built by Lora Josephine Knight as a summer home. The foundation was laid in 1928, and the building was constructed in 1929 by around 200 workers. Before starting construction, Knight and her architect traveled to Scandinavia to gather ideas for the house. Some parts of the structure contain no nails or spikes, as a result of old-fashioned construction methods. Most of the building was made from local materials.

While Mrs. Knight is known for building Vikingsholm, she and her businessman husband Harry were also primary backers of Charles Lindbergh's non-stop solo flight across the Atlantic Ocean in 1927.

Harvey West, a wealthy lumberman who owned the land after Knight, sold it to California for half of the appraised value in 1953.

Vikingsholm has been called "one of the finest examples of Scandinavian architecture in North America."

== Emerald Bay State Park ==
Vikingsholm, along with Knight's "Tea House" on Fannette Island, is a part of Emerald Bay State Park, which has been declared a National Natural Landmark. Tours are given of the American Craftsman Vikingsholm museum home for a nominal fee.

== Buildings ==
There are six buildings on the property that are considered to be part of Vikingsholm: the main house, the workshop, the duplex, the teahouse, the transformer building, and the gardener's cottage. In addition to the buildings, some of the rock retaining walls, the water tanks, and the entrance from the highway were also constructed during the time Mrs. Knight owned the property.

=== The Main Building ===
The main house is made up of four rectangular wings that enclose a courtyard. Pine and fir siding with ornamental handcarvings cover the wall surfaces, or they are exposed stone. The east wing is the main wing of the house, with a square three-story tower at the north end and a two-story tower at the south end. Scandinavian serpent designs are carved into the wood above the door and windows facing the lake and above the door facing the courtyard. The walls of the east wing were built to resemble those of Olavinlinna, a stone castle built in 1015 AD, and use light color mortar with dark colored stones.

==== North and South Wings ====
The north and south wings have gabled sod roofs that feature an original sprinkler system. These roofs historically featured wildflowers and grasses, but since the removal of the fir trees in the courtyard, only grow grass. The north wing was used for storage and servants quarters, and the south wing was used as a workshop and garage.

==== The West Wing ====
The west wing had an apartment for the caretaker along with laundry facilities. The original roof was made of split logs held in place without nails or spikes, but a replacement shingled roof was built after a tree fell on this section of the building. The roof features carved beams ending in dragon heads. The west entry to the apartment has a covered porch with ornamental carvings, which were based on carvings at a church entrance that the architect observed while visiting Scandinavia.

=== The Duplex ===
The duplex is a two-story, square house. The walls have decorative false logs, and the porches are mortared stone. The building was originally used as extra guest housing, and now houses the museum and visitor center managed by the park system.

=== The Teahouse ===
The teahouse is located on Fannette Island and is only accessible by boat. Natural looking stairs carved out of the rock lead up to this square, stone house. Originally, it had a flat roof, a door, and windows, but these were destroyed by vandalism and now only the main stone structure remains. There is a stone fireplace in the southwest corner of the building. This structure was originally used to host guests for tea. The original trail up to the tea house weathered away with time, and was restored in 2007.
