= Rubicon Canal =

Canal in Cape Coral, Florida, US

Coordinates: 26.5646°N 81.9635°W

The Rubicon Canal is a canal in Cape Coral, Florida. The canal is over 200 feet wide and has several basins with intersecting canals that provide access to the Gulf of Mexico via the Caloosahatchee River.
