= Wentworth Springs, California =

Coordinates: 39°00′47″N 120°20′20″W

Wentworth Springs is a set of springs that was once the site of a settlement and a camping resort in El Dorado County, California, United States. It was located 11.5 miles (19 km) west of Meeks Bay.
