= List of Bleach chapters (1–187) =

Cover of the first tankōbon volume, released in Japan by Shueisha on January 5, 2002

The first 187 chapters of the Bleach manga series, written and illustrated by Tite Kubo, comprise two story arcs: the Agent of the Shinigami arc (死神代行篇, Shinigami Daikō Hen) and the Soul Society arc (尸魂界篇, Sōru Sosaeti Hen). The plot follows the adventures of Ichigo Kurosaki, a teenager who accidentally steals the powers of the Soul Reaper Rukia Kuchiki and subsequently assumes her duties while she convalesces. Since that event, Ichigo has to fight Hollows, evil spirits that attack people. After various works, Rukia is sentenced to death by her Soul Reapers' superiors for her actions, leading Ichigo to invade the afterlife realm called Soul Society to rescue her.

Bleach was published in individual chapters by Shueisha in Weekly Shōnen Jump magazine and was later collected in tankōbon (book) format. The first arc, going through volumes 1–8, was serialized between the August 20, 2001, and February 3, 2003, issues. The second arc, covering volumes 9–21, was released from February 10, 2003, to August 1, 2005. The first seven chapters were released in a tankōbon volume on January 5, 2002, while chapters 179–187 were collected into the 21st volume published on March 3, 2006. These 21 volumes were later compiled into six omnibus collections under the name Resurrected Souls to celebrate the tenth anniversary of the series. The first collection was released on August 22, 2011, and the last was published on January 23, 2012.

An anime adaptation, produced by Studio Pierrot and TV Tokyo, premiered on TV Tokyo on October 5, 2004. These arcs were adapted into the first 63 episodes; the first twenty-episode season 1 acts as a prelude to the second and third seasons in which Ichigo enters the Soul Society. Episode 63 aired on October 1, 2006.

North American licensor Viz Media serialized the individual chapters in Shonen Jump starting from November 2007 in the United States. Viz Media released the first volume on July 6, 2004, while volume 21 was released on October 2, 2007. The company released a hardcover "collector's edition" of the first volume with a dust jacket on August 5, 2008, followed by a box set on September 2, 2008, containing the first 21 volumes, a poster, and a booklet about the series. A re-release of the series under the label of "3-in-1 Edition" started on June 7, 2011; the book containing volumes 19–21 was released on January 7, 2014.

== Volumes ==
No.	Title	Original release date	English release date
1	Strawberry and the Soul Reapers (Note: When released by Viz Media, the original title "The Death and the Strawberry" was replaced with "Strawberry and the Soul Reapers".); The Death and the Strawberry	January 5, 2002; 978-4-08-873213-8	July 6, 2004; 978-1-59116-441-8
1. "DEATH & STRAWBERRY"; 2. "STARTER"; 3. "Head-Hittin'"; 4. "WHY DO YOU EAT IT?"; 5. "BINDA BLINDA"; 6. "Microcrack."; 7. "THE PINK CHEEKED PARAKEET"
In the summer of 2001, Ichigo Kurosaki, a teenager who can see ghosts, meets Rukia Kuchiki, a Soul Reaper who is responsible for protecting spirits while dealing with soul-eating spirits called Hollows. A hollow named Fishbone D attacks Ichigo's home while wounding Rukia, forcing her to transfer her powers to a desperate Ichigo to become a Soul Reaper to defeat the Hollow. With Rukia unable to resume her duties until she recovers her spirit pressure, Ichigo is forced to act as her substitute. With his newfound abilities, Ichigo saves classmate Orihime Inoue from a hollow that was the spirit of her older brother Sora before learning another classmate, Yasutora "Chad" Sado, found a parakeet harboring the soul of a boy who is being hunted by a hollow named Shrieker.
2	Goodbye Parakeet, Good Night My Sister	March 4, 2002; 978-4-08-873237-4	August 3, 2004; 978-1-59116-442-5
8. "Chasing Chad"; 9. "Monster Vs. New Girl (Smack Down)"; 10. "Monster Vs. New Girl, Part 2 (The Substitute)"; 11. "LEECH-BOMBS AND MOM"; 12. "The Gate of the End"; 13. "BAD STANDARD"; 14. "School Daze!!!"; 15. "Jumpin' Jack, Jolted"; 16. "Wasted but Wanted"
With Rukia's help, despite not seeing his opponent, Chad holds Shrieker at bay before Ichigo eventually arrives and defeats the Shrieker. But as Shrieker was originally a murderer in life, he is dragged through the Gates of Hell instead of dissolving into the Soul Society. The spirit that inhabited the cockatiel is released to move on to the Soul Society. In order for Ichigo to transform into a Soul Reaper when Rukia is not around, she purchases some soul candy for him from the Urahara Shop where she got her Gigai body form. But the candy Ichigo uses is actually an experimental artificial soul called a modsoul that runs off while ruining Ichigo's social image and turning pevert. But when a hollow appears, Ichigo defeats the monster with the modsoul's help. The soul is then captured by Kisuke Urahara, the shopkeeper who accidentally sold the candy to Rukia. After Urahara ejects the Modsoul from Ichigo's body, calling it "defective", Rukia takes the soul candy and gives back to Ichigo.
3	memories in the rain	June 4, 2002; 978-4-08-873275-6	October 12, 2004; 978-1-59116-443-2
17. "6/17"; 18. "6/17 op. 2 Doesn't Smile Much Anymore"; 19. "6/17 op. 3 memories in the rain"; 20. "6/17 op. 4 A Face From the Past"; 21. "6/17 op. 5 A Fighting Boy" (戦う少年, "Tatakau Shōnen"); 22. "6/17 op. 6 Battle in the Graveyard"; 23. "6/17 op. 7 Sharp Will, Dull Blade" (意志は鋭し、刃は鈍し, "Ishi wa Surudoshi, Yaiba wa Nibushi"); 24. "6/17 op. 8 One-Sided Sympathy"; 25. "6/17 op. 9 A Fighting Boy 2" (戦う少年2, "Tatakau Shōnen 2") (The Cigarette Blues Mix)
Keeping the modsoul, Ichigo places him in a stuffed lion plushie while naming him Kon. Ichigo and his family later visit their mother's grave on the anniversary of her death. When Ichigo tells Rukia about his mother's death, Rukia suspects that his mother was actually killed by a Hollow. While visiting the gravesite, Ichigo's younger sisters, Yuzu and Karin Kurosaki, are attacked by a Hollow named Grand Fisher. Upon learning that Grand Fisher was the one who killed his mother, a rage-filled Ichigo overwhelms the hollow as his opponent escapes. Recovered from his injuries, Ichigo admits that he wants to stay a Soul Reaper so he can protect others.
4	Quincy Archer Hates You	September 4, 2002; 978-4-08-873310-4	December 7, 2004; 978-1-59116-444-9
26. "Paradise is Nowhere"; 27. "Spirits AREN'T Always With Us"; 28. "Symptom of Synesthesia"; 29. "Stop That, Stupid!!"; 30. "Second Contact (it was beyond the scope of our understanding)"; 31. "HEROES CAN SAVE YOU"; 32. "A Hero is Always With Me?"; 33. "ROCKIN' FUTURE 7"; 34. "Quincy Archer Hates You"
The Kurosaki family and some of Ichigo's friends watch a live filming of a TV program about spirit medium Don Kanonji, who unknowingly turns a spirit into a Hollow during the show. Ichigo is forced to clean up the mess, cheering-up the shocked Kanonji. In the following days, Ichigo and Rukia find that many Hollows they have detected have been slain. They soon learn the cause is Uryū Ishida, a classmate of Ichigo's who happens to be one of the remaining Quincies, humans who use spiritual power to destroy hollows. Uryū declares himself an enemy of all Soul Reapers and challenges Ichigo to a competition of hunting hollows.
5	Right Arm of the Giant	November 1, 2002; 978-4-08-873335-7	February 1, 2005; 978-1-59116-445-6
35. "Will You Be My Enemy?"; 36. "They Died for Vengeance" (我ら、報復の為に死に至りて, Warera, Hōfuku no Tame ni Shi ni Itarite); 37. "Crossing the Rubicon"; 38. "BENT"; 39. "Right Arm of the Giant"; 40. "Grow?"; 41. "Princess & Dragon"; 42. "Princess & Dragon Part 2: The Majestic"; 43. "Princess & Dragon Part 3: Six Flowers"
In an effort to prove that the Quincies are better than Soul Reapers, Uryū challenges Ichigo to a competition to destroy the most Hollows. Unfortunately, Uryū's lure ends up attracting hundreds of hollows into Karakura Town, endangering many of Ichigo's friends. Chad is forced to fight a hollow in order to save Karin, gaining the ability to see hollows and manifest armor over his right arm. At the same time, protecting her friends from another Hollow, Orihime develops her own power: the Shun Shun Rikka sextet of fairies that emerge from her hairpins. Chad and Orihime manage to defeat their respective opponents, losing consciousness as each is saved by Urahara.
6	The Death Trilogy Overture	December 20, 2002; 978-4-08-873366-1	April 5, 2005; 978-1-59116-728-0
44. "Awaking to the Threat"; 45. "Point of Purpose"; 46. "Karneades ~ Back-to-Back"; 47. "Back-to-Back ~ Tearing Sky"; 48. "Menos Grande" (メノスグランデ); 49. "unchained."; 50. "Quincy Archer Hates You Part 2 (Blind but Bleed Mix)"; 51. "DEATH 3"; 52. "Needless Emotions"
Urahara explains to Orihime and Chad that their contact with Ichigo allowed them to manifest their own powers. After finding Uryū, Ichigo is forced to team up with the Quincy against the incoming hollows while learning Uryū's past. But then a giant Hollow known as a Menos Grande appears that Ichigo manages to defeat. But Ichigo uses too much spiritual power in the process, causing him to lose consciousness as Uryū saves him by releasing the excess energy through his bow. As Ichigo attempts to befriend Uryū the following day, Rukia attempts to return to the Soul Society. However, Rukia is confronted by two Soul Reapers sent to arrest her for giving her powers to a human: Renji Abarai and his Captain Byakuya Kuchiki, Rukia's older brother. But Uryū interferes at the last second.
7	The Broken Coda	March 4, 2003; 978-4-08-873392-0	May 31, 2005; 978-1-59116-807-2
53. "Nice to meet you. (I will beat you.)"; 54. "The Nameless Boy" (名も訊けぬ子供, "Na mo Kikenu Kodomo"); 55. "SHUT"; 56. "broken coda"; 57. "July Rain, Interrupted"; 58. "blank"; 59. "Lesson 1: One Strike! + Jailed at Home"; 60. "Lesson 1-2: DOWN!!"; 61. "Lesson 2: Shattered Shaft"
Ichigo discovers that Rukia left, and looks for her with Urahara's help, find Uryū as he is defeated by Renji. When Ichigo attempts to fight Renji, he learns that each zanpakutō sword has a unique form that can be accessed only when the Soul Reaper discovers its name. Renji uses his transformed zanpakutō Zabimaru to overwhelm Ichigo. But Ichigo makes a comeback against Renji, overwhelming him and almost defeating him. But Byakuya steps in and defeats Ichigo at an overwhelming pace. Rukia returns to the Soul Society to await execution for her action so that the now powerless Ichigo can be spared. Urahara heals Ichigo's wounds at his shop, and begins training him so he will recover his spirit energy and possibly survive against the Soul Reapers within the Soul Society.
8	The Blade and Me	June 4, 2003; 978-4-08-873435-4	August 2, 2005; 978-1-59116-872-0
62. "Lesson 2-2: Bad Ending in the Shaft"; 63. "Lesson 2-3: Inner Circle Breakdown"; 64. "BACK IN BLACK"; 65. "Collisions"; 66. "THE BLADE AND ME"; 67. "End of Lessons"; 68. "The Last Summer Vacation" (最後の夏休み, "Saigo no Natsuyasumi"); 69. "25:00 gathering"; 70. "Where Hollows Fear To Tread"
Beginning his training during summer vacation, Ichigo begins his training at the Urahara Shop by sparring against Ururu Tsumugiya to regain control of his spirit body. At the same time, a cat named Yoruichi Shihōin trains Chad and Orihime in master their powers so they can help Ichigo rescue Rukia. In the second phase of his training, Ichigo finds the chain linking his soul to his body severed by Urahara's assistant Tessai Tsukabishi before the youth placed in a pit where he either regains his Soul Reaper or becomes a hollow. In the pit, Ichigo battles through the agony of hollowfication process as he enters his own mind where he encounter the spirit of his zanpakutō who enables him to become a Soul Reaper. Finding himself facing Urahara in the next training exercise, Ichigo learns his zanpakutō's name Zangetsu and manages to transform the blade into a Shikai to defeat Urahara. Finished with his training Ichigo reunites with Orihime, Uryū, Chad, and Yoruichi, as they prepare to go to Soul Society to save Rukia.
9	Fourteen Days for Conspiracy	August 4, 2003; 978-4-08-873495-8	October 10, 2005; 978-1-59116-924-6
71. "INTRUDERZ"; 72. "The Superchunk"; 73. "Drizzly Axes"; 74. "Armlost, Armlost"; 75. "Crimson Rain" (血雨, "Chi Ame"); 76. "Boarrider Comin'"; 77. "My Name Is Ganju" (俺様の名はガンジュ, "Ore-sama no Na wa Ganju"); 78. "meeT 'Em iN tHE basemenT"; 79. "FOURTEEN DAYS FOR CONSPIRACY"
Ichigo and his friends arrive to the Soul Society's Rukongai district with Yoruichi accompanying them. Ichigo quickly finds himself in a battle with the gatekeeper Jidanbō when he carelessly tries to enter the Seireitei where the Soul Reapers reside. Though Ichigo easily defeats Jidanbō, he and his friends are ejected from the Seireitei by Squad Three captain Gin Ichimaru. After an encounter with Ganju Shiba, who claims to be the number one hater of Soul Reapers in the western Rukongai, Ichigo meets Yoruichi's friend who can get them into the Seireitei: Ganju's older sister Kūkaku Shiba. Kūkaku agrees to send the group into the Seireitei using her fireworks cannon.
10	Tattoo on the Sky	November 4, 2003; 978-4-08-873525-2	December 6, 2005; 978-1-4215-0081-2
80. "The Shooting Star Project"; 81. "Twelve-Tone Rendezvous"; 82. "Conflictable Composition"; 83. "COME WITH ME"; 84. "The Shooting Star Project 2 (Tattoo on the Sky)"; 85. "INTRUDERZ 2 (Breakthrough the Roof Mix)"; 86. "Making Good Relations, OK?"; 87. "Dancing with Spears"; 88. "SO UNLUCKY WE ARE"; 88.5. "KARAKURA SUPERHEROES"
In order to use Kūkaku's cannon to enter the Seireitei, Ichigo and his friends must first learn how to focus their spiritual energies into a Spirit Orb, a task Ichigo finds especially difficult. Their group joined by Ganju who helps him learn to create a Sprit Orb, Ichigo learns that Ganju's hatred towards Soul Reapers is because his brother was killed by one. Meanwhile, within the walls of the Seiretei, the Thirteen Court Guard Squad captains have an emergency meeting over the intruders before they are alerted. As the captains take their leave, Squad Ten captain Tōshirō Hitsugaya witnesses Gin being reprimanded by Squad Five Captain Sousuke Aizen over Gin's excuse for allowing the invaders to escape. After Ichigo's group completes their training, seeing that Ichigo is not a bad guy, Ganju decides to join them to see with his own eyes if Soul Reapers are evil or not. However, after being fired at the Seireitei, Ichigo's inability to control his spiritual energy results in the shell exploding and the group split up. Ichigo and Ganju encounter and fight Ikkaku Madarame and Yumichika Ayasegawa of Squad Eleven. Ichigo successfully uses his zanpakutō to defeat Ikkaku.
11	A Star and a Stray Dog	December 19, 2003; 978-4-08-873555-9	February 7, 2006; 978-1-4215-0271-7
89. "Masterly! And Farewell!"; 90. "See You Under the Fireworks"; 91. "DER FREISCHÜTZ King" ("KING OF FREISCHÜTZ"); 92. "Masterly! And Farewell! (Reprise)"; 93. "Steer For The Star"; 94. "A Jail Called Remorse" ("Gaol Named Remorse"); 95. "CRUSH"; 96. "BLOODRED CONFLICT"; 97. "Talk About Your Fear"; 98. "A Star And A Stray Dog" (星と野良犬, "Hoshi to Norainu")
Ganju regroups with Ichigo after defeating Yumichika with exploding fireworks in the Soul Reaper's face. As Uryū and Orihime are confronted by Jirōbō Ikkanzaka, the 4th seat of Squad Seven whom Uryū easily defeats, Ichigo and Ganju manage to elude their pursuers by using the clumsy Squad Four officer Hanatarō Yamada as a distraction. Hanatarō informs them of a shortcut to the cell where Rukia is being held and promises to guide the two there. But Renji, revealed to be lieutenant of Squad Six, confronts them and engages Ichigo in a vicious fight. But in the end, remembering his training under Urahara, Ichigo defeats Renji. Before falling to the ground, Renji recalls his long-time friendship with Rukia and pleas Ichigo to save her.
12	Flower on the Precipice	March 4, 2004; 978-4-08-873576-4	April 4, 2006; 978-1-4215-0403-2
99. "Dead Black War Cloud"; 100. "Flower on the Precipice" (それは岩壁の花に似て, Sore wa Ganpeki no Hana ni Nite); 101. "Split Under the Red Stalk"; 102. "Nobody Beats"; 103. "Dominion"; 104. "The Undead"; 105. "Spring, Spring, Meets the Tiger"; 106. "Cause to Confront"; 107. "Heat in Trust"; 0.8. "a wonderful error"
After Hanatarō and Ganju carry Ichigo to safety so the former can heal him in the tunnels, the heavily injured Renji is incarcerated by his squad captain Byakuya after the other Soul Reapers stopped him from executing his subordinate for being defeated. As the Seireitei has now declared war on the intruders, Hitsugaya suspects Gin's behavior and warns his friend, Squad Five lieutenant Momo Hinamori to be careful around him. Momo finds Aizen dead the following day and attacks Gin on the notion that he is responsible. But it leads to her having a fight with Gin's lieutenant Izuru Kira before Hitsugaya intervenes and has both incarcerated while warning Gin not to harm Momo. Meanwhile, as Chad finds himself outmatched by Squad Eight Captain Shunsui Kyōraku, Ichigo finds himself facing the captain of Squad Eleven: Kenpachi Zaraki.
13	The Undead	June 4, 2004; 978-4-08-873610-5	June 6, 2006; 978-1-4215-0611-1
108. "A Time to Scare" ("Time For Scare"); 109. "Like a Tiger Trying Not to Crush the Flowers" (花を踏まぬ虎のように, "Hana o Fumanu Tora no Yō Ni"); 110. "The Dark Side of the Universe" ("Dark Side of Universe"); 111. "Black & White"; 112. "The Undead 2 (Rise & Rage)" ("The Undead 2 (Rise & Craze)"); 113. "The Undead 3 (Closing Frantica)"; 114. "Everything Relating to the Crumbling World" (崩れゆく世界のすべてについて, "Kuzureyuku Sekai no Subete ni Tsuite"); 115. "Remnant"
After defeating Chad, deeming him not a bad person, Kyōraku decides to have him incarcerated. In his fight against Kenpachi, though terrified of his opponent's overwhelming power, Ichigo finds the resolve to face him. But Kenpachi reveals he has not mastered his zanpakutō and he easily defeats Ichigo. At that time, Ichigo is brought into his inner world by Zangetsu to face another opponent: A hollow personification of Ichigo's that manifested from his training under Urahara. As Ichigo realizes that he knows nothing about Zangetsu and promises to learn more about him, the fight is stopped and Ichigo returns to fight Kenpachi again. This time, he is able to use all the power from Zangetsu, and as a result Ichigo is able to successfully battle Kenpachi to a draw. Kenpachi's lieutenant Yachiru Kusajishi takes him to another place and Kenpachi confesses that he lost because he has never been able to truly know his zanpakutō. Meanwhile, Ganju and Hanatarō find Rukia. But Ganju becomes infuriated when recognizes Rukia as the Soul Reaper who killed his brother Kaien Shiba.
14	White Tower Rocks	September 3, 2004; 978-4-08-873649-5	August 1, 2006; 978-1-4215-0612-8
116. "White Tower Rocks"; 117. "Remnant 2 (Deny the Shadow)"; 118. "Supernal Tag"; 119. "Secret of the Moon"; 120. "Shake Hands with Grenades"; 121. "In Sane We Trust"; 122. "Don't Lose Your Grip"; 123. "Pledge My Pride" ("Pledge My Pride To")
Ichigo awakens after his fight with Kenpachi and learns that Yoruichi is actually a woman. Meanwhile, confronted by Byakuya when he arrived to the prison Ganju faces the Soul Reaper captain and almost got killed as Jūshirō Ukitake, the Captain of Squad Thirteen and Rukia's superior, intervened. Though Ichigo arrives to face Byakuya, Yoruichi knocks Ichigo out and spirits him away. After Ichigo regains consciousness, Yoruichi tells him that she will train him to use his zanpakutō's bankai state. Meanwhile, on their way to Rukia, Orihime and Uryū are attacked by Squad 12's Captain Mayuri Kurotsuchi. A depraved scientist willing to sacrifice his own men, Mayuri reveals that he has experimented on many other Quincies, including Uryū's grandfather Sōken Ishida whose death he was indirectly responsible for.
15	Beginning of the Death of Tomorrow	December 3, 2004; 978-4-08-873682-2	October 3, 2006; 978-1-4215-0613-5
124. "Crying Little People"; 125. "Insanity & Genius"; 126. "The Last of a Void War"; 127. "Beginning of the Death of Tomorrow"; 128. "The Great Joint-Struggle Union"; 129. "Suspicion (of Assassination)" (Note: When released in tankōbon 15, chapter 129 was renamed from "Transcendental Etudes op.1" (超絶技巧練習曲 op.1, "Chōzetsu Gikō Renshūkyoku op.1") to "Suspicion (of Assassination)".); 130. "Suspicion 2 (of Tears)" (Note: When released in tankōbon 15, chapter 130 was renamed from "Transcendental Etudes op.2 [a tempo]" (超絶技巧練習曲 op.2[a tempo], "Chōzetsu Gikō Renshūkyoku op.2 [a tempo]") to "Suspicion 2 (of Tears)".); -17. "Prelude for the Straying Stars" (逸れゆく星々の為の前奏曲, "Hagureyuku Hoshiboshi no Tame no Zensōkyoku")
Uryū uses the forbidden Quincy technique Ransōtengai to overcome the effects Mayuri's zanpakutō and defeats him, receiving the antidote of his opponent's poison from Mayuri's lieutenant Nemu Kurotsuchi. However, Uryū is quickly defeated by Squad Nine Captain Kaname Tōsen and incarcerated. As Ichigo faces a life and death training regiment against Zangetsu to obtain the ability to use Bankai, Kenpachi helps Orihime free her friends so he can find Ichigo and fight him again. At the same time, having got her hands on Aizen's letter, Momo escapes confinement and makes her way to where Hitsugaya confronts Gin over Aizen's murder after he releases Kira. Once there, Momo points her zanpakutō at Hitsugaya and accuses him of killing Aizen.
16	Night of Wijnruit	March 4, 2005; 978-4-08-873777-5	December 5, 2006; 978-1-4215-0614-2
131. "The True Will"; 132. "Creeping Limit"; 133. "Memories in the Rain 2: Nocturne" ("Memories in the Rain 2: The Nocturne"); 134. "Memories in the Rain 2, op.2: Longing for Sanctuary"; 135. "Memories in the Rain 2, op.3: Affected by the Night"; 136. "Memories in the Rain 2, op.4: Night of Wijnruit"; 137. "Surrounding Clutch"; 138. "Private Thoughts" ("Individual Thoughts"); 139. "Drowsy, Bloody, Crazy"
Forced to knock Momo out when she tries to kill him, Hitsugaya furiously attacks Gin. Eventually, Hitsugaya's lieutenant Rangiku Matsumoto intervenes when Gin was about to attack the unconscious Momo, the captain withdrawing rather than go against her. Meanwhile, everyone learns that Rukia's execution date has been moved to the following day with Renji decides to train with Ichigo to obtain his bankai while Jūshirō decides to save his subordinate. But Rukia believes her fate is deserved while reminiscing of her time with Kaien Shiba, Squad Thirteen's lieutenant who she was forced to kill when his body is invaded by the parasitic Hollow Metastica. On the day of the execution, now aiding the intruders, Squad Eleven faces Tōsen's Squad Nine subordinates and Squad Seven under Sajin Komamura.
17	Rosa Rubicundior, Lilio Candidior	June 3, 2005; 978-4-08-873817-8	February 6, 2007; 978-1-4215-1041-5
140. "Bite at the Moon"; 141. "Kneel to the Baboon King"; 142. "To Those Capturing the Moon" (月を捉うものへ告ぐ, "Tsuki o Torau Mono e Tsugu"); 143. "Blazing Souls" (Note: When released in tankōbon 17, chapter 143 was renamed from "Parthian Shaft" to "Blazing Souls".); 144. "Rosa Rubicundior, Lilio Candidior"; 145. "Shaken"; 146. "Demon Loves the Dark"; 147. "Countdown to the End: 3 (Blind Light, Deaf Beat)"; 148. "Countdown to the End: 2 (Lady Lennon~Frankenstein)"; 149. "Countdown to the End: 1 (Only Mercifully)"
Renji attempts to rescue Rukia, but is confronted by his captain, Byakuya. Renji unleashes his bankai Hihiō Zabimaru, only to be overpowered when Byakuya reveals his own bankai Senbonzakura Kageyoshi. Despite being defeated, Renji manages to inflict a minor wound on his captain before collapsing from his injuries as Byakuya congratulates him. Meanwhile, Kenpachi overpowers Tōsen and Komamura with the former forced to use his barrier bankai Suzumushi Tsuishiki Enma Korogi, which removes all of Kenpachi's senses with the exception of his sense of touch. Despite being unable to see Tōsen, Kenpachi allows his opponent inflict wounds on him so he can grab Tōsen and defeat him. However, Kenpachi is stopped from killing Tōsen by Komamura.
18	The Deathberry Returns	August 4, 2005; 978-4-08-873841-3	April 3, 2007; 978-1-4215-1042-2
150. "Countdown to the End: 0"; 151. "The Deathberry Returns" ("Deathberry Returns"); 152. "The Speed Phantom"; 153. "Empty Dialogue"; 154. "'Flash Master'" ("God of Flash"); 155. "Redoundable Deeds/Redoubtable Babies"; 156. "Welcome to Purgatory"; 157. "Cat and Hornet"; 158. "Sky Leopardess"
Tōsen is saved by Komamura, who starts to fight Kenpachi with his Bankai Kokujō Tengen Myō'ō. Meanwhile, Rukia arrives at the execution grounds and accepts her sentence while making a request to Head Captain Shigekuni Yamamoto-Genryūsai, the leader of the Thirteen Court Squads, to spare Ichigo and his friends and send them home. But as Ichigo arrives to save her, the phoenix-like executioner zanpakutō Sōkyoku is destroyed by Jūshirō and Shunsui. While Jūshirō and Shunsui are faced by Genryūsai for their transgressions, with Yoruchi battling her Squad Two lieutenant turned captain Soi Fon, Ichigo throws Rukia to Renji to get her to safety while he encounters Byakuya.
19	The Black Moon Rising	October 4, 2005; 978-4-08-873862-8	June 5, 2007; 978-1-4215-1043-9
159. "LONG WAY TO SAY GOODBYE"; 160. "Battle on Guillotine Hill"; 161. "Scratch the Sky"; 162. "Black Moon Rising"; 163. "THE Speed Phantom 2 (Denial by Pride, Contradiction by Power)"; 164. "The One Who Changed the World"; 165. "The Dark Side of the Universe 2" ("Dark Side of Universe 2"); 166. "Black & White 2"; 167. "Death Chamber"; 168. "Behind Me, Behind You"
Revealed to have been loyal to Yoruichi while her lieutenant before bearing a grudge her former captain for abandoning her and the Soul Society, Soi Fon finally breaks down upon being outmatched by Yoruichi. Meanwhile, Ichigo and Byakuya take their fight to the next level by releasing their bankai. With his bankai Tensa Zangetsu, Ichigo's speed considerably increases to overpower Byakuya. However, Ichigo cannot fully control his bankai and as he is about to be defeated, his inner-hollow temporarily assumes control of his body. But Ichigo manages to suppress his inner-hollow before he and Byakuya focus the remainder of their powers in a final clash. Explaining to he allowed Rukia's execution he values the law above all else, Byakuya admits defeat as Ichigo has convinced him not to execute Rukia. Meanwhile, Tōshirō Hitsugaya and Rangiku Matsumoto head to the Central 46 Chambers, learning the members of the highest authority in the Soul Society are all dead.
20	End of Hypnosis	December 2, 2005; 978-4-08-873883-3	August 7, 2007; 978-1-4215-1044-6
-12.5. "Blooming Under a Cold Moon"; 169. "end of hypnosis"; 170. "end of hypnosis2 (the Galvanizer)"; 171. "end of hypnosis3 (the Blue Fog)"; 172. "end of hypnosis4 (Prisoners in Paradise)"; 173. "end of hypnosis5 (Standing to Defend You)"; 174. "end of hypnosis6 (The United Front)"; 175. "end of hypnosis7 (Truth Under My Strings)"; 176. "end of hypnosis8 (the Transfixion)"; 177. "end of hypnosis9 (Encompassed)"; 178. "end of hypnosis10 (No One Stands On the Sky)"
Finding the members of the Central 46 Chambers all dead, Hitsugaya pursues Kira who reveals that Momo had also entered the Central 46 Chambers. Guided by Gin, Momo learns that Aizen is alive before her captain impales her with his zanpakuto. When Hitsugaya arrives, informed by Aizen that Gin was actually his co-conspirator, Hitsugaya unleashes his bankai to avenge Momo. But Aizen defeats Hitsugaya and almost kills him before Squad Four Captain Retsu Unohana appears, denouncing Aizen's treachery. Aizen then informs her that every Soul Reaper in the Soul Society has been under the hypnosis of his zanpakutō, with the exception of the blind Tōsen who is revealed to be Aizen's other accomplice. As Unohana's lieutenant Isane Kotetsu relays the revelation to all high-ranking Thirteen Court Guard Squad members, Aizen arrives to Tōsen's location after he brought Rukia and Renji. After Ichigo, Renji, and Komamura were all defeated, Aizen explains the entire execution was arranged so he can obtain the Hōgyoku, an orb that would allow him to gain hollow powers that was hidden in Rukia's gigai by Urahara. After extracting the Hōgyoku from her body, with the Thirteen Court Guard Squads surrounding them, Aizen and his accomplices use several hollows to escape into a portal leading to the hollows' world Hueco Mundo.
21	Be My Family or Not	March 3, 2006; 978-4-08-874027-0	October 2, 2007; 978-1-4215-1165-8
179. "Confession in the Twilight"; 180. "Something in the Aftermath"; 181. "AND THE RAIN LEFT OFF"; 182. "GET BACK FROM THE STORM (TRIGGER FOR A NEW CONCERTO)"; 183. "eyes of the unknown"; 184. "HUSH"; 185. "Be My Family or Not"; 186. "Tell Your Children the Truth"; 187. "THE CIGAR BLUES, PART TWO"
As the Soul Reapers are being healed, Byakuya confesses to Rukia that he adopted her as the dying wish of her sister, his wife Hisana, and apologizes for being unable to act on her behalf because of his promise to his family to uphold the law from that point on. As Ichigo and his friends return to the human world, Rukia decides to remain in the Soul Society. As the fall semester begins, Ichigo meets a new student named Shinji Hirako, who reveals himself to be a Visard, a Soul Reaper who has obtained Hollow powers. With his powers gone, Uryū is attacked by a Hollow and is rescued by his father, Ryūken Ishida who decides to train him to recover his lost powers. Kon, who is in Ichigo's body, is attacked by the hollow Grand Fisher who was transformed into an Arrancar, a humanized Hollow with Soul Reaper-like powers. Grand Fisher attacks Kon, believing that he is really attacking Ichigo, before Ichigo's father Isshin Kurosaki arrives to the Modsoul's defense. As Grand Fisher draws his zanpakutō to enter a stronger form, Isshin reveals himself as a former Soul reaper as he easily kills Grand Fisher in a single attack.
