= Rubicon Springs, California =

Rubicon Springs
- Former settlement
- Location in California
- Coordinates: 39°01′03″N 120°14′56″W
- Country: United States
- State: California
- County: El Dorado
- Elevation: 6,165 ft (1,879 m)

Rubicon Springs is a set of springs that was used as a resort from the 1860s in El Dorado County, California, United States. It laid at an elevation of 6165 feet (1879 m). It still appeared on maps as of 1940. The natural springs were harnessed for a resort by the 1860s. By 1909, a hotel and summer cottages had been erected.
