= Rubicon Technology =

American crystal technology company

Rubicon Technology Inc.
- Company type: Public
- Traded as: Nasdaq: RBCN
- Industry: Material, sapphire substrates
- Founded: 2001
- Headquarters: United States
- Website: rubicontechnology.com

Rubicon Technology, Inc. is an American company specializing in sapphire crystal growth and large-diameter sapphire technology. Their improvement to the Kyropoulos technology is known as "ES2", and was developed in their Illinois-based crystal growth facilities. Rubicon Technology has been producing the industry's first 12-inch sapphire wafer since 2010, and has shipped millions of wafers and core products in sizes from 2" to 12" since 2001. The company's products have been used in the LED industry and for the production of silicon on sapphire wafers for integrated circuits (RFICs), as well as on high-quality optical and industrial applications for high-performance sapphire.

== History ==
In 2000, Rubicon Technology began its commercial production and was incorporated in 2001. The company successfully grew a 30 kg sapphire boule in 2002. In 2003, its polishing capacity was added, and it received ISO 9001 certification in the following year. In 2013, Rubicon launched 4" and 6" Patterned Sapphire Substrates, extending vertical integration "from powder to pattern".

== Products ==
Rubicon Technology is engaged in developing, manufacturing and selling monocrystalline sapphire and other crystalline products for light-emitting diodes, radio-frequency integrated circuits, optoelectronics, and other optical applications.

Rubicon Technology produces Patterned Sapphire Substrates in 4" through 8" diameters. The company also produces sapphire ingots, which are used as raw material for further fabrication. Additionally, Rubicon produces optical windows, with applications ranging from defense/aerospace and instrumentation to medical devices and polished epi-ready substrates.
