= Emerald Bay State Park =

State park in California, United States

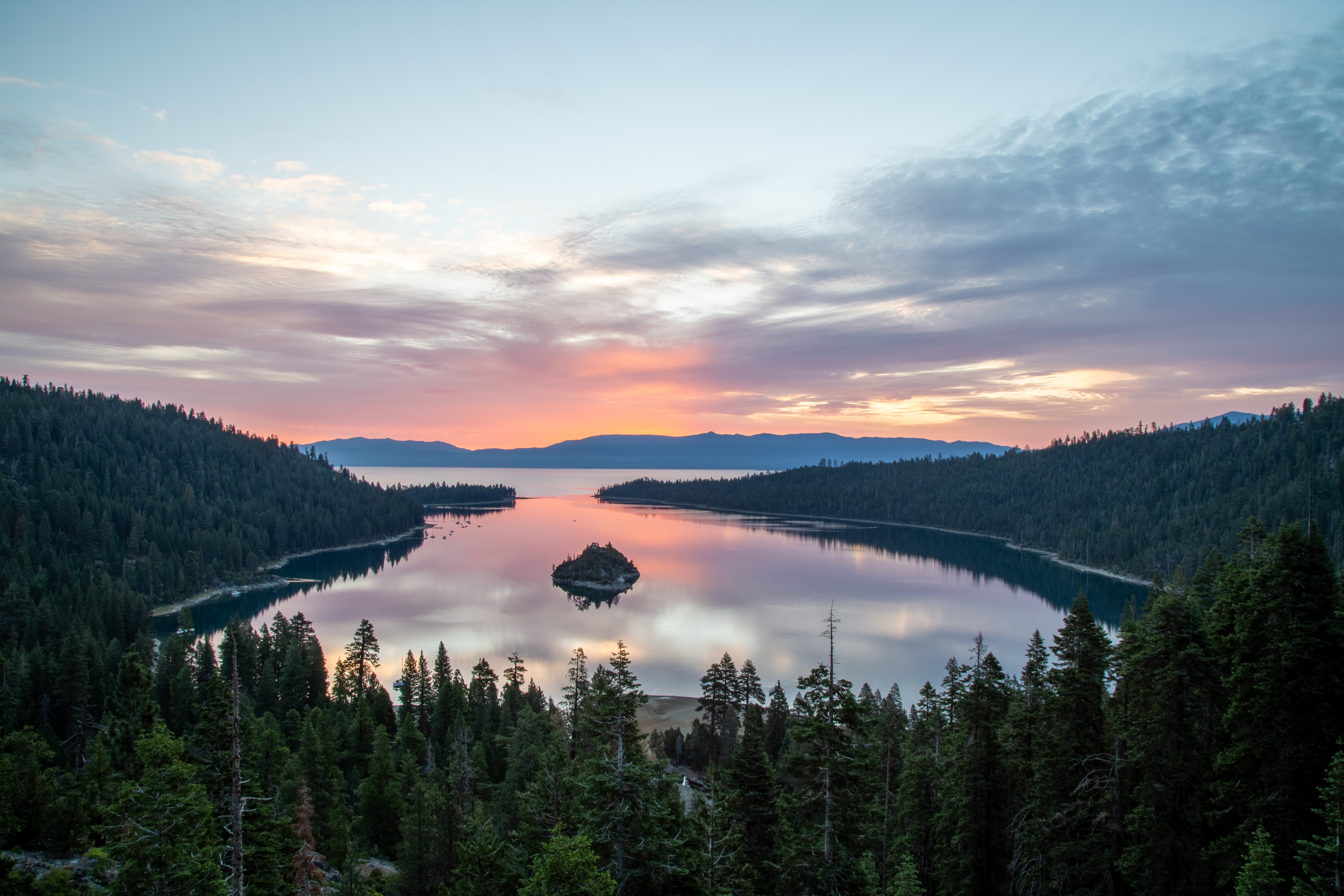
- Emerald Bay, with Fannette Island

- Location within California Location within the United States
- Location: El Dorado County, California, United States
- Nearest city: Tahoma, California
- Coordinates: 38°57′13″N 120°5′38″W
- Area: 1,533 acres (6.20 km^{2})
- Established: 1953
- Governing body: California Department of Parks and Recreation

U.S. National Natural Landmark
- Designated: 1968

Emerald Bay State Park is a state park of California in the United States, centered on Lake Tahoe's Emerald Bay, a National Natural Landmark. Park features include Eagle Falls and Vikingsholm, a 38-room mansion that is considered one of the finest examples of Scandinavian architecture in the United States. The architect was Leonard Palme, who was hired by his aunt Lora Josephine Knight to design and build Vikingsholm. The park contains the only island in Lake Tahoe, Fannette Island. The park is accessible by California State Route 89 near the southwest shore of the lake. Emerald Bay is one of Lake Tahoe's most photographed and popular locations.

In 1969 Emerald Bay was recognized as a National Natural Landmark by the federal Department of the Interior. In 1994 California State Parks included the surrounding water of the bay as a part of the park, making Emerald Bay one of the first underwater parks of its type in the state, protecting the various wrecks and other items on the bay's bottom.

The 1,533-acre (620 ha) park was established in 1953. It is located directly south of D. L. Bliss State Park.

Summer temperatures at the park range from the low 40 °F (4 °C) at night to mid-70 °F (21 °C) during the day, and during the winter visitors will usually experience temperatures between 20 and 40 °F (−7 and 4 °C). During harsh winters the bay freezes over. The bay is about 1.7 miles (2.7 km) in length, and about two-thirds of a mile (1 km) wide at its widest point.

== Gallery ==
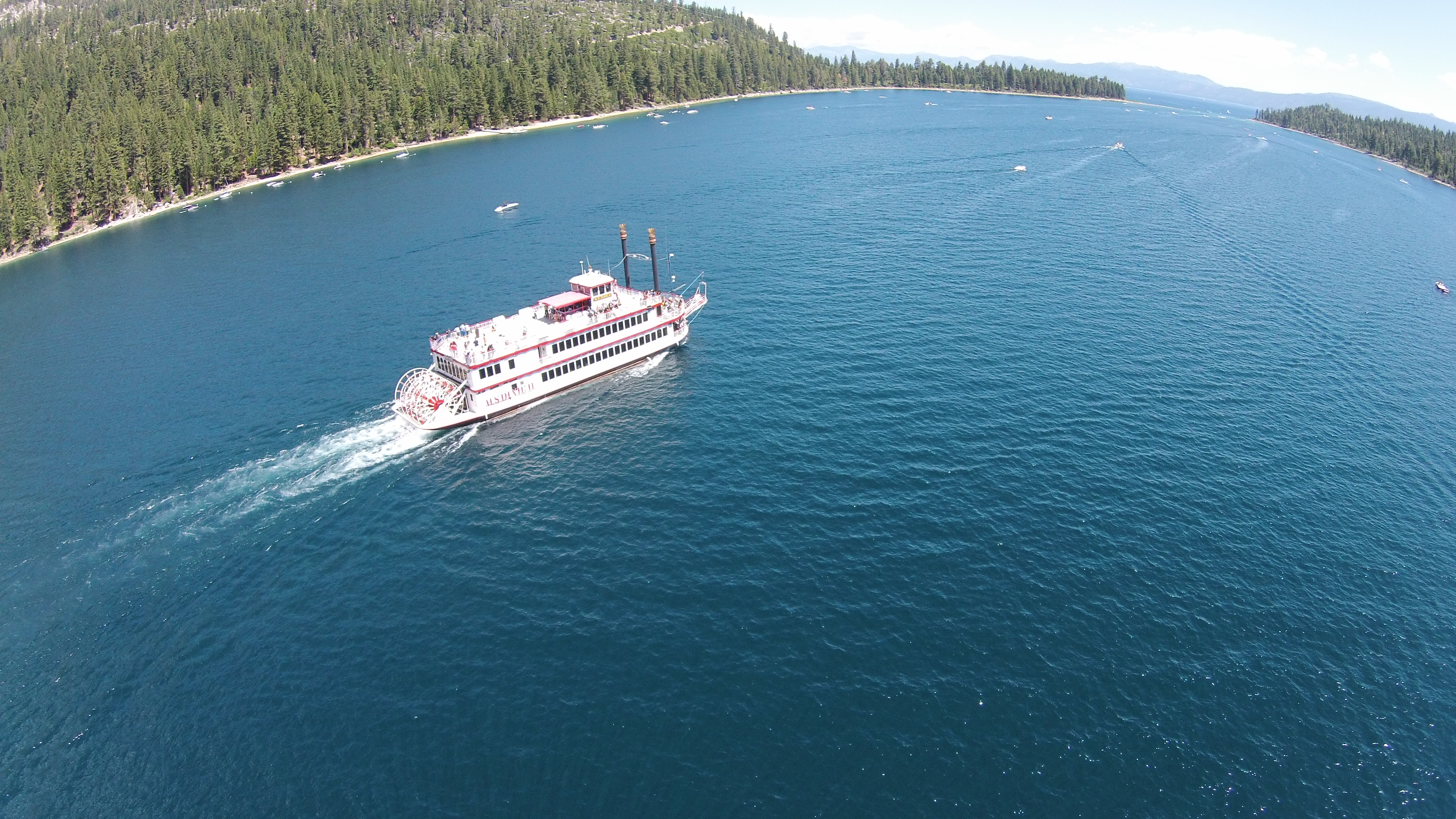
Aerial of Emerald Bay looking north

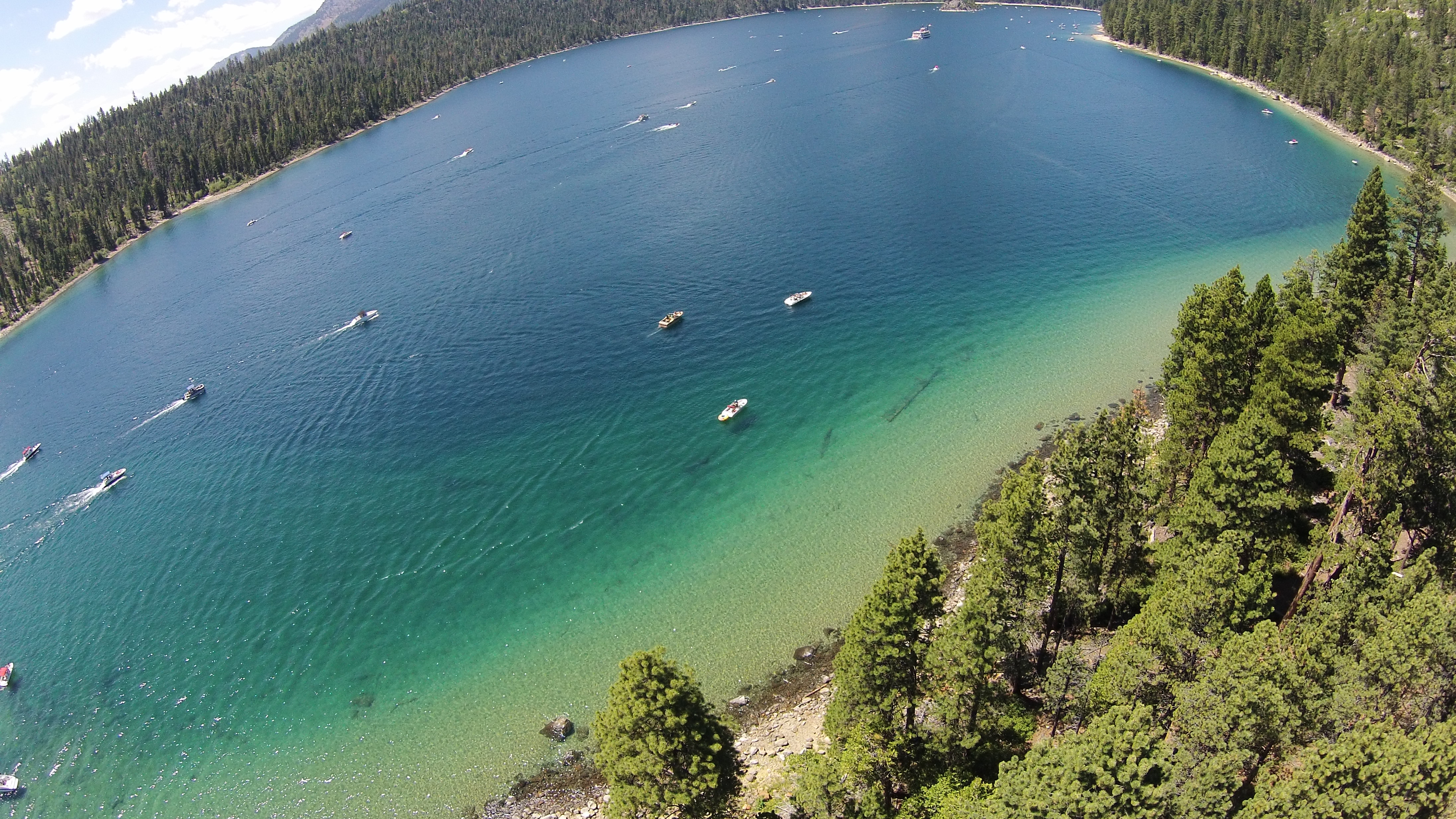
Aerial View of Emerald Bay

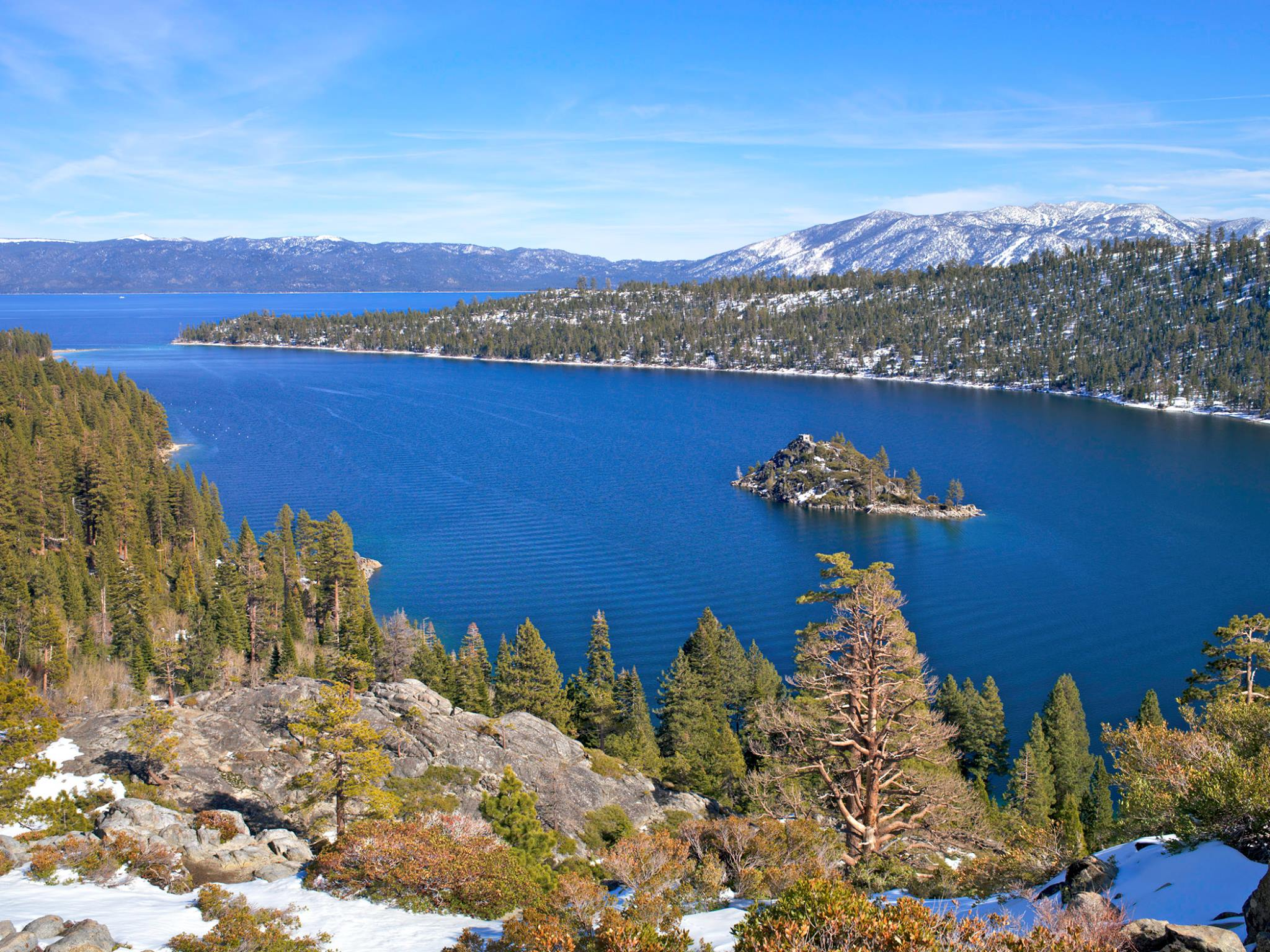
Hiker's view

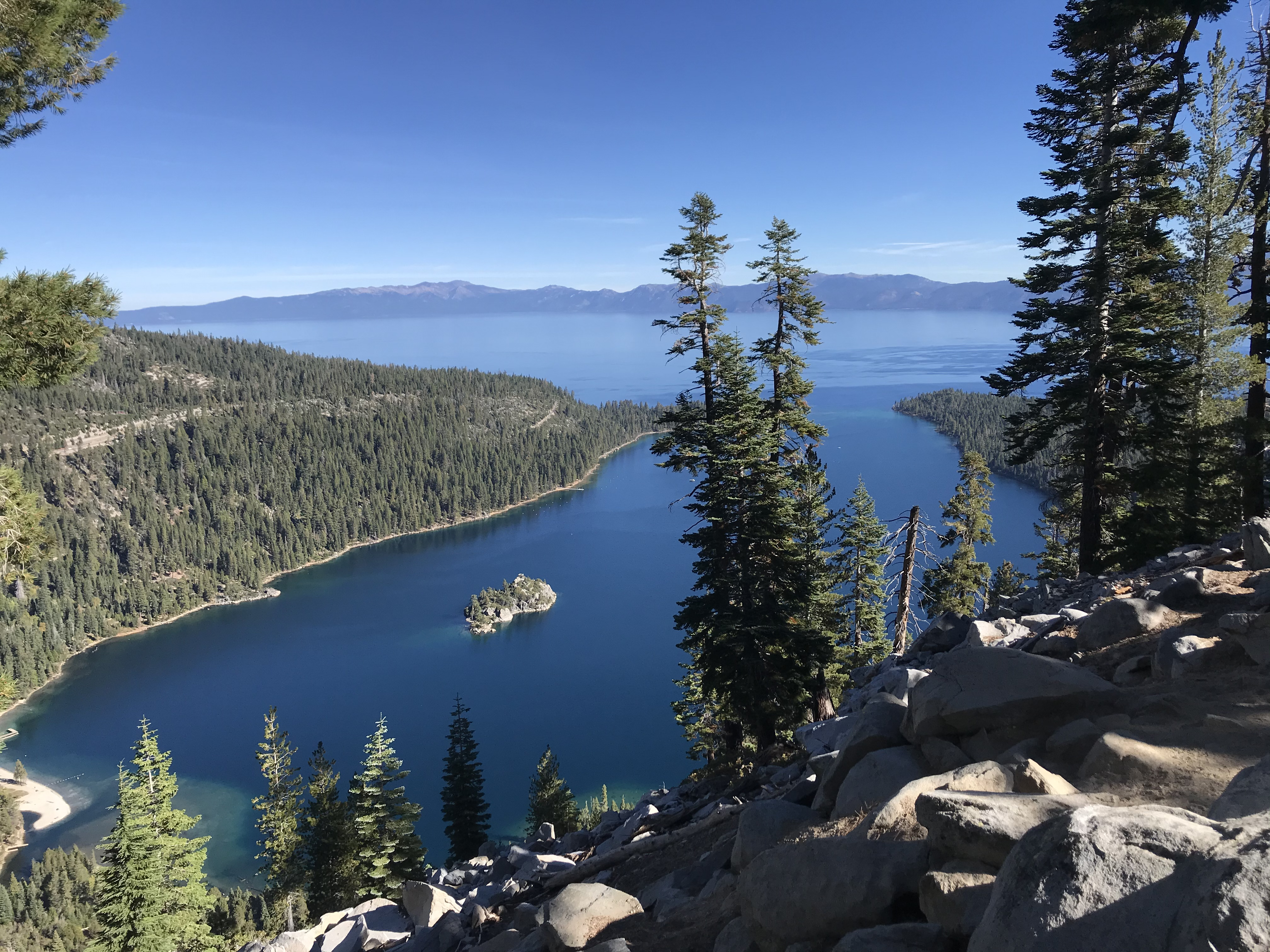
Another view from a hiking trail

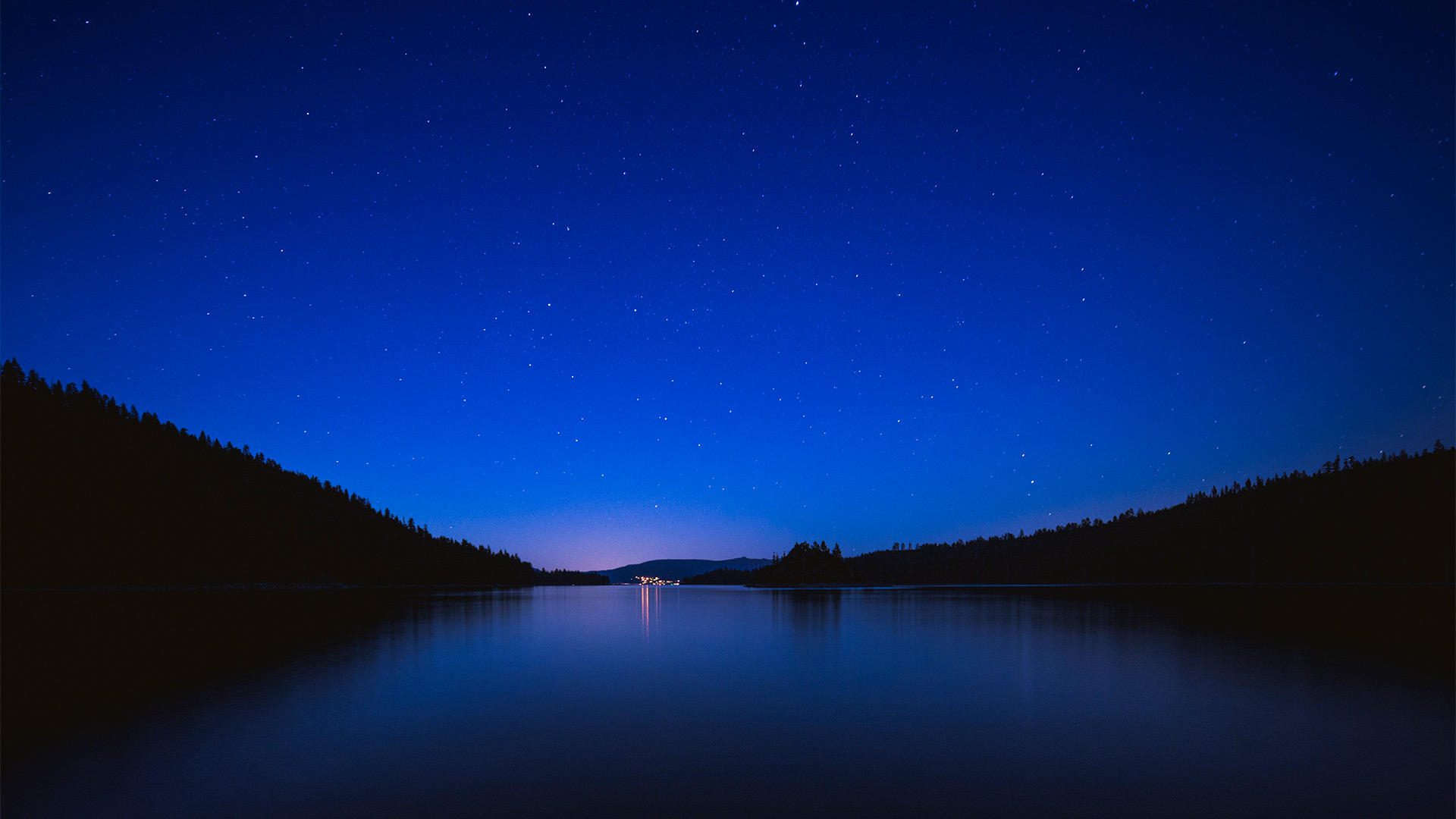
Night view

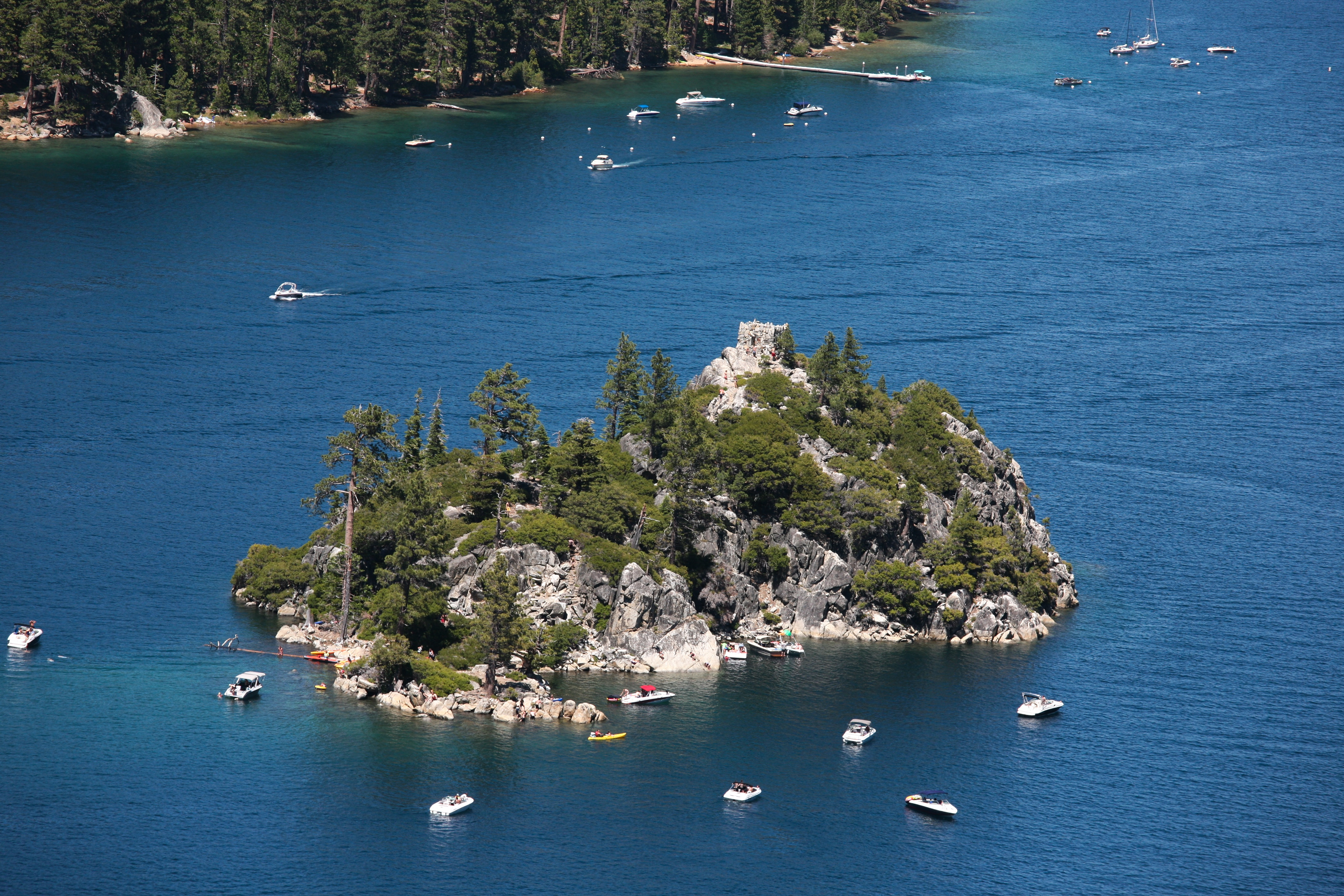
Close up of Fannette Island

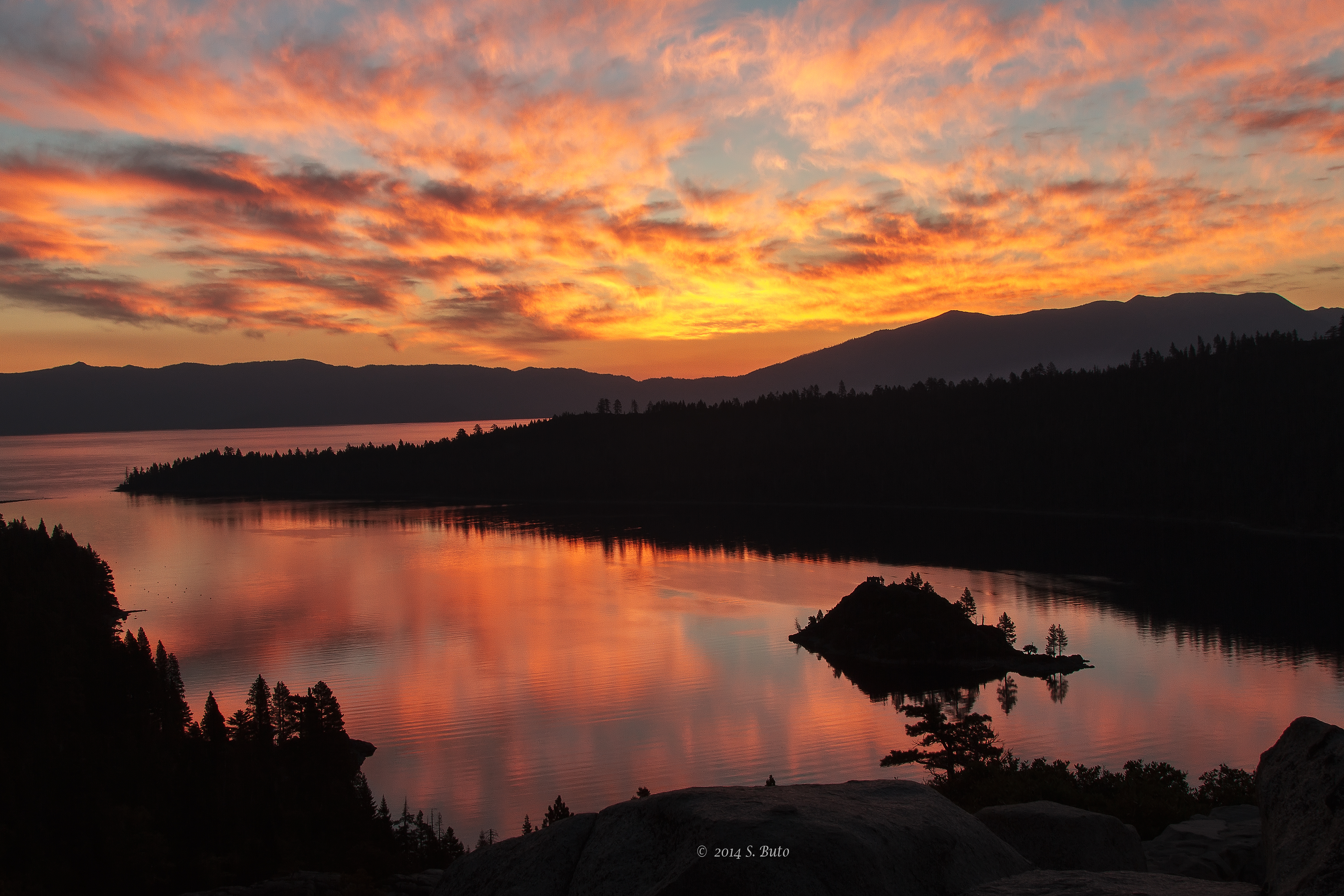
Sunset

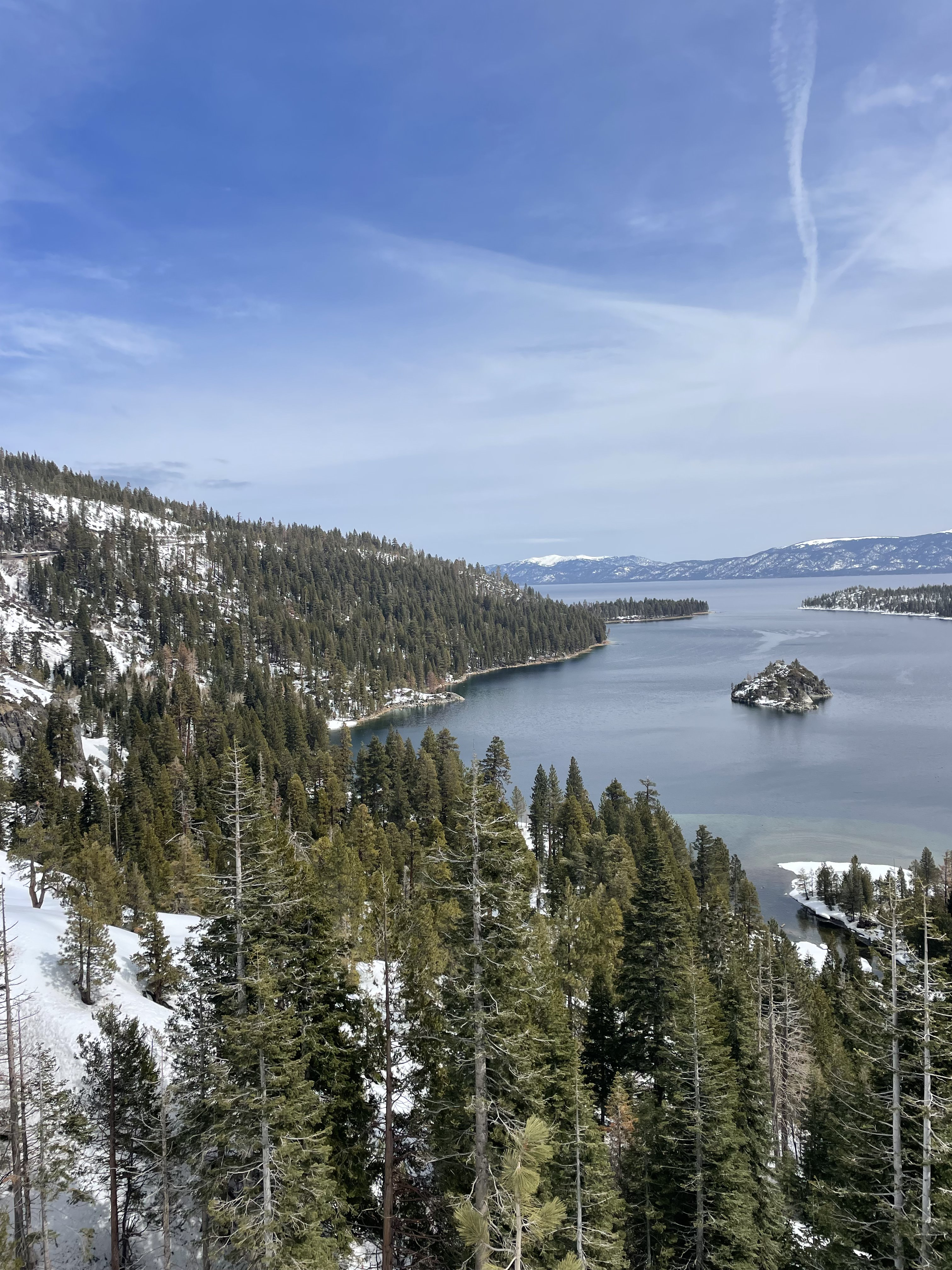
Emerald Bay in winter

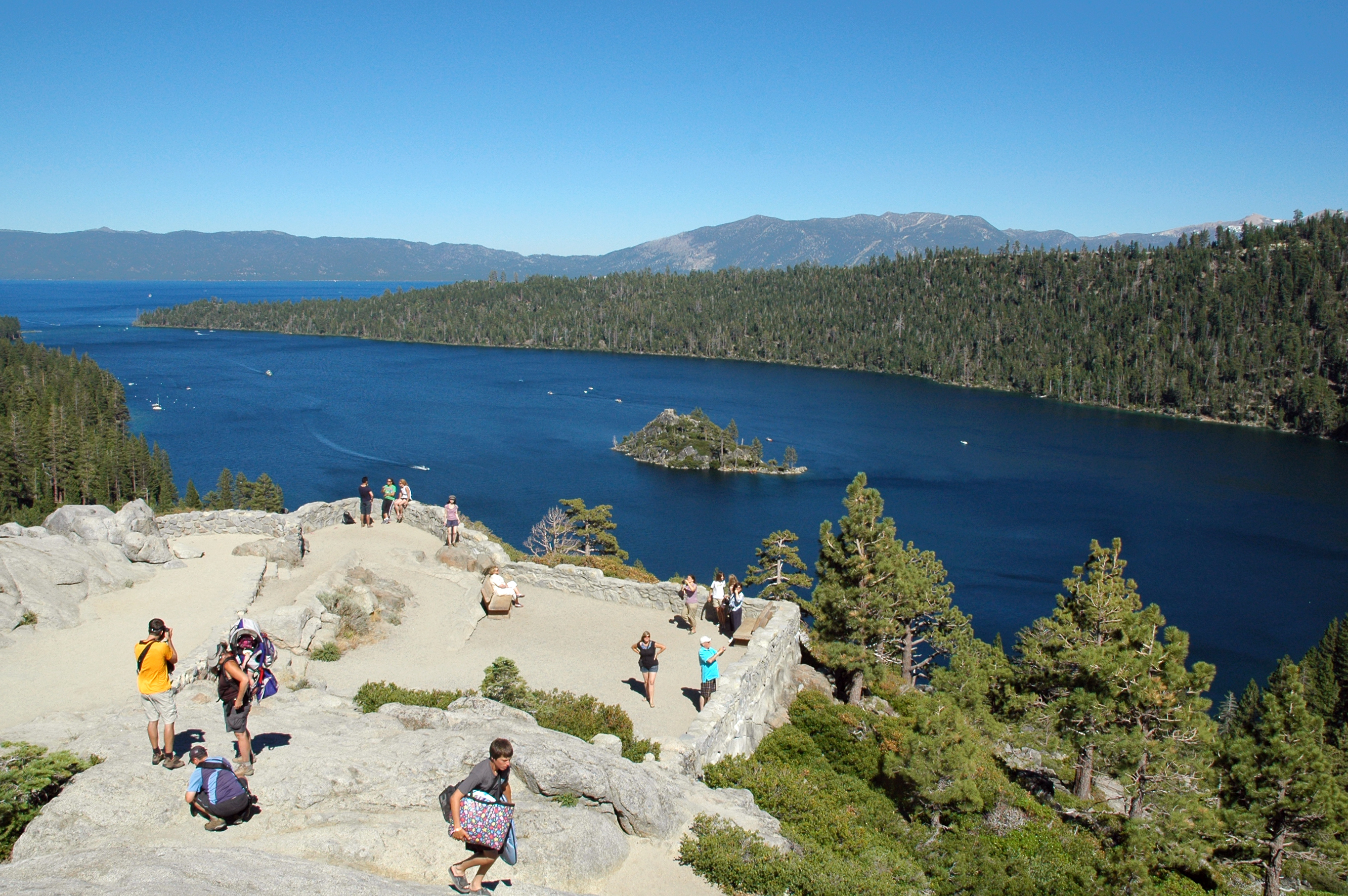
Lookout
