= United States at the Olympics =

- Flag of the United States
- IOC code: USA
- NOC: United States Olympic & Paralympic Committee
- Website: www.teamusa.com
- Medals Ranked 1st: Gold 1,232 Silver 1,013 Bronze 892 Total 3,137

Summer appearances
- 1896; 1900; 1904; 1908; 1912; 1920; 1924; 1928; 1932; 1936; 1948; 1952; 1956; 1960; 1964; 1968; 1972; 1976; 1980; 1984; 1988; 1992; 1996; 2000; 2004; 2008; 2012; 2016; 2020; 2024; 2028

Winter appearances
- 1924; 1928; 1932; 1936; 1948; 1952; 1956; 1960; 1964; 1968; 1972; 1976; 1980; 1984; 1988; 1992; 1994; 1998; 2002; 2006; 2010; 2014; 2018; 2022; 2026

Other related appearances
- 1906 Intercalated Games

The United States of America has sent athletes to every celebration of the modern Olympic Games with the exception of the 1980 Summer Olympics, during which it led a boycott in protest of the Soviet Union's invasion of Afghanistan. The United States Olympic & Paralympic Committee (USOPC) is the National Olympic Committee for the United States.

American athletes have won a total of 2,774 medals (1,106 of them gold) at the Summer Olympic Games, and another 363 (126 of them gold) at the Winter Olympic Games, making the United States the most prolific medal-winning nation in the history of the Olympics. The U.S. has placed first in the Summer Olympic medal table 19 times out of 30 Summer Olympics and 29 appearances (having boycotted in 1980), but has had less success in the Winter Olympics, placing first once in 24 participations. The United States have been the host nation for the modern Olympics on eight occasions so far.

The United States Olympic contingent is the only Olympic contingent in the world to receive no government funding; neither training and development costs nor prize money are provided by the U.S. national government.

== Hosted Games ==
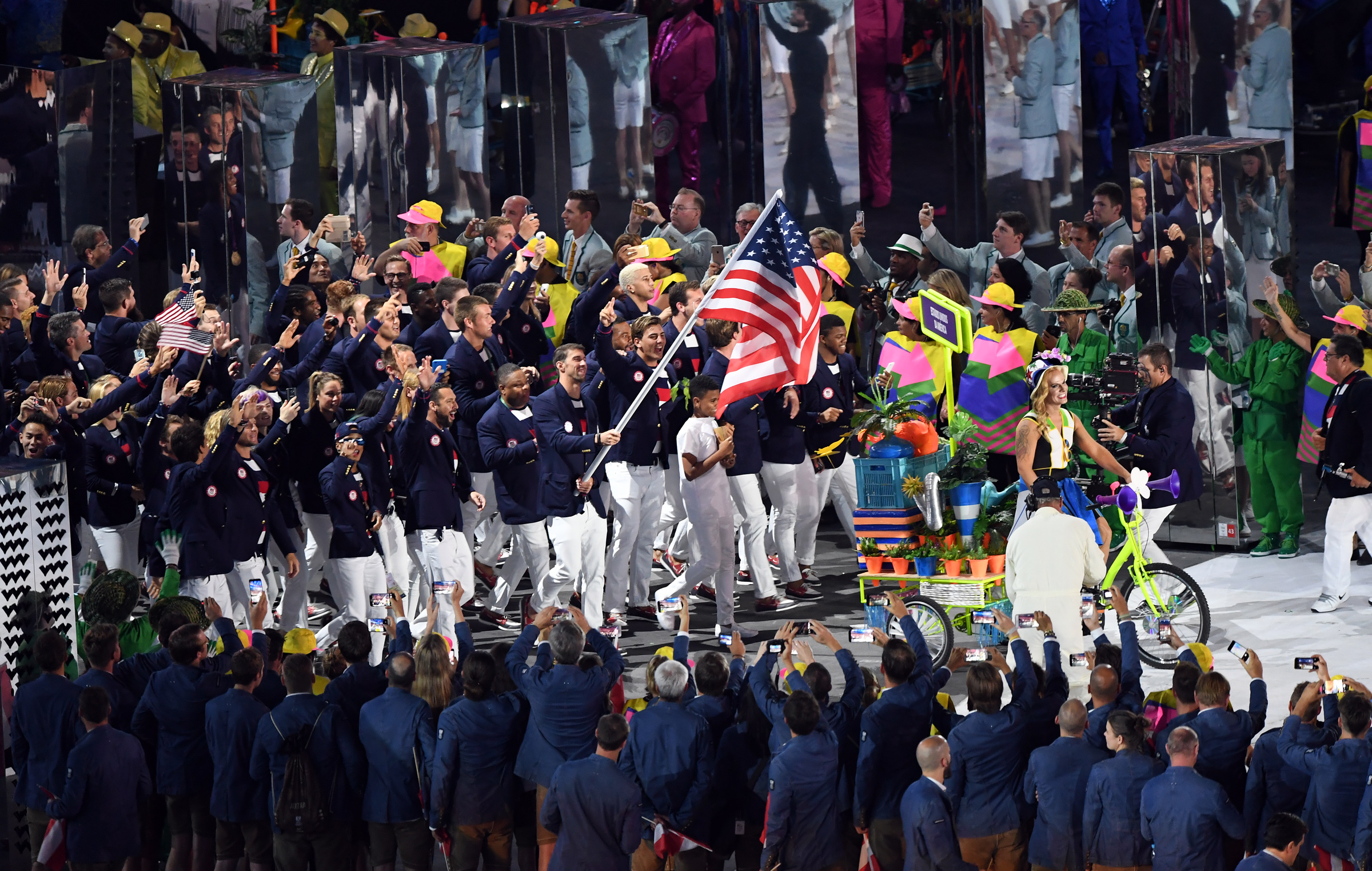
Michael Phelps carrying the flag on behalf of athletes from the United States during the parade of nations at the 2016 Summer Olympics. With 28 Olympic medals (23 of them gold), he is the most decorated Olympian of all time.

The United States has hosted the modern Olympic Games eight times, more than any other nation. These occasions span from the 1904 St. Louis Olympics to the 2002 Salt Lake City Winter Olympics. Beyond hosting, the U.S. has significantly impacted the Olympics through athletic achievements, innovations in sports infrastructure and technology, and cultural contributions. Its influence extends to advocating Olympic ideals and leaving lasting legacies in host cities. Overall, the U.S. plays a central role in the history and ongoing development of the Olympic movement. For example, the 1932 Los Angeles Olympics pioneered the use of electronic timing devices. The 1984 Los Angeles Olympics set new standards for opening and closing ceremonies, as well as being the first privately financed and commercially successful games in history. Hosting the Olympics has also left lasting legacies in host cities, such as improved infrastructure, economic benefits, and increased tourism. For example, the 1996 Atlanta Olympics revitalized parts of the city and left behind sporting venues still in use today.

In 2028, the third Los Angeles Olympics will mark the ninth occasion that the Olympics are hosted in the U.S.

Games	Host city	Dates	Nations	Participants	Events
1904 Summer Olympics	St. Louis, Missouri	July 1 – November 23	12	666	95
1932 Winter Olympics	Lake Placid, New York	February 7 – 15	17	252	14
1932 Summer Olympics	Los Angeles, California	July 30 – August 14	37	1,332	117
1960 Winter Olympics	Squaw Valley, California	February 18 – 28	30	665	27
1980 Winter Olympics	Lake Placid, New York	February 13 – 24	37	1,072	38
1984 Summer Olympics	Los Angeles, California	July 28 – August 12	140	6,829	221
1996 Summer Olympics	Atlanta, Georgia	July 19 – August 4	197	10,318	271
2002 Winter Olympics	Salt Lake City, Utah	February 8 – 24	77	2,399	78
2028 Summer Olympics	Los Angeles, California	July 14 – 30	TBA	TBA	TBA
2034 Winter Olympics	Salt Lake City, Utah	February 10 – 26	TBA	TBA	TBA

=== Unsuccessful bids ===
Games	City	Winner of bid
1916 Summer Olympics	Cleveland	Berlin
1920 Summer Olympics	Atlanta; Cleveland; Philadelphia	Antwerp
1924 Summer Olympics	Los Angeles	Paris
1928 Summer Olympics	Los Angeles	Amsterdam
1944 Summer Olympics	Detroit	London
1948 Winter Olympics	Lake Placid	St Moritz
1948 Summer Olympics	Baltimore; Los Angeles; Minneapolis; Philadelphia	London
1952 Winter Olympics	Lake Placid	Oslo
1952 Summer Olympics	Chicago; Detroit; Los Angeles; Minneapolis; Philadelphia	Helsinki
1956 Winter Olympics	Colorado Springs; Lake Placid	Cortina d'Ampezzo
1956 Summer Olympics	Chicago; Detroit; Los Angeles; Minneapolis; Philadelphia; San Francisco	Melbourne
1960 Summer Olympics	Detroit	Rome
1964 Summer Olympics	Detroit	Tokyo
1968 Winter Olympics	Lake Placid	Grenoble
1968 Summer Olympics	Detroit	Mexico City
1972 Winter Olympics	Salt Lake City	Sapporo
1972 Summer Olympics	Detroit	Munich
1976 Summer Olympics	Los Angeles	Montreal
1980 Summer Olympics	Los Angeles	Moscow
1992 Winter Olympics	Anchorage	Albertville
1994 Winter Olympics	Anchorage	Lillehammer
1998 Winter Olympics	Salt Lake City	Nagano
2012 Summer Olympics	New York City	London
2016 Summer Olympics	Chicago	Rio de Janeiro

=== Relinquished hosting rights ===
Games	City	Eventually hosted by
1976 Winter Olympics	Denver	Innsbruck

== Medal tables ==
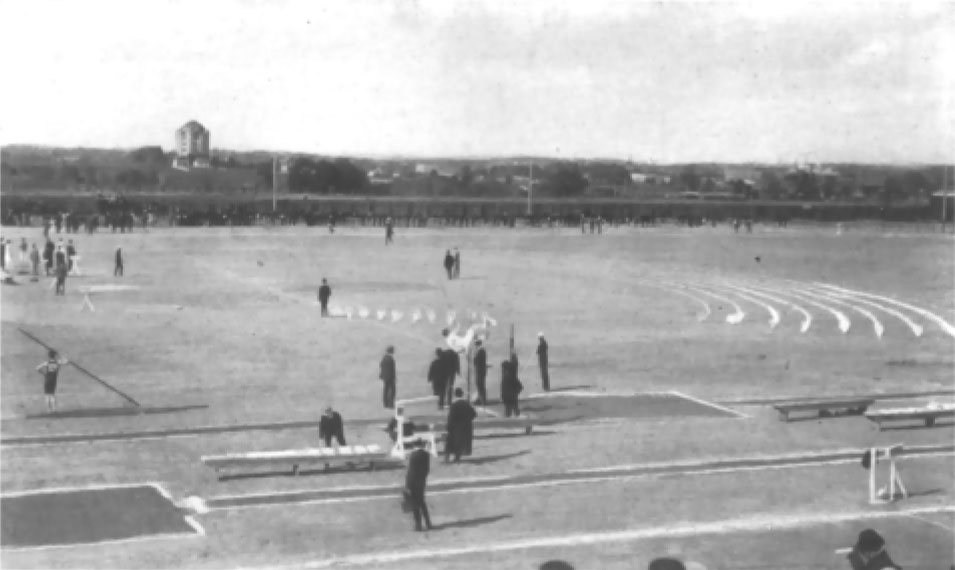
Francis Olympic Field of Washington University in St. Louis, site of the 1904 Olympic Games. The 1904 Summer Olympics in St. Louis, Missouri were the first Olympic Games held outside of Europe.

The United States made its Olympic debut in 1896 in Athens, the very first edition of the modern games. The nation performed inconsistently in the pre-World War-I period, primarily due to fielding considerably fewer athletes than host countries, with the exception being the 1904 Olympics in St. Louis, Missouri, where the U.S. achieved its largest medal haul in history, a record that still stands today. During the interwar period, the U.S. enjoyed its greatest success, topping both gold and total medal counts at four straight Summer Games, before falling short in the 1936 Berlin games. The next summer Olympics were held in 1948 following World War II. In 1952, the Soviet Union made its Olympic debut, initiating a state-sponsored approach to international sport focused on projecting socio-political superiority. The rapid rise of the Soviet Union to challenge the United States as a leading Olympic power raised questions and suspicion about the means used to achieve this, including the pretense of professional athletes having amateur status and allegations of state-sponsored doping. After 20 years of competition on the Olympic stage, the USSR convincingly topped the gold medal chart at the 1972 Summer Olympics in Munich. After that, the U.S. would not top the medal table in non-boycotted games until the 1996 Summer Olympics, five years after the USSR collapsed. A bright spot for the United States was the 1984 games in Los Angeles, where the U.S. set a record for most gold medals won in a single Olympics (83), buoyed by the Soviet-led boycott. Coincident with a drive by the International Olympic Committee toward gender parity beginning in the 1990s, the U.S.'s fortunes improved, and the nation topped the medal table in the Summer Olympics six times since 1992 and placed second on two occasions.

In contrast to its summer Olympics status, the United States was not a power in the Winter Games until the 2002 Olympics in Salt Lake City. Hosting the games in 2002 boosted the U.S. winter sports program; since then, the country's athletes have performed consistently well, never placing below fourth in the medal count. The nation won the most medals (37) at the 2010 Winter Olympics in Vancouver but dropped to 23 medals at the 2018 games in Pyeongchang.

=== Medals by Summer Games ===
Host country

Games	Athletes	Gold	Silver	Bronze	Total	Gold medal	Total medal
1896 Athens	14	11	7	2	20	1	2
1900 Paris	75	20	13	15	48	2	2
1904 St. Louis	526	80	85	83	248	1	1
1908 London	122	23	12	12	47	2	2
1912 Stockholm	174	25	19	19	63	1	2
1920 Antwerp	288	41	27	27	95	1	1
1924 Paris	299	45	27	27	99	1	1
1928 Amsterdam	280	22	18	16	56	1	1
1932 Los Angeles	474	41	32	30	103	1	1
1936 Berlin	359	24	20	12	56	2	2
1948 London	300	38	27	19	84	1	1
1952 Helsinki	286	40	19	17	76	1	1
1956 Melbourne	297	32	25	17	74	2	2
1960 Rome	292	34	21	16	71	2	2
1964 Tokyo	346	36	26	28	90	1	2
1968 Mexico City	357	45	28	34	107	1	1
1972 Munich	400	33	31	30	94	2	2
1976 Montreal	396	34	35	25	94	3	2
1980 Moscow	boycotted						
1984 Los Angeles	522	83	61	30	174	1	1
1988 Seoul	527	36	31	27	94	3	3
1992 Barcelona	545	37	34	37	108	2	2
1996 Atlanta	646	44	32	25	101	1	1
2000 Sydney	586	37	24	32	93	1	1
2004 Athens	533	36	39	26	101	1	1
2008 Beijing	588	36	39	37	112	2	1
2012 London	530	48	26	32	106	1	1
2016 Rio de Janeiro	554	46	37	38	121	1	1
2020 Tokyo	615	39	41	33	113	1	1
2024 Paris	592	40	44	42	126	1	1
2028 Los Angeles	future event						
2032 Brisbane	future event						
Total (29/30)	11,523	1,106	880	788	2,774	1	1

Notes

- ^{ART} Art competitions (1912–1948) are not included in the medal table above, as they were non-sports events formerly part of the Olympic Games. (Note: In 1952, art competition medals, as well as the gold medal awards for feats in alpinism and aeronautics, were removed from the official national medal counts. Only since 2021 have they been officially listed again by the IOC in the medal tables and respective National Olympic Committee (NOC) profiles on its website.) The United States won a total of 9 art competition medals (4 gold, and 5 silver), across the 1912, 1932, and 1936 Summer Olympics.
- ^{NAT} Athletes at the early Olympic Games (1896, 1900, and 1904) are attributed by the International Olympic Committee (IOC) according to the national affiliation of their club or team, rather than their nationality. (Note: In 2024, the IOC reinstated its original and current attribution policy for athletes at the early Olympic Games (1896, 1900, and 1904). From 2021 to 2024, the IOC briefly attributed medals in individual events according to the athlete's nationality, even when the athlete represented a foreign club or team. Since 2024, participation and medals have instead been attributed according to the national affiliation of the club or team represented by the athlete.)
  - 1900 Olympic Games:
    Canadian George Orton (CAN) won a gold medal and a bronze medal in athletics; as a representative of an American club, his results were attributed to the United States. Conversely, American Pauline Whittier (silver in golf) represented a Swiss club, while Abbie Pratt (bronze in golf) represented a French club; their medals were therefore attributed to Switzerland and France, respectively.
  - 1904 Olympic Games:
    Austrian Julius Lenhart (AUT) (gymnastics; one gold and one silver), Norwegians Bernhoff Hansen (NOR) and Charles Ericksen (NOR) (wrestling; one gold each), Frenchman Albert Corey (FRA) (athletics; one silver), Australian Francis Gailey (AUS) (swimming; three silver and one bronze), German Frank Kugler (GER) (wrestling and weightlifting; one silver and two bronze), Austrian Otto Wahle (AUT) (swimming; one bronze), and Swiss Gustav Tiefenthaler (SUI) (wrestling; one bronze) represented American clubs, and their results were attributed to the United States.
- ^{MIX} At the 1904 Summer Olympics three team event medals (1 gold, 1 silver, and 1 bronze) won by American clubs competing as mixed teams—composed primarily of American athletes alongside a few non-American participants—were attributed to the United States: gold in the gymnastics team all-around, silver in the 4 mile team race, and bronze in the tug of war team competition.

=== Medals by Winter Games ===
Host country

Games	Athletes	Gold	Silver	Bronze	Total	Gold medal	Total medal
1924 Chamonix	24	1	2	1	4	5	3
1928 St. Moritz	24	2	2	2	6	2	2
1932 Lake Placid	64	6	4	2	12	1	1
1936 Garmisch-Partenkirchen	55	1	0	3	4	8	6
1948 St. Moritz	69	3	4	2	9	4	4
1952 Oslo	65	4	6	1	11	2	2
1956 Cortina d'Ampezzo	67	2	3	2	7	6	5
1960 Squaw Valley	79	3	4	3	10	3	2
1964 Innsbruck	89	1	2	4	7	8	8
1968 Grenoble	95	1	5	1	7	9	8
1972 Sapporo	103	3	2	3	8	5	6
1976 Innsbruck	106	3	3	4	10	3	3
1980 Lake Placid	101	6	4	2	12	3	3
1984 Sarajevo	107	4	4	0	8	3	4
1988 Calgary	118	2	1	3	6	9	9
1992 Albertville	147	5	4	2	11	5	6
1994 Lillehammer	147	6	5	2	13	5	5
1998 Nagano	186	6	3	4	13	5	6
2002 Salt Lake City	202	10	13	11	34	3	2
2006 Turin	204	9	9	7	25	2	2
2010 Vancouver	212	9	15	13	37	3	1
2014 Sochi	222	9	9	10	28	4	2
2018 Pyeongchang	241	9	8	6	23	4	4
2022 Beijing	224	9	9	7	25	3	5
2026 Milano Cortina	232	12	12	9	33	2	2
2030 French Alps	future event						
2034 Utah	future event						
Total (25/25)	3,183	126	133	104	363	2	2

=== Best results ===
==== Summer Olympics ====
- Gold medals – 83 (1984 Summer Olympics), Olympic record
- Total medals – 231 (1904 Summer Olympics), Olympic record

==== Winter Olympics ====
- Gold medals – 12 (2026 Winter Olympics)
- Total medals – 37 (2010 Winter Olympics)

=== Medals by summer sport ===
Leading in that sport

Sport	Gold	Silver	Bronze	Total
Athletics	359	282	226	867
Swimming	265	194	152	611
Wrestling	59	47	43	149
Shooting	58	34	29	121
Boxing	50	27	41	118
Diving	49	47	46	142
Gymnastics	42	45	42	129
Rowing	34	32	25	91
Basketball	27	2	3	32
Tennis	21	7	13	41
Cycling	20	24	22	66
Sailing	19	23	20	62
Weightlifting	17	17	14	48
Archery	14	11	10	35
Equestrian	11	24	20	55
Beach volleyball	7	2	2	11
Fencing	6	12	19	37
Canoeing	6	6	7	19
Golf	6	2	4	12
Artistic swimming	5	3	2	10
Football	5	2	2	9
Water polo	4	6	6	16
Volleyball	4	4	5	13
Taekwondo	3	2	6	11
Softball	3	2	0	5
Judo	2	4	8	14
Rugby	2	0	1	3
Surfing	2	0	0	2
Triathlon	1	2	2	5
Baseball	1	1	2	4
Roque	1	1	1	3
Tug of war	1	1	1	3
3x3 basketball	1	0	1	2
Jeu de paume	1	0	0	1
Modern pentathlon	0	6	3	9
Skateboarding	0	2	3	5
Sport climbing	0	2	1	3
Polo	0	1	1	2
Lacrosse	0	1	0	1
Marathon swimming	0	1	0	1
Field hockey	0	0	2	2
Breaking	0	0	1	1
Karate	0	0	1	1
Totals (43 entries)	1,106	879	787	2,772

Updated on November 16, 2024

*This table does not include two medals awarded at the 1920 Summer Olympics – one silver awarded in the ice hockey event and one bronze awarded in the figure skating event.

The United States has never won an Olympic medal in the following current summer sports or disciplines: badminton, handball, rhythmic gymnastics, table tennis and trampoline gymnastics.

=== Medals by winter sport ===
Sport	Gold	Silver	Bronze	Total
Speed skating	32	24	20	76
Alpine skiing	19	22	11	52
Figure skating	19	17	21	57
Snowboarding	17	9	11	37
Freestyle skiing	14	17	10	41
Bobsleigh	9	11	11	31
Ice hockey	6	12	2	20
Short track speed skating	4	7	10	21
Skeleton	3	4	1	8
Cross-country skiing	1	4	2	7
Nordic combined	1	3	0	4
Curling	1	1	1	3
Luge	0	3	4	7
Ski jumping	0	0	1	1
Totals (14 entries)	126	134	105	365

Updated on February 22, 2026

*This table includes two medals awarded at the 1920 Summer Olympics – one silver awarded in the ice hockey event and one bronze awarded in the figure skating event.

Biathlon and ski mountaineering are the current winter sport that the United States has never won an Olympic medal in.

=== Best results in non-medaling sports ===
Summer
Sport	Rank	Athlete(s)	Event & Year
Badminton	8th	Howard Bach; Bob Malaythong	Men's doubles in 2008
Handball	5th	United States women's team	Women's tournament in 1984
Rhythmic gymnastics	9th	Mandy James; Alaine Mata-Baquerot; Kate Nelson; Brandi Siegel; Challen Sievers; Becky Turner	Women's group in 1996
Table tennis	6th	Gao Jun; Crystal Huang; Wang Chen	Women's team in 2008
Trampoline gymnastics	6th	Savannah Vinsant	Women's individual in 2012
Trampoline gymnastics	6th	Nicole Ahsinger	Women's individual in 2020
Winter
Sport	Rank	Athlete	Event & Year
Biathlon	5th	Sean Doherty; Maxime Germain; Paul Schommer; Campbell Wright	Men's relay in 2026
Ski mountaineering	4th	Anna Gibson; Cameron Smith	Mixed relay in 2026

=== Reallocated medals of the 1900 and 1904 Summer Olympics ===
The nationalities of several medalists were disputed, as many athletes competing for American clubs or teams were recent immigrants who had not yet acquired U.S. citizenship. Following recommendations by Olympic historian Bill Mallon, the IOC adjusted its database in July 2021, attributing results by athletes nationality, and, from 2024 onward, attributed participation and medals according to the national affiliation of the club or team for which the athletes competed.

As of the IOC's 2024 revision, the following cases comprise for the 1900 Summer Olympics a total of two medals (one gold, and one silver), and for the 1904 Summer Olympics a total of 17 medals (4 gold, 7 silver, and 6 bronze) attributed to the United States, despite having been won by non-American athletes, as they represented clubs affiliated with the United States. Three of the 17 medals (1 gold, 1 silver, and 1 bronze) were won by mixed teams consisting of American clubs or teams that included non-American athletes.

Only the medals of two American athletes in the women's individual golf event at the 1900 Games have been attributed to a foreign country. American Pauline Whittier (silver) was affiliated with the St. Moritz Golf Club in Switzerland, while Abbie Pratt (bronze) was affiliated with the Dinard Golf Club in France; their medals were therefore attributed to Switzerland and France, respectively.

==== Medals reallocated from non-American athletes to American teams ====
Individual events
Medal	Name	Nationality	Affiliation	Games	Sport	Event	Reallocated to	Ref
Gold	George Orton	Canada	University of Pennsylvania	1900 Paris	Athletics	Men's 2500 metres steeplechase	United States	
Bronze	George Orton	Canada	University of Pennsylvania	1900 Paris	Athletics	Men's 400 metres hurdles	United States	
Gold	Julius Lenhart	Austria	Philadelphia Turngemeinde	1904 St. Louis	Gymnastics	Men's all-around	United States	
Gold	Bernhoff Hansen	Norway	Brooklyn Norwegier Turnverein	1904 St. Louis	Wrestling	Men's freestyle heavyweight	United States	
Gold	Charles Ericksen	Norway	Brooklyn Norwegier Turnverein	1904 St. Louis	Wrestling	Men's freestyle welterweight	United States	
Silver	Albert Corey	France	Chicago Athletic Association	1904 St. Louis	Athletics	Men's Marathon	United States	
Silver	Julius Lenhart	Austria	Philadelphia Turngemeinde	1904 St. Louis	Gymnastics	Men's triathlon	United States	
Silver	Francis Gailey	Australia	Olympic Club, San Francisco	1904 St. Louis	Swimming	Men's 220 yard freestyle	United States	
Silver	Francis Gailey	Australia	Olympic Club, San Francisco	1904 St. Louis	Swimming	Men's 440 yard freestyle	United States	
Silver	Francis Gailey	Australia	Olympic Club, San Francisco	1904 St. Louis	Swimming	Men's 880 yard freestyle	United States	
Silver	Frank Kugler	Germany	St. Louis Southwest Turnverein	1904 St. Louis	Wrestling	Men's freestyle heavyweight	United States	
Bronze	Francis Gailey	Australia	Olympic Club, San Francisco	1904 St. Louis	Swimming	Men's1 mile freestyle	United States	
Bronze	Otto Wahle	Austria	New York Athletic Club	1904 St. Louis	Swimming	Men's 440 yd freestyle	United States	
Bronze	Frank Kugler	Germany	St. Louis Southwest Turnverein	1904 St. Louis	Weightlifting	Men's two hand lift	United States	
Bronze	Frank Kugler	Germany	St. Louis Southwest Turnverein	1904 St. Louis	Weightlifting	Men's all-around dumbbell	United States	
Bronze	Gustav Tiefenthaler	Switzerland	South Broadway AC	1904 St. Louis	Wrestling	Men's freestyle light flyweight	United States	

Team events
Medal	Team	Affiliation	Games	Sport	Event	Reallocated to	Ref
Gold	Mixed team John Grieb (USA); Anton Heida (USA); Max Hess (USA); Philip Kassel (USA); Julius Lenhart (AUT); Ernst Reckeweg (USA)	Philadelphia Turngemeinde	1904 St. Louis	Gymnastics	Men's team all-around	United States	
Silver	Mixed team Albert Corey (FRA); Lacey Hearn (USA); Sidney Hatch (USA); James Lightbody (USA); Frank Verner (USA)	Chicago Athletic Association	1904 St. Louis	Athletics	Men's 4 mile team race	United States	
Bronze	Mixed team Oscar Friede (USA); Charles Harberkorn (USA); Harry Jacobs (USA); Frank Kugler (GER); Charles Thias (USA)	St. Louis Southwest; Turnverein #2	1904 St. Louis	Tug of war	Men's team competition	United States	

==== Medals reallocated from American athletes to non-American teams ====
Individual events
Medal	Name	Nationality	Affiliation	Games	Sport	Event	Reallocated to	Ref
Silver	Pauline Whittier	United States	SUI; St. Moritz Golf Club	1900 Paris	Golf	Women's individual	Switzerland	
Bronze	Abbie Pratt	United States	FRA; Dinard Golf Club	1900 Paris	Golf	Women's individual	France	

== Flagbearers ==
Summer Olympics
Games	Athlete	Sport
1908 London	Ralph Rose	Athletics
1912 Stockholm	George Bonhag	Athletics
1920 Antwerp	Pat McDonald	Athletics
1924 Paris	Pat McDonald	Athletics
1928 Amsterdam	Bud Houser	Athletics
1932 Los Angeles	Morgan Taylor	Athletics
1936 Berlin	Al Jochim	Gymnastics
1948 London	Ralph Craig	Sailing
1952 Helsinki	Norman Armitage	Fencing
1956 Melbourne	Norman Armitage	Fencing
1960 Rome	Rafer Johnson	Athletics
1964 Tokyo	Parry O'Brien	Athletics
1968 Mexico City	Janice Romary	Fencing
1972 Munich	Olga Fikotová	Athletics
1976 Montreal	Gary Hall, Sr.	Swimming
1980 Moscow	Did not participate	
1984 Los Angeles	Ed Burke	Athletics
1988 Seoul	Evelyn Ashford	Athletics
1992 Barcelona	Francie Larrieu Smith	Athletics
1996 Atlanta	Bruce Baumgartner	Wrestling
2000 Sydney	Cliff Meidl	Canoeing
2004 Athens	Dawn Staley	Basketball
2008 Beijing	Lopez Lomong	Athletics
2012 London	Mariel Zagunis	Fencing
2016 Rio de Janeiro	Michael Phelps	Swimming
2020 Tokyo	Eddy Alvarez	Baseball
2020 Tokyo	Sue Bird	Basketball
2024 Paris	LeBron James	Basketball
2024 Paris	Coco Gauff	Tennis

Winter Olympics
Games	Athlete	Sport
1924 Chamonix	Clarence Abel	Ice hockey
1928 St. Moritz	Godfrey Dewey	Cross-country skiing (team manager)
1932 Lake Placid	Billy Fiske	Bobsleigh
1936 Garmisch-Partenkirchen	Rolf Monsen	Cross-country skiing
1948 St. Moritz	Jack Heaton	Skeleton & Bobsleigh
1952 Oslo	Jim Bickford	Bobsleigh
1956 Cortina d'Ampezzo	Jim Bickford	Bobsleigh
1960 Squaw Valley	Don McDermott	Speed skating
1964 Innsbruck	Bill Disney	Speed skating
1968 Grenoble	Terry McDermott	Speed skating
1972 Sapporo	Dianne Holum	Speed skating
1976 Innsbruck	Cindy Nelson	Alpine skiing
1980 Lake Placid	Scott Hamilton	Figure skating
1984 Sarajevo	Frank Masley	Luge
1988 Calgary	Lyle Nelson	Biathlon
1992 Albertville	Bill Koch	Cross-country skiing
1994 Lillehammer	Cammy Myler	Luge
1998 Nagano	Eric Flaim	Speed Skating
2002 Salt Lake City	Amy Peterson	Short track speed skating
2006 Turin	Chris Witty	Speed skating
2010 Vancouver	Mark Grimmette	Luge
2014 Sochi	Todd Lodwick	Nordic combined
2018 Pyeongchang	Erin Hamlin	Luge
2022 Beijing	Brittany Bowe	Speed Skating
2022 Beijing	John Shuster	Curling
2026 Milano Cortina	Erin Jackson	Speed Skating
2026 Milano Cortina	Frank Del Duca	Bobsleigh

== History ==
=== Recent period (1994–present) ===
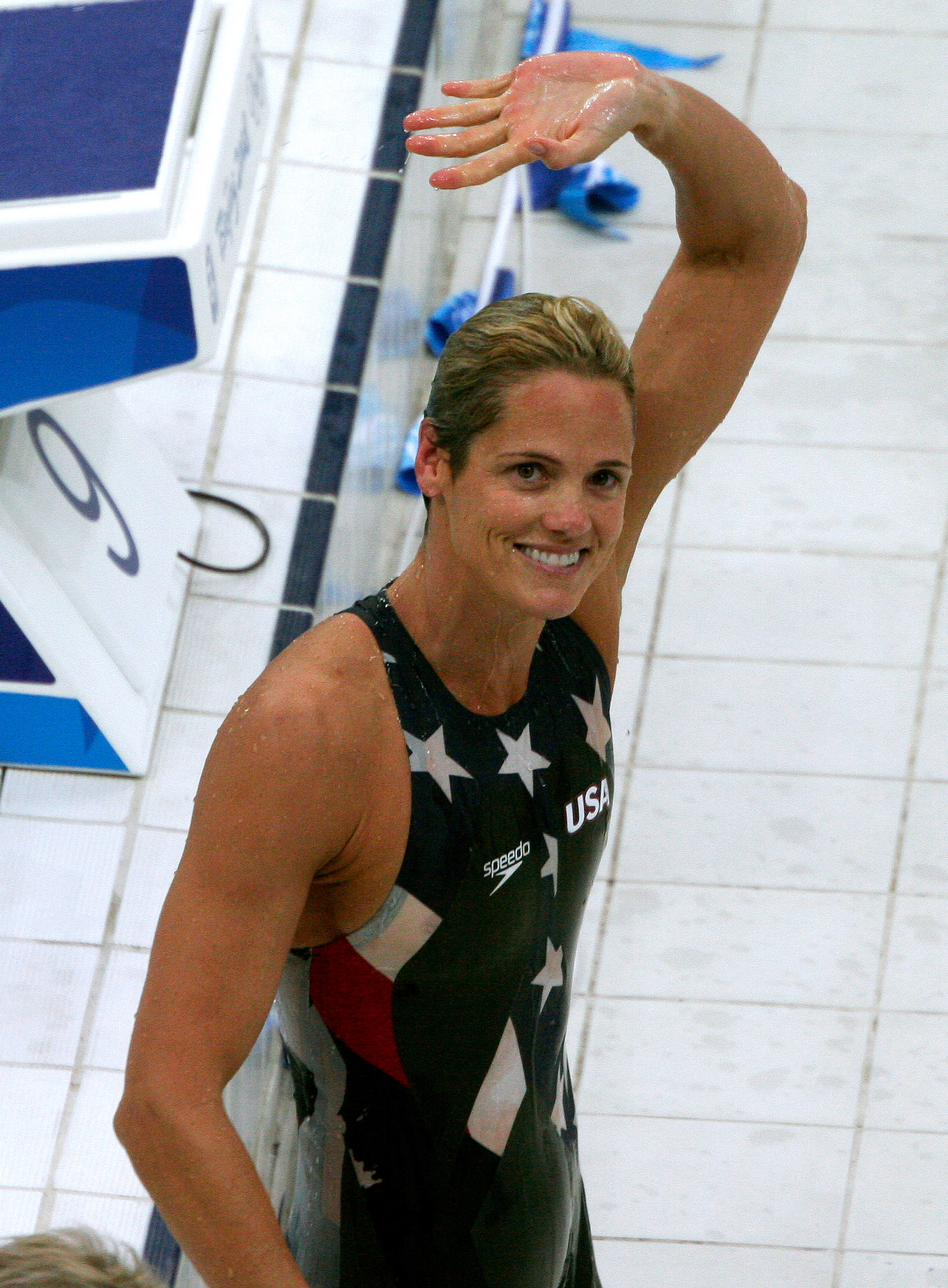
Dara Torres is the third-most decorated female American Olympic athlete after Jenny Thompson and Katie Ledecky, celebrated not only for her athletic achievements but also for defying age norms in competitive sports.

U.S. athletes have appeared in every Summer Olympic Games in recent decades, with their fortunes having steadily improved in most sports since 1992. America finished second in the medal count in 1992 and 2008, while placing first at seven other Games in that period.

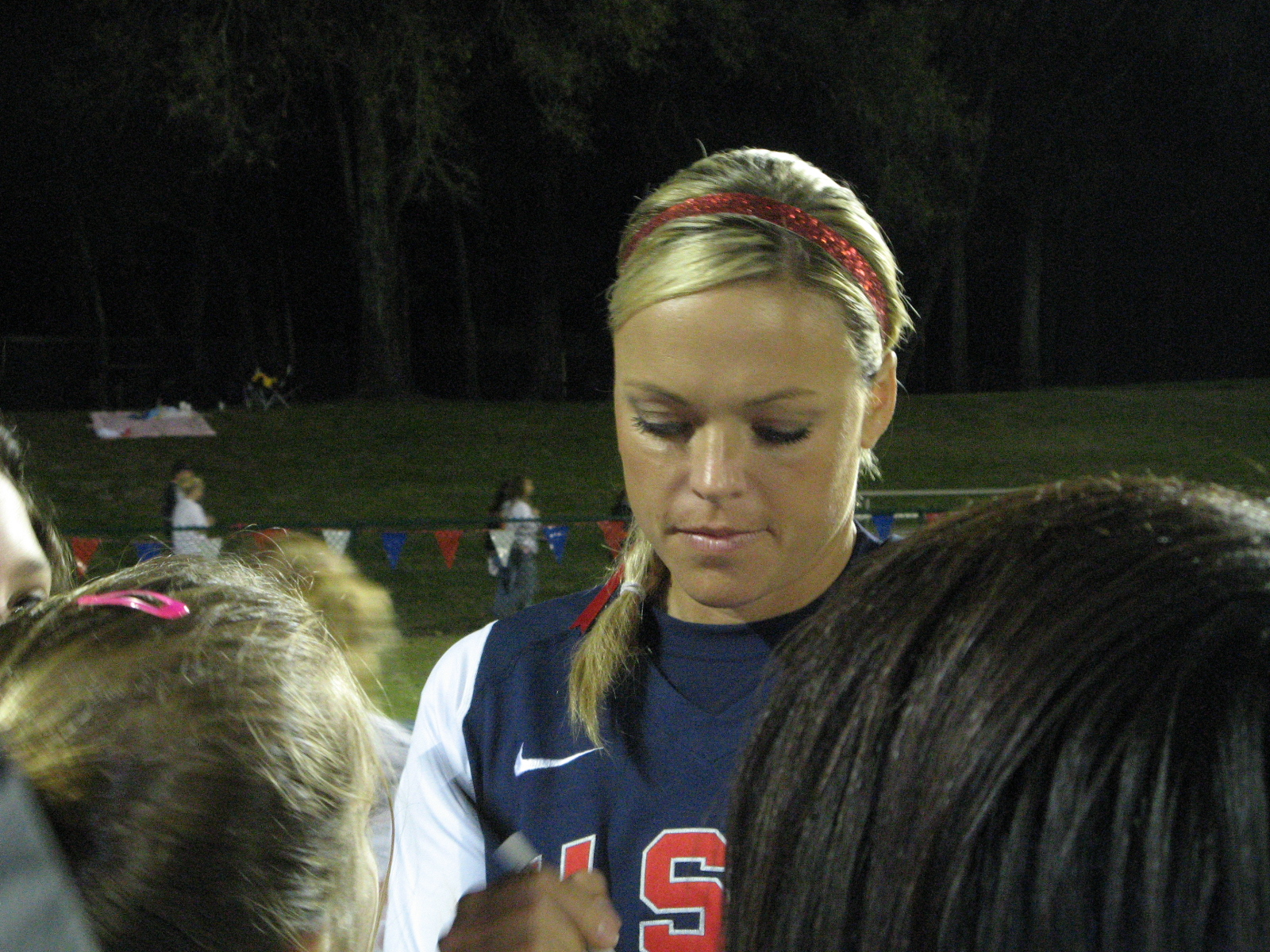
Jennie Finch signing autographs. From 1998 to 2010, Finch became the most recognizable face on a dominant U.S. softball squad. Her 2004 Olympics showing put her on an elite level, as she helped lead Team USA to a gold medal.

At the 2016 Summer Games, Kim Rhode became the only female Olympian to win an Olympic medal in six consecutive Olympic Games (1996, 2000, 2004, 2008, 2012, 2016). She has won three gold medals, one silver medal and two bronze medals.

The United States, represented by the United States Olympic & Paralympic Committee (USOPC), competed at the 2020 Summer Olympics in Tokyo. Originally scheduled to take place in the summer of 2020, the Games were postponed to July 23 to August 8, 2021, due to the COVID-19 pandemic. The opening ceremony flag-bearers for the United States were baseball player Eddy Alvarez and basketball player Sue Bird. Javelin thrower Kara Winger was the flag-bearer for the closing ceremony. When USA Gymnastics announced that 2016 Olympic all-around champion Simone Biles would not participate in the gymnastics all-around final due to health issues, the spotlight fell on her American teammates. The U.S. had won the event in each of the last five Olympic Games: a formidable winning streak was on the line. Sunisa Lee embraced the moment and stood tall to deliver for her country. She totaled 57.433 to hold off Rebeca Andrade of Brazil (57.298) to clinch the title. Lee also made history of her own. With victory in the all-around she became the first Hmong American gymnast to win an Olympic gold medal, and the first gymnast of Asian descent to do so. With a silver in the women's team final and bronze in the individual uneven bars Lee left Tokyo with an impressive three Olympic medals.

Lydia Jacoby, Alaska's teenage swimming sweetheart, made history when she became the first Alaskan swimmer selected to make the U.S. Olympic swim team. She surprised the swimming world by winning the women's 100m breaststroke. Recent major champion Nelly Korda followed the winning ways of compatriot Xander Schauffele to take home gold in the women's golf competition. The 2.01m-tall thrower Ryan Crouser retained his Olympic title in the men's shot put and did so in some style, setting an Olympic record three times. The U.S. achieved a commanding lead in the overall medal count, with 113 medals, but only edged China in the gold medal tally on the last day, finishing with 39 gold medals to China's 38.

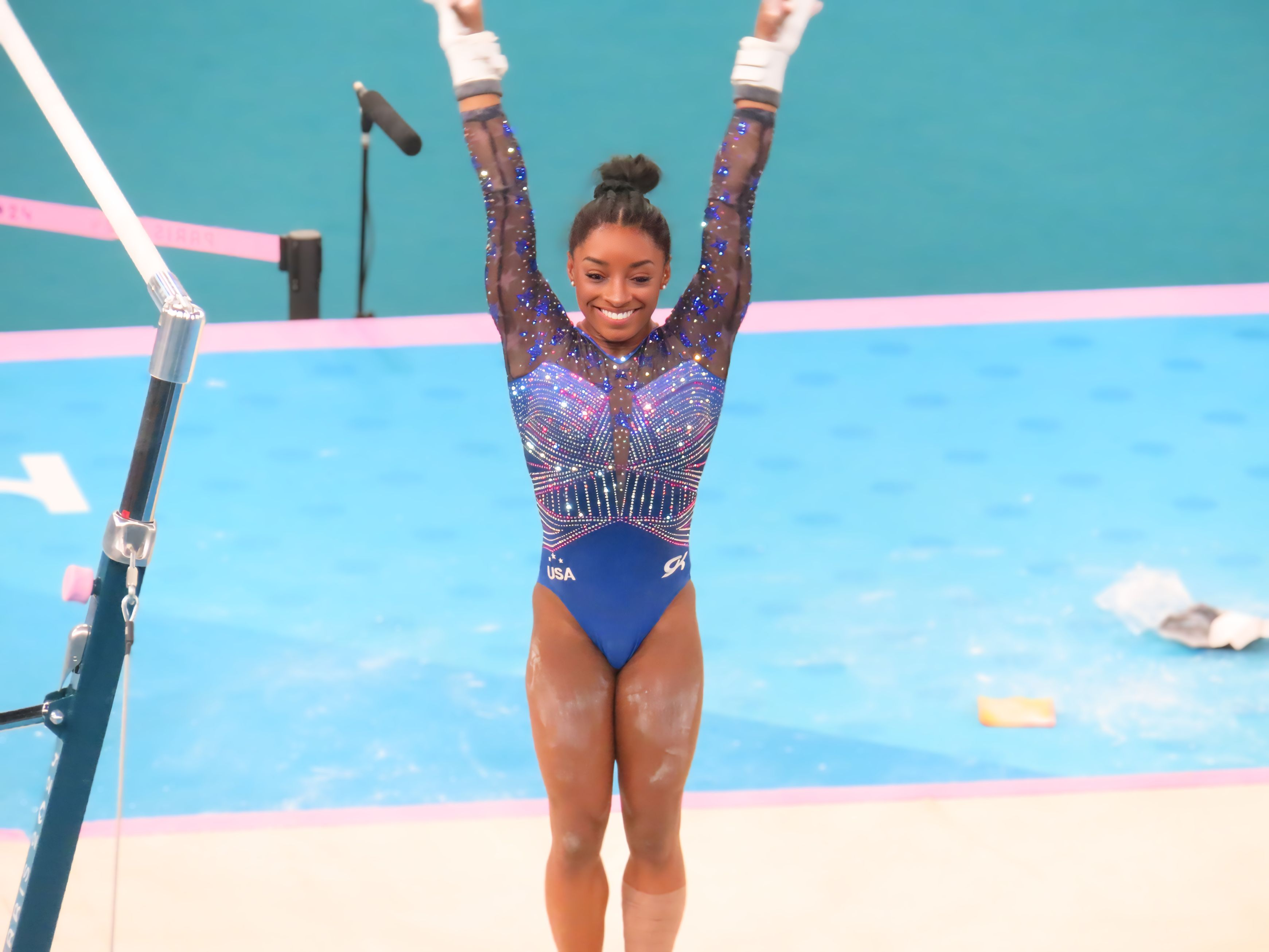
Simone Biles at the 2024 Olympic Games. Widely regarded as one of the greatest female athletes of all time, she redefined competitive gymnastics by shattering records, introducing unprecedented high-difficulty skills that bear her name, and establishing herself as the most decorated gymnast in history.

At the 2022 Winter Olympics, the U.S. exercised a diplomatic boycott due to the "ongoing genocide and crimes against humanity in Xinjiang and other human rights abuses", meaning it did not send any high-level delegation to the Games, but would not hinder athletes from participating. A total of 25 medals meant Team USA won two more medals than in 2018, although it still signifies an overall decline after 37 medals in 2010 and 28 in 2014. For the fifth consecutive games, the Americans won nine gold medals, this time placing third in the medal count. Notable successes included Jessie Diggins becoming the first American female skier to win individual cross-country medals, figure skater Nathan Chen breaking the short program world record en route to the Olympic gold medal in the men's singles, Erin Jackson becoming the first black female athlete to win speed skating gold, and Chloe Kim defending her title in the snowboarding women's halfpipe. Veteran snowboarder Lindsey Jacobellis, who last medaled in the 2006 Winter Olympics in Turin, was the only U.S. athlete with multiple gold medals, winning the women's snowboard cross event, and sharing the gold with teammate Nick Baumgartner in the mixed snowboard cross event.

== Amateurism and professionalism ==
The exclusion of professionals caused several controversies throughout the history of the modern Olympics. The 1912 Olympic pentathlon and decathlon champion Jim Thorpe was stripped of his medals, when it was discovered that he had played semi-professional baseball before the Olympics. His medals were posthumously restored by the IOC in 1983 on compassionate grounds.

The advent of the state-sponsored "full-time amateur athlete" of the Eastern Bloc countries eroded the ideology of the pure amateur. It put the self-financed amateurs of the Western countries at a disadvantage. The Soviet Union entered teams of athletes who were all nominally students, soldiers, or working in a profession, but all of whom were in reality paid by the state to train on a full-time basis. The situation greatly disadvantaged American athletes and was a major factor in the decline of American medal hauls in the 1970s and 1980s. As a result, the Olympics shifted away from amateurism, as envisioned by Pierre de Coubertin. They began allowing participation of professional athletes, but only in the 1990s, after the collapse of the Soviet Union and its influence within the International Olympic Committee.

== Prize money ==
When a U.S. athlete wins an Olympic medal, as of 2016, the USOPC paid the winner $25,000 for gold, $15,000 for silver, and $10,000 for bronze. The USOPC increased the payouts by 25% to $37,000 for gold, $22,500 for silver, and $15,000 for bronze beginning in 2017. These numbers are significantly lower than in other countries, where Olympic gold medalists receive up to $1 million from their governments for a gold medal. Since 2018, payouts to Paralympic athletes have been the same as to the Olympians. The International Paralympic Committee noted that "'Operation Gold Awards' for [American] Paralympic athletes [would] be increased by as much as 400 percent".

=== Financial support for U.S. Olympic and Paralympic athletes ===
In 2025, the United States Olympic and Paralympic Committee (USOPC) announced a historic $100 million donation from Ross Stevens, founder of Stone Ridge Holdings Group (a New York City–based asset management firm specializing in alternative investments, with over $20 billion in assets under management). The gift, the largest in the USOPC's history, provides long-term financial support for future Olympic and Paralympic athletes, addressing the financial burdens they face due to intense training schedules that limit career opportunities. Starting with the 2026 Milan Games through 2032, each participating athlete will receive $200,000 in financial benefits per Olympic appearance. The first half of this amount will be accessible 20 years after participation or upon turning 45 (whichever comes later), with the remainder given to families upon the athlete's death. The donation is intended to provide financial security and a springboard for post-Olympic careers. Many U.S. athletes face significant financial hardships due to limited national support compared to their international counterparts. Unlike many other countries, the U.S. government does not fund its Olympic program, so athletes rely almost entirely on sponsorships and media deals (which generate roughly 75–80% of revenue) plus fundraising (contributing an additional 10–20%). This funding model leaves many Olympians struggling financially during their careers—and even into retirement. In 2024, USOPF president Christine Walshe noted that 57% of U.S. athletes earn $50,000 or less annually. "You don't want athletes being destitute when they finish a long, storied career", USOPF chair Geoff Yang said, describing the donation as "transformational".

== Doping ==
United States has had eight Olympic medals stripped, which is fifth in the ranking of countries with the most stripped medals. In all cases, the sanctioned athletes acted on their own. In the case of swimmer Rick DeMont, the USOC has recognized his gold medal performance in the 1972 Summer Olympics in 2001, but only the IOC has the power to restore his medal, and it has as of 2024 refused to do so. DeMont originally won the gold medal in 4:00.26. Following the race, the IOC stripped him of his gold medal after his post-race urinalysis tested positive for traces of the banned substance ephedrine contained in his prescription asthma medication, Marax. The positive test following the 400-meter freestyle final also deprived him of a chance at multiple medals, as he was not permitted to swim in any other events at the 1972 Olympics, including the 1,500-meter freestyle for which he was the then-current world record-holder. Before the Olympics, DeMont had properly declared his asthma medications on his medical disclosure forms, but the USOC had not cleared them with the IOC's medical committee.

In 2003, Wade Exum, the United States Olympic Committee's director of drug control administration from 1991 to 2000, gave copies of documents to Sports Illustrated that revealed that some 100 American athletes failed drug tests from 1988 to 2000, arguing that they should have been prevented from competing in the Olympics but were nevertheless cleared to compete; among those athletes were Carl Lewis, Joe DeLoach and Floyd Heard. Before showing the documents to Sports Illustrated, Exum tried to use them in a lawsuit against USOC, accusing the organization of racial discrimination and wrongful termination against him and cover-up over the failed tests. His case was summarily dismissed by the Denver federal Court for lack of evidence. The USOC claimed his case "baseless" as he himself was the one in charge of screening the anti-doping test program of the organization and clarifying that the athletes were cleared according to the rules.

Carl Lewis broke his silence on allegations that he was the beneficiary of a drugs cover-up, admitting he had failed tests for banned substances, but claiming he was just one of "hundreds" of American athletes who were allowed to escape bans, concealed by the USOC. Lewis has acknowledged that he failed three tests during the 1988 US Olympic trials, which under international rules at the time should have prevented him from competing in the 1988 Summer Olympics. Former athletes and officials came out against the USOC cover-up. "For so many years I lived it. I knew this was going on, but there's absolutely nothing you can do as an athlete. You have to believe governing bodies are doing what they are supposed to do. And it is obvious they did not", said former American sprinter and 1984 Olympic champion, Evelyn Ashford.

Exum's documents revealed that Carl Lewis had tested positive three times at the 1988 Olympics trials for minimum amounts of pseudoephedrine, ephedrine, and phenylpropanolamine, which were banned stimulants. Bronchodilators are also found in cold medication. Due to the rules, his case could have led to disqualification from the Seoul Olympics and suspension from competition for six months. The levels of the combined stimulants registered in the separate tests were 2 ppm, 4 ppm and 6 ppm. Lewis defended himself, claiming that he had accidentally consumed the banned substances. After the supplements that he had taken were analyzed to prove his claims, the USOC accepted his claim of inadvertent use, since a dietary supplement he ingested was found to contain "Ma Huang", the Chinese name for Ephedra (ephedrine is known to help weight loss). Fellow Santa Monica Track Club teammates Joe DeLoach and Floyd Heard were also found to have the same banned stimulants in their systems, and were cleared to compete for the same reason. The highest level of the stimulants Lewis recorded was 6 ppm, which was regarded as a positive test in 1988 but is now regarded as negative test. The acceptable level has been raised to ten parts per million for ephedrine and twenty-five parts per million for other substances. According to the IOC rules at the time, positive tests with levels lower than 10 ppm were cause of further investigation but not immediate ban. Neal Benowitz, a professor of medicine at UC San Francisco who is an expert on ephedrine and other stimulants, agreed that "These [levels] are what you'd see from someone taking cold or allergy medicines and are unlikely to have any effect on performance." Following Exum's revelations the IAAF acknowledged that at the 1988 Olympic Trials the USOC indeed followed the correct procedures in dealing with eight positive findings for ephedrine and ephedrine-related compounds in low concentration. Additionally, in 1988 the federation reviewed the relevant documents with the athletes' names undisclosed and stated that "the medical committee felt satisfied, however, on the basis of the information received that the cases had been properly concluded by the USOC as 'negative cases' in accordance with the rules and regulations in place at the time and no further action was taken".

=== Disqualified medalists ===
- 1972 Summer Olympics, Rick DeMont – first place, gold medalist, Swimming, Men's 400 m freestyle
- 2000 Summer Olympics, Marion Jones – first place, gold medalist, Athletics, Women's 100 m
- 2000 Summer Olympics, Marion Jones – first place, gold medalist, Athletics, Women's 200 m
- 2000 Summer Olympics, Marion Jones – third place, bronze medalist, Athletics, Women's long jump
- 2000 Summer Olympics, Relay team (Antonio Pettigrew, Jerome Young) – first place, gold medalists, Athletics, Men's 4 × 400 m relay
- 2000 Summer Olympics, Lance Armstrong – third place, bronze medalist, Cycling, Men's road time trial
- 2004 Summer Olympics, Tyler Hamilton – first place, gold medalist, Cycling, Men's road time trial
- 2012 Summer Olympics, Relay team (Tyson Gay) – second place, silver medalist, Athletics, Men's 4 × 100 m relay

== See also ==
- List of United States Olympic medalists
- United States at the Paralympics
- United States at the Summer Olympics
- United States at the Winter Olympics
- United States at the Pan American Games
- Four territories of the United States send independent Olympic teams (American Samoa, Guam, Puerto Rico, and the United States Virgin Islands)
