= 200 metre freestyle at the Olympics =

Olympic sport

200 metre freestyle at the Olympic Games
- Swimming pictogram

Overview
- Sport: Swimming
- Gender: Men and women
- Years held: Men: 1900, 1904, 1968–2024; Women: 1968–2024

Reigning champion
- Men: David Popovici (ROM)
- Women: Mollie O'Callaghan (AUS)

The 200 metre freestyle event is an event held at the Summer Olympic Games. The men's event was introduced in 1900, held a second time in 1904 (at 220 yards rather than 200 metres), then was not held again until 1968. When the event returned in 1968, both men's and women's events were held. The event has remained on the programme for every Summer Olympics since.

== Medals ==
=== Men's medals ===
Games	Gold	Silver	Bronze
1896 Athens	Not held		
1900 Paris	Frederick Lane; Australia	Zoltán Halmay; Hungary	Karl Ruberl; Austria
1904 St. Louis (220 yd)	Charles Daniels; United States	Francis Gailey; Australia	Emil Rausch; Germany
1908 London	Not held		
1912 Stockholm	Not held		
1920 Antwerp	Not held		
1924 Paris	Not held		
1928 Amsterdam	Not held		
1932 Los Angeles	Not held		
1936 Berlin	Not held		
1948 London	Not held		
1952 Helsinki	Not held		
1956 Melbourne	Not held		
1960 Rome	Not held		
1964 Tokyo	Not held		
1968 Mexico City	Mike Wenden; Australia	Don Schollander; United States	John Nelson; United States
1972 Munich	Mark Spitz; United States	Steve Genter; United States	Werner Lampe; West Germany
1976 Montreal	Bruce Furniss; United States	John Naber; United States	Jim Montgomery; United States
1980 Moscow	Sergey Koplyakov; Soviet Union	Andrey Krylov; Soviet Union	Graeme Brewer; Australia
1984 Los Angeles	Michael Gross; West Germany	Mike Heath; United States	Thomas Fahrner; West Germany
1988 Seoul	Duncan Armstrong; Australia	Anders Holmertz; Sweden	Matt Biondi; United States
1992 Barcelona	Yevgeny Sadovyi; Unified Team	Anders Holmertz; Sweden	Antti Kasvio; Finland
1996 Atlanta	Danyon Loader; New Zealand	Gustavo Borges; Brazil	Daniel Kowalski; Australia
2000 Sydney	Pieter van den Hoogenband; Netherlands	Ian Thorpe; Australia	Massimiliano Rosolino; Italy
2004 Athens	Ian Thorpe; Australia	Pieter van den Hoogenband; Netherlands	Michael Phelps; United States
2008 Beijing	Michael Phelps; United States	Park Tae-Hwan; South Korea	Peter Vanderkaay; United States
2012 London	Yannick Agnel; France	Sun Yang; China Park Tae-Hwan; South Korea	None awarded
2016 Rio de Janeiro	Sun Yang; China	Chad le Clos; South Africa	Conor Dwyer; United States
2020 Tokyo	Thomas Dean; Great Britain	Duncan Scott; Great Britain	Fernando Scheffer; Brazil
2024 Paris	David Popovici; Romania	Matt Richards; Great Britain	Luke Hobson; United States

==== Men's multiple medalists ====
Rank	Swimmer	Nation	Olympics	Gold	Silver	Bronze	Total
1	Pieter van den Hoogenband	Netherlands	2000–2004	1	1	0	2
1	Ian Thorpe	Australia	2000–2004	1	1	0	2
1	Sun Yang	China	2012–2016	1	1	0	2
4	Michael Phelps	United States	2004–2008	1	0	1	2
5	Anders Holmertz	Sweden	1988–1992	0	2	0	2
5	Park Tae-Hwan	South Korea	2008–2012	0	2	0	2

==== Men's medalists by nation ====
Rank	Nation	Gold	Silver	Bronze	Total
1	United States	4	4	7	15
2	Australia	4	2	2	8
3	Great Britain	1	2	0	3
4	China	1	1	0	2
4	Netherlands	1	1	0	2
4	Soviet Union	1	1	0	2
7	West Germany	1	0	2	3
8	France	1	0	0	1
8	New Zealand	1	0	0	1
8	Unified Team	1	0	0	1
8	Romania	1	0	0	1
11	South Korea	0	2	0	2
11	Sweden	0	2	0	2
13	Brazil	0	1	1	2
14	Hungary	0	1	0	1
14	South Africa	0	1	0	1
16	Austria	0	0	1	1
16	Finland	0	0	1	1
16	Germany	0	0	1	1
16	Italy	0	0	1	1

=== Women's medals ===
Games	Gold	Silver	Bronze
1968 Mexico City	Debbie Meyer; United States	Jan Henne; United States	Jane Barkman; United States
1972 Munich	Shane Gould; Australia	Shirley Babashoff; United States	Keena Rothhammer; United States
1976 Montreal	Kornelia Ender; East Germany	Shirley Babashoff; United States	Enith Brigitha; Netherlands
1980 Moscow	Barbara Krause; East Germany	Ines Diers; East Germany	Carmela Schmidt; East Germany
1984 Los Angeles	Mary Wayte; United States	Cynthia Woodhead; United States	Annemarie Verstappen; Netherlands
1988 Seoul	Heike Friedrich; East Germany	Silvia Poll; Costa Rica	Manuela Stellmach; East Germany
1992 Barcelona	Nicole Haislett; United States	Franziska van Almsick; Germany	Kerstin Kielgaß; Germany
1996 Atlanta	Claudia Poll; Costa Rica	Franziska van Almsick; Germany	Dagmar Hase; Germany
2000 Sydney	Susie O'Neill; Australia	Martina Moravcová; Slovakia	Claudia Poll; Costa Rica
2004 Athens	Camelia Potec; Romania	Federica Pellegrini; Italy	Solenne Figuès; France
2008 Beijing	Federica Pellegrini; Italy	Sara Isakovič; Slovenia	Pang Jiaying; China
2012 London	Allison Schmitt; United States	Camille Muffat; France	Bronte Barratt; Australia
2016 Rio de Janeiro	Katie Ledecky; United States	Sarah Sjöström; Sweden	Emma McKeon; Australia
2020 Tokyo	Ariarne Titmus; Australia	Siobhán Haughey; Hong Kong	Penny Oleksiak; Canada
2024 Paris	Mollie O'Callaghan; Australia	Ariarne Titmus; Australia	Siobhán Haughey; Hong Kong

==== Women's multiple medalists ====
Rank	Swimmer	Nation	Olympics	Gold	Silver	Bronze	Total
1	Federica Pellegrini	Italy	2004–2008	1	1	0	2
1	Ariarne Titmus	Australia	2020–2024	1	1	0	2
3	Claudia Poll	Costa Rica	1996–2000	1	0	1	2
4	Shirley Babashoff	United States	1972–1976	0	2	0	2
4	Franziska van Almsick	Germany	1992–1996	0	2	0	2
6	Siobhán Haughey	Hong Kong	2020–2024	0	1	1	2

==== Women's medalists by nation ====
Rank	Nation	Gold	Silver	Bronze	Total
1	United States	5	4	2	11
2	Australia	4	1	2	7
3	East Germany	3	1	2	6
4	Costa Rica	1	1	1	3
5	Italy	1	1	0	2
6	Romania	1	0	0	1
7	Germany	0	2	2	4
8	France	0	1	1	2
8	Hong Kong	0	1	1	2
10	Slovakia	0	1	0	1
10	Slovenia	0	1	0	1
10	Sweden	0	1	0	1
13	Netherlands	0	0	2	2
14	Canada	0	0	1	1
14	China	0	0	1	1
