= 1904 Summer Olympics medal table =

1904 Summer Olympics medals
- Location: St. Louis, United States

Highlights
- Most gold medals: United States (80)
- Most total medals: United States (248)
- Medalling NOCs: 8

World map showing the medal achievements of each country during the 1904 Summer Olympics Legend: represents countries that won at least one gold medal. represents countries that won at least one silver medal but no gold medals. represents countries that won at least one bronze medal (no gold or silver). represents participating countries that did not win medals. represents entities that did not participate at the 1904 Summer Olympics.

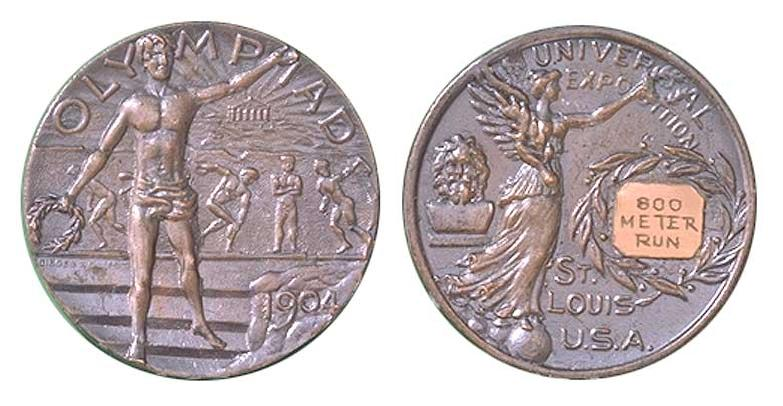
The silver medal awarded for the 800m run during the 1904 Summer Olympics

The 1904 Summer Olympics were held in St. Louis, Missouri, United States from July 1 to November 23, 1904, as part of the St. Louis World's Fair.

A total of 651 athletes from 12 nations participated in 95 events in 16 sports at these games.

Nine participating nations earned medals, in addition to four medals won by mixed teams. In the early Olympic Games, several team events were contested by athletes from multiple nations. Retroactively, the IOC created the designation "mixed team" (with the country code ZZX) to refer to these groups of athletes. Some athletes won medals both individually and as part of a mixed team, so these medals are tabulated under different nations in the official counts.

The United States won 248 medals, setting a record that still stands today. The Soviet Union came closest to beating the record with 195 medals at the 1980 Summer Olympics and currently is in second place. The Soviets briefly shared the record for gold medals with the Americans, matching the USA's 80 gold medals from 1904 with their own result at the 1980 Olympic Games. However, the United States subsequently won 83 gold medals in the 1984 Summer Olympics, setting another all-time record. Gold medals were awarded to event winners for the first time at the 1904 games. Prior to that, a silver medal was awarded to first-place finishers and a bronze medal to second-place finishers.

== Medal table ==
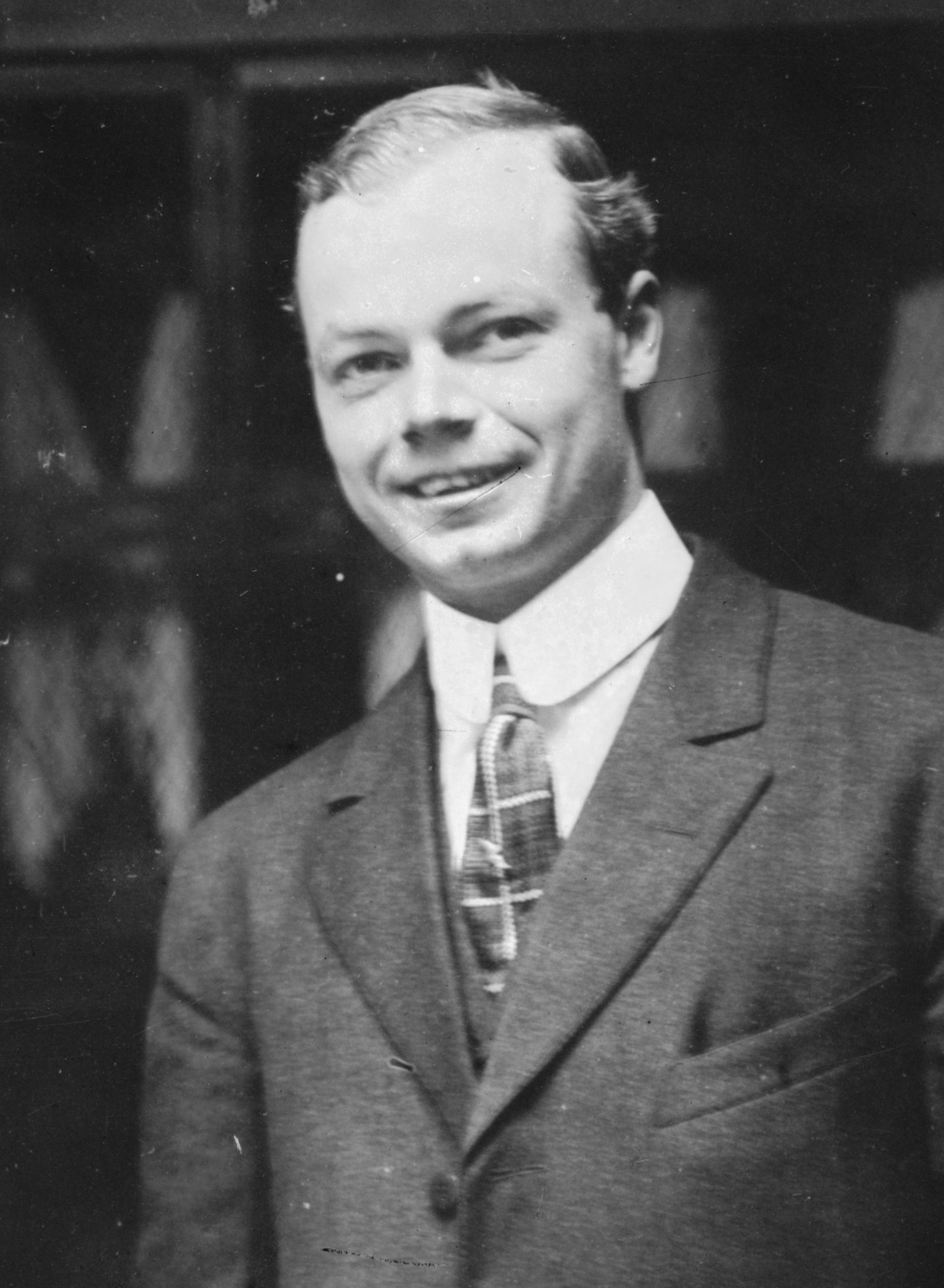
Charles Daniels won three gold, one silver, and one bronze medal in swimming for the United States during the 1904 games.

The medal table is based on information provided by the International Olympic Committee (IOC) and is consistent with IOC conventional sorting in its published medal tables. The table uses the Olympic medal table sorting method. By default, the table is ordered by the number of gold medals the athletes from a nation have won, where a nation is an entity represented by a NOC. The number of silver medals is taken into consideration next and then the number of bronze medals. If teams are still tied, equal ranking is given and they are listed alphabetically by their IOC country code.

* Host nation (United States)

1904 Summer Olympics medal table (Note: Figures in table reflect all official changes in medal standings.)
| Rank | Nation | Gold | Silver | Bronze | Total |
|---|---|---|---|---|---|
| 1 | United States* | 80 | 85 | 83 | 248 |
| 2 | Germany | 5 | 4 | 5 | 14 |
| 3 | Canada | 4 | 1 | 1 | 6 |
| 4 | Cuba | 3 | 0 | 0 | 3 |
| 5 | Hungary | 2 | 1 | 1 | 4 |
| 6 | Great Britain | 1 | 1 | 0 | 2 |
| 7 | Greece | 1 | 0 | 1 | 2 |
| 8 | Mixed team | 1 | 0 | 0 | 1 |
| Totals (8 entries) | | 97 | 92 | 91 | 280 |

== Changes in medal standings ==
=== Stripped Olympic medals ===
Key

※ Disqualified athlete(s)

List of official changes in medal standings
| Ruling date | Sport/Event | Athlete (NOC) | 1st place, gold medalist(s) | 2nd place, silver medalist(s) | 3rd place, bronze medalist(s) | Total | Notes |
|---|---|---|---|---|---|---|---|
| November 1905 | Boxing; Lightweight | Jack Egan (USA) ※ | | −1 | | −1 | Jack Egan won two Olympic medals in boxing, a silver medal in the lightweight category, losing to Harry Spanjer in the final, and a tied bronze medal in the welterweight category against fellow American boxer, Joseph Lydon. By the rules of the AAU it was illegal to fight under an assumed name. (Egan's actual name was Frank Joseph Floyd.) In November 1905, the AAU disqualified Egan from all AAU competitions and he had to return all his prizes including his two Olympics medals. |
| November 1905 | Boxing; Lightweight | Russell van Horn (USA) | | +1 | −1 | 0 | Jack Egan won two Olympic medals in boxing, a silver medal in the lightweight category, losing to Harry Spanjer in the final, and a tied bronze medal in the welterweight category against fellow American boxer, Joseph Lydon. By the rules of the AAU it was illegal to fight under an assumed name. (Egan's actual name was Frank Joseph Floyd.) In November 1905, the AAU disqualified Egan from all AAU competitions and he had to return all his prizes including his two Olympics medals. |
| November 1905 | Boxing; Lightweight | Peter Sturholdt (USA) | | | +1 | +1 | Jack Egan won two Olympic medals in boxing, a silver medal in the lightweight category, losing to Harry Spanjer in the final, and a tied bronze medal in the welterweight category against fellow American boxer, Joseph Lydon. By the rules of the AAU it was illegal to fight under an assumed name. (Egan's actual name was Frank Joseph Floyd.) In November 1905, the AAU disqualified Egan from all AAU competitions and he had to return all his prizes including his two Olympics medals. |
| November 1905 | Boxing; Welterweight | Jack Egan (USA) ※ | | | −1 | −1 | Jack Egan won two Olympic medals in boxing, a silver medal in the lightweight category, losing to Harry Spanjer in the final, and a tied bronze medal in the welterweight category against fellow American boxer, Joseph Lydon. By the rules of the AAU it was illegal to fight under an assumed name. (Egan's actual name was Frank Joseph Floyd.) In November 1905, the AAU disqualified Egan from all AAU competitions and he had to return all his prizes including his two Olympics medals. |
| November 1905 | Boxing; Welterweight | Joseph Lydon (USA) | | | +1 | +1 | Jack Egan won two Olympic medals in boxing, a silver medal in the lightweight category, losing to Harry Spanjer in the final, and a tied bronze medal in the welterweight category against fellow American boxer, Joseph Lydon. By the rules of the AAU it was illegal to fight under an assumed name. (Egan's actual name was Frank Joseph Floyd.) In November 1905, the AAU disqualified Egan from all AAU competitions and he had to return all his prizes including his two Olympics medals. |

=== Reallocation of Olympic medals to club affiliation ===
==== IOC attribution policy ====
From the 1896 to 1904 Olympic Games, athletes were not always entered by nationality. While many competed under their National Olympic Committees (NOCs), others were entered by clubs, particularly in team events. In such cases, participation and medals could be attributed to the country of the club rather than the athlete's nationality. Consequently,The International Olympic Committee (IOC) has applied an inconsistent approach for attributing participation and medals from the 1896–1904 Olympic Games over time, alternating between the athlete's nationality and the national affiliation of the club they represented.

- Team events: Until 2024, the IOC classified all teams composed of athletes from different countries in the early Modern Olympic Games as mixed teams (IOC code ZZX), regardless of whether they represented an established club. Since 2024, teams representing a club have been attributed to the club's country, even if they included foreign athletes. Only ad hoc teams formed solely for the Olympic Games are now classified as mixed teams.
- Individual events: From 2021 to 2024, the IOC attributed medals in individual events according to the athlete's nationality, even when the athlete represented a foreign club. Since 2024, participation and medals have instead been attributed according to the national affiliation of the club represented by the athlete, largely restoring the attribution policy that had been applied for these Games prior to 2021.

A total of 19 medals from the 1904 Olympic Games, 16 in individual and 3 in team events, have been reallocated by the IOC since 2024. These medals have only been reallocated to two countries, 17 to the United States and 2 to Germany.

Redistribution of medals in 2024
| NOC | Gold | Silver | Bronze | Net Change |
|---|---|---|---|---|
| United States | +4 | +7 | +6 | +17 |
| Germany | +1 | −1 | −1 | −1 |
| France^{†} | 0 | −1 | 0 | −1 |
| Norway^{†} | −2 | 0 | 0 | −2 |
| Austria^{†} | −1 | −1 | −1 | −3 |
| Mixed team | −1 | −1 | −1 | −3 |
| Switzerland^{†} | −1 | 0 | −2 | −3 |
| Australia^{†} | 0 | −3 | −1 | −4 |

^{†} As a result of the reallocation, five countries — Australia, Austria, France, Norway, and Switzerland — are no longer represented in the official medal table of the 1904 Olympic Games.

==== Individual events ====
The below table list only the medalists, whose medals were reclassified in 2024 by the IOC.

Denotes medal assigned by IOC to the athlete's registered NOC (club affiliation)

| Medal | Sport/Event | Athlete (Nationality) | NOC affiliation of club | Pre-2024 reallocation | Post-2024 reallocation | Note |
|---|---|---|---|---|---|---|
| Gold | Wrestling; Freestyle heavyweight | Bernhoff Hansen (NOR) | United States (USA); Brooklyn Norwegier Turnverein | NOR | USA | (Note: The International Olympic Committee originally considered Norwegian-American wrestlers Charles Ericksen and Bernhoff Hansen to have competed for the United States (both were Norwegian immigrants to the US); each won a gold medal. In 2012, Norwegian historians however found documentation showing that Ericksen did not receive American citizenship until March 22, 1905, and that Hansen, who was registered as an "alien" (foreigner) as late as 1925, probably never received American citizenship. The historians have therefore petitioned to have the athletes registered as Norwegian. In May 2013, it was reported that the Norwegian Olympic Committee had filed a formal application for changing the nationality of the wrestlers in IOC's medal database. In July 2021, the IOC modified data in the official database, recognizing Ericksen and Hansen as having competed for Norway. Since 2024, the IOC has considered the National Olympic Committee (NOC) affiliation of the team for which an athlete competed to be the decisive factor for the first three Olympic Games (1896–1904), attributing participation and medals accordingly.) |
| Gold | Wrestling; Freestyle welterweight | Charles Ericksen (NOR) | United States (USA); Brooklyn Norwegier Turnverein | NOR | USA | |
| Gold | Gymnastics; All-around | Julius Lenhart (AUT) | United States (USA); Philadelphia Turngemeinde | AUT | USA | (Note: Representing the Philadelphia Turngemeinde at the 1904 Summer Olympics in St. Louis, Lenhart won the gold medal in the individual all-around and the silver medal in triathlon at the gymnastics events. In addition, he also led the 'Philadelphia Turngemeinde' team to victory in the team all-around competition, earning his second gold medal.) |
| Silver | Gymnastics; Triathlon | Julius Lenhart (AUT) | United States (USA); Philadelphia Turngemeinde | AUT | USA | (Note: Representing the Philadelphia Turngemeinde at the 1904 Summer Olympics in St. Louis, Lenhart won the gold medal in the individual all-around and the silver medal in triathlon at the gymnastics events. In addition, he also led the 'Philadelphia Turngemeinde' team to victory in the team all-around competition, earning his second gold medal.) |
| Gold | Gymnastics; Triathlon | Adolf Spinnler (SUI) | Germany (GER); Turnverein Esslingen | SUI | GER | (Note: Born in Liestal, Switzerland, he represented the German gymnastics club 'Turnverein Esslingen' at the 1904 Olympic Games. Although Swiss by nationality, the official entry lists identified him as competing for Germany. Spinnler won two medals in gymnastics, gold in the triathlon event and bronze in the individual all-around event.) |
| Bronze | Gymnastics; All-around | Adolf Spinnler (SUI) | Germany (GER); Turnverein Esslingen | SUI | GER | (Note: Born in Liestal, Switzerland, he represented the German gymnastics club 'Turnverein Esslingen' at the 1904 Olympic Games. Although Swiss by nationality, the official entry lists identified him as competing for Germany. Spinnler won two medals in gymnastics, gold in the triathlon event and bronze in the individual all-around event.) |
| Silver | Athletics; Marathon | Albert Corey (FRA) | United States (USA); Chicago Athletic Association | FRA | USA | (Note: The Games report refers to Corey as a "Frenchman wearing the colors of the Chicago Athletic Association". Corey was a French immigrant to the United States, who lived in the United States and did not have the right papers. The International Olympic Committee attributes his medals in the marathon and the four mile team race to the United States.) |
| Silver | Swimming; 220 yard freestyle | Francis Gailey (AUS) | United States (USA); Olympic Club, San Francisco | AUS | USA | (Note: For many years, it was believed that either one or two Australians had competed at the Games, with neither winning medals. However, in 2009, it came to light that swimmer Frank Gailey; born in Brisbane, Queensland, Australia; who later immigrated to the United States and became a U.S. citizen, had not yet done so when he competed at the Games, and the main reason he was wrongly identified as an American at the time was because he had joined the San Francisco Olympic club. Gailey won three silver medals and one bronze medal. The IOC counts Gailey's four medals for the United States) |
| Silver | Swimming; 440 yard freestyle | Francis Gailey (AUS) | United States (USA); Olympic Club, San Francisco | AUS | USA | |
| Silver | Swimming; 880 yard freestyle | Francis Gailey (AUS) | United States (USA); Olympic Club, San Francisco | AUS | USA | |
| Bronze | Swimming; 1 mile freestyle | Francis Gailey (AUS) | United States (USA); Olympic Club, San Francisco | AUS | USA | |
| Silver | Wrestling; Freestyle heavyweight | Frank Kugler (GER) | United States (USA); St. Louis Southwest Turnverein | GER | USA | (Note: The IOC listed German-American Franz Kugler as a member of the U.S. delegation from the beginning, when it assigned the medals he had won at the 1904 St. Louis Olympics to the United States.) |
| Bronze | Weightlifting; Two hand lift | Frank Kugler (GER) | United States (USA); St. Louis Southwest Turnverein | GER | USA | (Note: The IOC listed German-American Franz Kugler as a member of the U.S. delegation from the beginning, when it assigned the medals he had won at the 1904 St. Louis Olympics to the United States.) |
| Bronze | Weightlifting; All-around dumbbell | Frank Kugler (GER) | United States (USA); St. Louis Southwest Turnverein | GER | USA | (Note: The IOC listed German-American Franz Kugler as a member of the U.S. delegation from the beginning, when it assigned the medals he had won at the 1904 St. Louis Olympics to the United States.) |
| Bronze | Swimming; 440 yd freestyle | Otto Wahle (AUT) | United States (USA); New York Athletic Club | AUT | USA | (Note: Otto Wahle was an Austrian national until 1906 when he became a US citizen, after settling in New York. He competed for Austria at both the 1900 and 1904 Olympics, while being affiliated with the New York Athletic Club at the latter Games. However, unlike in 1900, his bronze medal from 1904 is attributed to the United States because he competed for an American sports club.) |
| Bronze | Wrestling; Freestyle light flyweight | Gustav Tiefenthaler (SUI) | United States (USA); South Broadway AC | SUI | USA | (Note: Gustav Tiefenthaler was born in Switzerland but the family moved to the United States when he was young. Tiefenthaler was still a Swiss citizen in 1904, but he represented the South Broadway Athletic Club in St. Louis, an American club.) |

==== Team events ====
The below table list only the teams, whose medals were reclassified in 2024 by the IOC.

Denotes medal assigned by IOC to the team's registered NOC (club affiliation)

| Medal | Sport/Event | Team (Nationality) | NOC affiliation of club/team | Pre-2024 reallocation | Post-2024 reallocation | Note |
|---|---|---|---|---|---|---|
| Gold | Gymnastics; Team all-around | Mixed team John Grieb (USA); Anton Heida (USA); Max Hess (USA); Philip Kassel (USA); Julius Lenhart (AUT); Ernst Reckeweg (USA) | United States (USA); Philadelphia Turngemeinde | ZZX | USA | (Note: There were 13 teams entered in this all-around team event, with gymnasts from three nations, although all teams were from American turnvereins (gymnastics clubs). The teams represented 10 American cities, including two teams from St. Louis and three from Chicago. Each team consisted of six gymnasts, with their scores from the individual all-around event, with adjustments made due to predetermined maximum scores for each discipline. The gold medal was won by the Philadelphia Turngemeinde, led by Austrian gymnast Julius Lenhart, who had also won the individual all-around competition. Lenhart had only lived in Philadelphia for a few years before returning to Austria. Germany also attempted to enter a team, but its entry was rejected because the German gymnasts were not members of the same club.) |
| Silver | Athletics; 4 mile team race | Mixed team Albert Corey (FRA); Lacey Hearn (USA); Sidney Hatch (USA); James Lightbody (USA); Frank Verner (USA) | United States (USA); Chicago Athletic Association | ZZX | USA | |
| Bronze | Tug of War; Team competition | Mixed team Oscar Friede (USA); Charles Harberkorn (USA); Harry Jacobs (USA); Frank Kugler (GER); Charles Thias (USA) | United States (USA); St. Louis Southwest Turnverein #2 | ZZX | USA | |
