= Swimming at the 1904 Summer Olympics – Men's 100 yard freestyle =

Men's 100 yard freestyle at the Games of the III Olympiad
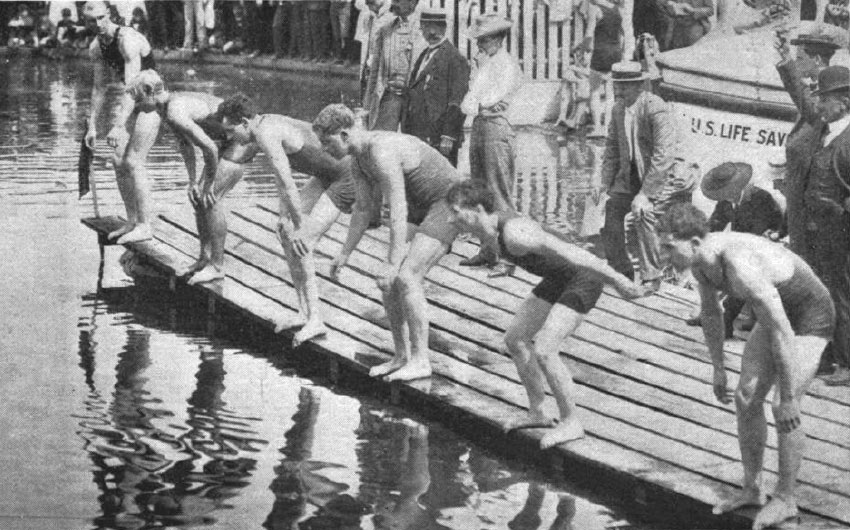
- Start of 100 yards final
- Venue: Forest Park
- Date: September 5
- Competitors: 9 from 2 nations
- Winning time: 1:02.8 OR

Medalists
1st place, gold medalist(s)		Zoltán Halmay; Hungary
2nd place, silver medalist(s)		Charles Daniels; United States
3rd place, bronze medalist(s)		Scott Leary; United States

The men's 100 yard freestyle was a swimming event held as part of the Swimming at the 1904 Summer Olympics programme. It was the second time the event was held at the Olympics, though the only time yards were used instead of metres. 9 swimmers from 2 nations competed. The event was won by Zoltán Halmay of Hungary, the nation's second consecutive victory in the 100 yard/metre freestyle.

== Background ==
This was the second appearance of the men's 100 freestyle, with the distance in yards for the only time. The event has been held at every Summer Olympics except 1900 (when the shortest freestyle was the 200 metres), though the 1904 version was measured in yards rather than metres.

None of the swimmers from 1896 returned.

Both competing nations, Hungary and the United States, were making their second appearance in the event; no nations made their debut in 1904.

== Competition format ==
The competition featured two rounds, heats and a final. The swimmers were grouped into two heats, with the top 3 in each heat (regardless of overall time) advancing to the final.

The swimming races were held in a man-made lake in the park, between a pier and some floating rafts. There was a slight current, which apparently did not greatly affect the swimmers.

== Records ==
Prior to this competition, there was no recognized world record (first recognized in 1905) and the Olympic record was in metres.

100 metres
World record				
Olympic record	Alfréd Hajós (HUN)	1:22.2	Athens, Greece	11 April 1896

Zoltán Halmay broke the Olympic in the first semifinal and then bettered his new record in the final.

== Schedule ==
Date	Time	Round
Monday, 5 September 1904		Semifinals; Final

== Results ==
=== Semifinals ===
The top three finishers in each heat advanced to the final. The results of the non-advancing swimmers are unclear, but Raymond Thorne, Edwin Swatek and Bill Orthwein are named by de Wael as possible competitors.

==== Semifinal 1 ====
Rank	Swimmer	Nation	Time	Notes
1	Zoltán Halmay	Hungary	1:06.2	Q, OR
2	Scott Leary	United States	Unknown	Q
3	David Hammond	United States	Unknown	Q
4	Unknown	United States	Unknown	
5	Unknown	United States	Unknown	

==== Semifinal 2 ====
Rank	Swimmer	Nation	Time	Notes
1	Charles Daniels	United States	1:07.4	Q
2	David Gaul	United States	Unknown	Q
3	Leo Goodwin	United States	Unknown	Q
4	Unknown	United States	Unknown	

=== Final ===
Rank	Swimmer	Nation	Time	Notes
1st place, gold medalist(s)	Zoltán Halmay	Hungary	1:02.8	OR
2nd place, silver medalist(s)	Charles Daniels	United States	Unknown	
3rd place, bronze medalist(s)	Scott Leary	United States	Unknown	
4	David Gaul	United States	Unknown	
5	David Hammond	United States	Unknown	
6	Leo Goodwin	United States	Unknown	

== Sources ==
- De Wael, Herman (2000). "Herman's Full Olympians".
- Wudarski, Pawel (1999). "Wyniki Igrzysk Olimpijskich" (in Polish).
