= Swimming at the 1904 Summer Olympics – Men's 50 yard freestyle =

Men's 50-yard freestyle at the Games of the III Olympiad
- The start of the first semifinal
- Venue: Temporary, artificial expedition lake in Forest Park, St. Louis
- Date: September 6
- Competitors: 6 from 2 nations

Medalists
1st place, gold medalist(s)		Zoltán Halmay	Hungary
2nd place, silver medalist(s)		Scott Leary	United States
3rd place, bronze medalist(s)		Charles Daniels	United States

The men's 50-yard freestyle event at the 1904 Summer Olympics was held on September 6 in an artificial lake in Forest Park, St. Louis.

One Hungarian, Zoltán Halmay, and five Americans, led by Scott Leary, qualified for the final. In the final, Halmay won, but the judges at the time could not decide on a winner, and it was determined that Halmay and Leary should compete against each other again. In the deciding race between Halmay and Leary, Halmay again led from start to finish to win with a world record time of 28 seconds.

== Background ==
It was the first time that a distance this short had been contested at the Olympics, and it was not an event at the following Olympics. It was not until 1988 that the sprint freestyle event was reintroduced with a distance of 50 meters. The event was held in a temporary, artificial exhibition lake in Forest Park, St. Louis, with six swimmers from two nations competing. It took place on September 6.

== Format ==
The competition consisted of two rounds: semifinals and a final. There were two semifinals, with the top three swimmers in each semifinal advancing to the final round.

== Semifinals ==
Hungarian Zoltán Halmay won the first semifinal with a time of 29.6 seconds, and American Scott Leary won the second with a time of 28.2. Americans Leo Goodwin, Raymond Thorne, Charles Daniels, and David Gaul also qualified.

Results of the first semifinal
Rank	Swimmer	Nation	Time (s)	Notes
1	Zoltán Halmay	Hungary	29.6	Q
2	Leo Goodwin	United States	Unknown	Q
3	Raymond Thorne	United States	Unknown	Q

Results of the second semifinal
Rank	Swimmer	Nation	Time (s)	Notes
1	Scott Leary	United States	28.2	Q
2	Charles Daniels	United States	Unknown	Q
3	David Gaul	United States	Unknown	Q

== Final ==
Photograph of the finish of the final, showing Halmay in the lead

Halmay appeared to win the race, using an arm-dominated technique with little kicking. The judges were seated high in the stands and could not agree on who won, with a Hungarian judge claiming Halmay won, and American judges claiming Leary won. Leary also claimed after the race that Halmay had pulled him back close to the finish. In the Journal of Olympic History, Robert and David Barney described the ensuing chaos as resembling a "pub brawl", where a physical altercation occurred and the matter was not able to be resolved. Due to the controversy in the final, officials organized a run-off between Halmay and Leary. Later, photographs from the finish of the event showed Halmay to be the winner of this race.

Final results
Rank	Swimmer	Nation	Time (s)
=1	Zoltán Halmay	Hungary	28.2
=1	Scott Leary	United States	28.2
3rd place, bronze medalist(s)	Charles Daniels	United States	Unknown
4	David Gaul	United States	Unknown
5	Leo Goodwin	United States	Unknown
6	Raymond Thorne	United States	Unknown

=== Swim-off ===
The run-off involved the two swimmers racing again to determine the winner. This was the first instance at the Olympics of what is now called a swim-off, which is now used in some situations in swimming competitions to break ties. Both Halmay and Leary committed a false start before the race commenced. Halmay then led throughout the swim-off to win with a world record of 28.0.

Swim-off results
Rank	Swimmer	Nation	Time (s)
1st place, gold medalist(s)	Zoltán Halmay	Hungary	28.0
2nd place, silver medalist(s)	Scott Leary	United States	28.6

== Bibliography ==
- Barney, Robert; Barney, David (October 2004). "Beyond Clotworthy and Aquatics St. Louis 1904 – Fancy Diving: A Centennial View of Swimming and Diving at the Games of the Third Olympiad" (PDF). Journal of Olympic History. 12 (3): 17–18.
