= Hungary at the 1904 Summer Olympics =

- IOC code: HUN
- NOC: Hungarian Olympic Committee

in St. Louis
- Competitors: 4 in 2 sports
- Medals Ranked 5th: Gold 2 Silver 1 Bronze 1 Total 4

Summer Olympics appearances (overview)
- 1896; 1900; 1904; 1908; 1912; 1920; 1924; 1928; 1932; 1936; 1948; 1952; 1956; 1960; 1964; 1968; 1972; 1976; 1980; 1984; 1988; 1992; 1996; 2000; 2004; 2008; 2012; 2016; 2020; 2024

Other related appearances
- 1906 Intercalated Games

Hungary competed at the 1904 Summer Olympics in St. Louis, United States. Austrian and Hungarian results at early Olympic Games are generally kept separate despite the union of the two nations as Austria-Hungary at the time.

== Medalists ==
The following Hungarian competitors won medals at the games. In the discipline sections below, the medalists' names are bolded.

Medal	Name	Sport	Event	Date
Gold	Zoltán Halmay	Swimming	Men's 100 yard freestyle	5 September
Gold	Zoltán Halmay	Swimming	Men's 50 yard freestyle	6 September
Silver	Géza Kiss	Swimming	Men's 1 mile freestyle	6 September
Bronze	Géza Kiss	Swimming	Men's 880 yard freestyle	7 September

Default sort order: Medal, Date, Name

Medals by sport
**Sport**	1st place, gold medalist(s)	2nd place, silver medalist(s)	3rd place, bronze medalist(s)	**Total**
Swimming	2	1	1	**4**
Total	2	1	1	4

=== Multiple medalists ===
The following competitors won multiple medals at the 1904 Olympic Games.

Name	Medal	Sport	Event
Zoltán Halmay	Gold; Gold	Swimming	Men's 100 yard freestyle Men's 50 yard freestyle
Géza Kiss	Silver; Bronze	Swimming	Men's 1 mile freestyle Men's 880 yard freestyle

== Competitors ==
The following is the list of number of competitors participating in the Games:

Sport	Men	Women	Total
Athletics	2	0	2
Swimming	2	0	2
Total	4	0	4

The following is the list of dates, when Hungary won medals:

Medals by date
Date	Gold medal	Silver medal	Bronze medal	Total
5 September	1	0	0	1
6 September	1	1	0	2
7 September	0	0	1	1
Total	2	1	1	4

== Athletics ==
Men
Track & road events

Athlete	Event	Heat		Repechage		Final	
Athlete	Event	Result	Rank	Result	Rank	Result	Rank
Béla Mező	60 m	unknown	4	did not advance			
Béla Mező	100 m	unknown	3	—N/a		did not advance	

Field events

Athlete	Event	Distance	Rank
Lajos Gönczy	High jump	1.75	4
Lajos Gönczy	Standing high jump	1.35	5
Béla Mező	Long jump	unknown	7-10

== Swimming ==
Men

Athlete	Event	Heat		Final	
Athlete	Event	Time	Rank	Time	Rank
Zoltán Halmay	50 yd freestyle	29.6	1 Q	28.2	(gold) ^{1}
Zoltán Halmay	100 yd freestyle	1:06.2	1 Q	1:02.8	1st place, gold medalist(s)
Géza Kiss	880 yd freestyle	—N/a		unknown	3rd place, bronze medalist(s)
Géza Kiss	1 mile freestyle	—N/a		28:28.2	2nd place, silver medalist(s)

Note

^{1}Halmay tied with Leary in the final. A swim-off was held between them, which Halmay won and was awarded with the gold medal. His time was 28.0, Leary's time was 28.6.
