= Austria at the 1904 Summer Olympics =

- IOC code: AUT

in St. Louis
- Competitors: 2 in 2 sports
- Medals: Gold 0 Silver 0 Bronze 0 Total 0

Summer Olympics appearances (overview)
- 1896; 1900; ~~1904~~; 1908; 1912; 1920; 1924; 1928; 1932; 1936; 1948; 1952; 1956; 1960; 1964; 1968; 1972; 1976; 1980; 1984; 1988; 1992; 1996; 2000; 2004; 2008; 2012; 2016; 2020; 2024; 2028

Other related appearances
- 1906 Intercalated Games

Austria did not send an official national team to the 1904 Summer Olympics in St. Louis, United States. However, two Austrians competed—Julius Lenhart and Otto Wahle—though not under a formal national team banner, as those were not introduced until later Games.

Austrian and Hungarian results at early Olympic Games are generally kept separate despite the union of the two nations as Austria-Hungary at the time.

Austrian gymnast Julius Lenhart, who from 1903 to 1906 worked in America and in 1904 represented the sports club Philadelphia Turngemeinde mainly attended by German speaking gymnasts, won two gold medals and one silver medal, making him the most successful Austrian competitor ever at the Summer Olympic Games.

Otto Wahle swam at both the 1900 Paris and 1904 St. Louis Olympics, winning two silver medals (1,000 metres freestyle and 200 metres obstacle course in 1900) for Austrian national team, and a bronze medal (440 yards freestyle in 1904).

== Disputed country attribution ==
Julius Lenhart's nationality at the time has been the subject of historical discussion, although the official 1904 Olympic entry lists recorded him as representing the United States. Because athletes did not compete for their nations at the early Olympic Games between 1896 and 1904, as they do now, his participation and both medals are attributed by the International Olympic Committee (IOC) to the United States, reflecting the club affiliation under which he competed rather than his nationality.

Otto Wahle was an Austrian national until 1906 when he became a US citizen, after settling in New York. He competed for Austria at both the 1900 and 1904 Olympics, while being affiliated with the New York Athletic Club at the latter Games. However, unlike in 1900, his bronze medal from 1904 is attributed to the United States because he competed for an American sports club.

Since 2024, the IOC has applied this attribution policy consistently to all competitors and events at the early Olympic Games between 1896 and 1904, thereby confirming the attribution of Lenhart's two medals and Wahle's bronze medal to the United States. His case is one of several early Olympic examples in which medal attribution follows club representation instead of the athlete's citizenship.

== Reallocated medals ==
| Medal | Name | Sport | Event | Reallocated to |
|---|---|---|---|---|
| Gold | Julius Lenhart | Gymnastics Artistic | Men's artistic individual all-around | United States |
| Silver | Julius Lenhart | Gymnastics Artistic | Men's triathlon (combined 3 events) | United States |
| Bronze | Otto Wahle | Swimming | Men's 440 Yard Freestyle | United States |

== Gymnastics ==
| Athlete | Events | Final | |
| Athlete | Events | Result | Rank |
|---|---|---|---|
| Julius Lenhart | Men's all-around | 69.80 | 1st place, gold medalist(s) |
| Julius Lenhart | Men's triathlon | 43.00 | 2nd place, silver medalist(s) |
| Julius Lenhart | Team all-around | Unknown | 1st place, gold medalist(s) |

== Swimming ==
| Athlete | Events | Final | |
| Athlete | Events | Result | Rank |
|---|---|---|---|
| Otto Wahle | Men's 440 yard freestyle | 6:39.0 | 3rd place, bronze medalist(s) |
| Otto Wahle | Men's 880 yard freestyle | Did not finish | |
| Otto Wahle | Men's 1 mile freestyle | Unknown | 4 |
