= Swimming at the 1906 Intercalated Games =

At the 1906 Summer Olympics, only four swimming events were contested. Now called the Intercalated Games, the 1906 Games are no longer considered as an official Olympic Games by the International Olympic Committee.

== Medal summary ==
Games	Gold	Silver	Bronze
100 m freestyle	Charles Daniels; United States	Zoltán Halmay; Hungary	Cecil Healy; Australia
400 m freestyle	Otto Scheff; Austria	Henry Taylor; Great Britain	John Arthur Jarvis; Great Britain
1 mile freestyle	Henry Taylor; Great Britain	John Arthur Jarvis; Great Britain	Otto Scheff; Austria
4 × 250 m freestyle relay	Hungary; Henrik Hajós; Zoltán Halmay; Géza Kiss; József Ónody	Germany; Ernst Bahnmeyer; Max Pape; Emil Rausch; Oscar Schiele	Great Britain; John Derbyshire; William Henry; John Arthur Jarvis; Henry Taylor

== Medal table ==
Rank	Nation	Gold	Silver	Bronze	Total
1	Great Britain	1	2	2	5
2	Hungary	1	1	0	2
3	Austria	1	0	1	2
4	United States	1	0	0	1
5	Germany	0	1	0	1
6	Australia	0	0	1	1
Totals (6 entries)		4	4	4	12
