= Francis Gailey =

Australian-American swimmer

Personal information
- Full name: Francis Gailey
- Nationality: Australian
- Born: 21 January 1882 Brisbane, Queensland
- Died: 10 July 1972 (aged 90) Garden Grove, California

Sport
- Sport: Swimming
- Strokes: Freestyle
- Club: Olympic Club, San Francisco
Medal record
Men's swimming
Representing the United States
Olympic Games
| Silver medal – second place | 1904 St. Louis | 220 yard freestyle |
| Silver medal – second place | 1904 St. Louis | 440 yard freestyle |
| Silver medal – second place | 1904 St. Louis | 880 yard freestyle |
| Bronze medal – third place | 1904 St. Louis | 1 mile freestyle |

Francis Gailey (21 January 1882 – 10 July 1972) was an Australian competition swimmer who swam in the 1904 Summer Olympics held in St. Louis, Missouri.

Gailey was born in Brisbane, Queensland, Australia, but later emigrated to the United States (census records variously state the year as 1901, 1902, and 1906) and became a naturalized U.S. citizen. For the 1904 Olympics, he was sponsored by the Olympic Club of San Francisco. The International Olympic Committee (IOC) had officially counted Gailey's four medals for the United States, although research undertaken by several Australian newspapers in 2008–09 showed that Gailey was an Australian citizen at the time. In 2009, the Australian Olympic Committee stated that "Gailey's medals, newly credited to Australia, increase the nation's total at summer Olympics to 449".

From 2021 to 2024, the IOC briefly attributed medals in individual events according to the athlete's nationality, attributing Gailey's medals to Australia. Since 2024, participation and medals have instead been attributed according to the national affiliation of the club or team represented by the athlete, reinstating the IOC's original policy for the early Olympics (1896–1904).

At the 1904 Summer Olympics, Gailey competed in four swimming events, and due to the lack of entrants all the events were straight finals. On 6 September he entered the 220 yard freestyle, where he finished just under two seconds behind American Charles Daniels and gained a silver medal. On the same day he also entered the 1 mile freestyle and, after swimming for nearly 29 minutes, he finished in third place behind German Emil Rausch and Hungarian Géza Kiss. The next day Gailey competed in his other two events, the 440 yard freestyle, where again he finished second to Charles Daniels, and then the 880 yard freestyle, where German Emil Rausch again beat him. In his two days of events he finished with three silver medals and one bronze.

In 1906, Gailey sailed to San Francisco on the SS Sonoma, and worked as an insurance clerk in California, lived for a time in Ontario, California, where he married Mary Adams in 1914 or 1915, and finally settled in southern California in 1918, working as a foreman in the oil industry and managing orange-grove plantations.

== See also ==
- List of Olympic medalists in swimming (men)
