= Swimming at the 1904 Summer Olympics – Men's 1 mile freestyle =

Men's 1 mile freestyle at the Games of the III Olympiad
- Venue: Forest Park
- Date: September 6
- Competitors: 7 from 5 nations

Medalists
1st place, gold medalist(s)		Emil Rausch	Germany
2nd place, silver medalist(s)		Géza Kiss	Hungary
3rd place, bronze medalist(s)		Francis Gailey	Australia

The men's 1 mile freestyle was a swimming event held as part of the Swimming at the 1904 Summer Olympics programme. It was the first time the event was held at such a distance at the Olympics and the only time the mile was used; later incarnations of the event used 1500 metres as the distance.

7 swimmers from 5 nations competed.

== Results ==
=== Final ===
Final
1st place, gold medalist(s)	Emil Rausch (GER)	27:18.2
2nd place, silver medalist(s)	Géza Kiss (HUN)	28:28.2
3rd place, bronze medalist(s)	Francis Gailey (AUS)	28:54.0
4.	Otto Wahle (AUT)	
—	Edgar Adams (USA)	Did not finish
—	Louis Handley (USA)	Did not finish
—	John Meyers (USA)	Did not finish

== Sources ==
- Wudarski, Pawel (1999). "Wyniki Igrzysk Olimpijskich" (in Polish).
