= Swimming at the 1904 Summer Olympics – Men's 880 yard freestyle =

Men's 880 yard freestyle at the Games of the III Olympiad
- Venue: Forest Park
- Date: September 7
- Competitors: 6 from 5 nations

Medalists
1st place, gold medalist(s)		Emil Rausch	Germany
2nd place, silver medalist(s)		Francis Gailey	Australia
3rd place, bronze medalist(s)		Géza Kiss	Hungary

The men's 880 yard freestyle was a swimming event held as part of the Swimming at the 1904 Summer Olympics programme. The length of 880 yards (804.672 metres) was slightly longer than the 800 metres. It was the only time the event was held at the Olympics; the men's 800 metre freestyle event was introduced 116 years later, at the 2020 Summer Olympics.

6 swimmers from 5 nations competed.

== Results ==
Rank	Swimmer	Nation	Time
1st place, gold medalist(s)	Emil Rausch	Germany	13:11.4
2nd place, silver medalist(s)	Francis Gailey	Australia	13:23.4
3rd place, bronze medalist(s)	Géza Kiss	Hungary	Unknown
4	Edgar Adams	United States	Unknown
5	Jam Handy	United States	Unknown
—	Otto Wahle	Austria	DNF

== Sources ==
- Wudarski, Pawel (1999). "Wyniki Igrzysk Olimpijskich" (in Polish).
