= Charles Thias =

American tug-of-war competitor

Olympic medal record

Men's Tug of war

Representing Mixed team
Bronze medal – third place	1904 St. Louis	Team competition

Charles Henry Robert Thias (November 15, 1879 – November 19, 1922) was an American tug of war athlete who competed in the 1904 Summer Olympics. In the 1904 Olympics, he won a bronze medal as a member of Southwest Turnverein of Saint Louis No. 2 team, which is officially considered a mixed team. He was born in Illinois and died in San Francisco, California.
