= Australia at the 1904 Summer Olympics =

- IOC code: AUS
- NOC: Australian Olympic Committee

in St. Louis, United States 1 July – 23 November 1904
- Competitors: 3 in 2 sports and 7 events
- Medals: Gold 0 Silver 0 Bronze 0 Total 0

Summer Olympics appearances (overview)
- 1896; 1900; 1904; 1908; 1912; 1920; 1924; 1928; 1932; 1936; 1948; 1952; 1956; 1960; 1964; 1968; 1972; 1976; 1980; 1984; 1988; 1992; 1996; 2000; 2004; 2008; 2012; 2016; 2020; 2024; 2028

Other related appearances
- 1906 Intercalated Games –––– Australasia (1908–1912)

Three athletes from Australia competed at the 1904 Summer Olympics in St. Louis, United States. Although this was the third games at which athletes from Australia participated, it was the first time that athletes competed representing the Commonwealth of Australia, which had come into existence at Federation in 1901.

== Disputed country attribution ==
For many years, it was believed that either one or two Australians had competed at the Games, with neither winning medals. However, in 2009, it came to light that swimmer Frank Gailey; born in Brisbane, Queensland, Australia; who later immigrated to the United States and became a U.S. citizen, had not yet done so when he competed at the Games, and the main reason he was wrongly identified as an American at the time was because he had joined the San Francisco Olympic club. Gailey won three silver medals and one bronze medal. The IOC had previously counted Gailey's four medals for the United States, but subsequently adjusted their database in July 2021 to count these medals for Australia. Since 2024, participation and medals have instead been attributed according to the national affiliation of the club or team represented by the athlete, reinstating the IOC's original policy for the early Olympics (1896–1904).

== Reallocated medalists ==
Medal	Name	Sport	Event	Date	Reallocated to
Silver	Francis Gailey	Swimming	220 yard freestyle	September 6	United States
Silver	Francis Gailey	Swimming	440 yard freestyle	September 7	United States
Silver	Francis Gailey	Swimming	880 yard freestyle	September 7	United States
Bronze	Francis Gailey	Swimming	1 mile freestyle	September 6	United States

== Athletics ==
Track & road events

Athlete	Events	Heat		Final	
Athlete	Events	Result	Rank	Result	Rank
Corrie Gardner	110 m hurdles	Unknown	4	did not advance	
Leslie McPherson	110 m hurdles	did not start		did not advance	
Leslie McPherson	400 m hurdles	did not start		did not advance	

Field events

Athlete	Events	Final	
Athlete	Events	Distance	Rank
Corrie Gardner	Men's long jump	Unknown	Unknown
Leslie McPherson	Men's long jump	did not start	

== Swimming ==
Athlete	Events	Final	
Athlete	Events	Result	Rank
Francis Gailey	Men's 220 yard freestyle	2:46.0	2nd place, silver medalist(s)
Francis Gailey	Men's 440 yard freestyle	6:22.0	2nd place, silver medalist(s)
Francis Gailey	Men's 880 yard freestyle	13:23.4	2nd place, silver medalist(s)
Francis Gailey	Men's 1 mile freestyle	28.54.0	3rd place, bronze medalist(s)
