= Swimming at the 1904 Summer Olympics – Men's 440 yard freestyle =

Men's 440 yard freestyle at the Games of the III Olympiad
- Venue: Forest Park
- Date: September 7
- Competitors: 4 from 3 nations

Medalists
1st place, gold medalist(s)		Charles Daniels	United States
2nd place, silver medalist(s)		Francis Gailey	Australia
3rd place, bronze medalist(s)		Otto Wahle	United States

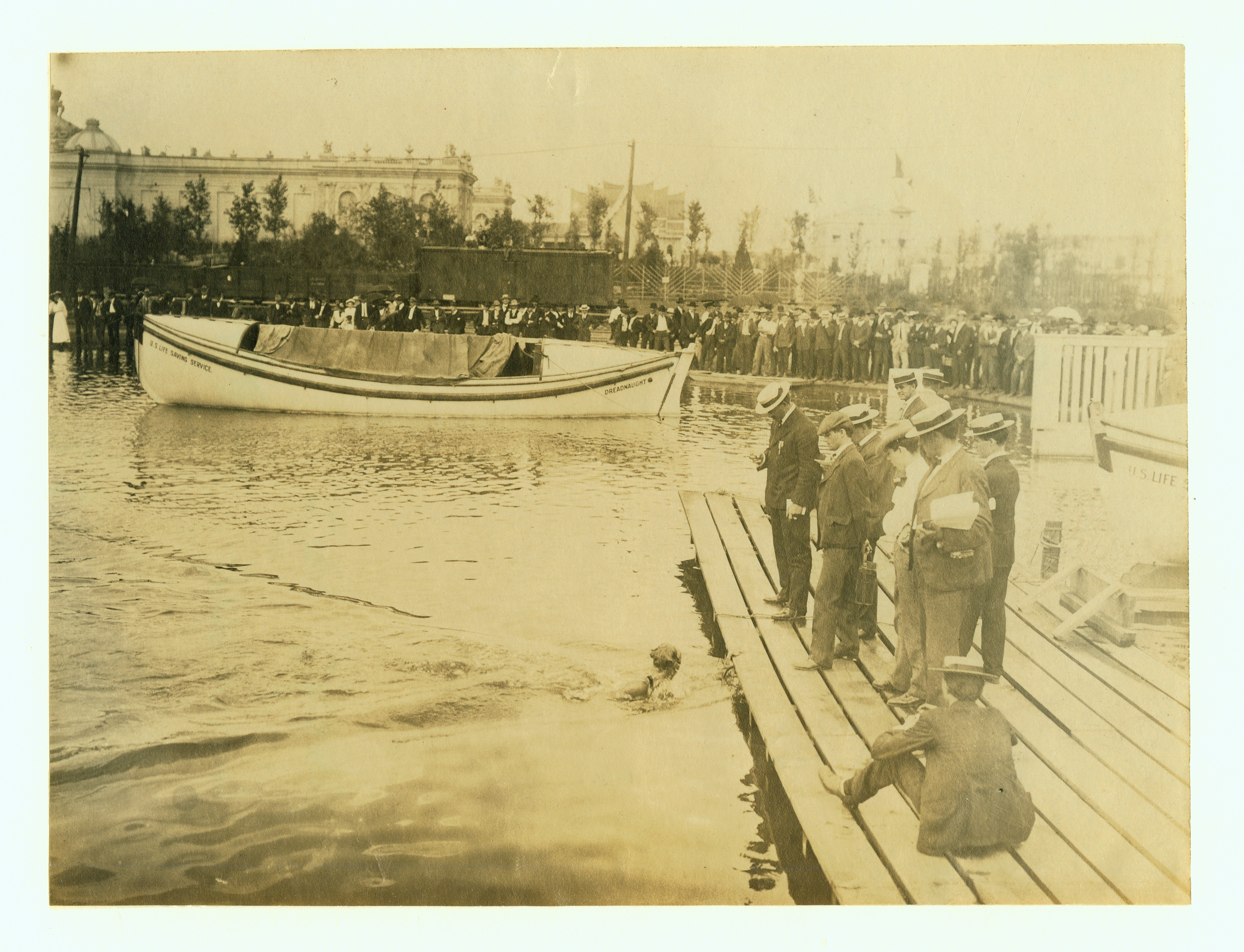
1904 Olympics: Daniels of the New York Athletic Club winning the 440 yard swim.

The men's 440 yard freestyle was a swimming event held as part of the Swimming at the 1904 Summer Olympics programme. It was the first time the event was held at the Olympics, and the only time yards were used instead of metres. The length of 440 yards (402.336 metres) was slightly longer than the 400 metres that would be used in every subsequent edition of the swimming programme.

4 swimmers from 3 nations competed.

== Results ==
=== Final ===
Final
1st place, gold medalist(s)	Charles Daniels (USA)	6:16.2
2nd place, silver medalist(s)	Francis Gailey (AUS)	6:22.0
3rd place, bronze medalist(s)	Otto Wahle (USA)	6:39.0
4.	Leo Goodwin (USA)	

== Sources ==
- Wudarski, Pawel (1999). "Wyniki Igrzysk Olimpijskich" (in Polish).
