= Swimming at the 1904 Summer Olympics =

Swimming at the Games of the III Olympiad
- Venue: Forest Park
- Dates: 4–6 September 1904
- No. of events: 9
- Competitors: 32 from 5 nations

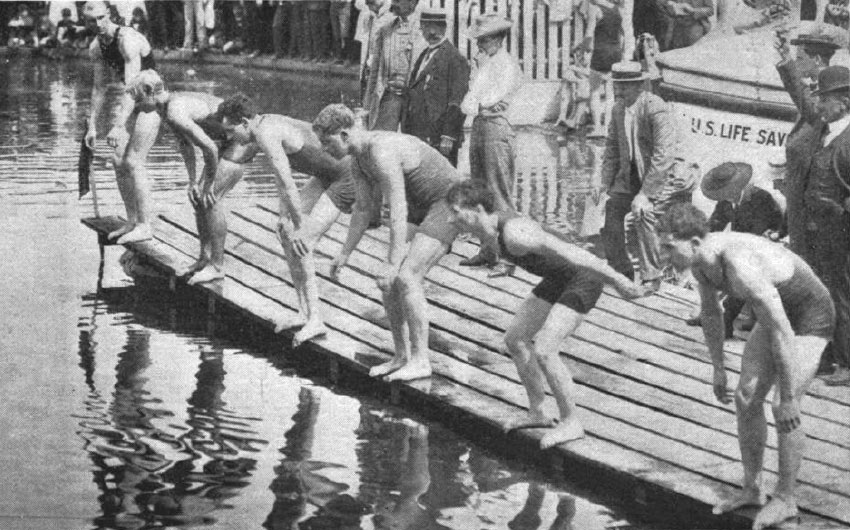
The start of 100 yards freestyle swimming during 1904 Summer Olympics

At the 1904 Summer Olympics, nine swimming events were contested. The 1904 swimming competition was the only time in Olympic history that racing distances were measured in yards. The competition was held September 4–6, 1904. There was a total of 32 participants from 5 countries competing. The swimming competitions comprised 9 or 10 events, depending on whether the plunge for distance is classified as a swimming or diving event, and were held in a man-made lake used by the Coast Guard for lifesaving exhibitions.

The short sprint, at 50 yards (46 m), made its first Olympic appearance in 1904. The 100 returned after not being contested in 1900. The 1000 metres and 4000 metres were replaced with the much shorter 440 yards (400 m) and 1-mile (1,600 m) events, making the 200 the only freestyle event to be held for the second time in a row.

The 200 metre backstroke was shortened to 100 yards (91 m) and the team swimming event was replaced with a 4 × 50 yard freestyle relay. The obstacle course and underwater swimming events were eliminated, while breaststroke made its Olympic debut.

== Medal table ==
Rank	Nation	Gold	Silver	Bronze	Total
1	Germany	4	2	2	8
2	United States	3	6	6	15
3	Hungary	2	1	1	4
Totals (3 entries)		9	9	9	27

== Medal summary ==
Games	Gold	Silver	Bronze
50 yard freestyle	Zoltán Halmay; Hungary	Scott Leary; United States	Charles Daniels; United States
100 yard freestyle	Zoltán Halmay; Hungary	Charles Daniels; United States	Scott Leary; United States
220 yard freestyle	Charles Daniels; United States	Francis Gailey (AUS); United States (Note: Gailey was born in Brisbane, Queensland, Australia, but later emigrated to the United States and became a naturalized U.S. citizen in 1906: at the 1904 Olympics, he was sponsored by the Olympic Club of San Francisco. The International Olympic Committee (IOC) had previously counted Gailey's four medals for the United States. From 2021 to 2024, the IOC briefly attributed medals in individual events according to the athlete's nationality, attributing Gailey's medals to Australia. Since 2024, participation and medals have instead been attributed according to the national affiliation of the club or team represented by the athlete, reinstating the IOC's original policy for the early Olympics (1896–1904).)	Emil Rausch; Germany
440 yard freestyle	Charles Daniels; United States	Francis Gailey (AUS); United States	Otto Wahle; United States
880 yard freestyle	Emil Rausch; Germany	Francis Gailey (AUS); United States	Géza Kiss; Hungary
1 mile freestyle	Emil Rausch; Germany	Géza Kiss; Hungary	Francis Gailey (AUS); United States
100 yard backstroke	Walter Brack; Germany	Georg Hoffmann; Germany	Georg Zacharias; Germany
440 yard breaststroke	Georg Zacharias; Germany	Walter Brack; Germany	Jam Handy; United States
4 × 50 yard freestyle relay	United States; New York Athletic Club; Joe Ruddy; Leo Goodwin; Louis Handley; Charles Daniels	United States; Chicago Athletic Association; David Hammond; Bill Tuttle; Hugo Goetz; Raymond Thorne	United States; Missouri Athletic Club; Amedee Reyburn; Gwynne Evans; Marquard Schwarz; Bill Orthwein

== Participating nations ==
32 swimmers from 5 nations competed.

- Austria (1)
- Australia (1)
- Germany (4)
- Hungary (2)
- United States (24)
