= David Gaul =

American swimmer (1886–1962)

- Image of Gaul, 1903, at 17

Personal information
- Full name: David Thomas Gaul Sr.
- National team: United States
- Born: July 7, 1886 Lafayette, Pennsylvania
- Died: August 6, 1962 (aged 76) Philadelphia, Pennsylvania

Sport
- Sport: Swimming
- Strokes: Freestyle
- Club: Philadelphia Swimming Club

David Thomas Gaul (July 7, 1886 – August 6, 1962) was an American competition swimmer who swam primarily for the Philadelphia Swimming Club. He represented the United States as a 17-year-old at the 1904 Summer Olympics in St. Louis, Missouri, where he finished in fourth place in the 50- and 100-yard freestyle events. Gaul died in Pennsylvania at the age of 76.

Gaul was born July 7, 1886 in Philadelphia, Pennsylvania, and swam for National Swimming Association of Philadelphia and the Philadelphia Swimming Club. He was mostly likely coached by Philadelphia area swim coach George Kistler at the National Swimming Association. In August, 1903, representing the National Swimming Association at the age of 17, he won the Sackett Challenge Cup, winning the 100-yard race in a time of 1:11.6 at Lafayette in the Schuykill River. He also won the half mile distance race in a time of 17:19.4. In a 50-yard handicap, Gaul was credited unofficially with breaking the American record with a time of 31 seconds. He also won the 600-yard freestyle handicap race in a time of 10:19.2.

== 1904 Olympics ==
The 1904 Olympics in St. Louis were conducted as part of the Louisiana Purchase Exposition, a World's Fair. The swimming and water polo events were held in early September in the lake that hosted lifesaving exhibitions. The lake was a man-made open body of water and had no lanes or starting blocks for swimming competition. The aquatic area used was not constructed for competitive swimming, and the water was reportedly contaminated, which led to health risks for a few athletes.

Representing the United States as a 17-year-old at the 1904 Summer Olympics in St. Louis, Missouri, he finished in fourth place in the 50-yard freestyle. In a close and contested finish, Zoltan Hamay of Hungary took the gold medal with a time of 28.0, with American Scott Leary taking the silver with a time of 28.6. The bronze was won by American Charlie Daniels, a well-known competitor, though his time was not recorded.

Gaul also placed fourth in the 100-yard freestyle, where Hungary's Zoltan Hamay swam a 1:02.8, again taking the gold, with American Charlie Daniels taking the silver, and Scott Leary taking the bronze medal.

Gaul died in Pennsylvania at the age of 76.
