= Oscar Friede =

American tug of war competitor

Olympic medal record

Men's Tug of war

Representing Mixed team
Bronze medal – third place	1904 St. Louis	Team competition

Oscar Charles Friede (July 14, 1882 – February 14, 1943) was an American tug of war athlete who competed in the 1904 Summer Olympics. He died in St. Louis, Missouri. In the 1904 Olympics he won a bronze medal as a member of Southwest Turnverein of Saint Louis No. 2 team, which is officially considered a mixed team.
