= Scott Leary =

American swimmer (1881–1958)

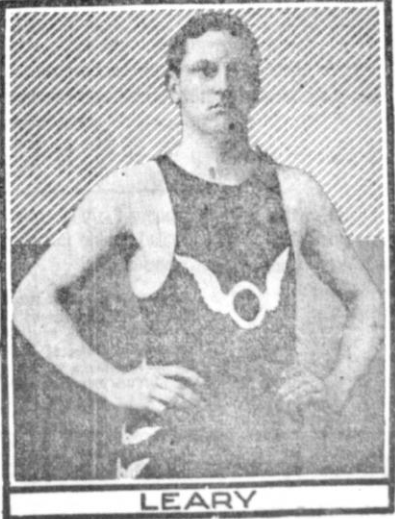
- Leary circa 1906, wearing the flying "O" jersey of the Olympic Club

Personal information
- Full name: John Scott Leary
- National team: United States
- Born: December 29, 1881 Shasta, California
- Died: July 1, 1958 (aged 76) San Francisco, California
- Spouse: H. Helen Wollenberg m 1911

Sport
- Sport: Swimming
- Strokes: Freestyle
- Club: Olympic Club
- Coach: Sydney Cavill
Medal record
Men's swimming
Representing the United States
Olympic Games
Silver medal – second place	1904 St. Louis	50 yd freestyle
Bronze medal – third place	1904 St. Louis	100 yd freestyle

John Scott Leary (December 29, 1881 – July 1, 1958) was an American freestyle swimmer who competed in the 1904 Summer Olympics in St. Louis, Missouri. He won a silver medal in the 50-yard freestyle and a bronze in the 100-yard freestyle. Leary is widely acclaimed for helping to introduce his use of the Australian crawl to American swimming spectators and competitors and for breaking the world record in the 100-yard swim in July, 1905, with a time of 60 seconds.

Born on December 29, 1881 in Shasta, California, Leary is believed to have first joined San Francisco's Olympic Club around 1899 at the age of 17.

In June 1901, the San Francisco Call reported that Leary had set a new world record in the 50 yard swimming sprint, then known as the dash with a time of 29.2 seconds, though it seems probable English swimmer John Derbyshire had already eclipsed that time. In January 1906, the Call reported Leary had set a new American amateur record in that distance with the time of 26.2, 0.4 seconds faster than the previous record set by J.W. Lawrence in 1905.

In August 1901, the Call reported that Leary had set a new American record in the 100 yard swim with a time of 1:03.5, besting the prior record by 2.5 seconds.

== 1904 St. Louis Olympics ==
At the 1904 Olympics, Leary won a silver medal in the 50-yard freestyle and a bronze medal in the 100-yard freestyle at the Life Saving Exhibition Lake in Forest Park, in St. Louis, Missouri.

=== Silver medal ===
Leary originally tied in the final heat of the 50-yard freestyle with Hungarian Zoltan Halmay, as both swimmers recorded a time of 28.2 . However, the final heat of the event was controversial, and when Leary claimed Halmay had tried to hold him to prevent him from finishing near the end of the race, the swim was repeated. In the resulting "swim-off", Leary swam the fifty-yard freestyle in a time of 28.6 seconds taking second place to Halmay who took the gold with a time of 28.0. The swim-off between Leary and Halmay was made tenser by two false starts, yet Halmay, after a good start, led the entire race. The bronze medal for the third place finisher went to American Charlie Daniels. Subject to a long rivalry, Daniels would never again lose to Halmay.

=== Bronze medal ===
In the 100-yard freestyle, Leary, took the third place bronze, two places behind Hungarian Zoltan Halmay, who won the gold with a time of 1:02.8. American Charlie Daniels took the silver medal.

== Using the Australian crawl ==
In 1905, Leary began working with Australian Syd Cavill as his coach, and began to master the Australian crawl. The Cavill family were credited with inventing the Australian crawl, and further developing it and teaching it. Sydney Cavill held an Australian swimming championship and after arriving in America around 1899 with his brothers, began coaching at the Olympic club around 1905, continuing until his retirement in 1929. Cavill may have started working with Leary before he formally began as a coach for the Olympic Club, but was definitely available to him as coach by 1905. In addition to teaching the Australian crawl, Cavill originated the two hands simultaneously forward arm movement later used for the butterfly.

After instruction from Sydney Cavill, Leary began to dominate American swimming in sprint events in 1905 and 1906 moving to the Australian crawl and dropping the Trudgeon stroke. The Trudgeon stroke used the less effective scissor kick, contrasted with the more frequent and powerful flutter kick used by the Australian crawl. The Trudgeon also featured a kick every other stroke, while the crawl kick could be repeated with greater frequency if desired. In the Australian crawl, the swimmer may alternate sides somewhat more effectively with the side performing the hand stroke out of the water roughly 45 degrees to the bottom of the pool, though the degree of rotation could vary and be greater than 45 degrees. Eventually swimmer Charlie Daniels began using the Australian crawl as well and resumed his prior place as America’s leading swimming competitor.

In England in 1902, Zoltan Cavill, using the Australian crawl, was considered by many swimming historians to be the first to swim 100 yards in under a minute, though the time may not have been considered an official record.

=== World 100-yard record ===
On July 18, 1905, Leary, while swimming for the Olympic Club using the Australian crawl, became the first person to swim 100 yards in exactly 60 seconds, for the very widely followed sprint event. The new record, set at Portland's Guild's Lake, beat the previous record for the 100 by 2.8 seconds. In 1906, Leary handily won the National AAU 100-yard title in Chicago.

Continuing to swim in October 1909, Leary, competing for the Olympic Club, won the 100-yard swim in a time of 1:06.8 leading second place swimmer O'Malley throughout, at Spreckels Lake in Golden Gate Park.

=== Later life ===
Leary was married to Hannah Helen Wollenberg of San Francisco, known as Hellen, in San Francisco on April 19, 1911 at St. Bridgid's Church by Reverend Father Kelleher. Helen's parents were Marks and Amalie Wollenberg.

He later served as a starting official for swim events and continued serving with the Olympic club through 1929.

Leary died on July 1, 1958 in San Francisco of a reported heart attack, and was survived by a niece and two nephews. A high mass was performed at San Francisco's St. Mary's Cathedral on the morning of July 3. He was buried at Holy Cross Catholic Cemetery in Colma, California, as had been his wife Hellen Wollenberg Leary of 32 years, who predeceased him on August 7, 1943. Several news sources reported on his death that he had set the record of 60 seconds for the 100-yard swim in 1902, rather than 1905.

== See also ==
- List of Olympic medalists in swimming (men)
