= Swimming at the 1904 Summer Olympics – Men's 220 yard freestyle =

Men's 220 yard freestyle at the Games of the III Olympiad
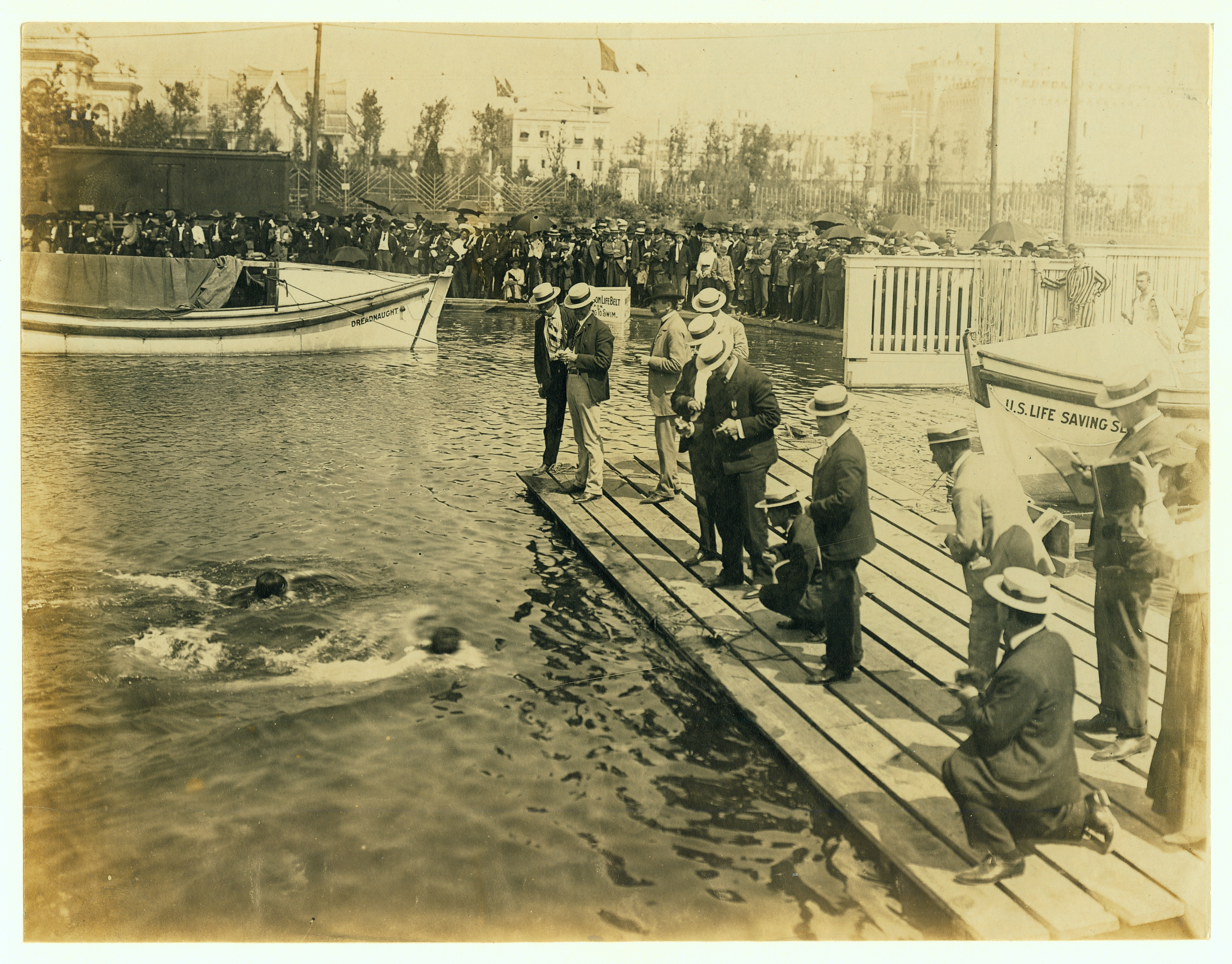
- The finish of the competition, with Charles Daniels ahead of Francis Gailey
- Venue: Forest Park
- Date: September 6
- Competitors: 4 from 3 nations
- Winning time: 2:44.2

Medalists
1st place, gold medalist(s)		Charles Daniels	United States
2nd place, silver medalist(s)		Francis Gailey	Australia
3rd place, bronze medalist(s)		Emil Rausch	Germany

The men's 220 yard freestyle was a swimming event held as part of the Swimming at the 1904 Summer Olympics programme. It was the second time the event was held at the Olympics, though the only time yards were used instead of metres. The length of 220 yards (201.168 metres) was slightly longer than the 200 metres that had been held at the 1900 Summer Olympics and that would return at the 1968 Summer Olympics. It was held on 6 September in a man-made lake in Forest Park. 4 swimmers from 3 nations competed. The event was won by Charles Daniels of the United States. Francis Gailey of Australia took silver, while Emil Rausch of Germany earned bronze. It was the first medal in the 200 metre/220 yard freestyle for each of the United States and Germany; Australia had received gold in 1900 (by Frederick Lane).

== Background ==
This was the second appearance of the 200 metre/220 yard freestyle event. It was first contested in 1900. It would be contested a second time, though at 220 yards, in 1904. After that, the event did not return until 1968; since then, it has been on the programme at every Summer Games.

None of the competitors from the 1900 Games returned.

All three of the competing nations were making their second appearance, having previously competed in 1900.

== Competition format ==
The event was held as a single race. Any stroke could be used.

== Records ==
The standing world and Olympic records (both for 200 metres) prior to this competition were as follows. Ruberl's Olympic record was set with assistance from the current of the Seine, as the swimming events in 1900 were swum downstream in that river.

200 metres
World record	Frederick Lane (AUS)	2:28.6	Weston-super-Mare, United Kingdom of Great Britain and Ireland	18 August 1902
Olympic record	Karl Ruberl (HUN)	2:22.6*	Paris, France	11 August 1900

No new world or Olympic records were set during the competition.

== Schedule ==
Date	Time	Round
Tuesday, 6 September 1904		Final

== Results ==
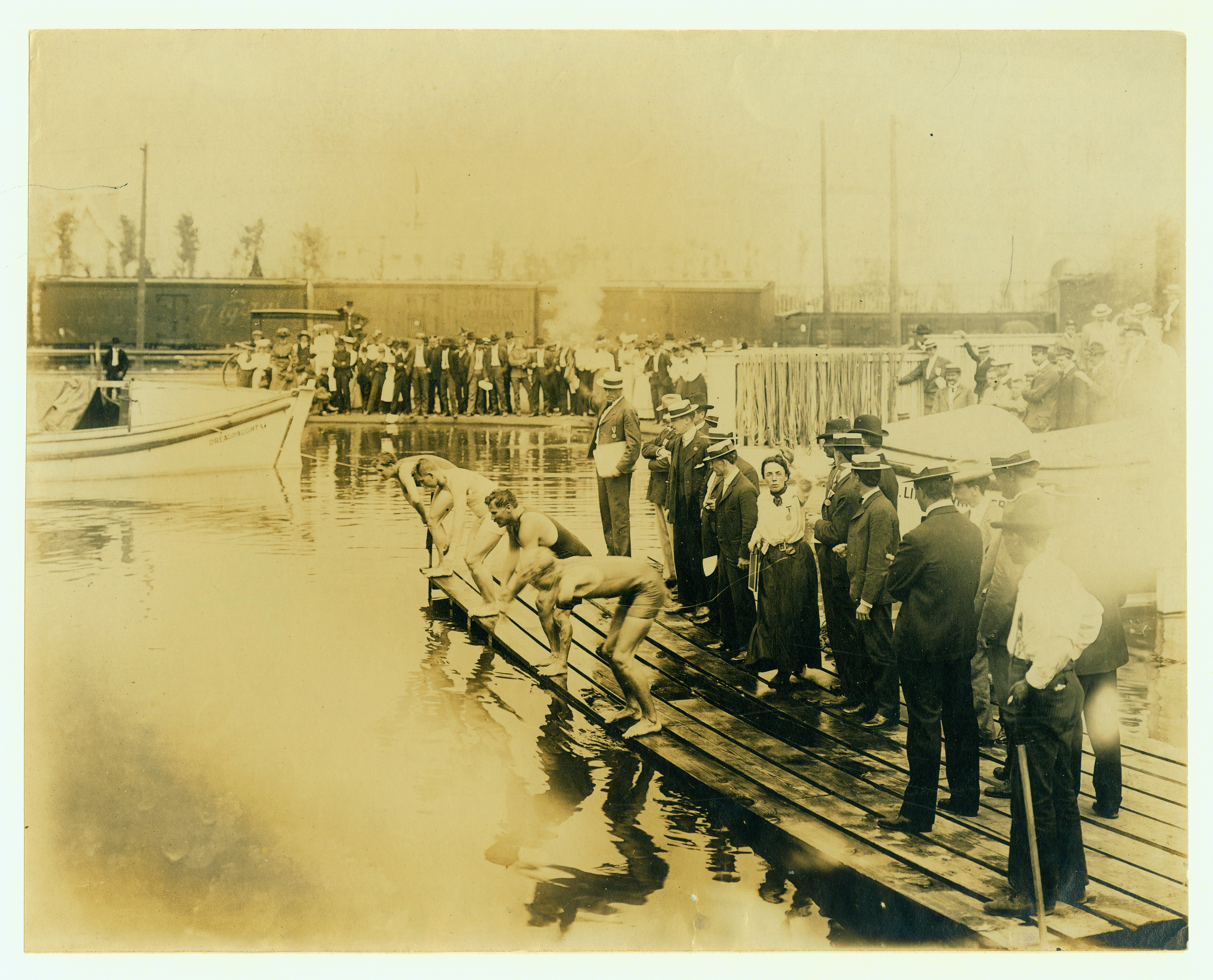
The start of the race

Rank	Swimmer	Nation	Time	Notes
1st place, gold medalist(s)	Charles Daniels	United States	2:44.2	
2nd place, silver medalist(s)	Francis Gailey	Australia	2:46.0	
3rd place, bronze medalist(s)	Emil Rausch	Germany	2:56.0	
4	Edgar Adams	United States	Unknown	

== Sources ==
- Wudarski, Pawel (1999). "Wyniki Igrzysk Olimpijskich" (in Polish).
