= Emil Rausch =

German swimmer (1883–1954)

Personal information
- Born: 11 September 1883 Berlin, German Empire
- Died: 14 December 1954 (aged 71) West Berlin, West Germany

Sport
- Sport: Swimming
Medal record
Representing Germany
Olympic Games
Gold medal – first place	1904 St. Louis	880 yard freestyle
Gold medal – first place	1904 St. Louis	1 mile freestyle
Bronze medal – third place	1904 St. Louis	220 yard freestyle
Intercalated Games
Silver medal – second place	1906 Athens	4×250 m freestyle relay

Emil A. Rausch (11 September 1883 – 14 December 1954) was a German freestyle swimmer who competed in the 1904 Summer Olympics and 1906 Intercalated Games.

In the 1904 Olympics, he won gold medals in the 880 yard freestyle and 1 mile freestyle and a bronze medal in the 220 yard freestyle. Two years later, he won a silver medal as a member of German 4x250 m relay team and was fifth in 1 mile freestyle.

== See also ==
- List of members of the International Swimming Hall of Fame
