= Géza Kiss =

Hungarian swimmer (1882–1952)

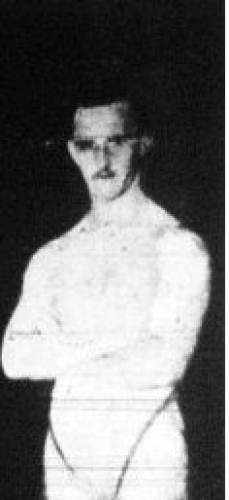

Personal information
- Born: October 22, 1882 Salgótarján, Austria-Hungary
- Died: August 23, 1952 (aged 69) Budapest, Hungary

Sport
- Sport: Swimming
Medal record
Representing Hungary
Olympic Games
Silver medal – second place	1904 St. Louis	1 mile freestyle
Bronze medal – third place	1904 St. Louis	880 yard freestyle
Intercalated Games
Gold medal – first place	1906 Athens	4×250 m freestyle relay

Géza Kiss (born Géza Klein; 22 October 1882 – 23 August 1952) was a Hungarian freestyle swimmer who competed at the 1904 Summer Olympics and at the 1906 Intercalated Games. At the 1904 Olympics he won a silver medal in the 1 mile freestyle and a bronze medal in the 880 yard freestyle. Two years later, at the Intercalated Games, he won a gold medal as a member of Hungarian 4×250 m freestyle relay.
