= Charles Daniels (swimmer) =

American swimmer (1885–1973)

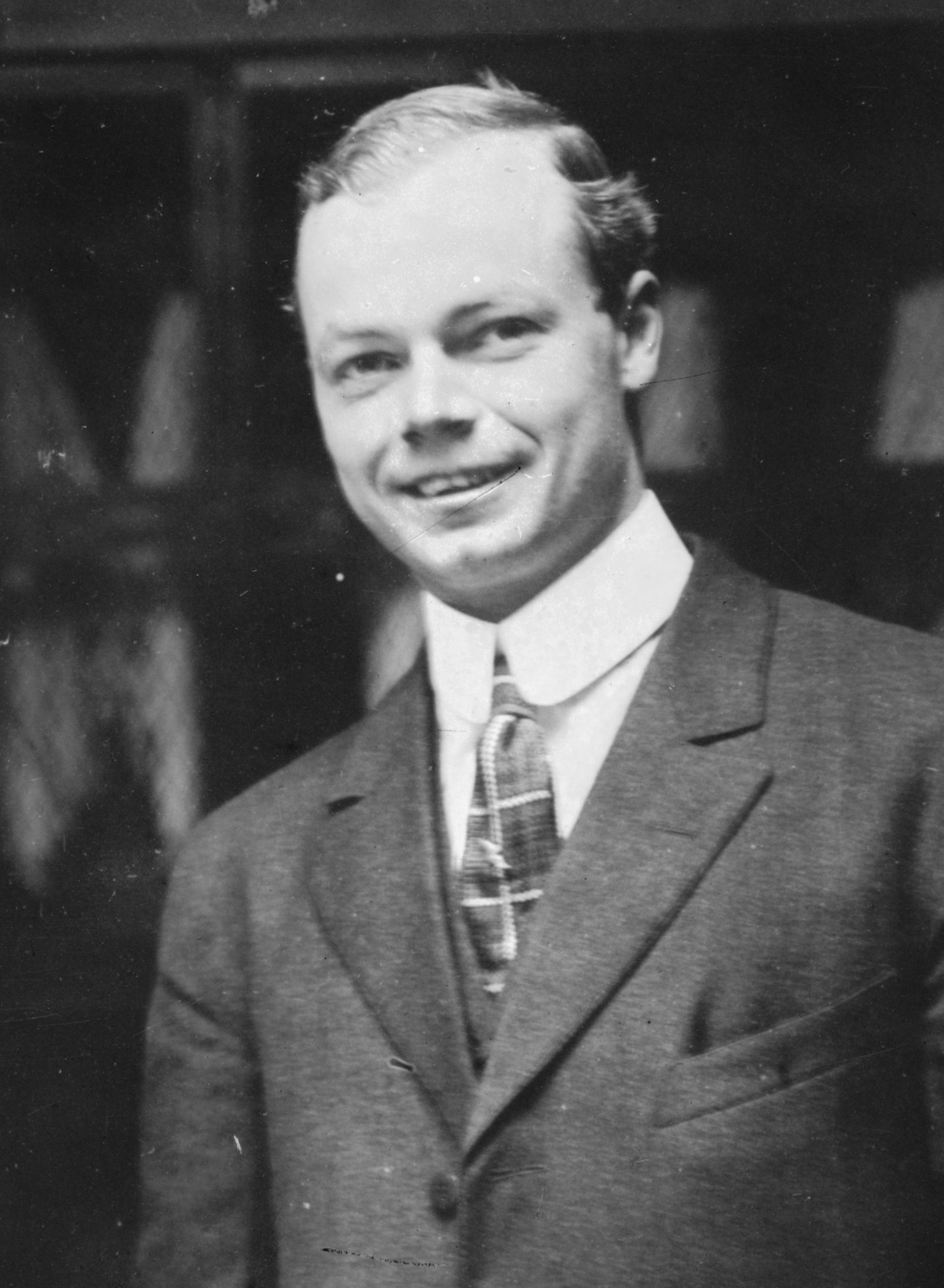

Personal information
- Full name: Charles Meldrum Daniels
- Nickname: "Charlie"
- National team: United States
- Born: March 24, 1885 Dayton, Ohio, U.S.
- Died: August 9, 1973 (aged 88) Carmel Valley Village, California, U.S.
- Height: 6 ft 0 in (1.83 m)
- Weight: 154 lb (70 kg)
- Spouse: Florence Goodyear Daniels

Sport
- Sport: Swimming
- Strokes: Freestyle
- Club: New York Athletic Club
- Coach: Gus Sundstrom (NYAC)
Medal record
Men's swimming
Representing the United States
Olympic Games
Gold medal – first place	1904 St. Louis	220 yd freestyle
Gold medal – first place	1904 St. Louis	440 yd freestyle
Gold medal – first place	1904 St. Louis	4x50 yd freestyle
Gold medal – first place	1908 London	100 m freestyle
Silver medal – second place	1904 St. Louis	100 yd freestyle
Bronze medal – third place	1904 St. Louis	50 yd freestyle
Bronze medal – third place	1908 London	4x200 m freestyle
Intercalated Games
Gold medal – first place	1906 Athens	100 m freestyle

Charles Meldrum Daniels (March 24, 1885 – August 9, 1973) was an American competition swimmer, eight-time Olympic medalist, and world record-holder in two freestyle swimming events. Daniels was an innovator of the front crawl swimming style, helping to develop the "American crawl".

Daniels was born in Dayton, Ohio on March 24, 1885. He attended Dwight Prep school in New York City where he was captain of the school's basketball team, did the high jump, and ran the mile and half mile with the track team. Familiar with strong swimming, Charles's father Thomas often swam a half mile out to sea when the family vacationed in Long Island.

== NYAC and swimming highlights ==
Daniels began his swimming career around the age of 18 with the New York Athletic Club (NYAC) in 1903, where he was mentored by Hall of Fame Coach Gus Sundstrom. At NYAC, Daniels was also a squash and bridge champion. Swimmers of his era had been swimming the trudgen stroke that featured both arms fully extended in front of the body while stroking in turn, but used a breastroke style kick with each stroke cycle. He transitioned from the trudgen stroke to the modern, universally accepted front crawl, also known as the Australian crawl, which used a more efficient and faster flutter kick and made it easier to rotate slightly to breathe and gain more power during arm strokes. The flutter kick produced less drag and could be performed more times per arm cycle than the breaststroke kick.

He helped develop the crawl technique by increasing the number of kicks per arm cycle to around six and rapidly regained his preeminence, soon breaking numerous records. In his career, Daniels captured freestyle world records in all distances from 25-yards to one mile. From 1907-11, he established seven world records of several distances in three countries. The new crawl style was referred to by many as the American Crawl. Daniels' Coach Gus Sundstrom was the first swimming instructor and director at NYAC and served from 1885-1935. According to swimming lore, Sundstrom studied the technique of the American Indian Big Red Fish who used an overarm stroke with a thrashing kick, to improve on the Australian crawl.

From 1904 until he retired in 1911, he won Amateur Athletic Union Championships 31 times. In 1905, he posted 14 world records in a four day period.

== Olympics ==
=== 1904 St. Louis ===
At the 1904 Olympics in St. Louis, Missouri, he became the first American to win a gold in an Olympic games swimming event. He captured the gold medal in the 220-yard freestyle with a time of 2:44.2, finishing ahead of American Frank Gailey by only 2 seconds. In the 440-yard freestyle event he finished first for the gold in 6:16.2, finishing ahead of American teammates Frank Gailey and Otto Walle for an American sweep.

In team competition, he won a gold representing the New York Athletic Club in the 4x50-yard freestyle relay which finished first with a combined time of 2:04.6, defeating the Chicago Athletic Association who took the silver and the Missouri Athletic Club who took the bronze. He took a silver in the 100-yard freestyle, one of his signature events, where he finished a somewhat disappointing second to Zoltan Halmay of Hungary.

=== 1908 London ===
Four years later, at the 1908 Olympics in London, Daniels won gold in the 100-meter freestyle with a world record time of 1:05.6, defeating former rival Zoltan Halmay of Hungary, who touched six-tenths of a second after him to take the silver, and Harald Julin of Switzerland who took the bronze. Daniels caught Zolmay at the 30-meter mark, but never had a commanding lead. Both Daniels and Halmay broke the prior world record, though Zolmay was the early favorite, having set the Olympic record three years earlier in December, 1905.

Daniels also took a bronze in the 1908 Olympics in the 4x200-meter freestyle relay with a combined team time of 11:02.8.

=== Intercalated Games ===
In the 1906 Intercalated Games in Falirou, Peiraias, Athens, Greece, Daniels won the gold in the 100-meter freestyle with a final time of 1:13.0, touching before old rival Zoltan Halmay of Hungary. The Intercalated Games were an international meet held prior to determining the Olympics would be held every four years, and were considered by much of the press to be the same as the Olympics. The U.S. team placed fourth in the 250-meter freestyle relay. The race distance was discontinued as an Olympic relay event, and the 1906 event was held in open water in a bay with high waves.

On June 8, 1909, Daniels married Florence Goodyear Wagner, formerly Florence Goodyear at New York's Plaza Hotel. Florence was wealthy and had obtained a divorce from George Olds Wagner in Paris in March of 1908. She was the daughter of Frank H. Goodyear, a former President of the Buffalo and Susquehanna Railroad.

=== Post-swimming life ===
Daniels retired from competitive swimming in 1910, and he and his wife Florence bought 5,000 acres in New York's Adirondacks mountain range. He had Sabattis Park constructed, which featured a 9-hole golf course for his personal use. After several prior business ventures, he founded and operated one of the few silver fox farms in America, on his land in the Adirondacks.

He moved to the greater Monterey, California area in the late 1930's. In the 1940's, as a Lieutenant in the Navy during WWII, he taught swimming at the United States Maritime Officer's School in Alameda, California. He enjoyed hunting, was an excellent rifle shot, and travelled the world in search of big game, later filling his estate with animal head trophies. An expert in stocks and bonds, he was present with the Dawes Reparation Commission following the first World War. He retained his skills as a Bridgemaster, and continued to swim frequently into his 50's.

In both 1946 and 1948, he captured the California State Seniors championship as an amateur golfer.

=== Honors ===
Daniels was inducted into the International Swimming Hall of Fame as an "Honor Swimmer" in 1965. He was named Athlete of the Year in 1909 by the Amateur Athletic Union.

== Personal life ==
Daniels and his wife, Gladys Landis, had a daughter and two sons. Following a long illness, Daniels died August 9, 1973 at his home in Carmel Valley, California, and was buried near where he spent much of his life at Forest Lawn Cemetery in Buffalo, New York.

== See also ==
- List of members of the International Swimming Hall of Fame
- List of multiple Olympic gold medalists
- List of multiple Olympic gold medalists at a single Games
- List of multiple Olympic medalists at a single Games
- World record progression 100 metres freestyle
- World record progression 200 metres freestyle
