= List of medal sweeps in Olympic athletics =

A podium sweep is when one team wins all available medals in a single event in a sporting event. At the highest level, that would be when one nation wins all the medals in the Summer Olympics Athletics. Many Olympic sports or events do not allow three entries into a single event in the Olympics, making a sweep impossible. But in Athletics (excluding relays) the maximum for a single country is three.

In the beginning, before the Olympics became a global event, sweeps were more common amongst fewer competing countries and larger numbers of entries from a single country. After the 1908 Olympics, a sweep became an increasingly treasured status symbol of national dominance in an event. 1964 was the first Olympiad to have no sweeps. Since then there were no sweeps in 1972, 1996 and 2000.

Sweeps have happened in every long term event in the individual program, except the 5000 metres. It has happened eight times in the 200 metres and 110 metres hurdles, seven in the Shot Put. A steeplechase event has had a sweep five times, by four countries.

Ray Ewry led 5 sweeps, including three from 1904, with Irving Baxter, Charles King and Joseph Stadler joining him in two each and Robert Garrett in one, plus adding a different sweep in 1900. That other sweep joined Josiah McCracken who was part of a different sweep. Ellery Clark, Robert Garrett and James Connolly swept two events together in 1896. Archie Hahn, Nate Cartmell and William Hogenson duplicated that in 1904. More recently, Carl Lewis has led three Olympic sweeps, Mike Powell has finished behind him in two. Yuriy Sedykh, Glenn Davis and Lee Calhoun have also led two sweeps, Sedykh later a participant in a third in 1988 that involved a reordering of the same three from 1980. Shelly-Ann Fraser-Pryce led the Jamaican 100m sweep in 2008 and participated in the 2020 Tokyo 100m sweep, with a silver.

== Men ==
Olympiad	Event	Country	Gold	Silver	Bronze	Source
1896; Athens	High jump	United States	Ellery Clark 1.81 m OR	James Connolly 1.65 m	none awarded	
1896; Athens	High jump	United States	Ellery Clark 1.81 m OR	Robert Garrett 1.65 m	none awarded	
1896; Athens	Long jump	United States	Ellery Clark 6.35 m OR	Robert Garrett 6.00 m	James Connolly 5.84 m	
1900; Paris	110 metres hurdles	United States	Alvin Kraenzlein 15.4 s OR	John McLean at 3 yards	Frederick Moloney at 1 foot	
1900; Paris	4000 metres steeplechase	Great Britain	John Rimmer 12:58.4	Charles Bennett 12:58.6	Sidney Robinson 12:58.8	
1900; Paris	Triple jump	United States	Myer Prinstein 14.47 m	James Connolly 13.97 m	Lewis Sheldon 13.64 m	
1900; Paris	Standing triple jump	United States	Ray Ewry 10.58 m	Irving Baxter 9.95 m	Robert Garrett 9.50 m	
1900; Paris	Standing high jump	United States	Ray Ewry 1.655 m	Irving Baxter 1.525 m	Lewis Sheldon 1.500 m	
1900; Paris	Shot put	United States	Richard Sheldon 14.10 m	Josiah McCracken 12.85 m	Robert Garrett 12.37 m	
1900; Paris	Hammer throw	United States	John Flanagan 51.01 m	Truxtun Hare 46.26 m	Josiah McCracken 43.58 m	
1904; St. Louis	60 metres	United States	Archie Hahn 7.0 s	William Hogenson 7.2 s	Fay Moulton 7.2 s	
1904; St. Louis	100 metres	United States	Archie Hahn 11.0 s	Nate Cartmell 11.2 s	William Hogenson 11.2 s	
1904; St. Louis	200 metres	United States	Archie Hahn 21.6 s	Nate Cartmell 21.9 s	William Hogenson	
1904; St. Louis	400 metres	United States	Harry Hillman 49.2 s	Frank Waller 49.9 s	Herman Groman 50.0 s	
1904; St. Louis	800 metres	United States	James Lightbody 1:56.0	Howard Valentine 1:56.3	Emil Breitkreutz 1:56.4	
1904; St. Louis	1500 metres	United States	James Lightbody 4:05.4	Frank Verner 4:06.8	Lacey Hearn	
1904; St. Louis	Marathon	United States	Thomas Hicks 3:28:53	Albert Corey 3:34:52*	Arthur Newton 3:47:33	
1904; St. Louis	110 metres hurdles	United States	Fred Schule 16.0 s	Thaddeus Shideler 16.3 s	Lesley Ashburner 16.4 s	
1904; St. Louis	200 metres hurdles	United States	Harry Hillman 24.6 s	Frank Castleman 24.9 s	George Poage	
1904; St. Louis	400 metres hurdles	United States	Harry Hillman 53.0 s	Frank Waller 53.2 s	George Poage 56.8 s	
1904; St. Louis	Long jump	United States	Myer Prinstein 7.34 m	Daniel Frank 6.89 m	Robert Stangland 6.88 m	
1904; St. Louis	Triple jump	United States	Myer Prinstein 14.35 m	Fred Englehardt 13.90 m	Robert Stangland 13.36 m	
1904; St. Louis	Pole vault	United States	Charles Dvorak	LeRoy Samse	Louis Wilkins	
1904; St. Louis	Standing long jump	United States	Ray Ewry	Charles King	John Biller	
1904; St. Louis	Standing triple jump	United States	Ray Ewry	Charles King	Joseph Stadler	
1904; St. Louis	Standing high jump	United States	Ray Ewry	Joseph Stadler	Lawson Robertson	
1904; St. Louis	Shot put	United States	Ralph Rose	Wesley Coe	Lawrence Feuerbach	
1904; St. Louis	Hammer throw	United States	John Flanagan	John DeWitt	Ralph Rose	
1904; St. Louis	Triathlon	United States	Max Emmerich	John Grieb	William Merz	
1908; London	110 metres hurdles	United States	Forrest Smithson 15.0 WR	John Garrels 15.7	Arthur Shaw 15.8	
1908; London	10 miles walk	Great Britain	George Larner 1:15:57.4 WR	Ernest Webb 1:17:31.0	Edward Spencer 1:21:20.2	
1908; London	Discus throw	United States	Martin Sheridan 40.89 m OR	Merritt Giffin 40.70 m	Bill Horr 39.45 m	
1912; Stockholm	100 metres	United States	Ralph Craig	Alvah Meyer	Donald Lippincott	
1912; Stockholm	800 metres	United States	Ted Meredith	Mel Sheppard	Ira Davenport	
1912; Stockholm	110 metres hurdles	United States	Fred Kelly	James Wendell	Martin Hawkins	
1912; Stockholm	Triple jump	Sweden	Gustaf Lindblom	Georg Åberg	Erik Almlöf	
1912; Stockholm	Shot put	United States	Pat McDonald	Ralph Rose	Lawrence Whitney	
1912; Stockholm	Two handed javelin throw	Finland	Julius Saaristo	Väinö Siikaniemi	Urho Peltonen	
1920; Antwerp	Javelin throw	Finland	Jonni Myyrä	Urho Peltonen	Pekka Johansson	
1920; Antwerp	400 metres hurdles	United States	Frank Loomis	John Norton	August Desch	
1924; Paris	Pole vault	United States	Lee Barnes	Glenn Graham	James Brooker	
1924; Paris	Shot put	United States	Bud Houser	Glenn Hartranft	Ralph Hills	
1928; Amsterdam	3000 metres steeplechase	Finland	Toivo Loukola 9:21.8 WR	Paavo Nurmi 9:31.2	Ove Andersen 9:35.6	
1928; Amsterdam	Pole vault	United States	Sabin Carr 4.20	William Droegemuller 4.10	Charles McGinnis 3.95	
1932; Los Angeles	200 meters	United States	Eddie Tolan 21.2	George Simpson 21.4	Ralph Metcalfe 21.5	
1932; Los Angeles	Javelin throw	Finland	Matti Järvinen 72.71 m	Matti Sippala 69.80 m	Eino Penttilä 68.70 m	
1936; Berlin	10,000 metres	Finland	Ilmari Salminen 30:15.4	Arvo Askola 30:15.6	Volmari Iso-Hollo 30:20.2	
1936; Berlin	High jump	United States	Cornelius Johnson 2.03 m	Dave Albritton 2.00 m	Delos Thurber 2.00 m	
1936; Berlin	Decathlon	United States	Glenn Morris 7900	Bob Clark 7601	Jack Parker 7275	
1948; London	110 metres hurdles	United States	William Porter 13.9	Clyde Scott 14.1	Craig Dixon 14.1	
1948; London	3000 metres steeplechase	Sweden	Tore Sjöstrand 9:04.6	Erik Elmsäter 9:08.2	Göte Hagström 9:11.8	
1948; London	Shot put	United States	Wilbur Thompson 17.12 m	Jim Delaney 16.68 m	Jim Fuchs 16.42 m	
1952; Helsinki	200 metres	United States	Andy Stanfield 20.7	Thane Baker 20.8	James Gathers 20.8	
1952; Helsinki	110 metres hurdles	United States	Harrison Dillard 13.7	Jack Davis 13.7	Arthur Barnard 14.1	
1952; Helsinki	Shot put	United States	Parry O'Brien 17.41 m	Darrow Hooper 17.39 m	Jim Fuchs 17.06 m	
1952; Helsinki	Decathlon	United States	Bob Mathias 7,887 pts	Milt Campbell 6,975 pts	Floyd Simmons 6,788 pts	
1956; Melbourne	200 metres	United States	Bobby Morrow 20.6 (OR)	Andy Stanfield 20.7	Thane Baker 20.9	
1956; Melbourne	110 metres hurdles	United States	Lee Calhoun 13.5 (OR)	Jack Davis 13.5 (OR)	Joel Shankle 14.1	
1956; Melbourne	400 metres hurdles	United States	Glenn Davis 50.1 (=OR)	Eddie Southern 50.8	Joshua Culbreath 51.6	
1956; Melbourne	20 kilometres walk	Soviet Union	Leonid Spirin 1:31:27.4	Antanas Mikėnas 1:32:03.0	Bruno Junk 1:32:12.0	
1956; Melbourne	Discus throw	United States	Al Oerter 56.36 m (OR)	Fortune Gordien 54.81 m	Desmond Koch 54.40 m	
1960; Rome	110 metres hurdles	United States	Lee Calhoun 13.8	William May 13.8	Hayes Jones 14.0	
1960; Rome	400 metres hurdles	United States	Glenn Davis 49.3 (OR)	Clifton Cushman 49.6	Dick Howard 49.7	
1960; Rome	Shot put	United States	Bill Nieder 19.68 m (OR)	Parry O'Brien 19.11 m	Dallas Long 19.01 m	
1960; Rome	Discus throw	United States	Al Oerter 59.18 m (OR)	Rink Babka 58.02 m	Dick Cochran 57.16 m	
1968; Mexico City	400 metres	United States	Lee Evans 43.86 (WR)	Larry James 43.97	Ron Freeman 44.41	
1976; Montreal	Hammer throw	Soviet Union	Yuriy Sedykh 77.52 m	Aleksey Spiridonov 76.08 m	Anatoliy Bondarchuk 75.48 m	
1980; Moscow	Hammer throw	Soviet Union	Yuriy Sedykh 81.80 m WR	Sergey Litvinov 80.64 m	Jüri Tamm 78.96 m	
1984; Los Angeles	200 metres	United States	Carl Lewis 19.80 OR	Kirk Baptiste 19.96	Thomas Jefferson 20.26	
1988; Seoul	400 metres	United States	Steve Lewis 43.87	Butch Reynolds 43.93	Danny Everett 44.09	
1988; Seoul	Long jump	United States	Carl Lewis 8.72 m	Mike Powell 8.49 m	Larry Myricks 8.27 m	
1988; Seoul	Pole vault	Soviet Union	Sergey Bubka 5.90 m	Radion Gataullin 5.85 m	Grigoriy Yegorov 5.80 m	
1988; Seoul	Hammer throw	Soviet Union	Sergey Litvinov 84.80 m OR	Yuriy Sedykh 83.76 m	Jüri Tamm 81.16 m	
1992; Barcelona	3000 metres steeplechase	Kenya	Matthew Birir 8:08.84	Patrick Sang 8:09.55	William Mutwol 8:10.74	
1992; Barcelona	Long jump	United States	Carl Lewis 8.67 m	Mike Powell 8.64 m	Joe Greene 8.34 m	
1992; Barcelona	Hammer throw	Unified Team	Andrey Abduvaliyev 82.54 m	Igor Astapkovich 81.96 m	Igor Nikulin 81.38 m	
2004; Athens	200 metres	United States	Shawn Crawford 19.79	Bernard Williams 20.01	Justin Gatlin 20.03	
2004; Athens	400 metres	United States	Jeremy Wariner 44.00	Otis Harris 44.16	Derrick Brew 44.42	
2004; Athens	3000 metres steeplechase	Kenya	Ezekiel Kemboi 8:05.81	Brimin Kipruto 8:06.11	Paul Kipsiele Koech 8:06.64	
2008; Beijing	400 metres	United States	LaShawn Merritt 43.75	Jeremy Wariner 44.74	David Neville 44.80	
2008; Beijing	400 metres hurdles	United States	Angelo Taylor 47.25	Kerron Clement 47.98	Bershawn Jackson 48.06	
2012; London	200 metres	Jamaica	Usain Bolt 19.32	Yohan Blake 19.44	Warren Weir 19.84	

== Women ==
In women's sports, sweeps have only occurred 10 times. The Pentathlon and the 100 metres are the only events to have more than one occurrence.

Olympiad	Event	Country	Gold	Silver	Bronze
1952; Helsinki	Discus throw	Soviet Union	Nina Romashkova 51.42 m	Elizaveta Bagryantseva 47.08 m	Nina Dumbadze 46.29 m
1976; Montreal	Pentathlon	East Germany	Siegrun Siegl 4745	Christine Laser 4745	Burglinde Pollak 4740
1980; Moscow	800 metres	Soviet Union	Nadiya Olizarenko 1:53.43 WR	Olga Mineeva 1:54.81	Tatyana Providokhina 1:55.46
1980; Moscow	Pentathlon	Soviet Union	Nadiya Tkachenko 5083 WR	Olga Rukavishnikova 4937	Olga Kuragina 4875
1988 Seoul	Fencing (foil) details	West Germany	Anja Fichtel	Sabine Bau	Zita Funkenhauser
2004; Athens	Long jump	Russia	Tatyana Lebedeva 7.07 m	Irina Simagina 7.05 m	Tatyana Kotova 7.05 m
2008; Beijing	100 metres	Jamaica	Shelly-Ann Fraser 10.78	Sherone Simpson 10.98	none awarded
2008; Beijing	100 metres	Jamaica	Shelly-Ann Fraser 10.78	Kerron Stewart 10.98	none awarded
2012; London	20 kilometres walk	China	Qieyang Shenjie 1:25:16 OR	Liu Hong 1:26:00	Lü Xiuzhi 1:27:10
2016; Rio de Janeiro	100 metre hurdles	United States	Brianna Rollins 12.48	Nia Ali 12.59	Kristi Castlin 12.61
2020; Tokyo	100 metres	Jamaica	Elaine Thompson-Herah 10.61 OR	Shelly-Ann Fraser-Pryce 10.74	Shericka Jackson 10.76

== See also ==
- Olympic sweeps in speed skating
- List of medal sweeps at the World Championships in Athletics
