= 800 metres at the Olympics =

800 metres at the Olympic Games
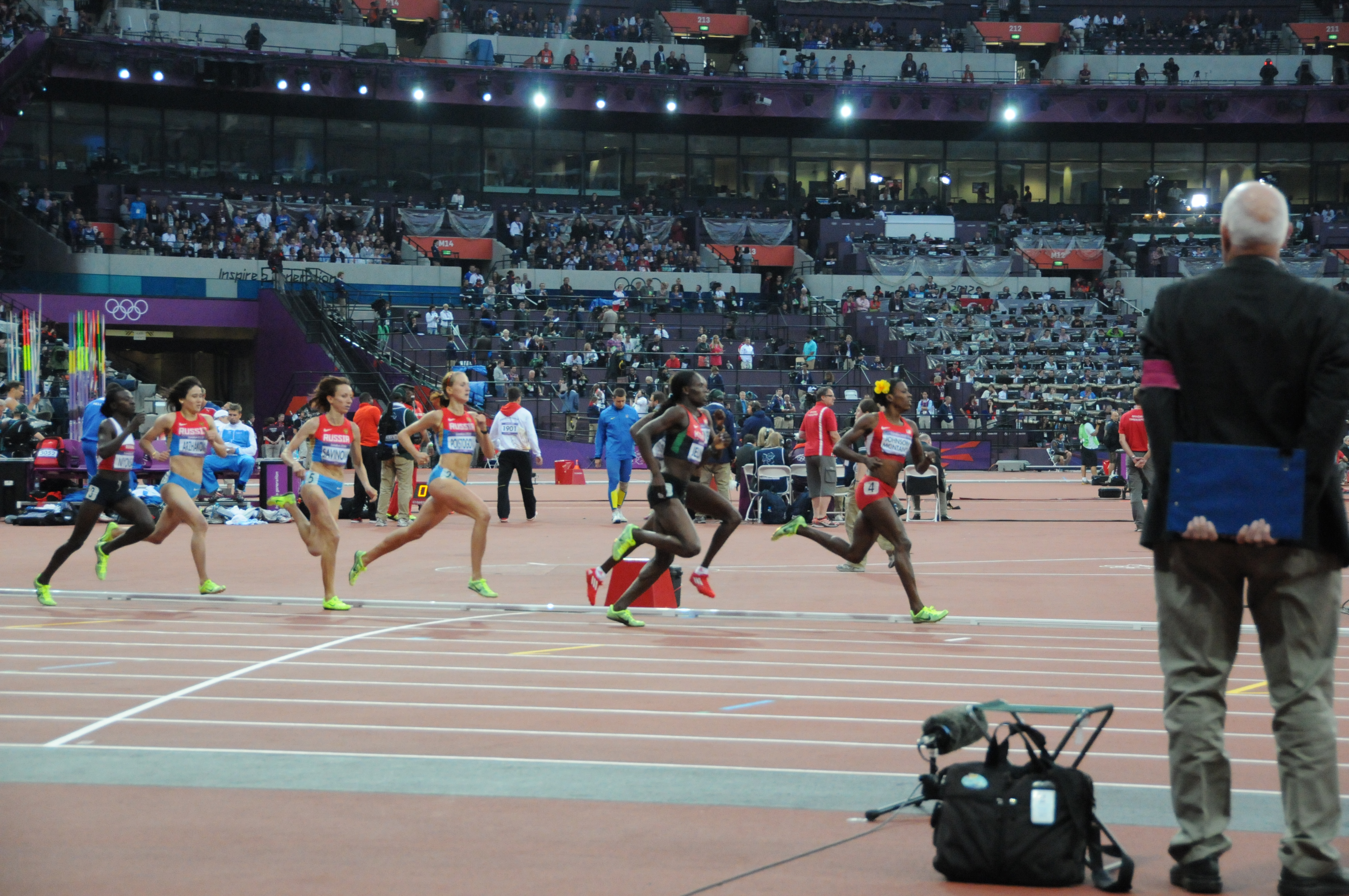
- The 2012 Olympic women's 800 m final

Overview
- Sport: Athletics
- Gender: Men and women
- Years held: Men: 1896–2024; Women: 1928, 1960 –2024

Olympic record
- Men: David Rudisha (KEN) 1:40.91 (2012)
- Women: Nadezhda Olizarenko (URS) 1:53.43 (1980)

Reigning champion
- Men: Emmanuel Wanyonyi (KEN)
- Women: Keely Hodgkinson (GBR)

The 800 metres at the Summer Olympics has been contested since the first edition of the multi-sport event. The men's 800 m has been present on the Olympic athletics programme since 1896. The women's event was first held in 1928, making it the first distance running event for women. The women's race was not held again until 1960; it has been a permanent fixture since. It is the most prestigious 800 m race at elite level. The competition format typically has three rounds: a qualifying round, semi-final stage, and a final between eight runners.

The Olympic records are held by David Rudisha, who ran a world record of 1:40.91 minutes in 2012, and Nadiya Olizarenko, who ran a former world record of 1:53.43 minutes in 1980. Olizarenko's mark is the joint longest-standing women's Olympic record (technically set three days after Ilona Slupianek's shot put record) and the joint second-longest overall after the men's long jump record by Bob Beamon. Her time remains the second fastest ever for the event. The 800 metres world record has been broken or equalled ten times at the Olympics; the men's record was broken in 1912, 1932, 1968, 1976 and 2012; the women's record was improved in 1928, 1960, 1964, 1976 and 1980.

Four men have won consecutive 800 m Olympic titles: Douglas Lowe (1924/1928), Mal Whitfield (1948/1952), Peter Snell (1960/1964), and Rudisha (2012/2016). Only Caster Semenya (2012/2016) has won the women's title twice, but Maria Mutola, Kelly Holmes, Pamela Jelimo and Keely Hodgkinson have won gold and reached the podium twice. No athlete of either sex has won more than two medals. Historically, athletes in this event have also been successful at the 1500 metres at the Olympics. Holmes was the last athlete to win both events at the same Olympics in 2004. 2012 1500m gold medalist Taoufik Makhloufi made both podiums without winning gold in 2016. Alberto Juantorena in 1976 also won the 400 metres gold medal in the same Olympics, only three other men and one woman have been able to win a medal in both events.

The United States is the most successful nation, having won 10 gold medals and 26 medals overall, followed by Great Britain with nine gold among its 14 medals and Kenya with eight gold among its 20 medals.

== Medal summary ==
=== Men ===
Games	Gold	Silver	Bronze
1896 Athens	Edwin Flack; Australia	Nándor Dáni; Hungary	Dimitrios Golemis; Greece
1900 Paris	Alfred Tysoe; Great Britain	John Cregan; United States	David Hall; United States
1904 St. Louis	Jim Lightbody; United States	Howard Valentine; United States	Emil Breitkreutz; United States
1908 London	Mel Sheppard; United States	Emilio Lunghi; Italy	Hanns Braun; Germany
1912 Stockholm	Ted Meredith; United States	Mel Sheppard; United States	Ira Davenport; United States
1920 Antwerp	Albert Hill; Great Britain	Earl Eby; United States	Bevil Rudd; South Africa
1924 Paris	Douglas Lowe; Great Britain	Paul Martin; Switzerland	Schuyler Enck; United States
1928 Amsterdam	Douglas Lowe; Great Britain	Erik Byléhn; Sweden	Hermann Engelhard; Germany
1932 Los Angeles	Tommy Hampson; Great Britain	Alex Wilson; Canada	Phil Edwards; Canada
1936 Berlin	John Woodruff; United States	Mario Lanzi; Italy	Phil Edwards; Canada
1948 London	Mal Whitfield; United States	Arthur Wint; Jamaica	Marcel Hansenne; France
1952 Helsinki	Mal Whitfield; United States	Arthur Wint; Jamaica	Heinz Ulzheimer; Germany
1956 Melbourne	Tom Courtney; United States	Derek Johnson; Great Britain	Audun Boysen; Norway
1960 Rome	Peter Snell; New Zealand	Roger Moens; Belgium	George Kerr; British West Indies
1964 Tokyo	Peter Snell; New Zealand	Bill Crothers; Canada	Wilson Kiprugut; Kenya
1968 Mexico City	Ralph Doubell; Australia	Wilson Kiprugut; Kenya	Tom Farrell; United States
1972 Munich	Dave Wottle; United States	Yevhen Arzhanov; Soviet Union	Mike Boit; Kenya
1976 Montreal	Alberto Juantorena; Cuba	Ivo Van Damme; Belgium	Rick Wohlhuter; United States
1980 Moscow	Steve Ovett; Great Britain	Sebastian Coe; Great Britain	Nikolay Kirov; Soviet Union
1984 Los Angeles	Joaquim Cruz; Brazil	Sebastian Coe; Great Britain	Earl Jones; United States
1988 Seoul	Paul Ereng; Kenya	Joaquim Cruz; Brazil	Saïd Aouita; Morocco
1992 Barcelona	William Tanui; Kenya	Nixon Kiprotich; Kenya	Johnny Gray; United States
1996 Atlanta	Vebjørn Rodal; Norway	Hezekiél Sepeng; South Africa	Frederick Onyancha; Kenya
2000 Sydney	Nils Schumann; Germany	Wilson Kipketer; Denmark	Djabir Saïd-Guerni; Algeria
2004 Athens	Yuriy Borzakovskiy; Russia	Mbulaeni Mulaudzi; South Africa	Wilson Kipketer; Denmark
2008 Beijing	Wilfred Bungei; Kenya	Ismail Ahmed Ismail; Sudan	Alfred Kirwa Yego; Kenya
2012 London	David Rudisha; Kenya	Nijel Amos; Botswana	Timothy Kitum; Kenya
2016 Rio de Janeiro	David Rudisha; Kenya	Taoufik Makhloufi; Algeria	Clayton Murphy; United States
2020 Tokyo	Emmanuel Korir; Kenya	Ferguson Rotich; Kenya	Patryk Dobek; Poland
2024 Paris	Emmanuel Wanyonyi; Kenya	Marco Arop; Canada	Djamel Sedjati; Algeria

==== Multiple medalists ====
Rank	Athlete	Nation	Olympics	Gold	Silver	Bronze	Total
1=	Douglas Lowe	Great Britain	1924–1928	2	0	0	2
1=	Mal Whitfield	United States	1948–1952	2	0	0	2
1=	Peter Snell	New Zealand	1960–1964	2	0	0	2
1=	David Rudisha	Kenya	2012-2016	2	0	0	2
5=	Mel Sheppard	United States	1908–1912	1	1	0	2
5=	Joaquim Cruz	Brazil	1984–1988	1	1	0	2
7=	Arthur Wint	Jamaica	1948–1952	0	2	0	2
7=	Sebastian Coe	Great Britain	1980–1984	0	2	0	2
9=	Wilson Kiprugut	Kenya	1964–1968	0	1	1	2
9=	Wilson Kipketer	Denmark	2000–2004	0	1	1	2
11	Phil Edwards	Canada	1932–1936	0	0	2	2

==== Medals by country ====
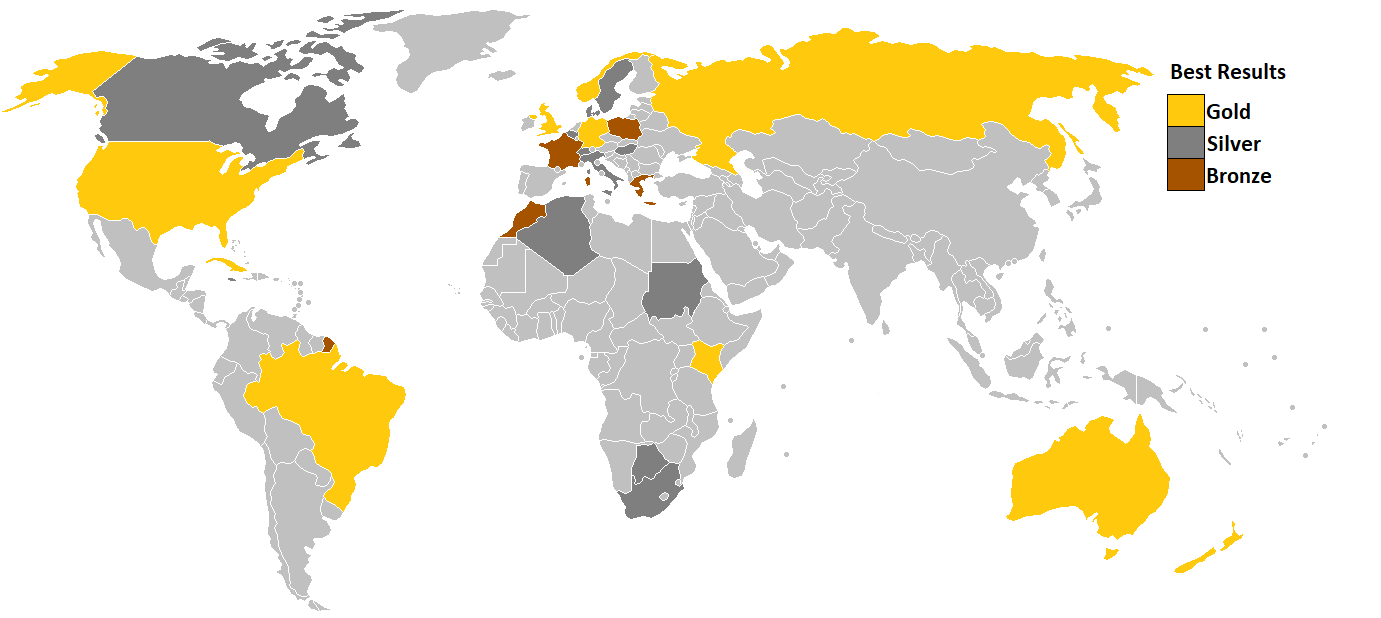
Map of countries' best results – Men's 800 metres

Rank	Nation	Gold	Silver	Bronze	Total
1	United States	8	4	9	21
2	Kenya	7	3	5	15
3	Great Britain	6	3	0	9
4=	Australia	2	0	0	2
4=	New Zealand	2	0	0	2
6	Brazil	1	1	0	2
7	Germany	1	0	3	4
8	Norway	1	0	1	2
9=	Cuba	1	0	0	1
9=	Russia	1	0	0	1
11	Canada	0	2	2	4
12	South Africa	0	2	1	3
13=	Italy	0	2	0	2
13=	Belgium	0	2	0	2
13=	Jamaica	0	2	0	2
16	Algeria	0	1	2	3
17=	Denmark	0	1	1	2
17=	Soviet Union	0	1	1	2
19=	Botswana	0	1	0	1
19=	Hungary	0	1	0	1
19=	Sudan	0	1	0	1
19=	Sweden	0	1	0	1
19=	Switzerland	0	1	0	1
24=	British West Indies	0	0	1	1
24=	France	0	0	1	1
24=	Greece	0	0	1	1
24=	Morocco	0	0	1	1
24=	Poland	0	0	1	1

=== Women ===
Games	Gold	Silver	Bronze
1928 Amsterdam	Lina Radke; Germany	Kinuye Hitomi; Japan	Inga Gentzel; Sweden
1932–1956	not included in the Olympic program		
1960 Rome	Lyudmila Shevtsova; Soviet Union	Brenda Jones; Australia	Ursula Donath; United Team of Germany
1964 Tokyo	Ann Packer; Great Britain	Maryvonne Dupureur; France	Marise Chamberlain; New Zealand
1968 Mexico City	Madeline Manning; United States	Ileana Silai; Romania	Mia Gommers; Netherlands
1972 Munich	Hildegard Falck; West Germany	Nijolė Sabaitė; Soviet Union	Gunhild Hoffmeister; East Germany
1976 Montreal	Tatyana Kazankina; Soviet Union	Nikolina Shtereva; Bulgaria	Elfi Zinn; East Germany
1980 Moscow	Nadezhda Olizarenko; Soviet Union	Olga Mineyeva; Soviet Union	Tatyana Providokhina; Soviet Union
1984 Los Angeles	Doina Melinte; Romania	Kim Gallagher; United States	Fiţa Lovin; Romania
1988 Seoul	Sigrun Wodars; East Germany	Christine Wachtel; East Germany	Kim Gallagher; United States
1992 Barcelona	Ellen van Langen; Netherlands	Liliya Nurutdinova; Unified Team	Ana Fidelia Quirot; Cuba
1996 Atlanta	Svetlana Masterkova; Russia	Ana Fidelia Quirot; Cuba	Maria Mutola; Mozambique
2000 Sydney	Maria Mutola; Mozambique	Stephanie Graf; Austria	Kelly Holmes; Great Britain
2004 Athens	Kelly Holmes; Great Britain	Hasna Benhassi; Morocco	Jolanda Čeplak; Slovenia
2008 Beijing	Pamela Jelimo; Kenya	Janeth Jepkosgei; Kenya	Hasna Benhassi; Morocco
2012 London	Caster Semenya; South Africa	Ekaterina Poistogova; Russia	Pamela Jelimo; Kenya
2016 Rio de Janeiro	Caster Semenya; South Africa	Francine Niyonsaba; Burundi	Margaret Wambui; Kenya
2020 Tokyo	Athing Mu; United States	Keely Hodgkinson; Great Britain	Raevyn Rogers; United States
2024 Paris	Keely Hodgkinson; Great Britain	Tsige Duguma; Ethiopia	Mary Moraa; Kenya

==== Multiple medalists ====
Rank	Athlete	Nation	Olympics	Gold	Silver	Bronze	Total
1	Caster Semenya	South Africa	2012–2016	2	0	0	2
2	Keely Hodgkinson	Great Britain	2020–2024	1	1	0	2
3=	Maria Mutola	Mozambique	1996–2000	1	0	1	2
3=	Kelly Holmes	Great Britain	2000–2004	1	0	1	2
3=	Pamela Jelimo	Kenya	2008–2012	1	0	1	2
5=	Kim Gallagher	United States	1984–1988	0	1	1	2
5=	Ana Fidelia Quirot	Cuba	1992–1996	0	1	1	2
5=	Hasna Benhassi	Morocco	2004–2008	0	1	1	2

==== Medalists by country ====
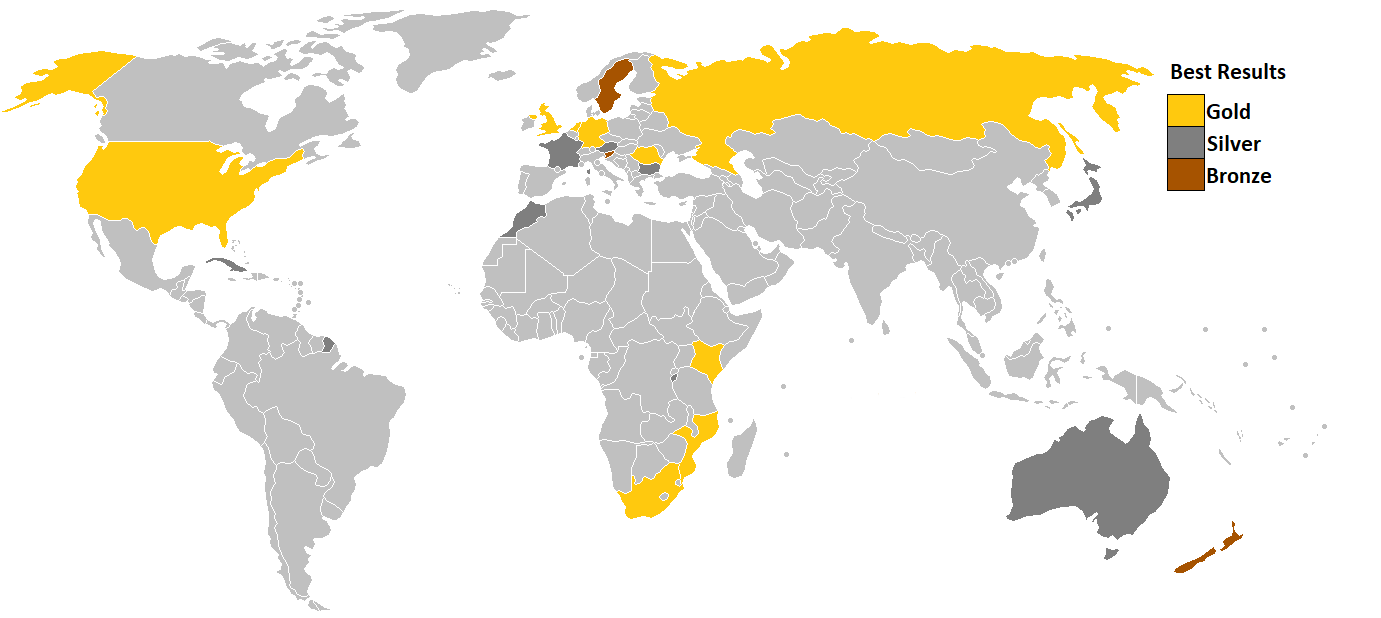
Map of countries' best results – Women's 800 metres

Rank	Nation	Gold	Silver	Bronze	Total
1	Soviet Union	3	2	1	6
2	Great Britain	3	1	1	5
3	United States	2	1	2	5
4	South Africa	2	0	0	2
5	Kenya	1	1	3	5
6	East Germany	1	1	2	4
7	Romania	1	1	1	3
8	Russia	1	1	0	2
9=	Germany^{[nb]}	1	0	1	2
9=	Mozambique	1	0	1	2
9=	Netherlands	1	0	1	2
12=	Morocco	0	1	1	2
12=	Cuba	0	1	1	2
14=	Australia	0	1	0	1
14=	Austria	0	1	0	1
14=	Bulgaria	0	1	0	1
14=	France	0	1	0	1
14=	Japan	0	1	0	1
14=	Unified Team	0	1	0	1
14=	Ethiopia	0	1	0	1
14=	Burundi	0	1	0	1
21=	New Zealand	0	0	1	1
21=	Slovenia	0	0	1	1
21=	Sweden	0	0	1	1

- ^{nb} The German total includes teams both competing as Germany and the United Team of Germany, but not East or West Germany.

== Intercalated Games ==
The 1906 Intercalated Games were held in Athens and at the time were officially recognised as part of the Olympic Games series, with the intention being to hold a games in Greece in two-year intervals between the internationally held Olympics. However, this plan never came to fruition and the International Olympic Committee (IOC) later decided not to recognise these games as part of the official Olympic series. Some sports historians continue to treat the results of these games as part of the Olympic canon.

At this event a men's 800 m was held and Paul Pilgrim, a 1904 Olympic gold medalist in the 4-mile team race, won the competition. The reigning 800 m and 1500 metres champion from the 1904 Olympics, James Lightbody, was the runner-up and Britain's Wyndham Halswelle, later the 1908 Olympic champion, was the bronze medalist.

Games	Gold	Silver	Bronze
1906 Athens	Paul Pilgrim (USA)	James Lightbody (USA)	Wyndham Halswelle (GBR)

== Non-canonical Olympic events ==
In addition to the main 1900 Olympic men's 800 metres, a handicap competition with thirteen entrants was contested three days after the final. Christian Christensen of Denmark was the winner in a time of 1:52.0 minutes with a 70 m handicap. Howard Hayes and Harvey Lord, both of the United States, filled out the top three, with Hayes recording 1:53.5 mins (45 m handicap) and Lord finishing in 1:54.2 minutes (35 m handicap).

A handicap 880-yard run (804.7 m) competition was held at 1904 Summer Olympics after the 1904 Olympic men's 800 m race. Johannes Runge of Germany won in 1:58.4 minutes with a 10-yard handicap. James Peck of Canada came second in 1:59.0 minutes with zero handicap and F. C. Roth, an American schoolboy, was third with a 15-yard headstart.

These events are no longer considered part of the official Olympic history of the 800 metres or the athletics programme in general. Consequently, medals from these competitions have not been assigned to nations on the all-time medal tables.
