= 400 metres at the Olympics =

400 metres at the Olympic Games
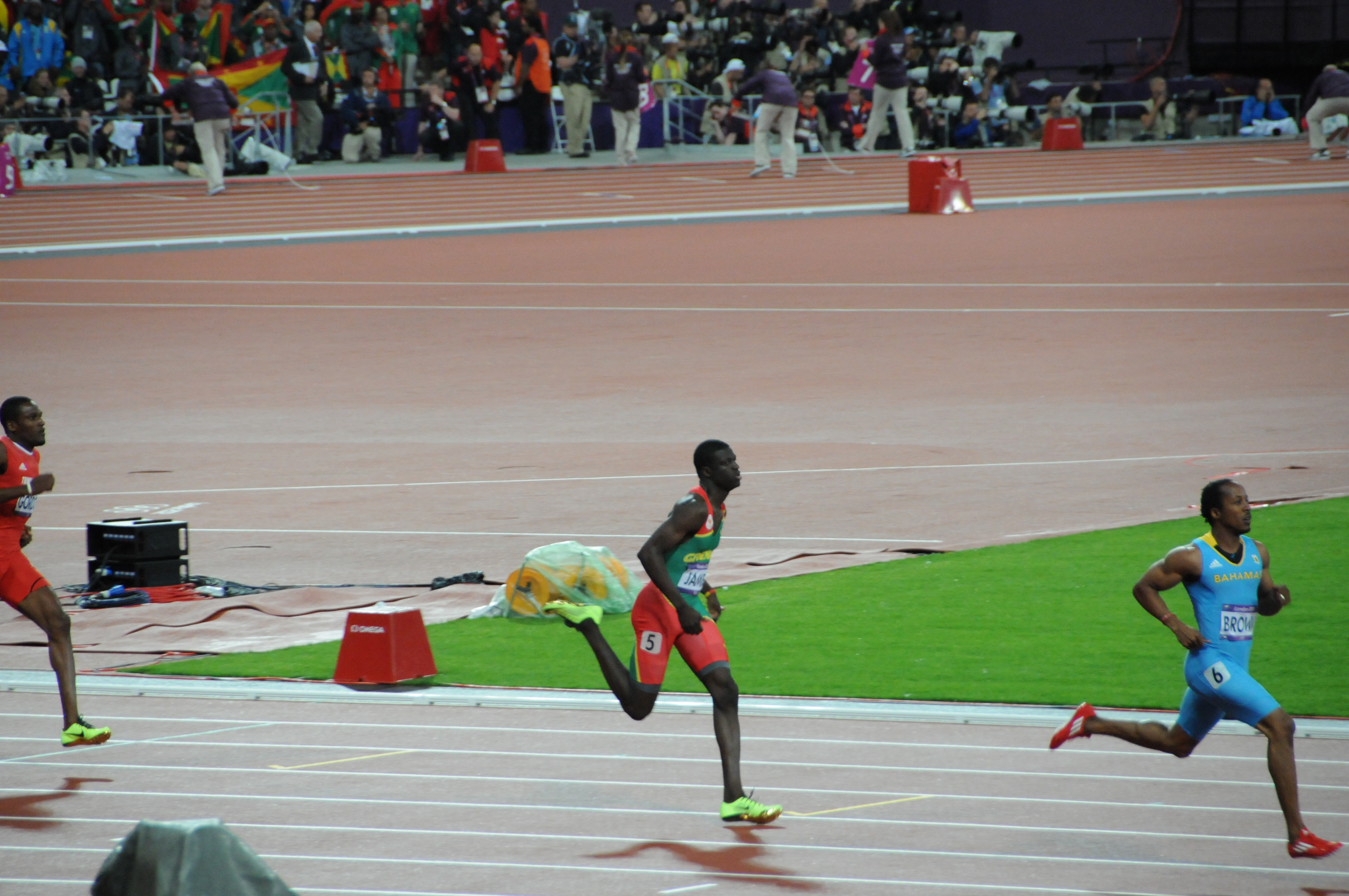
- The 2012 Olympic men's 400 m final

Overview
- Sport: Athletics
- Gender: Men and women
- Years held: Men: 1896–2024; Women: 1964–2024

Olympic record
- Men: Wayde van Niekerk (RSA) 43.03 (2016)
- Women: Marileidy Paulino (DOM) 48.17 (2024)

Reigning champion
- Men: Quincy Hall (USA)
- Women: Marileidy Paulino (DOM)

The 400 metres at the Summer Olympics has been contested since the first edition of the multi-sport event. The men's 400 m has been present on the Olympic athletics programme since 1896 but nearly seventy years passed before the introduction of the women's 400 m, which has been held continuously since the 1964 Games. It is the most prestigious 400 m race at elite level. The competition format typically has two qualifying rounds leading to a final race between eight athletes.

The Olympic record for the men's race was set in 2016, and the record for the women's race was set in 2024. Wayde van Niekerk holds the men's record of 43.03 seconds, breaking world and Olympic records that had been held by Michael Johnson since 1999 and 1996 respectively. Marileidy Paulino is the women's record holder at 48.17 seconds. The men's world record has been broken several times at the Olympics: in 1912, 1932, 1960, 1968, and 2016. Irena Szewińska is the only person to break the women's world record at the competition, doing so in 1976.

Only three athletes have won the event twice: Marie-José Pérec became the first to defend the title in 1996, then Michael Johnson followed with victories in 1996 and 2000, and Shaunae Miller-Uibo successfully defended her 2016 title at Tokyo 2020. No athlete has won more than three medals. Several medalists in the event have also had success in the 200 metres at the Olympics: Johnson, Perec, Szewińska and Valerie Brisco-Hooks have all won titles at both distances. Athletes chosen for the event almost always form part of their nation's team for the 4×400 metres relay at the Olympics.

The United States is the most successful nation in the event, with 21 gold medals and 44 medals in total. The next most successful nation is Great Britain. The 1908 men's 400 metres saw the only walkover in Olympic history, as the American finalists refused to compete in the final in protest of the officiating.

== Medal summary ==
=== Men ===
| Games | Gold | Silver | Bronze |
|---|---|---|---|
| 1896 Athens | Thomas Burke; United States | Herbert Jamison; United States | Charles Gmelin; Great Britain |
| 1900 Paris | Maxie Long; United States | William Holland; United States | Ernst Schultz; Denmark |
| 1904 St. Louis | Harry Hillman; United States | Frank Waller; United States | Herman Groman; United States |
| 1908 London | Wyndham Halswelle; Great Britain | None awarded | None awarded |
| 1912 Stockholm | Charles Reidpath; United States | Hanns Braun; Germany | Edward Lindberg; United States |
| 1920 Antwerp | Bevil Rudd; South Africa | Guy Butler; Great Britain | Nils Engdahl; Sweden |
| 1924 Paris | Eric Liddell; Great Britain | Horatio Fitch; United States | Guy Butler; Great Britain |
| 1928 Amsterdam | Ray Barbuti; United States | James Ball; Canada | Joachim Büchner; Germany |
| 1932 Los Angeles | Bill Carr; United States | Ben Eastman; United States | Alex Wilson; Canada |
| 1936 Berlin | Archie Williams; United States | Godfrey Brown; Great Britain | James LuValle; United States |
| 1948 London | Arthur Wint; Jamaica | Herb McKenley; Jamaica | Mal Whitfield; United States |
| 1952 Helsinki | George Rhoden; Jamaica | Herb McKenley; Jamaica | Ollie Matson; United States |
| 1956 Melbourne | Charles Jenkins; United States | Karl-Friedrich Haas; United Team of Germany | Voitto Hellsten; Finland |
| 1956 Melbourne | Charles Jenkins; United States | Karl-Friedrich Haas; United Team of Germany | Ardalion Ignatyev; Soviet Union |
| 1960 Rome | Otis Davis; United States | Carl Kaufmann; United Team of Germany | Malcolm Spence; South Africa |
| 1964 Tokyo | Mike Larrabee; United States | Wendell Mottley; Trinidad and Tobago | Andrzej Badeński; Poland |
| 1968 Mexico City | Lee Evans; United States | Larry James; United States | Ron Freeman; United States |
| 1972 Munich | Vincent Matthews; United States | Wayne Collett; United States | Julius Sang; Kenya |
| 1976 Montreal | Alberto Juantorena; Cuba | Fred Newhouse; United States | Herman Frazier; United States |
| 1980 Moscow | Viktor Markin; Soviet Union | Rick Mitchell; Australia | Frank Schaffer; East Germany |
| 1984 Los Angeles | Alonzo Babers; United States | Gabriel Tiacoh; Ivory Coast | Antonio McKay; United States |
| 1988 Seoul | Steve Lewis; United States | Butch Reynolds; United States | Danny Everett; United States |
| 1992 Barcelona | Quincy Watts; United States | Steve Lewis; United States | Samson Kitur; Kenya |
| 1996 Atlanta | Michael Johnson; United States | Roger Black; Great Britain | Davis Kamoga; Uganda |
| 2000 Sydney | Michael Johnson; United States | Alvin Harrison; United States | Greg Haughton; Jamaica |
| 2004 Athens | Jeremy Wariner; United States | Otis Harris; United States | Derrick Brew; United States |
| 2008 Beijing | LaShawn Merritt; United States | Jeremy Wariner; United States | David Neville; United States |
| 2012 London | Kirani James; Grenada | Luguelín Santos; Dominican Republic | Lalonde Gordon; Trinidad and Tobago |
| 2016 Rio de Janeiro | Wayde van Niekerk; South Africa | Kirani James; Grenada | LaShawn Merritt; United States |
| 2020 Tokyo | Steven Gardiner; Bahamas | Anthony Zambrano; Colombia | Kirani James; Grenada |
| 2024 Paris | Quincy Hall; United States | Matthew Hudson Smith; Great Britain | Muzala Samukonga; Zambia |
| 2028 Los Angeles | | | |

==== Multiple medalists ====
| Rank | Athlete | Nation | Olympics | Gold | Silver | Bronze | Total |
|---|---|---|---|---|---|---|---|
| 1 | Michael Johnson | United States | 1996–2000 | 2 | 0 | 0 | 2 |
| 2 | Kirani James | Grenada | 2012–2021 | 1 | 1 | 1 | 3 |
| 3 | Steve Lewis | United States | 1988–1992 | 1 | 1 | 0 | 2 |
| 3 | Jeremy Wariner | United States | 2004–2008 | 1 | 1 | 0 | 2 |
| 5 | LaShawn Merritt | United States | 2008–2016 | 1 | 0 | 1 | 2 |
| 6 | Herb McKenley | Jamaica | 1948–1952 | 0 | 2 | 0 | 2 |
| 7 | Guy Butler | Great Britain | 1920–1924 | 0 | 1 | 1 | 2 |

==== Medals by country ====
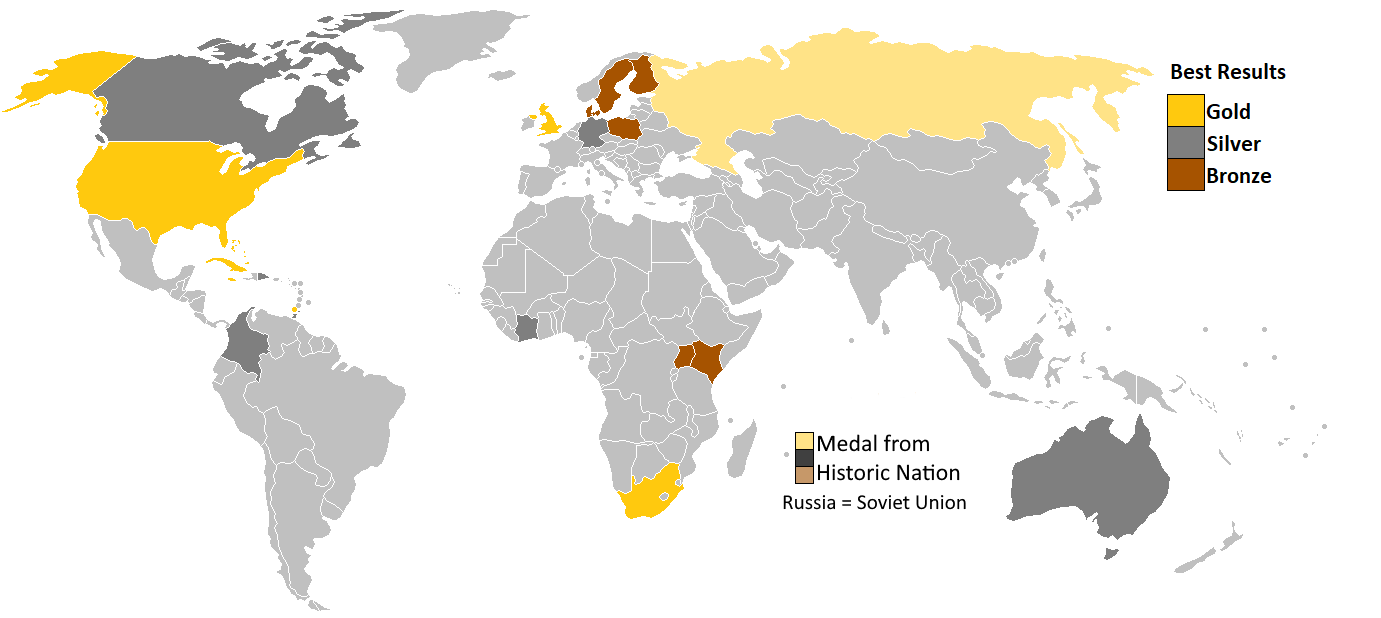
Map of countries' best results - Men's 400 metres

| Rank | Nation | Gold | Silver | Bronze | Total |
|---|---|---|---|---|---|
| 1 | United States | 20 | 13 | 11 | 39 |
| 2 | Great Britain | 2 | 4 | 2 | 8 |
| 3 | Jamaica | 2 | 2 | 1 | 5 |
| 4 | South Africa | 2 | 0 | 1 | 3 |
| 5 | Grenada | 1 | 1 | 1 | 3 |
| 6 | Soviet Union | 1 | 0 | 1 | 2 |
| 7= | Bahamas | 1 | 0 | 0 | 1 |
| 7= | Cuba | 1 | 0 | 0 | 1 |
| 9 | Germany^{[nb]} | 0 | 3 | 1 | 4 |
| 10= | Canada | 0 | 1 | 1 | 2 |
| 10= | Trinidad and Tobago | 0 | 1 | 1 | 2 |
| 12= | Australia | 0 | 1 | 0 | 1 |
| 12= | Colombia | 0 | 1 | 0 | 1 |
| 12= | Dominican Republic | 0 | 1 | 0 | 1 |
| 12= | Ivory Coast | 0 | 1 | 0 | 1 |
| 16 | Kenya | 0 | 0 | 2 | 2 |
| 17= | Denmark | 0 | 0 | 1 | 1 |
| 17= | East Germany | 0 | 0 | 1 | 1 |
| 17= | Finland | 0 | 0 | 1 | 1 |
| 17= | Poland | 0 | 0 | 1 | 1 |
| 17= | Sweden | 0 | 0 | 1 | 1 |
| 17= | Uganda | 0 | 0 | 1 | 1 |
| 17= | Zambia | 0 | 0 | 1 | 1 |

- ^{nb} The German total includes teams both competing as Germany and the United Team of Germany, but not East or West Germany.

=== Women ===
| Games | Gold | Silver | Bronze |
|---|---|---|---|
| 1964 Tokyo | Betty Cuthbert; Australia | Ann Packer; Great Britain | Judy Amoore; Australia |
| 1968 Mexico City | Colette Besson; France | Lillian Board; Great Britain | Natalya Pechonkina; Soviet Union |
| 1972 Munich | Monika Zehrt; East Germany | Rita Wilden; West Germany | Kathy Hammond; United States |
| 1976 Montreal | Irena Szewińska; Poland | Christina Brehmer; East Germany | Ellen Streidt; East Germany |
| 1980 Moscow | Marita Koch; East Germany | Jarmila Kratochvílová; Czechoslovakia | Christina Lathan; East Germany |
| 1984 Los Angeles | Valerie Brisco-Hooks; United States | Chandra Cheeseborough; United States | Kathy Smallwood-Cook; Great Britain |
| 1988 Seoul | Olga Bryzgina; Soviet Union | Petra Müller; East Germany | Olga Nazarova; Soviet Union |
| 1992 Barcelona | Marie-José Pérec; France | Olga Bryzgina; Unified Team | Ximena Restrepo; Colombia |
| 1996 Atlanta | Marie-José Pérec; France | Cathy Freeman; Australia | Falilat Ogunkoya; Nigeria |
| 2000 Sydney | Cathy Freeman; Australia | Lorraine Graham; Jamaica | Katharine Merry; Great Britain |
| 2004 Athens | Tonique Williams-Darling; Bahamas | Ana Guevara; Mexico | Natalya Antyukh; Russia |
| 2008 Beijing | Christine Ohuruogu; Great Britain | Shericka Williams; Jamaica | Sanya Richards; United States |
| 2012 London | Sanya Richards-Ross; United States | Christine Ohuruogu; Great Britain | DeeDee Trotter; United States |
| 2016 Rio de Janeiro | Shaunae Miller; Bahamas | Allyson Felix; United States | Shericka Jackson; Jamaica |
| 2020 Tokyo | Shaunae Miller-Uibo; Bahamas | Marileidy Paulino; Dominican Republic | Allyson Felix; United States |
| 2024 Paris | Marileidy Paulino; Dominican Republic | Salwa Eid Naser; Bahrain | Natalia Kaczmarek; Poland |
| 2028 Los Angeles | | | |

==== Multiple medalists ====
| Rank | Athlete | Nation | Olympics | Gold | Silver | Bronze | Total |
|---|---|---|---|---|---|---|---|
| 1= | Marie-José Pérec | France | 1992–1996 | 2 | 0 | 0 | 2 |
| 1= | Shaunae Miller-Uibo | Bahamas | 2016–2020 | 2 | 0 | 0 | 2 |
| 2= | Olga Bryzgina | Soviet Union; Unified Team | 1988–1992 | 1 | 1 | 0 | 2 |
| 2= | Cathy Freeman | Australia | 1996–2000 | 1 | 1 | 0 | 2 |
| 2= | Christine Ohuruogu | Great Britain | 2008–2012 | 1 | 1 | 0 | 2 |
| 2= | Marileidy Paulino | Dominican Republic | 2020–2024 | 1 | 1 | 0 | 2 |
| 7 | Sanya Richards-Ross | United States | 2008–2012 | 1 | 0 | 1 | 2 |
| 8= | Christina Lathan | East Germany | 1976–1980 | 0 | 1 | 1 | 2 |
| 8= | Allyson Felix | United States | 2016–2020 | 0 | 1 | 1 | 2 |

==== Medalists by country ====
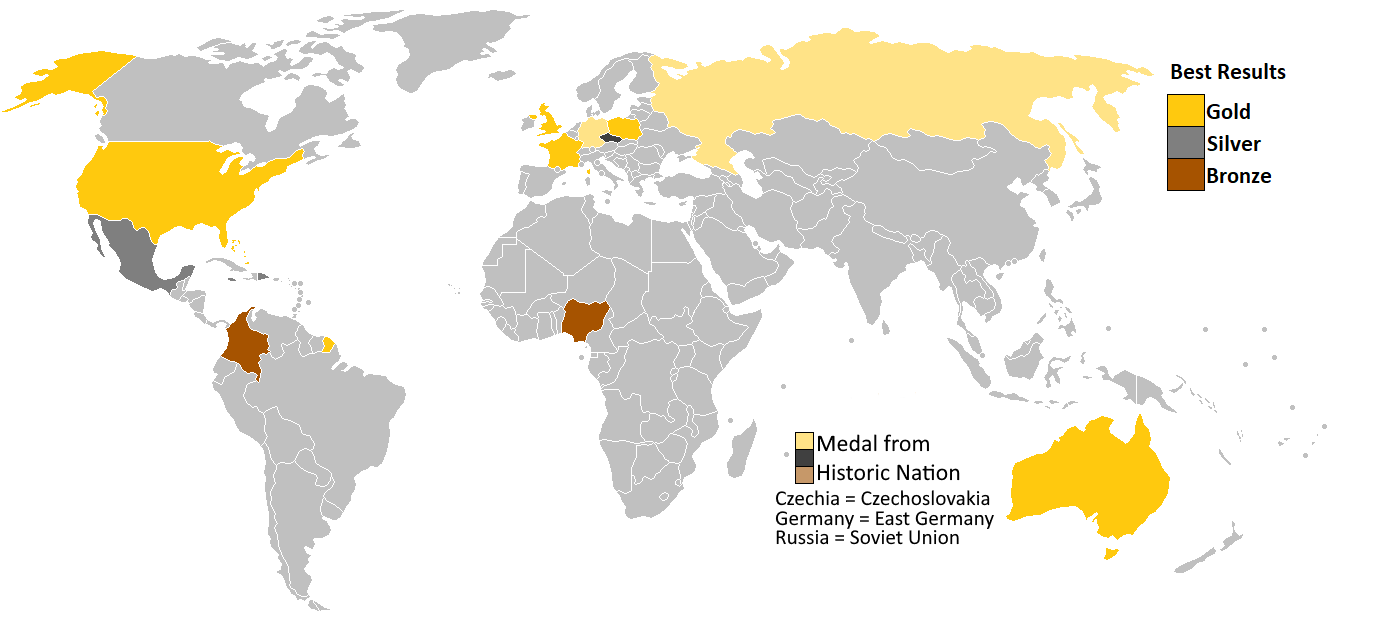
Map of countries' best results - Women's 400 metres

| Rank | Nation | Gold | Silver | Bronze | Total |
|---|---|---|---|---|---|
| 1= | Bahamas | 3 | 0 | 0 | 3 |
| 1= | France | 3 | 0 | 0 | 3 |
| 3 | East Germany | 2 | 2 | 2 | 6 |
| 4 | United States | 2 | 1 | 4 | 7 |
| 5 | Australia | 2 | 1 | 1 | 4 |
| 6 | Great Britain | 1 | 3 | 2 | 6 |
| 7 | Dominican Republic | 1 | 1 | 0 | 2 |
| 8 | Soviet Union | 1 | 0 | 2 | 3 |
| 9 | Poland | 1 | 0 | 1 | 2 |
| 10 | Jamaica | 0 | 2 | 1 | 3 |
| 11= | Czechoslovakia | 0 | 1 | 0 | 1 |
| 11= | Bahrain | 0 | 1 | 0 | 1 |
| 11= | Mexico | 0 | 1 | 0 | 1 |
| 11= | Unified Team | 0 | 1 | 0 | 1 |
| 11= | West Germany | 0 | 1 | 0 | 1 |
| 16= | Colombia | 0 | 0 | 1 | 1 |
| 16= | Nigeria | 0 | 0 | 1 | 1 |
| 16= | Russia | 0 | 0 | 1 | 1 |

== Olympic record progression ==
=== Men ===
| Time | Athlete | Nation | Games | Round | Date |
|---|---|---|---|---|---|
| 56.8 | Herbert Jamison | United States | 1896 | Heat 1 | |
| 54.2 | Tom Burke | United States | 1896 | Final | |
| 50.4 | Maxie Long | United States | 1900 | Heat 1 | |
| 49.4 | Maxie Long | United States | 1900 | Final | |
| 49.2 | Harry Hillman | United States | 1904 | Final | |
| 48.4 | Wyndham Halswelle | Great Britain | 1904 | Quarterfinal 2 | |
| 48.2 | Charles Reidpath | United States | 1912 | Final | |
| 48.0 | Joseph Imbach | Switzerland | 1924 | Quarterfinal 6 | |
| 47.8 | Horatio Fitch | United States | 1924 | Semifinal 1 | |
| 47.6 WR | Eric Liddell | Great Britain | 1924 | Final | |
| 47.2 | Bill Carr | United States | 1932 | Semifinal 1 | |
| 46.2 WR | Bill Carr | United States | 1932 | Final | |
| 46.2 | Arthur Wint | Jamaica | 1948 | Final | |
| 45.9 | George Rhoden | Jamaica | 1952 | Final | |
| 45.9 | Otis Davis | United States | 1960 | Quarterfinal 4 | |
| 45.5 | Otis Davis | United States | 1960 | Semifinal 1 | |
| 44.9 WR | Otis Davis | United States | 1960 | Final | |
| 44.83 | Lee Evans | United States | 1968 | Semifinal 2 | |
| 43.86 WR | Lee Evans | United States | 1968 | Final | |
| 43.71 | Quincy Watts | United States | 1992 | Semifinal 1 | |
| 43.50 | Quincy Watts | United States | 1992 | Final | |
| 43.49 | Michael Johnson | United States | 1996 | Final | |
| 43.03 WR | Wayde van Niekerk | South Africa | 2016 | Final | |

=== Women ===
| Time | Athlete | Nation | Games | Round | Date |
|---|---|---|---|---|---|
| 54.4 | Antónia Munkácsi | Hungary | 1964 | Heat 1 | |
| 53.1 | Ann Packer | Great Britain | 1964 | Heat 3 | |
| 52.7 | Ann Packer | Great Britain | 1964 | Semifinal 1 | |
| 52.0 | Betty Cuthbert | Australia | 1964 | Final | |
| 52.03 | Colette Besson | France | 1968 | Final | |
| 51.94 | Charlene Rendina | Australia | 1972 | Heat 1 | |
| 51.71 | Györgyi Balogh | Hungary | 1972 | Quarterfinal 3 | |
| 51.68 | Helga Seidler | East Germany | 1972 | Semifinal 1 | |
| 51.47 | Monika Zehrt | East Germany | 1972 | Semifinal 2 | |
| 51.08 | Monika Zehrt | East Germany | 1972 | Final | |
| 50.48 | Irena Szewińska | Poland | 1976 | Semifinal 1 | |
| 49.28 WR | Irena Szewińska | Poland | 1976 | Final | |
| 48.88 | Marita Koch | East Germany | 1980 | Final | 28 July |
| 48.83 | Valerie Brisco-Hooks | United States | 1984 | Final | 6 August |
| 48.65 | Olha Bryzhina | Soviet Union | 1988 | Final | 26 September |
| 48.25 | Marie-José Pérec | France | 1996 | Final | 29 July |
| 48.17 | Marileidy Paulino | Dominican Republic | 2024 | Final | 9 August |

== Intercalated Games ==
The 1906 Intercalated Games were held in Athens and at the time were officially recognised as part of the Olympic Games series, with the intention being to hold a games in Greece in two-year intervals between the internationally-held Olympics. However, this plan never came to fruition and the International Olympic Committee (IOC) later decided not to recognise these games as part of the official Olympic series. Some sports historians continue to treat the results of these games as part of the Olympic canon.

At this event a men's 400 m was held and Paul Pilgrim, a 1904 Olympic gold medalist in the 4-mile team race, won the competition. Wyndham Halswelle, later the 1908 Olympic champion in the 400 metres on walkover, was the runner-up while Australia's Nigel Barker was the bronze medalist.

| Games | Gold | Silver | Bronze |
|---|---|---|---|
| 1906 Athens | Paul Pilgrim (USA) | Wyndham Halswelle (GBR) | Nigel Barker (AUS) |

== Non-canonical Olympic events ==
In addition to the main 1900 Olympic men's 400 metres, a handicap competition was contested seven days after the final. Twenty men entered, with Hungary's Pál Koppán, Germany's Albert Werkmüller and Dave Hall of the United States being the only non-French entrants. Koppán was the victor with a handicap of 35 m, Werkmüller was second with a handicap of 35 m, and Frenchman André Lemonnier took third with a 26 m handicap.

Two professionals-only events were also held in 1900. The 400 metres world record holder Edgar Bredin won with a time of 53.2 seconds, ahead of Legrain of France (possibly Paul Legrain) and his compatriot Jules Bouchoux. A handicap professional race was also held but the results have not been located.

A handicap 440-yard dash (402.3 m) competition was held at 1904 Summer Olympics after the 1904 Olympic men's 400 m race. An American, F. Darcy, won the race with a time of 50.8 (12-yard start). George Underwood, also of the United States, came second with no handicap and James Peck of Canada came third off a six-yard headstart.

These events are no longer considered part of the official Olympic history of the 400 metres or the athletics programme in general. Consequently, medals from these competitions have not been assigned to nations on the all-time medal tables.

== Finishing times ==
The 2024 men's final was the fastest 400-meter race in Olympic history, collectively: five of the eight men ran under 43.87 seconds, with these five times ranking among the top 15 fastest Olympic times.

=== Top ten fastest Olympic times ===
Fastest men's times at the Olympics
| Rank | Time (sec) | Athlete | Nation | Games | Date |
|---|---|---|---|---|---|
| 1 | 43.03 (WR) | Wayde Van Niekerk | South Africa | 2016 | 2016-08-14 |
| 2 | 43.40 | Quincy Hall | United States | 2024 | 2024-08-07 |
| 3 | 43.44 | Matthew Hudson-Smith | United Kingdom | 2024 | 2024-08-07 |
| 4 | 43.49 | Michael Johnson | United States | 1996 | 1996-07-29 |
| 5 | 43.50 | Quincy Watts | United States | 1992 | 1992-08-04 |
| 6 | 43.71 | Quincy Watts | United States | 1992 ^{SF} | 1992-08-04 |
| 7 | 43.74 | Muzala Samukonga | Zambia | 2024 | 2024-08-07 |
| 8 | 43.75 | LaShawn Merritt | United States | 2008 | 2008-08-21 |
| 9 | 43.76 | Kirani James | Grenada | 2016 | 2016-08-14 |
| 10 | 43.78 | Kirani James | Grenada | 2024^{SF} | 2024-08-06 |
| 10 | 43.78 | Jereem Richards | Trinidad and Tobago | 2024 | 2024-08-07 |

Fastest women's times at the Olympics
| Rank | Time (sec) | Athlete | Nation | Games | Date |
|---|---|---|---|---|---|
| 1 | 48.17 | Marileidy Paulino | Dominican Republic | 2024 | 2024-08-09 |
| 2 | 48.25 | Marie-José Pérec | France | 1996 | 1996-07-29 |
| 3 | 48.36 | Shaunae Miller-Uibo | Bahamas | 2021 | 2021-08-06 |
| 4 | 48.53 | Salwa Eid Naser | Bahrain | 2024 | 2024-08-09 |
| 5 | 48.63 | Cathy Freeman | Australia | 1996 | 1996-07-29 |
| 6 | 48.65 | Olga Bryzgina | Soviet Union | 1988 | 1988-09-26 |
| 7 | 48.83 | Valerie Brisco-Hooks | United States | 1984 | 1984-08-06 |
| 7 | 48.83 | Marie-José Pérec | France | 1992 | 1992-08-05 |
| 9 | 48.88 | Marita Koch | East Germany | 1980 | 1980-07-28 |
| 10 | 48.98 | Natalia Kaczmarek | Poland | 2024 | 2024-08-09 |

==== Legend ====
SF: Semifinals
