= Athletics at the 1904 Summer Olympics – Men's 800 metres =

Men's 800 metres at the Games of the III Olympiad
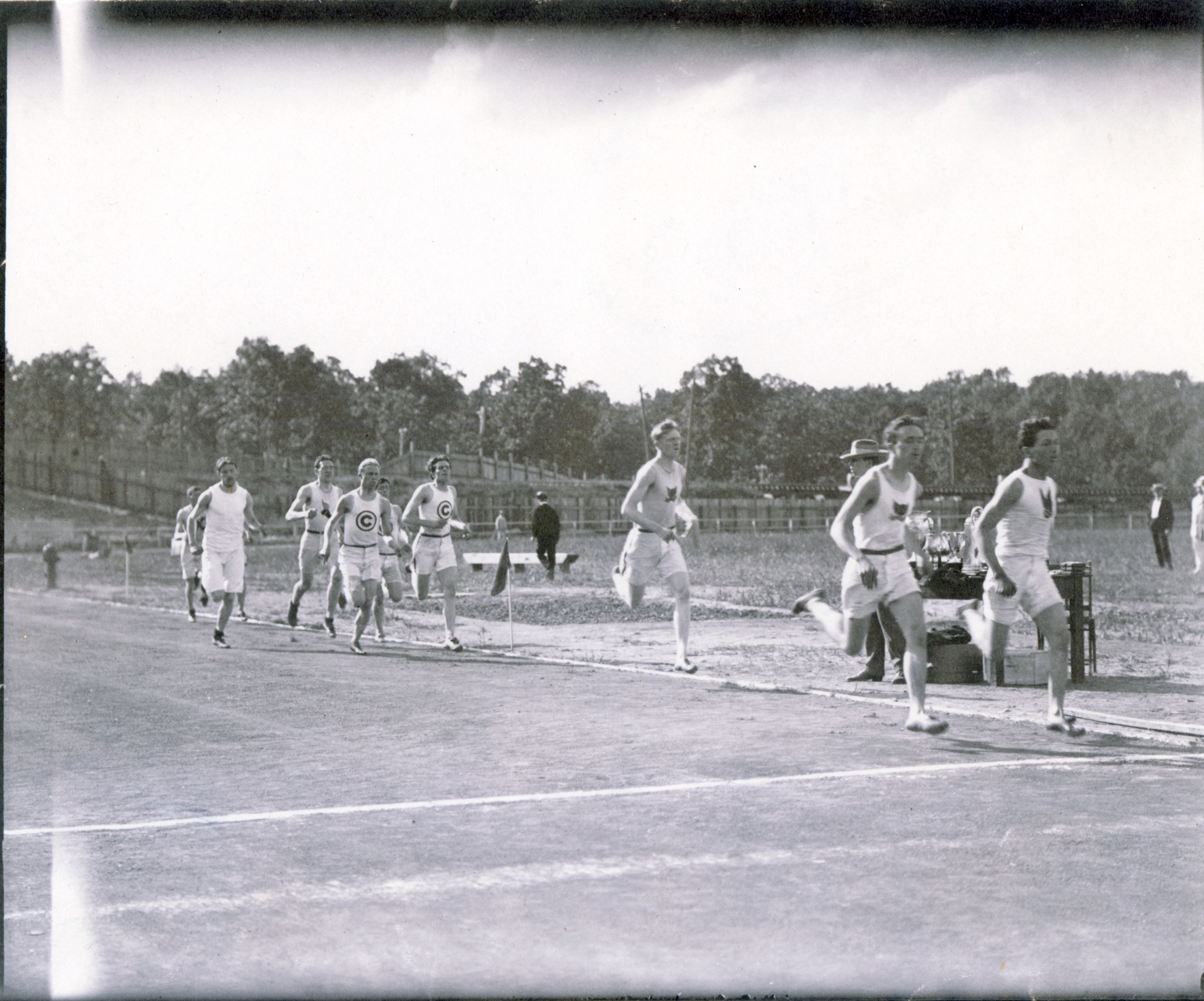
- The final lap of the race. Gold medalist Jim Lightbody is in fourth place at this point.
- Venue: Francis Field
- Date: September 1, 1904
- Competitors: 13 from 3 nations
- Winning time: 1:56.0 OR

Medalists
1st place, gold medalist(s)		Jim Lightbody; United States
2nd place, silver medalist(s)		Howard Valentine; United States
3rd place, bronze medalist(s)		Emil Breitkreutz; United States

The men's 800 metres was a track and field athletics event held as part of the Athletics at the 1904 Summer Olympics programme. It was the third time the event was held. 13 runners from 3 nations participated. The competition was held on September 1, 1904. The event was won by Jim Lightbody of the United States, the nation's first title in the 800 metres. The United States, with 10 of the 13 runners, swept the medals—the first sweep of the 800 metres podium.

== Background ==
This was the third appearance of the event, which is one of 12 athletics events to have been held at every Summer Olympics. None of the runners from 1900 returned. There was no clear favorite, "but Jim Lightbody . . . was not one of the prominent names mentioned." Johannes Runge of Germany had run the 800 metres handicap event earlier in the day due to confusion over English instructions.

Canada appeared in the event for the first time. The United States and Germany each made their second appearance, matching France, Great Britain, and Hungary for the most among all nations.

== Competition format ==
In contrast to the previous editions in 1896 and 1900, the 1904 version of the 800 metres consisted of a single round rather than heats and a final.

The track was a cinder track 1/3 mile (536.448m) in length, with one long straightaway.

== Records ==
These were the standing world and Olympic records (in minutes) prior to the 1904 Summer Olympics.

World record	Charles Kilpatrick (USA)	1:53.4 (y)(u)	New York City, United States	21 September 1895
Olympic record	David Hall (USA)	1:59.0(*)	Paris, France	14 July 1900

(*) This track was 500 metres in circumference.

Jim Lightbody set a new Olympic record with 1:56.0.

== Schedule ==
Date	Time	Round
Thursday, 1 September 1904		Final

== Results ==
Cohn led early, with Breitkreutz and Runge behind him. Lightbody started slowest. About halfway, Runge took the lead and Lightbody began to push forward. Breitkreutz took the lead over Runge (who had also run the 800 metres handicap event earlier in the day due to confusion), with Underwood second, before the final straight. Lightbody finished his last-to-first push, winning by 2 yards over Valentine, who also made a late push.

Rank	Athlete	Nation	Time	Notes
1st place, gold medalist(s)	Jim Lightbody	United States	1:56.0	OR
2nd place, silver medalist(s)	Howard Valentine	United States	1:56.3	
3rd place, bronze medalist(s)	Emil Breitkreutz	United States	1:56.4	
4	George Underwood	United States	1:56.5	Time approximate
5	Johannes Runge	Germany	1:57.1	Time approximate
6	Frank Verner	United States	Unknown	
7–13	George Bonhag	United States	Unknown	
7–13	Harvey Cohn	United States	Unknown	
7–13	Peter Deer	Canada	Unknown	
7–13	Lacey Hearn	United States	Unknown	
7–13	John J. Joyce	United States	Unknown	
7–13	James Peck	Canada	Unknown	
7–13	Paul Pilgrim	United States	Unknown	
—	Charles Bacon	United States	DNS	
—	Will Gunn	New Zealand	DNS	
—	Harry Kiener	United States	DNS	
—	David Curtiss Munson	United States	DNS	

== Sources ==
- Wudarski, Pawel (1999). "Wyniki Igrzysk Olimpijskich" (in Polish).
