= Athletics at the 1904 Summer Olympics – Men's 400 metres =

Men's 400 metres at the Games of the III Olympiad
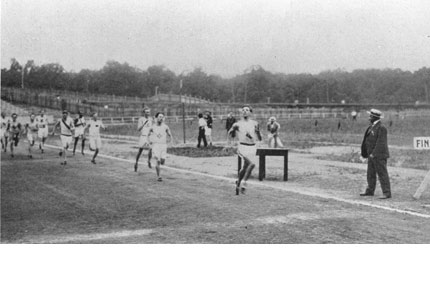
- Finish of 400 metres
- Venue: Francis Field
- Dates: August 29, 1904
- Competitors: 12 from 3 nations
- Winning time: 49.2 OR

Medalists
1st place, gold medalist(s)		Harry Hillman	United States
2nd place, silver medalist(s)		Frank Waller	United States
3rd place, bronze medalist(s)		Herman Groman	United States

The men's 400 metres was a track and field athletics event held as part of the Athletics at the 1904 Summer Olympics programme. It was the third time the event was held. 12 athletes from 3 nations participated. The competition was held on August 29, 1904. The event was won by Harry Hillman of the United States, the third time in a row that a different American had won the event. The Americans swept the medals, the first time that feat had been achieved in the men's 400 metres.

== Background ==
This was the third time the event was held. None of the runners from 1900 returned. Harry Hillman of the United States and Percival Molson of Canada were the favorites; Molson had beaten Hillman at the 1904 Canadian championships.

Molson was Canada's first-ever runner in the Olympic men's 400 metres. The United States made its third appearance in the event, the only nation to compete in it at the first three Olympic Games.

== Competition format ==
The competition consisted of a single race with all runners starting together.

== Records ==
These were the standing world and Olympic records (in seconds) prior to the 1904 Summer Olympics.

World record	Maxie Long (USA)	47.8(*)	New York City, United States	29 September 1900
Olympic record	Maxie Long (USA)	49.4(**)	Paris, France	15 July 1900

(*) 440 yards (= 402.34 m)

(**) This track was 500 metres in circumference.

Harry Hillman set a new Olympic record with 49.2 seconds.

== Results ==
Groman took the lead at 70 metres; Hillman, Waller, Poage, and Prinstein formed a group behind him while the other six runners formed a second group further back. Hillman passed Groman at the halfway mark, with Fleming moving up into the first group. Poage attempted to take the lead in the last turn, but Fleming and Waller blocked him and he fell back to the train group before the final sprint. Hillman finished "about three yards" ahead of Waller, with Groman "on Waller's heels" and Fleming and Prinstein "almost together, another two yards back."

Rank	Athlete	Nation	Time	Notes
1st place, gold medalist(s)	Harry Hillman	United States	49.2	OR
2nd place, silver medalist(s)	Frank Waller	United States	49.9	
3rd place, bronze medalist(s)	Herman Groman	United States	50.0	
4	Joseph Fleming	United States	Unknown	
5	Myer Prinstein	United States	Unknown	
6	George Poage	United States	Unknown	
7–12	Clyde Blair	United States	Unknown	
7–12	Percival Molson	Canada	Unknown	
7–12	Paul Pilgrim	United States	Unknown	
7–12	Johannes Runge	Germany	Unknown	
7–12	George Underwood	United States	Unknown	
7–12	Howard Valentine	United States	Unknown	
—	Charles Bacon	United States	DNS	
—	Paul Behrens	United States	DNS	
—	Edwin Clapp	United States	DNS	
—	Phillips Comstock	United States	DNS	
—	Frank Davey	United States	DNS	
—	Frank Lukeman	Canada	DNS	
—	Fay Moulton	United States	DNS	
—	David Curtiss Munson	United States	DNS	

== Sources ==
- Wudarski, Pawel (1999). "Wyniki Igrzysk Olimpijskich" (in Polish).
