= Athletics at the 1904 Summer Olympics – Men's 2590 metres steeplechase =

Men's 2590 metres steeplechase at the Games of the III Olympiad
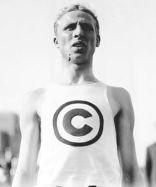
- Gold medalist Jim Lightbody
- Venue: Francis Field
- Dates: August 29, 1904
- Competitors: 7 from 2 nations

Medalists
1st place, gold medalist(s)		Jim Lightbody	United States
2nd place, silver medalist(s)		John Daly	Great Britain
3rd place, bronze medalist(s)		Arthur L. Newton	United States

The men's 2590 metres steeplechase was a track and field athletics event held as part of the Athletics at the 1904 Summer Olympics programme. It was the only time the event was held at the 2590 metre distance, though the 1900 Summer Olympics had featured a similar event in the 2500 metre steeplechase. The competition was held on August 29, 1904. 7 athletes from 2 nations competed. Jim Lightbody of the United States won the first of his three gold and four overall medals in the 1904 Games. Irishman John Daly took silver, with Lightbody's countryman Arthur L. Newton earning bronze.

== Background ==
Steeplechase events had been introduced to the Olympics in 1900, with two events at the Paris Games, at 2500 metres and 4000 metres. At St. Louis 1904, there was only one steeplechase event, at 2590 metres. The distance was changed to 3200 metres at London 1908, but the event was removed from the program at Stockholm 1912.

After World War I, steeplechase returned in 1920 at Antwerp at the now-standard distance of 3000 metres; it has been held at that distance ever since.

Irish runner John Daly was the favorite, while American Jim Lightbody was a distance runner who had never competed in a steeplechase before.

== Competition format ==
The race distance was 2590 metres, with hurdles and a water jump. Only a final was held.

The track was a cinder track 1/3 mile (536.448m) in length, with one long straightaway.

== Records ==
These were the standing world and Olympic records (in minutes) prior to the 1904 Summer Olympics.

World record		none		
Olympic record	7:34.4(*)	(Canada) George Orton	Paris (FRA)	July 15, 1900

(*) The distance of this race was 2500 metres and the track was 500 metres in circumference.

== Schedule ==
Date	Time	Round
Tuesday, 29 August 1904		Final

== Results ==
Rank	Athlete	Nation	Time
1st place, gold medalist(s)	Jim Lightbody	United States	7:39.6
2nd place, silver medalist(s)	John Daly	Great Britain	7:40.6
3rd place, bronze medalist(s)	Arthur L. Newton	United States	7:45.6
4	Frank Verner	United States	Unknown
5–7	Harvey Cohn	United States	Unknown
5–7	David Curtiss Munson	United States	Unknown
5–7	Richard Sanford	United States	Unknown
—	George Bonhag	United States	DNS
—	Bernard Gallagher	United States	DNS
—	Alexander Grant	United States	DNS
—	Lacey Hearn	United States	DNS
—	John Purcell	United States	DNS

== Sources ==
- Wudarski, Pawel (1999). "Wyniki Igrzysk Olimpijskich" (in Polish).
