= Athletics at the 1904 Summer Olympics =

Athletics at the Games of the III Olympiad
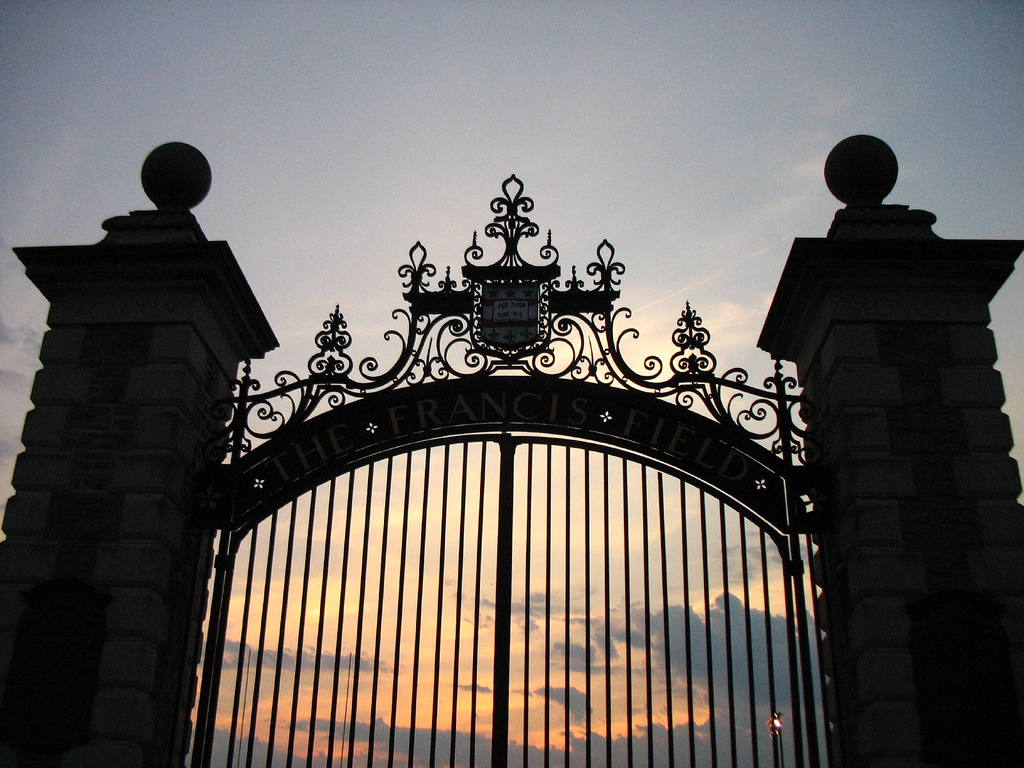
- Host stadium (shown in 2006)
- Venue: Francis Olympic Field
- Dates: 29 August – 3 September
- No. of events: 25
- Competitors: 233 from 10 nations

At the 1904 Summer Olympics, twenty-five athletics events were contested. A total of 74 medals (25 gold, 25 silver and 24 bronze) were awarded.

Multi-event competitions, the all-around and triathlon, were introduced, along with a 56-pound weight throw, while the short steeplechase was lengthened slightly from 2500 to 2590 metres, the team race was lengthened from 5000 meters to 4 miles (6,437 m), and the long steeplechase was dropped.

In all, the 25 events featured in 1904 were two more than were held in 1900.

A track was built specifically for the Games on the campus of Washington University in St. Louis. It was a cinder track 1/3 mile (536.448 m) in length, with one long straightaway.

== Medal summary ==
Event	Gold		Silver		Bronze	
60 metres	Archie Hahn; United States	7.0 WR	William Hogenson; United States	7.2	Fay Moulton; United States	7.2
100 metres	Archie Hahn; United States	11.0	Nate Cartmell; United States	11.2	William Hogenson; United States	11.2
200 metres	Archie Hahn; United States	21.6 OR	Nate Cartmell; United States	21.9	William Hogenson; United States	Unknown
400 metres	Harry Hillman; United States	49.2 OR	Frank Waller; United States	49.9	Herman Groman; United States	50.0
800 metres	James Lightbody; United States	1:56.0 OR	Howard Valentine; United States	1:56.3	Emil Breitkreutz; United States	1:56.4
1500 metres	James Lightbody; United States	4:05.4 WR	Frank Verner; United States	4:06.8	Lacey Hearn; United States	Unknown
Marathon	Thomas Hicks; United States	3:28:53	Albert Corey; United States	3:34:52	Arthur Newton; United States	3:47:33
110 metres hurdles	Fred Schule; United States	16.0	Thaddeus Shideler; United States	16.3	Lesley Ashburner; United States	16.4
200 metres hurdles	Harry Hillman; United States	24.6	Frank Castleman; United States	24.9	George Poage; United States	Unknown
400 metres hurdles	Harry Hillman; United States	53.0 OR	Frank Waller; United States	53.2	George Poage; United States	56.8
2590 metres steeplechase	James Lightbody; United States	7:39.6	John Daly; Great Britain	7:40.6	Arthur Newton; United States	7:45.6
4 miles team race	United States; New York AC; Arthur Newton; George Underwood; Paul Pilgrim; Howard Valentine; David Munson	27 pts	United States; Chicago AA; James Lightbody; Frank Verner; Lacey Hearn; Albert Corey (FRA); Sidney Hatch	28 pts	none awarded	
Long jump	Myer Prinstein; United States	7.34 m OR	Daniel Frank; United States	6.89 m	Robert Stangland; United States	6.88 m
Triple jump	Myer Prinstein; United States	14.32 m	Fred Englehardt; United States	13.90 m	Robert Stangland; United States	13.36 m
High jump	Samuel Jones; United States	1.80 m	Garrett Serviss; United States	1.77 m	Paul Weinstein; Germany	1.77 m
Pole vault	Charles Dvorak; United States	3.50 m OR	LeRoy Samse; United States	3.35 m	Louis Wilkins; United States	3.35 m
Standing long jump	Ray Ewry; United States	3.47 m WR	Charles King; United States	3.27 m	John Biller; United States	3.25 m
Standing triple jump	Ray Ewry; United States	10.54 m	Charles King; United States	10.16 m	Joseph Stadler; United States	9.60 m
Standing high jump	Ray Ewry; United States	1.60 m	Joseph Stadler; United States	1.44 m	Lawson Robertson; United States	1.44 m
Shot put	Ralph Rose; United States	14.81 m WR	Wesley Coe; United States	14.40 m	Lawrence Feuerbach; United States	13.37 m
Discus throw	Martin Sheridan; United States	39.28 m OR	Ralph Rose; United States	39.28 m OR	Nicolaos Georgandas; Greece	37.68 m
Hammer throw	John Flanagan; United States	51.23 m OR	John DeWitt; United States	50.26 m	Ralph Rose; United States	45.73 m
56 pound weight throw	Étienne Desmarteau; Canada	10.46 m	John Flanagan; United States	10.16 m	James Mitchell; United States	10.13 m
Triathlon	Max Emmerich; United States	35.7 pts	John Grieb; United States	34.0 pts	William Merz; United States	32.9 pts
All-around	Tom Kiely; Great Britain	6036 pts	Adam Gunn; United States	5907 pts	Truxtun Hare; United States	5813 pts

== Medal table ==
Rank	Nation	Gold	Silver	Bronze	Total
1	United States	23	24	22	69
2	Great Britain	1	1	0	2
3	Canada	1	0	0	1
4	Germany	0	0	1	1
4	Greece	0	0	1	1
Totals (5 entries)		25	25	24	74

== Participating nations ==
233 athletes from 11 nations competed. This figure includes the athletic triathlon event, which some sources exclude.

- Australia (2)
- Canada (5)
- Cuba (1)
- France (1)
- Germany (9)
- Great Britain (3)
- Greece (10)
- Hungary (2)
- South Africa (3)
- Switzerland (1)
- United States (196)

== Marathon ==
The marathon is widely regarded as one of the most bizarre events of the Games. It was run in brutally hot weather, over dusty roads, with horses and automobiles clearing the way and creating dust clouds.

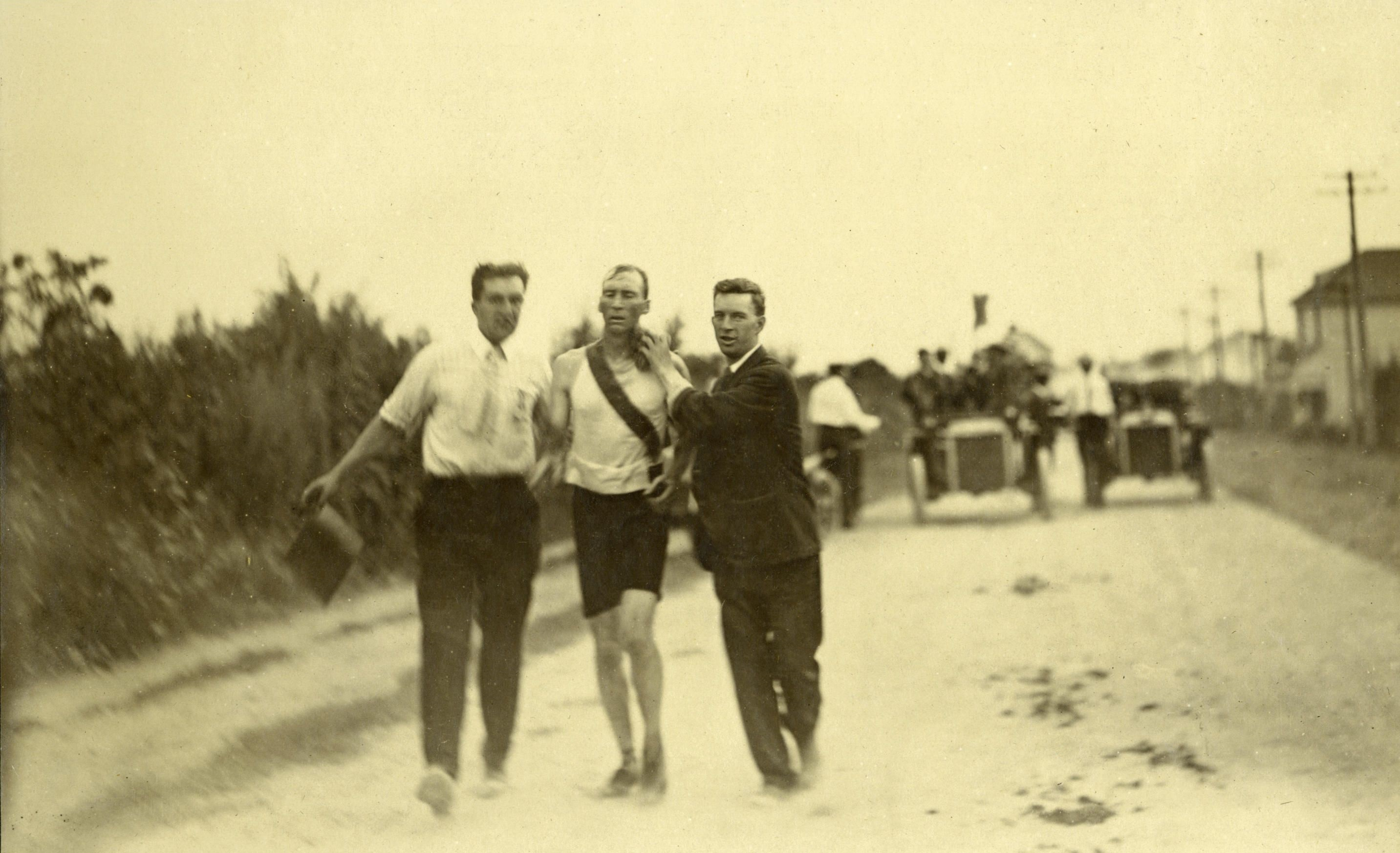
Hicks and his supporters at the marathon

The first to arrive at the finish line was Frederick Lorz, who had dropped out after nine miles, and actually rode the rest of the way in a car to retrieve his clothes, but after the car broke down at the 20th mile, he re-entered the race and jogged back to the finish line.

As officials and fans believed he had won the race, Lorz played along with his practical joke until he was found out shortly before the medal ceremony. He admitted the ruse, and was banned for life by the AAU; however, after Lorz apologized for this stunt and it was found he had no intention to defraud, he was reinstated, and won the 1905 Boston Marathon.

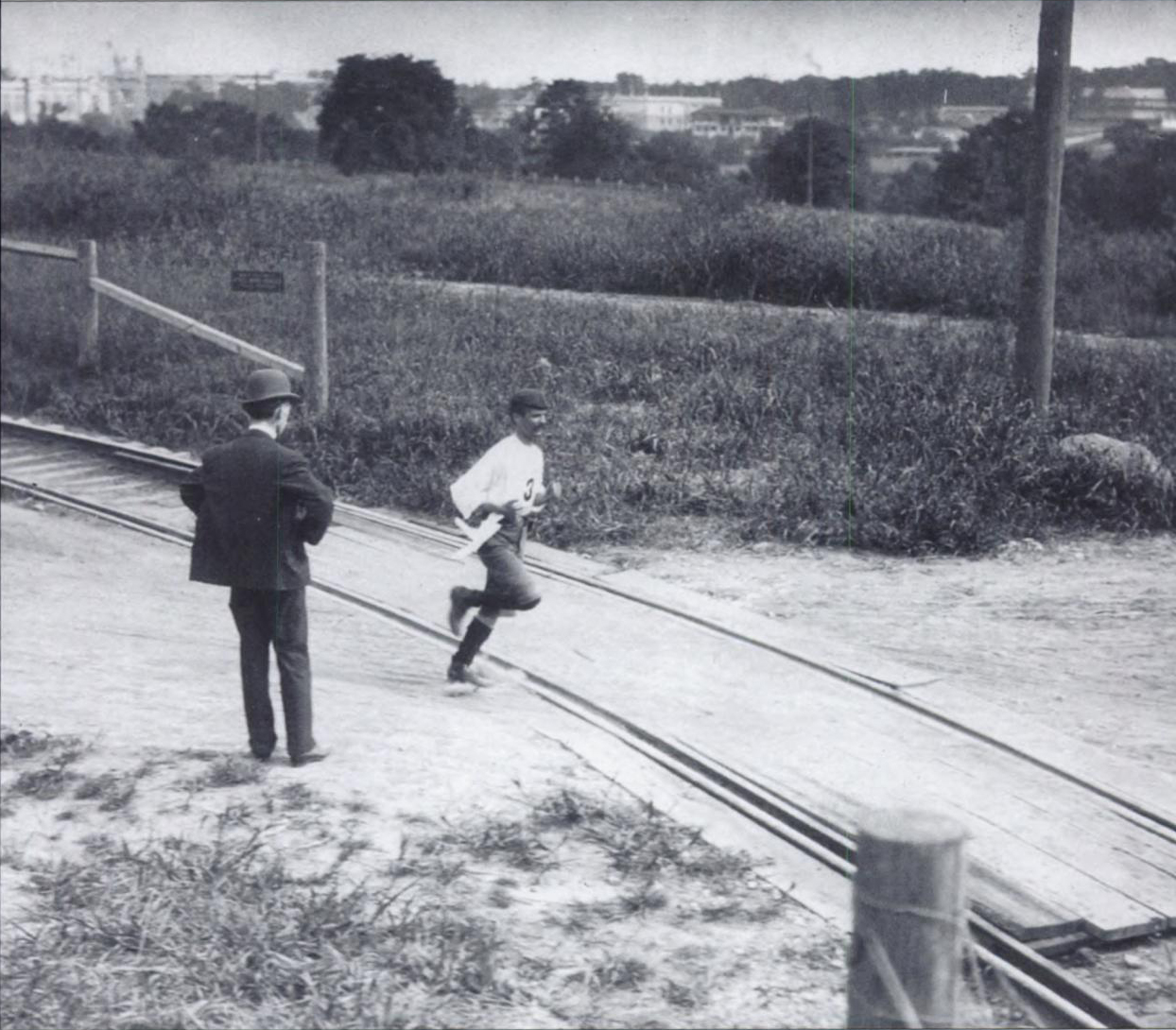
Felix Carvajal on his way to 4th place in the marathon

Thomas Hicks was the first to the finish legally, after having received from his trainers several doses of strychnine sulfate (a common rat poison, which stimulates the nervous system in small doses) mixed with egg whites and brandy. While he was supported by his trainers when he crossed the finish line, he is still considered the winner: Hicks had to be carried off the track on a stretcher, and possibly would have died in the stadium had he not been treated by several doctors. He lost eight pounds during the course of the marathon.

A Cuban postman named Felix Carvajal joined the marathon, arriving at the last minute. He had to run in street clothes that a fellow runner cut around the legs to make them look like shorts. He stopped off in an orchard en route to have a snack on some apples which turned out to be rotten, and caused him to have to lie down and take a nap. Despite falling ill from the apples, he finished in fourth place.
