= Athletics at the 1904 Summer Olympics – Men's 4 miles team race =

Men's 4 miles team race at the Games of the III Olympiad
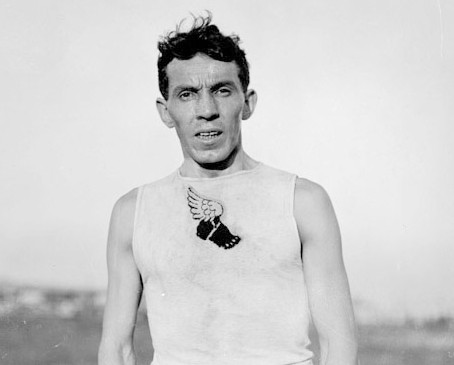
- Arthur L. Newton led New York AC to the gold medal in the team event
- Venue: Francis Field
- Date: September 3, 1904
- Competitors: 10 from 2 nations

Medalists
1st place, gold medalist(s)		United States: David Curtiss Munson; Arthur L. Newton; Paul Pilgrim; George Underwood; Howard Valentine
2nd place, silver medalist(s)		United States: Albert Corey; Sidney Hatch; Lacey Hearn; Jim Lightbody; Frank Verner

The men's 4 miles team race was a track and field athletics event held as part of the Athletics at the 1904 Summer Olympics programme. It was the first time the event was held, though the 1900 Summer Olympics had featured a similar event in the 5000 metre team race. Two teams of five athletes each competed. The competition was held on September 3, 1904. The event was won by the New York AC team, with Arthur L. Newton finishing first individually; Chicago AA had the next three finishers (starting with Jim Lightbody in second), but Chicago also had the last two runners. New York won by 1 point.

== Background ==
A team race event had been introduced to the Olympics in 1900, with a 5000 metres version. The 1904 Games were the only one at which the distance was 4 miles. A 3 miles team race would be held in 1908 before the distance was standardized to 3000 metres for 1912, 1920, and 1924. Team races were removed from the programme after that.

This was the last event on the athletics programme, with New York AC and Chicago AA tied for the lead in team victories up to this point.

== Competition format ==
The race distance was 4 miles. Only a final was held. All of the runners began in a mass start. The team score was based on a point-for-place system, with the first runner scoring 1 point, second 2 points, and so forth. The team with the lowest score, adding all five team members' scores, was the winner.

The track was a cinder track 1/3 mile in length with one long straightaway.

== Records ==
The individual four mile race was held annually at the British AAA Championships, where the best known time was 20:12 4/5 by Walter George in 1884.

World record	Walter George (GBR)	20:12 4/5	Birmingham	21 June 1884
Olympic record	N/A			

== Schedule ==
Date	Time	Round
Saturday, 3 September 1904		Final

== Results ==
=== Individual standings ===
The points system was based on point-for-place, with low scores desirable.

Rank	Athlete	Nationality	Team	Time	Points
1	Arthur L. Newton	United States	New York AC	21:17.8	1
2	Jim Lightbody	United States	Chicago AA	Unknown	2
3	Frank Verner	United States	Chicago AA	Unknown	3
4	Lacey Hearn	United States	Chicago AA	Unknown	4
5	George Underwood	United States	New York AC	Unknown	5
6	Paul Pilgrim	United States	New York AC	Unknown	6
7	Howard Valentine	United States	New York AC	Unknown	7
8	David Curtiss Munson	United States	New York AC	Unknown	8
9	Albert Corey	France	Chicago AA	Unknown	9
10	Sidney Hatch	United States	Chicago AA	Unknown	10

=== Team standings ===
The scores from each of the individual team members were summed, with the lowest-scoring team winning.

Rank	Team	Nation	Points
1st place, gold medalist(s)	New York AC	United States	27
2nd place, silver medalist(s)	Chicago AA	United States	28
