= Sidney Hatch =

American long-distance runner

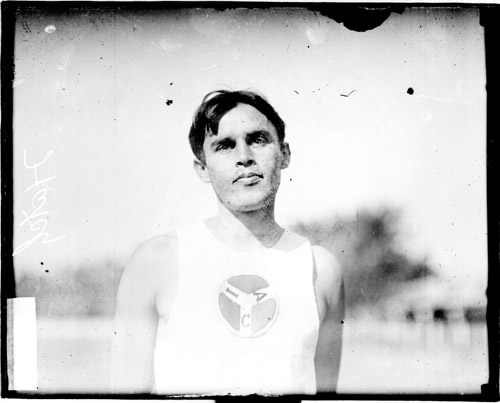
- Hatch in 1908

Personal information
- Born: Sidney Herbert Hatch; August 18, 1883 River Forest, Illinois, U.S.
- Died: October 17, 1966 (aged 83) Maywood, Illinois, U.S.

Sport
- Sport: Long-distance running
- Event: Marathon
Medal record
Men's athletics
Representing a Mixed team
Olympic Games
Silver medal – second place	1904 St Louis	4 mile team

Sidney Herbert Hatch (August 18, 1883 – October 17, 1966) was an American athlete who competed for the United States in the 1904 Summer Olympics held in St. Louis, United States, in the 4-mile team where he won the silver medal with his teammates James Lightbody, Frank Verner, Lacey Hearn and Frenchman Albert Corey.

== Biography ==
Sidney Hatch was also a well-known marathon runner in his time. From 1904 through 1922 he ran more than 45 marathons with a score of victories including the Chicago Marathon in 1909 and the Yonkers Marathon in 1911, competing as a member of the Illinois State Gaelic A.A In 1910, he finished in 5th place in the Yonkers Marathon, competing as a member of the Chicago Irish American Athletic Club.

He never failed to finish a marathon. He was a six-time (1906, 1907, 1908, 1911, 1914, and 1915) winner of the Missouri Athletic Club's All Western Marathon in St Louis including the 1908 marathon that qualified him for the 1908 Olympics. He competed in the marathon in two Olympics, placing 8th in 1904 at St Louis and 14th in 1908 in London. He won a silver medal in the 1904 Olympics Four-Mile team event.

On January 8, 1909, Hatch finished third behind Matthew Maloney and James Crowley in an indoor marathon before 5,000 "wildly cheering" spectators held within the second Madison Square Garden (3:03:29.4). Maloney was reported to have set a new indoor record for the event (2:54:45.4).

On November 27, 1909, Hatch finished sixth in the third edition of the Yonkers Marathon (3:00:24). In July of the same year, he won a 100-mile race in Chicago.

In March, 1912, Hatch was one of "twenty of the best distance runners in the middle west" scheduled to participate in a 20-mile indoor marathon at Riverview Rink in Chicago, Illinois. He also qualified for the 1912 Olympics but did not compete. He placed in the top 10 in the Boston Marathon several times with a second-placed finish in the Boston Marathon in 1917. He finished third in the Boston Marathon in 1915 and 1916. In October 1916 he set a record in the 96-mile Milwaukee to Chicago Run, completing the race in 14 hours, 50 minutes and 30 seconds.

He served as a US Army messenger in World War I and was decorated for "extraordinary heroism" under fire near Brieulles, France, 11 October 1918. He was awarded the Purple Heart and Distinguished Service Cross as well as the French Croix de Guerre. After World War I he returned to run two more Boston marathons before retiring from marathon running. He was a letter carrier in River Forest, Illinois from 1923 to 1953, retiring at age 70. He and Gertrude Morris were married in 1921 and had three children; Herbert, and twin girls June and Jane.

He was born in River Forest, Illinois and died in Maywood, Illinois. Sidney is buried at the Chapel Hills Gardens West Cemetery, Oak Brook Terrace, Illinois.
