= Joseph Fleming =

Joseph Fleming may refer to:

- Joseph Fleming (athlete)
- Joseph Fleming (politician)
- Joe Fleming, American player of Canadian football
