= Athletics at the 1904 Summer Olympics – Men's 1500 metres =

Men's 1500 metres at the Games of the III Olympiad
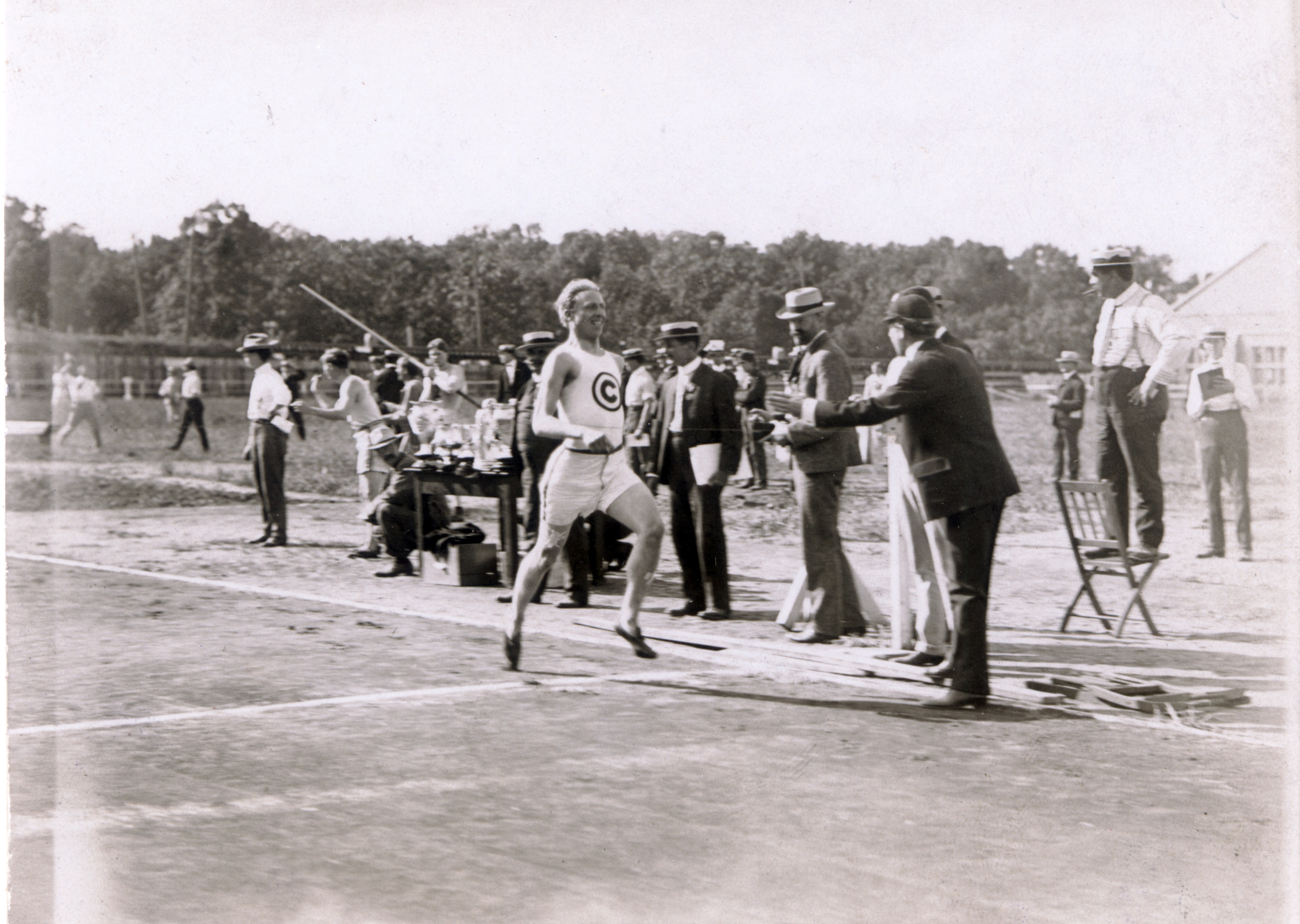
- Gold medalist Jim Lightbody at the finish line
- Venue: Francis Field
- Date: September 3, 1904
- Competitors: 9 from 3 nations
- Winning time: 4:05.4 WR

Medalists
1st place, gold medalist(s)		Jim Lightbody; United States
2nd place, silver medalist(s)		Frank Verner; United States
3rd place, bronze medalist(s)		Lacey Hearn; United States

The men's 1500 metres was a track and field athletics event held as part of the Athletics at the 1904 Summer Olympics program. It was the third time the event was held. 9 runners from 3 nations participated. The competition was held on September 3, 1904. The event was won by Jim Lightbody of the United States, completing his 1904 treble (800 metres, 1500 metres, and 2590 metres steeplechase). It was the first championship in the event for the United States. The Americans, with 7 of the 9 runners, swept the medals.

== Background ==
This was the third appearance of the event, which is one of 12 athletics events to have been held at every Summer Olympics. None of the runners from 1900 returned. The field again was fairly undistinguished; 1903 and 1904 AAA champion Alfred Shrubb of Great Britain and multiple AAU one-mile champion Alexander Grant of the United States did not compete. David Curtiss Munson, the 1904 AAU champion, was the favorite going into the Games, though Jim Lightbody's victories in the 800 metres and 2590 metres steeplechase made him a likely contender.

Canada made its first appearance in the event. The United States made its third appearance, the only nation to have also previously competed in 1896 and 1900.

== Competition format ==
The competition consisted of a single race.

The track was a cinder track The track was a cinder track 1/3 mile (536.448m) in length, with one long straightaway.

== Records ==
These were the standing world and Olympic records prior to the 1904 Summer Olympics.

World record	Charles Bennett (GBR)	4:06.2 (u)	Paris, France	15 July 1900
Olympic record	Charles Bennett (GBR)	4:06.2	Paris, France	15 July 1900

Jim Lightbody set a new Olympic record and a new unofficial world record at 4:05.4.

== Schedule ==
Date	Time	Round
Saturday, 3 September 1904		Final

== Results ==
Rank	Athlete	Nation	Time	Notes
1st place, gold medalist(s)	James Lightbody	United States	4:05.4	WR
2nd place, silver medalist(s)	Frank Verner	United States	4:06.8	
3rd place, bronze medalist(s)	Lacey Hearn	United States	Unknown	
4	David Munson	United States	Unknown	
5	Johannes Runge	Germany	Unknown	
6	Peter Deer	Canada	Unknown	
7	Howard Valentine	United States	Unknown	
8	Harvey Cohn	United States	Unknown	
9	Charles Bacon	United States	Unknown	
—	George Bonhag	United States	DNS	
—	Edward P. Carr	United States	DNS	
—	John Daly	Great Britain	DNS	
—	Bernard Gallagher	United States	DNS	
—	Alexander Grant	United States	DNS	
—	Will Gunn	New Zealand	DNS	

== Sources ==
- Wudarski, Pawel (1999). "Wyniki Igrzysk Olimpijskich" (in Polish).
