= Peter Deer =

Canadian middle-distance runner (1878–1956)

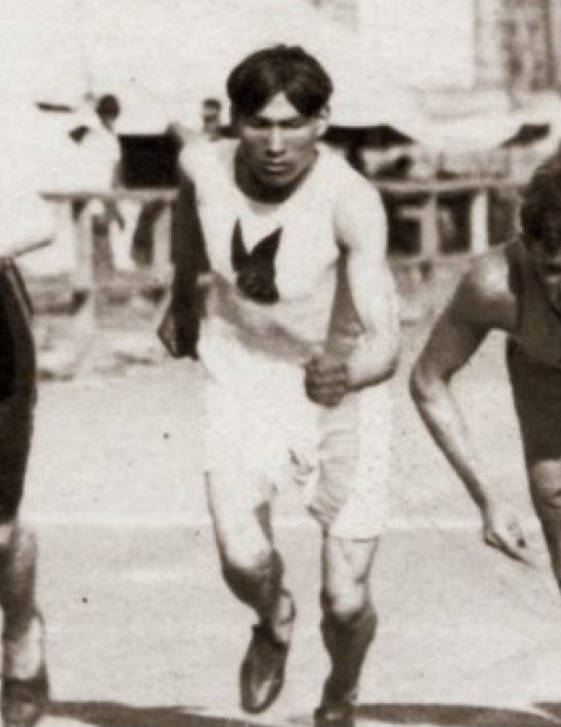

Personal information
- Full name: Peter Deer
- Born: 26 November 1878 Kahnawake, Canada
- Died: 30 July 1956 (aged 77) Verdun, Canada

Sport
- Sport: Middle-distance running

Peter Deer (26 November 1878 – 30 July 1956) was a Canadian middle-distance runner. Born in Kahnawake Mohawk Territory of Quebec, he initially worked as a mechanic before transitioning to running. He represented the Montreal Amateur Athletic Association and was selected for the Canadian team at the 1904 Summer Olympics. There, he became the first indigenous person to compete for Canada at the Olympic Games and in any international sporting competition.

== Biography ==
Peter Deer was born on 26 November 1878 in the Kahnawake Mohawk Territory of Quebec, Canada, on the south shore of St. Lawrence River. The Montreal Star states that Deer comes from a family of runners and is distantly related to American runner Deerfoot.

Working as a mechanic, he ran the mile for several years on the site of the Montreal Amateur Athletic Association (MAAA) but only joined the association in July 1904 and was trained by a man named Bennett, stating that Deer was "going to be one of the best distance runners he has ever had". The following month, he competed in the MAAA's midsummer games in order to be selected for the Canadian team at the 1904 Summer Olympics held in St. Louis, United States. There, he placed first in the men's 880-yard run and mile.

At the 1904 Summer Games, Deer was the first indigenous person to compete for Canada at the Olympic Games and in any international sporting competition. There, he competed in the men's 800 metres and failed to place, the men's 1500 metres and placed seventh, and the non-Olympic mile handicap race and placed third.

After the Summer Games, he enjoyed success at the local level for several years but retired from sport by the late 1900s. Deer later died on 30 July 1956 at the age of 77 from injuries sustained in a car accident that same year.
