= Johnny Joyce (athlete) =

American middle-distance runner

Johnny Joyce (August 22, 1876 – May 17, 1957) was an American track and field athlete who competed in the 1904 Summer Olympics. He competed in the 800 metres. He finished outside of the top six in what was a straight final.

== See also ==
- United States at the 1904 Summer Olympics
