= Harvey Cohn =

American middle-distance runner

Personal information
- Full name: Harvey Wright Cohn
- Born: December 4, 1884 New York, New York, U.S.
- Died: July 29, 1965 (aged 80) Grafton, Massachusetts, U.S.
- Height: 5 ft 8 in (173 cm)
- Weight: 134 lb (61 kg)

Sport
- Sport: Track and field
- Club: Irish-American Athletic Club

Harvey Wright Cohn (December 4, 1884 – July 29, 1965) was an American track and field athlete and a member of the Irish American Athletic Club. A native of New York City, Cohn competed in the 1904 Summer Olympics, the 1906 Intercalated Games in Athens and 1908 Summer Olympics in London.

An announcement in the August 6, 1904 issue of The New York Times indicated that the Metropolitan Association of the Amateur Athletic Union would hold a "special five-mile race" at Celtic Park on August 13, 1904 with the eight top finishers receiving a paid trip to compete in the marathon at the Olympic Games in St. Louis on August 30, 1904. Cohn was named as one of 19 "probable competitors" in the event.

In 1904 he was eighth in 1500 m competition. He also participated in the final of 800 m competition and in the final of 2590 meter steeplechase competition, but his exact placement in those races is unknown.

In 1905, he was the Amateur Athletic Union champion in the 2 mile steeplechase.

In the 1908 Olympic Games, 3 miles team race, he finished in twelfth place. As the last American to finish, he was not awarded silver medal. (Only three fastest of each team were awarded a medal).
