= Joseph Fleming (athlete) =

American sprinter

Sport
- Country: United States
- Sport: Track and field

Joseph S. Fleming (October 1, 1883 – November 1, 1960) was an American track and field athlete who competed in the 1904 Summer Olympics. In 1904 he was fourth in 400 m competition.
