= Arthur L. Newton =

American long-distance runner

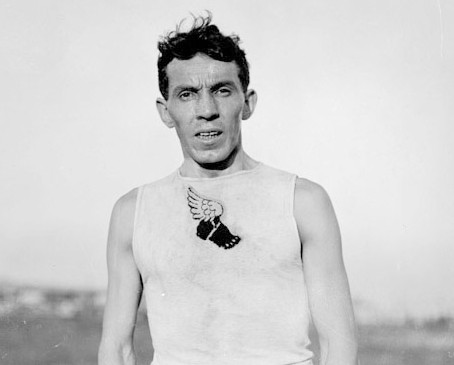
- Newton in 1904

Personal information
- Full name: Arthur Lee Newton
- Born: June 24, 1876 Woodstock, Vermont, U.S.
- Died: May 21, 1956 (aged 79) North Tarrytown, New York, U.S.
Medal record
Men's athletics
Representing the United States
Olympic Games
Gold medal – first place	1904 St. Louis	4 mile team
Bronze medal – third place	1904 St. Louis	2590 m steeplechase
Bronze medal – third place	1904 St. Louis	Marathon

Arthur Lee Newton (June 24, 1876 – May 21, 1956) was an American athlete who competed mainly in the distance events. He was born in Woodstock, Vermont, but moved to New Rochelle, New York in 1912, where he was an automobile dealer.

== Biography ==
He participated in the 1900 Summer Olympics in Paris in the 2,500 metre steeplechase finishing 4th and in the marathon finishing 5th.

He also competed for the United States in the 1904 Summer Olympics held in St. Louis, United States in the 4 mile team where he won the gold medal with his teammates George Underwood, Paul Pilgrim, 800 meter silver medalist Howard Valentine, and David Munson. He also won bronze medals in the marathon and 2,590 meter steeplechase.

He was married twice; his second wife was Frieda Muehlichen, and their daughter was Elaine. He died at Phelps Memorial Hospital in North Tarrytown, New York in 1956.
