= Frank Verner =

American long-distance runner

Medal record

Men's athletics

Olympic Games

Representing the United States
Silver medal – second place	1904 St. Louis	1500 metres

Representing a Mixed team
Silver medal – second place	1904 St Louis	4 mile team race

Lacey Hearn, James Lightbody, Mike Butler and Frank Verner at the 1904 Olympic Games

William Franklyn "Bill" Verner (June 24, 1883 – July 1, 1966) was an American athlete and middle-distance runner who competed in the early twentieth century.

Verner was born in Grundy County, Illinois.

He competed in Athletics at the 1904 Summer Olympics and won a silver medal in the 1500 metres in 4:06.8 behind James Lightbody, and a silver medal with the US Chicago team in the four mile race. In the 2590 metre steeplechase competition he finished fourth and in the 800 metres event he finished sixth.

He died in Pinckney, Michigan.
