= George Underwood (athlete) =

American athlete

Medal record

Men's athletics

Representing the United States

Olympic Games
Gold medal – first place	1904 St Louis	4 mile team race

George Bowker Underwood (November 4, 1884 – August 28, 1943) was an American athlete who competed in the 1904 Summer Olympics.

He competed for the United States in the 1904 Summer Olympics held in St Louis, United States in the 4 mile team where he won the gold medal with his teammates Arthur Newton, Paul Pilgrim, Howard Valentine and David Munson.

Underwood also finished fourth in the 800 metres competition and participated in the 400 metres event where his result is unknown.
