= Frank Waller (athlete) =

Athletics competitor

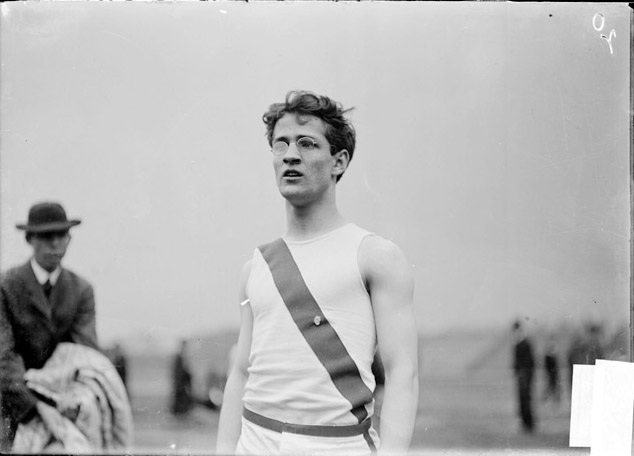

Medal record

Men's athletics

Representing the United States

Olympic Games
Silver medal – second place	1904 St. Louis	400 metres
Silver medal – second place	1904 St. Louis	400 metres hurdles

Frank Laird Waller (June 24, 1884 – November 29, 1941) was an American athlete who specialized in the 400 metres. He later became a vocal coach.

He competed in the early twentieth century. He won two silver medals in Athletics at the 1904 Summer Olympics in the men's 400 metres and 400 metre hurdles behind gold medalist Harry Hillman in both events, while a student at the University of Wisconsin. He was U.S. Champion in the men's 440 yards in 1905 and 1906, and the 220 yard hurdles while competing for the Milwaukee Athletic Club.

He graduated from Menomonie, Wisconsin High School, and later the University of Wisconsin in 1907. After his college graduation, Waller moved to Chicago. In Chicago he knew William T. Purdy and Carl Beck, who together wrote the University of Wisconsin fight song "On, Wisconsin!". Waller told Purdy about a contest and $100 prize to write a University of Minnesota fight song. Carl Beck convinced Purdy it should be presented to the University of Wisconsin as their fight song.

He went on tour with the singer Lillian Russell as her pianist. He spent several years in Germany conducting at provincial opera houses. From 1924 until 1925 he was pianist, coach, and theater conductor for the opera department at the Eastman School of Music in Rochester. He later served as a voice coach and headed the voice department at the Kansas City Conservatory of Music. During his career, he served as director of the Tri-City Symphony, Milwaukee Philharmonic Orchestra, the National Broadcasting Company in New York, and the WPA Orchestra in Richmond, Virginia. Among the singers he coached were Charles Sears, Edith Mason, Rosa Raisa, Alice Nielsen, Luisa Tetrazzini, Frances Peralta, and Olga Blani.

He died of a heart ailment after six weeks of illness at the hospital. He was unmarried.

Personal bests: 440y – 49.6 (1905); 400H – 53.6 (1904).
