= James Peck (athlete) =

Canadian middle-distance runner

James Baumann Peck (December 11, 1880 – June 22, 1955) was a Canadian track and field athlete who competed in the men's 800 metres for the Montreal Athletic Club.
