= Charles Bacon =

American athlete (1885–1968)

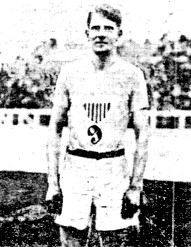
- Charles Bacon Jr. at the 1908 Olympic Games

Personal information
- Full name: Charles James Bacon Jr.
- Born: January 9, 1885 Brooklyn, New York, U.S.
- Died: November 15, 1968 (aged 83) Fort Lauderdale, Florida, U.S.
- Height: 6 ft 0 in (183 cm)
- Weight: 170 lb (77 kg)
Medal record
Men's athletics
Representing the United States
Olympic Games
Gold medal – first place	1908 London	400 m hurdles

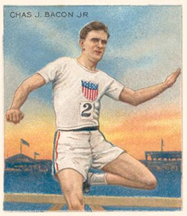
Charles Bacon on a 1910 Mecca Cigarettes trading card

Charles James Bacon Jr. (January 9, 1885 – November 15, 1968) was an American athlete and a member of the Irish American Athletic Club and the New York City Police Department. He won the 400 metres hurdles at the 1908 Summer Olympics.

He was born in Brooklyn, New York and died in Fort Lauderdale, Florida.

At the 1904 Summer Olympics he finished ninth in the 1500 metres event.

Two years later at the 1906 Summer Olympics he finished fifth in the 400 metres competition and sixth in the 800 metres event.

Just a month and a half before the 1908 Olympic Games in London, Bacon ran in Philadelphia setting a new unofficial world record of 55.8 in the 400 metre hurdles.

At the Olympic Games in 1908, he and fellow American Harry Hillman went over the last hurdle simultaneously, after which Bacon pulled away on the straight to win in a new world record of 55.0 seconds. This record was recognized by IAAF, thus Bacon became the first world record holder in the 400 metres hurdles. The same year, Bacon set the world record for the 440 yards, 10 hurdles, 3 feet 6 inches at Celtic Park, Queens, New York, the home of the Irish American Athletic Club on October 11, 1908.

== Notes ==
Records
Preceded by —	Men's 400 m hurdles World Record Holder; July 22, 1908 – June 26, 1920	Succeeded by (United States) John Norton
