= David Curtiss Munson =

Athletics competitor

David Munson
Medal record

Men's athletics

Representing the United States

Olympic Games
Gold medal – first place	1904 St. Louis	4 mile team race

David Curtiss Munson (May 19, 1884 – September 17, 1953) was an American athlete who competed in the 1904 Summer Olympics.

He competed for the United States in the 1904 Summer Olympics held in St Louis, United States in the 4 mile team where he won the gold medal with his teammates Arthur Newton, George Underwood, Paul Pilgrim and Howard Valentine.

In the 1500 metres event he finished fourth. He also participated in the 2590 metre steeplechase competition where he finished sixth.

He won back-to-back one-mile run titles at the outdoor IC4A championships in 1904 and again in 1905, and set the world record in the mile-and-a-half run in Madison Square Garden in 1905.

Munson graduated from Cornell University in 1906 and was a member of the Sphinx Head Society, the oldest senior honor society at Cornell University. He was inducted into the Cornell University Athletic Hall of Fame in 1988.
