= Johannes Runge =

German athlete (1878–1949)

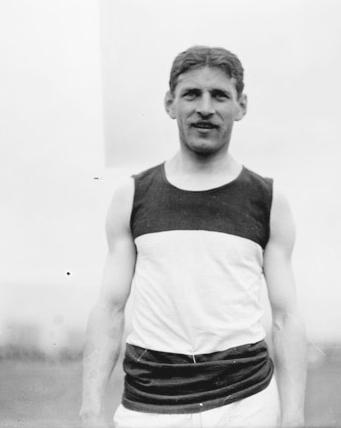
Runge at the 1904 Summer Olympics.

Johannes Runge (24 January 1878 in Braunschweig – 12 November 1949 in Bad Harzburg) was a German track and field athlete who competed in the 1904 Summer Olympics and in the 1906 Summer Olympics.

In 1904 he finished fifth in the 800 metres competition as well as in the 1500 metres event. He also participated in the 400 metres event but his exact result is unknown.

Two years later at the Intercalated Games he was eliminated in the first round of the 400 metres competition as well as of the 800 metres competition. In the long jump event he finished twelfth.

Between 1903 and 1914 he also served as the president of his sports club, Eintracht Braunschweig.
