= Lacey Hearn =

American athlete

Olympic medal record

Representing a Mixed team
Silver medal – second place	1904 St. Louis	4 mile team race

Representing the United States
Bronze medal – third place	1904 St. Louis	1500 metres

Lacey Hearn, James Lightbody, Mike Butler and Frank Verner at the 1904 Olympic Games

Lacey Earnest Hearn (March 23, 1881 – October 19, 1969 in Fort Wayne, Indiana) was an American athlete and middle-distance runner who competed in the early twentieth century. Individually he specialized in the 1500 Metres, and he won a bronze medal in Athletics at the 1904 Summer Olympics, held in St. Louis, Missouri, United States. Hearn's Compatriot James Lightbody took gold. Hearn was also a member of the American distance team which won the silver medal at the 1904 Olympics, competing in the Chicago American team in the 4-mile team race, consisting of James Lightbody, Frank Verner, Hearn, Albert Corey and Sidney Hatch.
