= Herman Groman =

American sprinter

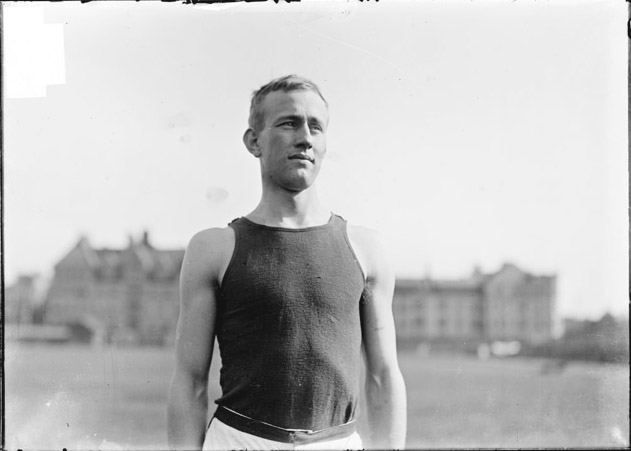

Medal record

Men's athletics

Representing the United States

Olympic Games
| Bronze medal – third place | 1904 St Louis | 400 metres |

Herman Charles Groman (August 18, 1882 – July 23, 1954) was an American athlete who competed mainly in the 400 metres for Yale University and the Chicago Athletic Club. He won a bronze medal in the 400 meters in the 1904 Olympics. He was a graduate of Yale University and Rush Medical College and later lived in Hammond, Indiana.
