= Howard Valentine =

Athletics competitor

Medal record

Men's athletics

Representing the United States

Olympic Games
| Gold medal – first place | 1904 St Louis | 4 mile team race |
| Silver medal – second place | 1904 St Louis | 800 metres |

Howard Van Nostrand Valentine (December 14, 1881 – June 25, 1932) was an American track and field athlete.

He competed for the United States in the 1904 Summer Olympics held in St Louis, United States in the 800 metres where he won the silver medal and in the 1500 metres event where he finished seventh.

He also competed for the New York Athletic Club team in the 4 mile team race against Chicago AA with teammates Arthur Newton, George Underwood, Paul Pilgrim and David Munson. They won the race and the gold medal.

In the 1906 Summer Olympics, at the Intercalated Games he was eliminated in the first round of the 400 metres and 800 metres events.

In 1911 his house was broken into and around 270 of his athletics cups and medals were stolen.

In 1932, upon suffering a heart attack, Valentine was admitted to the Broad Street Hospital in New York City where he later died. At the time of his death he was an office manager with the brokerage firm of E.C. Benedict & Co.
