= Emil Breitkreutz =

American middle-distance runner

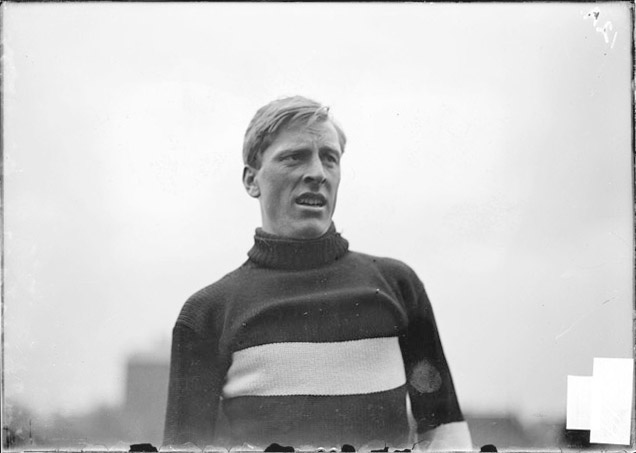

Medal record

Men's athletics

Representing the United States

Olympic Games
Bronze medal – third place	1904 St Louis	800 metres

Emil William Breitkreutz (November 16, 1883, in Wausau, Wisconsin – May 3, 1972, in San Gabriel, California) was an American middle-distance runner who won a bronze medal in the Olympic 800 meters final in the 1904 Summer Olympics in St. Louis, Missouri.

Breitkreutz attended the University of Southern California (USC), where he became the first USC athlete to compete in the Olympics. He graduated in 1906.

Breitkreutz was also the first head basketball coach at USC.
