= Paul Pilgrim =

American runner

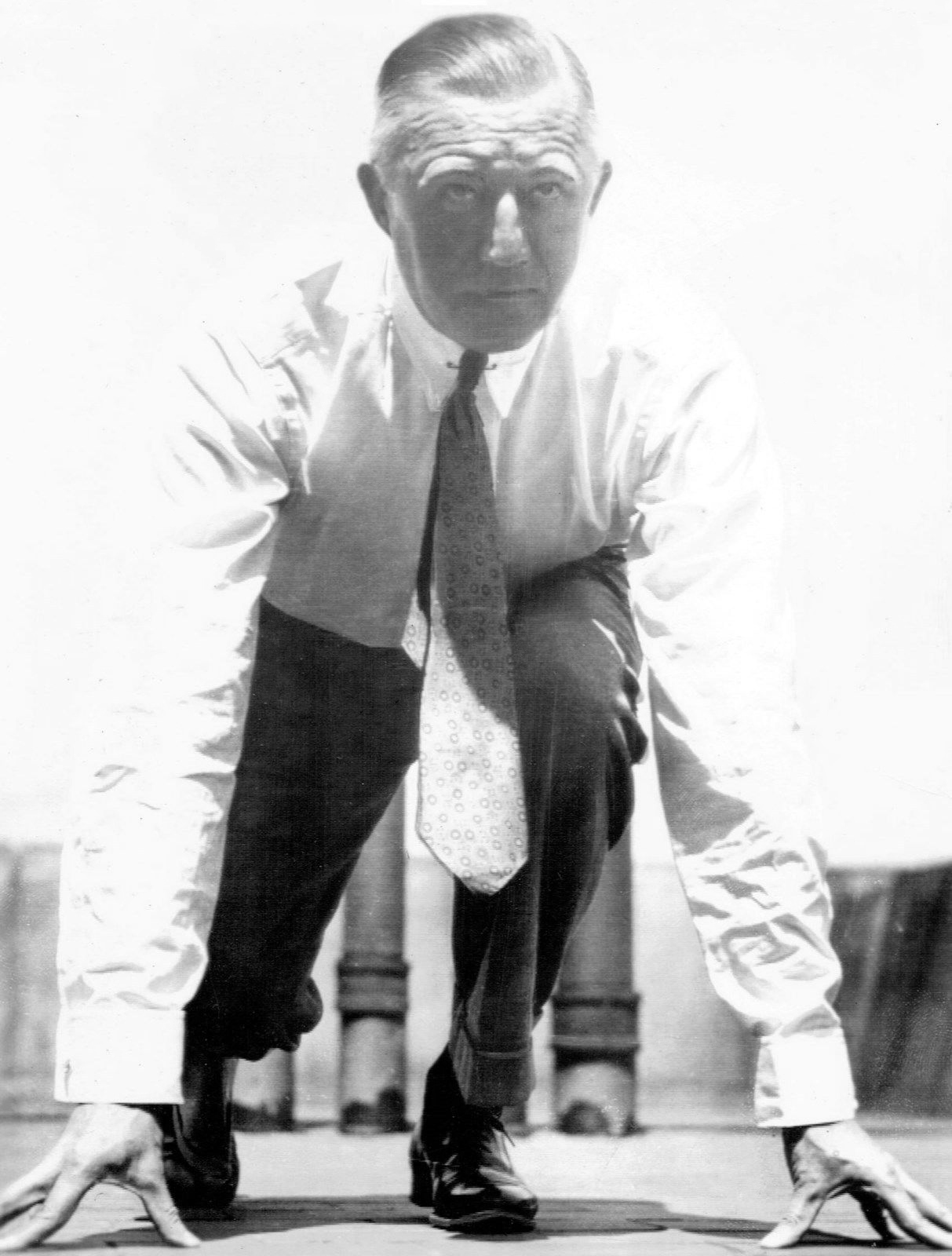
- Pilgrim as NYAC manager in 1936

Personal information
- Born: October 26, 1883 New York City, U.S.
- Died: January 8, 1958 (aged 74) White Plains, New York, U.S.
- Height: 180 cm (5 ft 11 in)
- Weight: 75 kg (165 lb)

Sport
- Sport: Athletics
- Event: Running
- Club: New York Athletic Club

Achievements and titles
- Personal bests: 400 m – 53.0 (1906); 800 m – 1:57.9 (1905)
Medal record
Representing the United States
Olympic Games
Gold medal – first place	1904 St. Louis	4 miles team
Intercalated Games
Gold medal – first place	1906 Athens	400 m
Gold medal – first place	1906 Athens	800 m

Paul Henry Pilgrim (October 26, 1883 – January 8, 1958) was an American runner. He competed at the 1904, 1906 and 1908 Olympics and won three gold medals in 1904 and 1906.

At the 1904 Summer Olympics, Pilgrim failed to complete the 400 m and 800 m events, and finished sixth in the four mile team run, aiding the New York Athletic Club (NYAC) to win the gold medal.

In 1906, Pilgrim traveled to Athens on his own, missing the wave that washed over the deck of the American team's ship in Gibraltar. The wave injured about half-dozen athletes aboard the deck, including one of the favorites in the 400 m, Harry Hillman. Pilgrim advanced to the final in the 400 m, and was third before the final straight. On that stretch, he passed Wyndham Halswelle of Great Britain and Nigel Barker of Australia to win in time of 53.2 seconds. In the 800 m, Pilgrim passed James Lightbody on the final lap and won by two feet. This medal does not appear in results or tables published by the International Olympic Committee, which retroactively downgraded the 1906 Summer Olympics and does not consider them to have been true "Games of the Olympiad."

Following his success in 1906 Pilgrim never won a major competition. At the 1908 Summer Olympics he failed to reach the final of the 400 m event. He worked the rest of his career at NYAC, where he served as Athletic Director from 1914 to 1953.

== Sources ==
- Cook, Theodore Andrea (1908). The Fourth Olympiad, Being the Official Report. London: British Olympic Association.
- De Wael, Herman (2001). "Athletics 1908". Herman's Full Olympians. Archived from the original on September 27, 2006.
- Wudarski, Pawel (1999). "Wyniki Igrzysk Olimpijskich" (in Polish).
