= Harry Hillman =

American athletics competitor

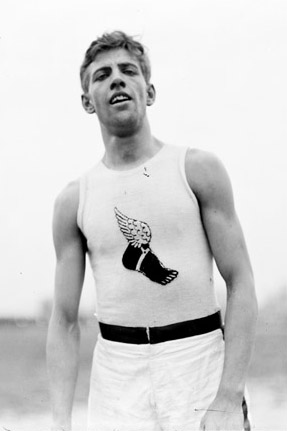
- Hillman in 1904

Personal information
- Full name: Harry Livingston Hillman Jr.
- Born: September 8, 1881 Brooklyn, New York, U.S.
- Died: August 9, 1945 (aged 63) Hanover, New Hampshire, U.S.
- Resting place: Pine Knoll Cemetery, Hanover
- Occupation: Dartmouth Track Coach
- Height: 180 cm (5 ft 11 in)
- Weight: 66 kg (146 lb) (Olympics)
- Spouse: Hazel Quantin
Medal record
Men's athletics
Representing the United States
Olympic Games
Gold medal – first place	1904 St. Louis	400 metres
Gold medal – first place	1904 St. Louis	200 metre hurdles
Gold medal – first place	1904 St. Louis	400 metres hurdles
Silver medal – second place	1908 London	400 metres hurdles

Harry Livingston Hillman Jr. (September 8, 1881 – August 9, 1945) was one of the longest serving Dartmouth Track and Field Coaches from 1910–45, and an American track and field athlete who won three gold medals at the 1904 Summer Olympics and a silver at the 1908 Summer Olympics.

== Biography ==
Born in Brooklyn, New York, Hillman was a member of three Olympic teams at the turn of the century. He also was a coach at Dartmouth College and was an associate Track coach for the American Olympic Team for three Olympics from 1924-32.

=== Early life ===
In his youth, after Hillman graduated Boys High School of Brooklyn, he was a bank teller at New York's Bank of North America and later served for a few years as a stockbroker and salesman. His achievements in Track allowed him to join the Star Athletic Club of Long Island City and then the Knickerbocker Athletic Club in 1899, later joining the New York Athletic Club, in 1902, where he could compete with top athletes and receive quality coaching. Like Lawson Robertson, and several other New York athletes, he served as a Lieutenant in the National Guard of New York—Company E of the old 13th Regiment of Brooklyn. Robertson, who became a University of Pennsylvania track coach, was on several Olympic Teams with Hillman, and was also a graduate of Brooklyn Boys School.

Hillman’s first major titles came in the 1902 AAU junior and senior 220-yard hurdles, and the following year he added the AAU senior title in the open quarter mile.

=== 1904 Olympics ===
Hillman won three gold medals at the 1904 Olympics in St. Louis, Missouri, taking the flat 400 metres, the 200 metres hurdles and the 400 metres hurdles. He had Olympic record times in all three events, but he tripped one hurdle in the 400 metres, which meant that his time of 53.0 seconds could not be counted as a world record (the record had stood at 57.2 seconds since 1891). In addition, the race was run over hurdles that were too low at 76 centimetres instead of the normal 91,4.

=== 1906 Olympics ===
En route to Athens, Greece for the 1906 Summer Olympics, he was one of a half-dozen athletes who were injured by an enormous wave that washed over the deck of the ship. The injury to his knee diminished the quality of his performance. He finished fifth in the 400 metres, his only event that year.

=== 1908 Olympics ===
Hillman won a silver medal in the 400 metres hurdles at the 1908 Summer Olympics, setting a short-lived record in the second round. He and Charles Bacon of the USA went over the last hurdle simultaneously, but Bacon won the run to the tape to win in a world record 55.0 seconds. Hillman's time in the race was 55.3 seconds.

He was married in May 1908 to Hazel Quantin of Brooklyn, who survived him with their son, Harold Quantin, a 1940 Dartmouth graduate, and their daughter, Madeleine Rogers Hillman.

Harry Hillman at 17 (left) and Lawson Robertson (right) in three-legged race, April 1909

On April 24, 1909, at the Military Games, Hillman and his friend Lawson Robertson set a record that has never been equaled, running the 100 yards (91 m) three-legged race in 11.0 seconds. At those same Military Games on April 24, 1909, he entered six events and won five of them: the 100 yards, 220 yards, 440 yards, and 220 yard hurdles. He won four Amateur Athletic Union titles, two each in the 200 metres and 400 metres hurdles.

Hillman later served in World War I as a lieutenant in the aviation corps.

=== Dartmouth Track coach ===
The focal point of his career was serving as the track and field and cross-country coach at Dartmouth College for 35 years, from 1910 until his death in 1945. Hillman was elected an assistant professor of physical education at Dartmouth in 1919 and as assistant professor, without limitations, in 1922. He served as chairman of the department from 1921 to 1925.

In addition to his responsibilities as a track coach, he occasionally coached the Dartmouth football team, likely in conditioning. At Dartmouth, Hillman advised hurdlers to swallow raw eggs, which he believed to be "excellent for the wind and stomach." Some of the track athletes who were hurdlers or runners, sports in which he excelled, that he developed at Dartmouth were Don Burnham '44 in the mile; Gus Braun '15, Monty Wells '28, and Jack Donovan '38, in the hurdles. In the high jump, intercollegiate champions he trained included Russ Palmer '10, Roy Brown '23, and Tom Maynard '29. He also trained Mark Wright '13, C. E. Buck '13 and Laddy Myers '20 in the pole vault; Bud Whitney '15, Jack Shelburne '19, W. C. Beers '21, and Tony Geniawicz '37 in the shot.

=== Olympic coach ===
He was on the Olympic track and field coaching staff in 1924, 1928, and 1932 Summer Olympics, as well as acting as trainer for the American Davis Cup team in 1935 where he convinced the players of the value of taking salt tablets to replace lost water. One of his most famous athletes was Canadian hurdler Earl Thomson, Dartmouth Class of 22, the winner of the gold medal in the 110 metres hurdles at the 1920 Summer Olympics. In 1930, Hillman, along with Thomson and Harold Barron, was involved in the design of a new safer hurdle, with a view to reducing the danger of bad falls and injuries.

Hillman also served as Secretary-Treasurer of the College Track Coaches Association of America. He wrote many articles on Track and Conditioning for newspapers and magazines that included The Boston Herald, The New York Times, The Athletic Journal, and The Scholastic Coach.

Hillman died at Dick's House, the College Infirmary at Dartmouth College on August 9, 1945 in Hanover, New Hampshire, from what was diagnosed at the time as a heart ailment, coronary thrombosis. He was buried at Pine Knoll Cemetery in Hannover, and his gravestone marks his years as Dartmouth Track Coach, 1910-45.
