= Jim Lightbody =

American middle-distance runner

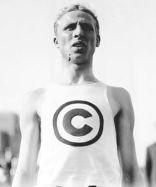
- James Lightbody

Medal record

Men's athletics

Representing the United States

Olympic Games
| Gold medal – first place | 1904 St. Louis | 800 metres |
| Gold medal – first place | 1904 St. Louis | 1500 metres |
| Gold medal – first place | 1904 St. Louis | 2590 m Steeplechase |

Representing a Mixed team
| Silver medal – second place | 1904 St. Louis | Four Mile Team |

Intercalated Games
| Gold medal – first place | 1906 Athens | 1500 metres |
| Silver medal – second place | 1906 Athens | 800 metres |

Lacey Hearn, James Lightbody, Mike Butler and Frank Verner at the 1904 Olympic Games

James Davies Lightbody (March 16, 1882 – March 2, 1953) was an American middle-distance runner, winner of six Olympic medals (two of which are no longer recognized by the International Olympic Committee following its downgrading of the 1906 Intercalated Games) in the early 20th century.

Lightbody, born in Pittsburgh and graduating from Central High School in Muncie, Indiana, had great success at the 1904 Summer Olympics, held in St. Louis, Missouri, United States. He was not favoured in any of the three individual events in which he competed, but nevertheless won all three.

First, he won the 2590 metre steeplechase, and then sprinting to the 800 metres title days later. Finally, he won the 1500 metres in a new world record. Later that day, he added a second place to his tally, when he competed with the Chicago Athletic Association in the 4-mile team event.

In 1905, Lightbody won AAU titles in both the 800 and 1500 metres, and the following year he competed in his second Olympics, the 1906 Intercalated Games of in Athens. He successfully defended his 1500 metres title, and placed second in the 800 metres.

Lightbody competed again in the 1908 Summer Olympics. In the 800 metres, he placed only fourth in his first round heat. Lightbody lost a close race to fellow American James Sullivan in the first round of the 1500 metres, eliminating him from further competition. He was defeated by a mere ten yards by Harry Sewell in the first round of the 3200 metre steeplechase and did not qualify for the final.

Lightbody died in 1953, two weeks short of his 71st birthday in Charleston, South Carolina.

== Sources ==
- Cook, Theodore Andrea (1908). The Fourth Olympiad, Being the Official Report. London: British Olympic Association.
- De Wael, Herman (2001). "Athletics 1908". Herman's Full Olympians. Archived from the original on 27 September 2006.
- Wudarski, Pawel (1999). "Wyniki Igrzysk Olimpijskich" (in Polish). Archived from the original on 16 February 2009.
- Evans, Hilary; Gjerde, Arild; Heijmans, Jeroen; Mallon, Bill; et al. "Jim Lightbody". Olympics at Sports-Reference.com. Sports Reference LLC. Archived from the original on 2013-04-30.
