= Holloway (surname) =

Family name

Holloway is an English surname.

== Notable people with the surname include ==
=== A ===
- Adam Holloway (born 1965), English politician
- Aden Holloway (born 2004), American basketball player
- A. J. Holloway (c.1939–2018), American politician
- Alicia Holloway (born 1996), American ballerina and television personality
- Ariel Williams Holloway (1905–1973), American poet

=== B ===
- Baliol Holloway (died 1967), English stage actor
- Beatrice Denver Holloway (1884–1964), Australian actress
- Beth Holloway (born c. 1961), mother of missing American student Natalee Holloway
- Brenda Holloway (born 1946), American singer and songwriter
- Bronwyn Holloway-Smith (born 1982), New Zealand artist and author
- Bruce K. Holloway (1912–1999), United States Air Force general
- Bryan R. Holloway (born 1977), American politician from North Carolina

=== C ===
- Charles Holloway (disambiguation), several people, including:

- Charles Holloway (cricketer) (1789–1846), English professional cricketer
- Sir Charles Holloway (engineer) (1749–1827), major-general in the Royal Engineers
- Charles Holloway (stage) (1848–1908), Australian actor and manager
- Charles A. Holloway, American professor and business executive
- Charles E. Holloway (died 1962), namesake for Camp Holloway

- Clyde C. Holloway (1943–2016), American politician
- Condredge Holloway (born 1946), American athlete

=== D ===
- Dylan Holloway (born 2001), Canadian ice hockey player

=== E ===
- Edmund Holloway (c. 1820–1906), Australian actor
- Edward E. Holloway (1908–1993), American physician and politician
- Edward James Holloway (1875–1967), Australian politician
- Ella Virginia Houck Holloway (1862–1940), American socialite and clubwoman
- Elsie Holloway (1882–1971), Canadian photographer

=== G ===
- Grant Holloway (born 1997), Gold Olympic Hurdler

=== H ===
- Henry Holloway (disambiguation), multiple people

=== I ===
- Ian Holloway (born 1963), English football manager
- Isaac Holloway (1805–1885), American politician from Ohio

=== J ===
- Jack Holloway (1875–1967), Australian politician
- James L. Holloway Jr. (1898–1984), United States Navy admiral
- James L. Holloway III (1922–2019), United States Navy admiral
- Jennifer Holloway, American operatic mezzo-soprano and soprano
- John Holloway (disambiguation), multiple people

- John Holloway (athlete) (1878–1950), Irish Olympic decathlete
- John Holloway (botanist) (1881–1945), New Zealand Anglican priest, botanist
- John Holloway (diplomat) (1943–2013), Australian diplomat
- John Holloway (musician) (born 1948), British baroque violinist
- John Holloway (poet) (1920–1999), British academic and poet
- John Holloway (Royal Navy officer) (1744–1826), British governor of Newfoundland
- John Holloway (sociologist) (born 1947), Marxist writer
- John Holloway (Virginia politician) (1666–1734), mayor of Williamsburg, Virginia
- John Chandler Holloway (1826–1901), member Wisconsin State Assembly and State Senate
- John Thorpe Holloway (1914–1977), New Zealand alpine explorer and forest ecologist

- Jonathan Holloway (disambiguation), multiple people

- Jonathan Holloway (artistic director) (born 1970), British festival director
- Jonathan Holloway (historian) (born 1967), American historian and President of Rutgers University
- Jonathan Holloway (playwright) (born 1955), English playwright and theatre director

- Jordan Holloway (born 1996), American baseball player
- Josephine Groves Holloway (1898–1988), first African-American woman in scouting in Tennessee
- Josh Holloway (born 1969), American actor
- Julian Holloway (1944–2025), British comedy actor, son of Stanley Holloway

=== L ===
- Laura Carter Holloway (1843–1930), American journalist, author, and lecturer
- Laurie Holloway (1938–2025), English pianist, musical director and composer
- Liddy Holloway (1947–2004), New Zealand actress
- Loleatta Holloway (1946–2011), American gospel singer

=== M ===
- Max Holloway (born 1991), American mixed martial artist
- Mila Holloway (born 2006), American basketball player

=== N ===
- Nancy Holloway (1932–2019), American jazz singer
- Natalee Holloway (born 1986), American who disappeared in Aruba in May 2005

=== P ===
- Patrice Holloway (1951–2006), American soul and pop singer

=== R ===
- Ralph Holloway (1935–2025), American physical anthropologist
- Red Holloway (1927–2012), American blues and jazz saxophonist
- Richard Holloway (born 1933), Scottish writer, broadcaster and Bishop of Edinburgh
- Robin Holloway (born 1943), English composer
- Ron Holloway (born 1953), American tenor saxophonist

=== S ===
- Shaheen Holloway (born 1976), American basketball player and coach
- Stanley Holloway (1890–1982), British actor and comic entertainer
- Sterling Holloway (1905–1992), American voice actor

=== T ===
- Thomas Holloway (1800–1883), English patent medicine vendor and philanthropist
- Tu Holloway (born 1989), American basketball player for Maccabi Rishon LeZion

=== V ===
- Vernon Caryle Holloway Sr. (1919–2000), American politician from Florida

=== W ===
- William J. Holloway (1888–1970), American principal, lawyer, and politician
- William James Holloway (1843–1913), Australian actor in London and South Africa
- William Judson Holloway Jr. (1923–2014) United States federal judge, son of the politician
- William Holloway (cricketer) (1870–1907), British army officer and England cricketer

== Fictional characters ==
- Grace Holloway, character in 1996 British television movie Doctor Who
- Joan Holloway (born 1931), character in American television series Mad Men
- Marcus Holloway, the protagonist of the 2017 video game Watch Dogs 2
- Zoe Holloway (Dominion), character in American television series Dominion
