= John Holloway =

John Holloway may refer to:

- John Holloway (Virginia politician) (1666–1734), mayor of Williamsburg, Virginia, 1722–1723
- John Holloway (Royal Navy officer) (1744–1826), British colonial official and governor of Newfoundland, 1807–1809
- John Chandler Holloway (1826–1901), member of the Wisconsin State Assembly and the Wisconsin State Senate
- John Holloway (athlete) (1878–1950), British Olympic decathlete
- John Holloway (botanist) (1881–1945), New Zealand Anglican priest, botanist and university lecturer
- John Thorpe Holloway (1914–1977), New Zealand alpine explorer and forest ecologist
- John Holloway (poet) (1920–1999), British academic and poet
- John Holloway (diplomat) (1943–2013), Australian diplomat
- John Holloway (sociologist) (born 1947), Marxist writer
- John Holloway (musician) (born 1948), British baroque violinist
- John Holloway (geneticist)

== See also ==
- Jonathan Holloway (disambiguation), multiple people
