= John Holloway (geneticist) =

Professor of Allergy and Respiratory Genetics

- Born: John William Holloway
- Education: University of Otago
- Relatives: Linda Holloway (mother); Jack Holloway (grandfather); John Holloway (great-grandfather)
- Scientific career
- Workplaces: University of Southampton
- Thesis: Studies of the genetic basis of atopic asthma (1998)
- Doctoral advisor: Graham Le Gros; Stephen Holgate

John William Holloway is a geneticist based at the University of Southampton, where he is professor of allergy and respiratory genetics, and was appointed associate vice-president interdisciplinary research in 2021. He leads a research team based within the human genetics and medical genomics theme of the School of Human Development & Health, Faculty of Medicine. Holloway is a Fellow of the Higher Education Academy.

== Education ==
Holloway obtained a BSc degree in biochemistry from the University of Otago in New Zealand in 1992. He then went on to carry out research with the University of Southampton and the Malaghan Institute, which resulted in his gaining a PhD from the University of Otago in 1997. His thesis focussed on the genetic basis of atopic asthma.

== Career ==
Holloway returned to the University of Southampton in 1997 and worked with Stephen Holgate. The main focus of his research was the genetics behind asthma and allergies. He currently leads the Respiratory Genetics Group in the University of Southampton's Faculty of Medicine. He was appointed to a chair of the Faculty of Medicine in 2011.

Holloway was previously on the Scientific Advisary boards for Asthma UK, and was a member of the Council for the British Society of Allergy and Clinical Immunology from 2009 to 2012. He is currently associate vice-president interdisciplinary research and sat on the council of the University of Southampton (2018–24). He was also previously Associate Dean (Enterprise and International) and Associate Dean (Research) for the Faculty of Medicine, University of Southampton.

=== Selected publications ===
- Holgate, ST; Davies, DE; Rorke, S; et al. (August 2004). "ADAM 33 and its association with airway remodeling and hyperresponsiveness in asthma". Clin Rev Allergy Immunol. 27 (1): 23–34. doi:10.1385/CRIAI:27:1:023. PMID 15347848..
- Erb, KJ; Holloway, JW; Sobeck, A; Moll, H; Le Gros, G (1998). "Infection of mice with Mycobacterium bovis-Bacillus Calmette-Guérin (BCG) suppresses allergen-induced airway eosinophilia". J Exp Med. 187 (4): 561–9. doi:10.1084/jem.187.4.561. PMC 2212158. PMID 9463406..
- Holloway, JW; Yang, IA; Holgate, ST (2010). "Genetics of allergic disease". J Allergy Clin Immunol. 125 (2): S81-94. doi:10.1016/j.jaci.2009.10.071. PMID 20176270..
- Granell, R; Curtin, JA; Haider, S; Kitaba, NT; Mathie, SA; Gregory, LG; Yates, LL; Tutino, M; Hankinson, J; Perretti, M; Vonk, JM; Arshad, HS; Cullinan, P; Fontanella, S; Roberts, GC; Koppelman, GH; Simpson, A; Turner, SW; Murray, CS; Lloyd, CM; Holloway, JW; Custovic, A (2023). "A meta-analysis of genome-wide association studies of childhood wheezing phenotypes identifies ANXA1 as a susceptibility locus for persistent wheezing". eLife. 12 e84315. doi:10.7554/eLife.84315. PMC 10292845. PMID 37227431..
- Kitaba, NT; Knudsen, GTM; Johannessen, A; Rezwan, FI; Malinovschi, A; Oudin, A; Benediktsdottir, B; Martino, D; González, FJC; Gómez, LP; Holm, M; Jõgi, NO; Dharmage, SC; Skulstad, SM; Watkins, SH; Suderman, M; Gómez-Real, F; Schlünssen, V; Svanes, C; Holloway, JW (2023). "Fathers' preconception smoking and offspring DNA methylation". Clin Epigenetics. 15 (1) 131. doi:10.1186/s13148-023-01540-7. PMC 10469907. PMID 37649101..

== Personal life ==
Holloway is the son of Scottish anatomical pathologist Linda Holloway and forester John Stevenson Holloway, and the grandson of alpine explorer and forest ecologist John Thorpe Holloway. He is married to Judith Holloway, also a professor at Southampton, with whom he has two children.
