= Senator Holloway =

Senator Holloway may refer to:

- Isaac Holloway (1805–1885), Ohio State Senate
- John Chandler Holloway (1826–1901), Wisconsin State Senate
- Vernon Holloway (1919–2000), Florida State Senate
- William J. Holloway (1888–1970), Oklahoma State Senate
