= John Sheedy (director) =

Australian theatre and film director

John Sheedy is an Australian theatre, film, and television director. His notable theatre productions include Suzie Miller's Driving into Walls and the stage adaptation of Colin Thiele's novel Storm Boy. He has worked with many major Australian theatre companies, including Belvoir Street Theatre and Sydney Theatre Company, and was artistic director of Barking Gecko Theatre Company in Perth. His debut feature film, H Is for Happiness, won the CinefestOZ Film Prize in 2019.

== Early life and education ==
John Sheedy was educated at the National Institute of Dramatic Art (NIDA).

== Career ==
=== Theatre ===
Sheedy is a director of drama, musicals, and opera.

He has worked with many Australian theatre companies. For Belvoir Street Theatre, Sheedy directed Sarah Kane's play Blasted; Lawrence Mooney's Sink or Swim; and Patricia Cornelius' play Love ( 2006 ). He was also assistant director on The Lieutenant of Inishmore with Neil Armfield (2004). He directed a season of Mark Ravenhill's play Some Explicit Polaroids at Darlinghurst Theatre.

For the Sydney Theatre Company (STC), Sheedy was assistant director to Richard Cottrell on Ying Tong – A Walk with the Goons, and assisted Julian Meyrick on Doubt for its national tour. He directed several rehearsed play readings of the winning scripts for the Patrick White Awards. He directed an adaptation by Tom Holloway of Colin Thiele's novel Storm Boy, as a co-production with the STC in 2013 and 2015.

In 2008, 2009, and 2010 Sheedy directed the Actors at Work Program for the Bell Shakespeare Company touring across Australia. For Parramatta Riverside, he directed Suzie Miller's All The Blood And All The Water and Far Away for Black Swan Theatre Company, before directing the premiere of the new musical Risky Lunar Love at Sydney's Carriageworks. In 2008 Sheedy spent three months in New York assisting Edward Albee on a workshop of his play Me, Myself And I, before working with Cicely Berry at the National Theatre Studio script development in London. For Griffin, Sheedy directed Tiger Country, and in 2009 Neil LaBute's The Distance From Here.

In his first season as the artistic director of Barking Gecko Theatre Company, Sheedy wrote for the stage and directed The Amber Amulet adapted from the book by Craig Silvey, which premiered in 2011. In the same year, he directed a stage adaptation of Shaun Tan's children's book The Red Tree, which was adapted by Sheedy with designer Gypsy Taylor and premiered at Barking Gecko Theatre Company in 2011, and re-produced for the 2012 Perth International Arts Festival.

In 2012 he also directed Susie Miller's Driving into Walls for the 2012 Perth International Arts Festival. The production then toured to the Sydney Opera House and Parramatta Riverside Theatres in June 2013. Under his direction, Barking Gecko Theatre Company was nominated for many Helpmann Awards, including Best Children's Presentation. In 2013, Sheedy directed Hamlet as part of a multi-year partnership with the Western Australian Academy of Performing Arts. He also adapted and directed Wolf Erlbruch's book Duck, Death And The Tulip as part of the 2013 Perth International Arts Festival.

In 2014, Sheedy and playwright Suzie Miller returned to Perth International Arts Festival with a sequel for Driving into Walls called onefivezeroseven, whose script was drawn from interviews with teenagers across Australia, and later in the year Sheedy directed a season of Kate Mulvany's adaptation of Craig Silvey's 2009 novel Jasper Jones. In 2015, Sheedy adapted and directed The Rabbits, a co-production of Opera Australia and Barking Gecko Theatre Company presented by the 2015 Perth International Arts Festival, featuring Kate Miller-Heidke.

=== Film and television ===
Sheedy's debut feature film, H Is for Happiness premiered at the 2019 Melbourne International Film Festival, and went on to win the CinefestOZ Film Prize. John's second feature film RUNT, based on a novel by Craig Silvey of the same name, was the third-highest grossing film of 2024.

He was set-up director on the 2023 ABC drama series In Our Blood.

== Other activities ==
- 2015 – Publication of Why Theatre? Revitalise Platform Paper by Sheedy with Jonathan Holloway (Playlab and Drama Queensland)
- 2014 – Keynote speaker for Revitalize 2014, Drama Queensland Professional Development Conference
- 2014 – Serving board member of the course advisory group for the Masters of Fine Arts undergraduate studies, NIDA
- 2013 – Judging panel, Patrick White Award, STC
- 2010–2014 Founding board member of The Dog Theatre, Melbourne
- 2007–2011 – Audition Selection Panel for the full-time Acting course, NIDA
- 2025 – Jury panel member, Adelaide Film Festival

== Awards ==
- 2006 – Sydney Theatre Critics Award, Best Production, Love
- 2006 – Sydney Theatre Critics Award, Best Production, Some Explicit Polaroids
- 2008 – Mike Walsh Fellowship
- 2012 – Nominated, Helpmann Award for Best Presentation for Children, The Red Tree
- 2013 – WA Equity Awards Nomination, Best production, Driving into Walls
- 2014 – Sydney Theatre Critics Award, Best Production, Storm Boy
- 2014 – Winner, Glugs Award, Best Production, Storm Boy
- 2014 – Nominated, Helpmann Award, Best Presentation for Children, Storm Boy
- 2014 – Winner, WA Equity Award, Best Direction for a Play, Duck, Death and the Tulip
- 2014 – Winner, WA Equity Award, Best Direction for a play, Storm Boy
- 2015 – WA Equity Award, Best Director for a play, Onefivezeroseven
- 2015 – WA Equity Award, Best Direction for a play, Jasper Jones
- 2015 – Helpmann Award, Best New Australian Work, The Rabbits
- 2015 – Helpmann Award, Best Presentation for Children, "The Rabbits"
- 2024 – CinefestOZ Film Prize, for H Is for Happiness

== Selected theatre productions ==
- 2006 – Love by Patricia Cornelius, Belvoir Street Theatre
- 2007 – Blasted by Sarah Kane, Belvoir Street Theatre
- 2008 – Some explicit Polaroids by Mark Ravenhill, Belvoir Street Theatre
- 2009 – Tiger Country by Jonathan Gavin, Griffin Theatre Company
- 2009 – Far Away by Caryl Churchill, Black Swan State Theatre Company
- 2010 – Attempts on her life by Martin Crimp, NIDA
- 2012 – Driving into Walls by Suzie Miller, Perth International Arts Festival and Sydney Opera House
- 2013, 2015 – Storm Boy, Adaptation by Tom Holloway, Sydney Theatre Company
- 2014 – Jasper Jones, Adaptation by Kate Mulvany, Barking Gecko Theatre Company.
- 2015 – The Rabbits, libretto by Lally Katz, Opera Australia
