= Driving into Walls =

Play by Suzie Miller

- Promotional poster
- Original language: English
- Written by: Suzie Miller
- Characters: Paige, Darren, John, Emma
- Subject: Teenage relationships
- Genre: Drama

Premiere
- Date: 2012
- Place: Australia

Driving into Walls (2012) is a play written by Suzie Miller and produced by Barking Gecko Theatre Company.

== Development ==
Miller and director John Sheedy interviewed over 500 Western Australian teens for the play, asking about their day-to-day lives and drawing from that many of the stories of the play.

== Plot ==
The plot of the story focuses on five teenagers and their online and offline relationships. The story does not follow a linear narrative and is more a collection of short stories with a shared message than one complete story.

== Performances ==
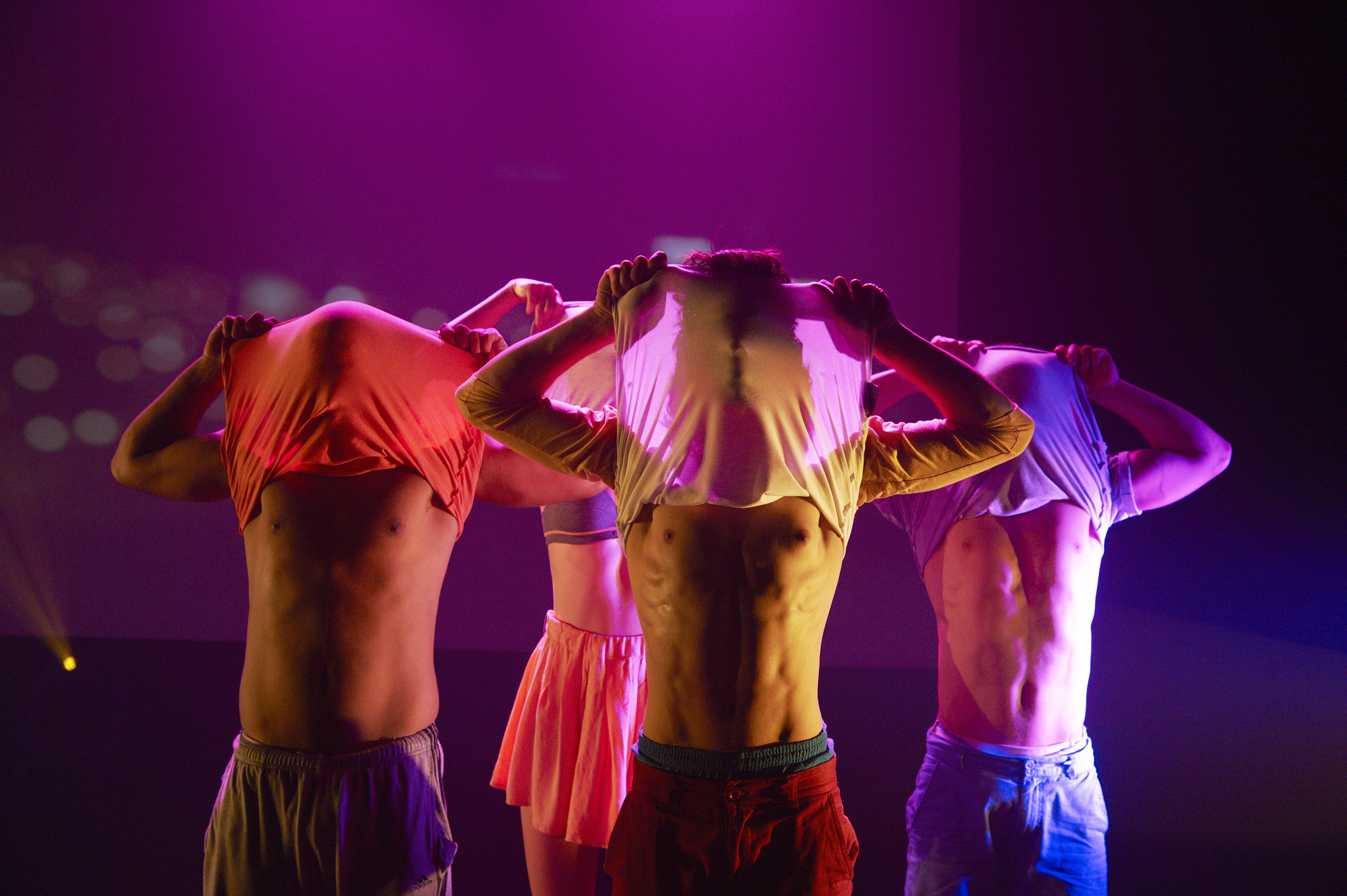
Dress rehearsal, February 2012.

Under the direction of John Sheedy, the show was first performed as part of the 2012 Perth International Arts Festival. It was later performed in the State Theatre Centre of Western Australia in the Underground studio.

=== Cast and production team ===
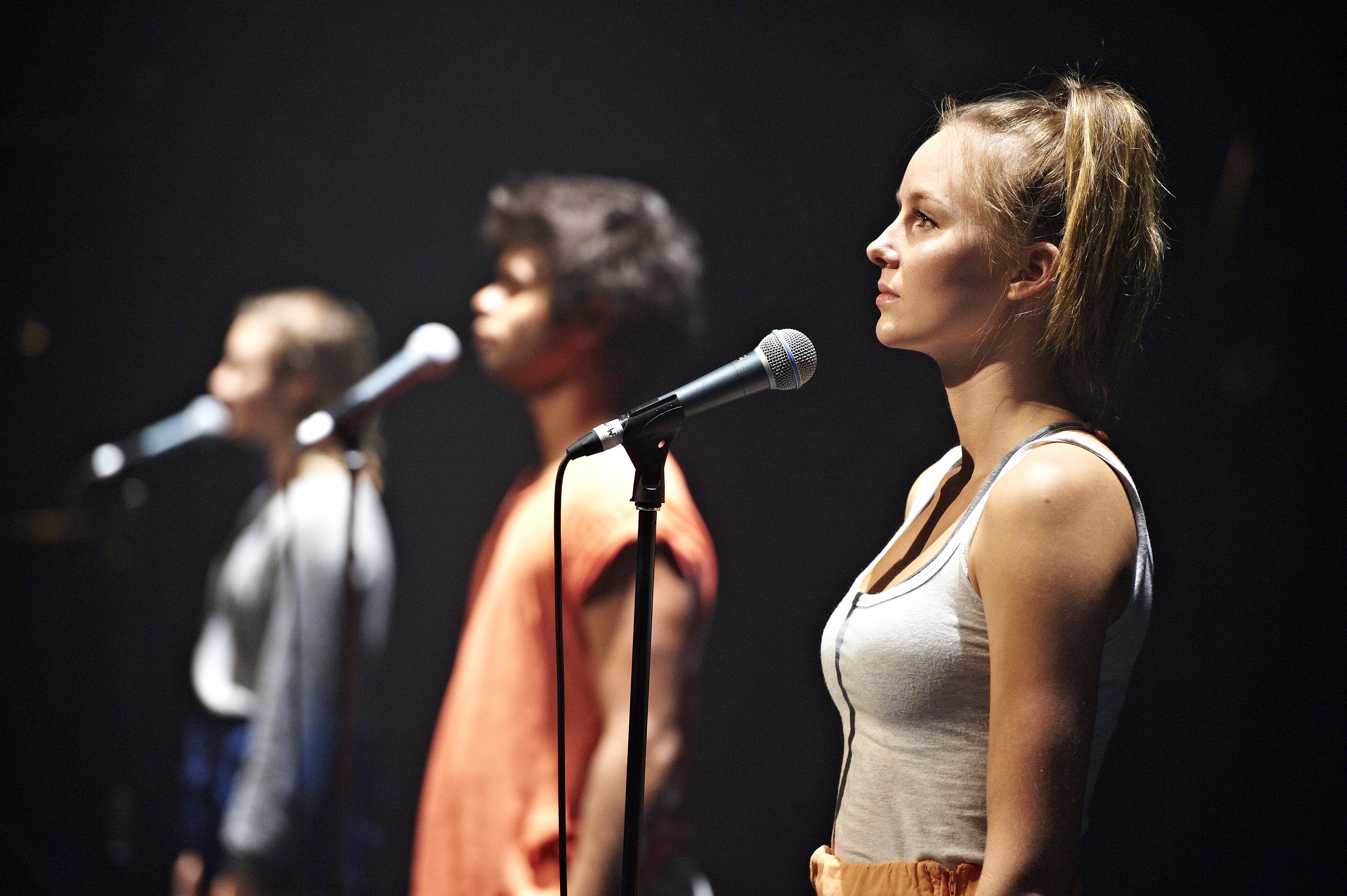
Thalia Livingstone, Michael Smith and Rikki Bremner

- Cast:
  - Michael Smith
  - Harrison Elliott
  - Matthew Tupper
  - Rikki Bremner
  - Thalia Livingstone
- Choreographer: Danielle Micich
- Production Manager: Jenna Boston
- Stage Manager: Chris Isaacs
- Lighting Designer: Matt Marshall
- Sound Designer: Kingsley Reeve
- Digital Artist: Sohan Hayes
- Assistant Digital Artist: Glen Adams
- Costume Designer: Alicia Clements
- Vocal Coach: Luzita Fereday
