= Judith Holloway =

Professor of Allergy

- Education: University of Southampton
- Scientific career
- Institutions: University of Southampton
- Thesis: Developing methods for the identification and isolation of dendritic cells from peripheral blood and their application to the study of high affinity IgE receptor (FcεRI) expression by dendritic cells in health and atopic asthma (1999)
- Doctoral advisor: Stephen Holgate

Judith Holloway is an immunologist based at the University of Southampton. She is Professorial Fellow of Allergy in the University of Southampton's Faculty of Medicine. She is programme director of Southampton's MSc Allergy course. Holloway is a Principal Fellow of the Higher Education Academy.

== Education ==
Professor Judith Holloway studied undergraduate biology at the University of Southampton. Holloway then went on to undertake a doctorate with Professor Stephen Holgate at the University of Southampton, which she completed in 1999.

== Career ==
Holloway began her career as a postdoctoral researcher with Professor John Warner, researching how the human immune system develops during pregnancy and in young babies. She has remained at the University of Southampton since then, working in numerous research roles. She became programme lead of the MSc Allergy course in 2007. The MSc Allergy course has support from the Natasha Allergy Research Foundation. The foundation was founded after the death of Natasha Ednan-Laperouse, which also resulted in Natasha's Law being introduced in the UK.

Holloway was awarded a National Teaching Fellowship in 2017. She was also the chair of the British Society for Allergy & Clinical Immunology (BSACI) Allergy Education Network in 2021. She also appeared on a podcast episode with popular geneticist Adam Rutherford and mathematician Hannah Fry to talk about the science behind allergies.

=== Selected publications ===
- Holloway JA, Holgate ST, Semper AE. "Expression of the high-affinity IgE receptor on peripheral blood dendritic cells: differential binding of IgE in atopic asthma". J Allergy Clin Immunol. 2001 Jun;107(6):1009-18. doi: 10.1067/mai.2001.115039. PMID 11398078.
- Holloway JA, Warner JO, Vance GH, Diaper ND, Warner JA, Jones CA. "Detection of house-dust-mite allergen in amniotic fluid and umbilical-cord blood". Lancet. 2000 Dec 2;356(9245):1900-2. doi: 10.1016/S0140-6736(00)03265-7. PMID 11130390.
- Jones CA, Holloway JA, Popplewell EJ, Diaper ND, Holloway JW, Vance GH, Warner JA, Warner JO. "Reduced soluble CD14 levels in amniotic fluid and breast milk are associated with the subsequent development of atopy, eczema, or both". J Allergy Clin Immunol. 2002 May;109(5):858-66. doi: 10.1067/mai.2002.123535. PMID 11994712.
- Holmes D, Pettigrew D, Reccius CH, Gwyer JD, van Berkel C, Holloway J, Davies DE, Morgan H. "Leukocyte analysis and differentiation using high speed microfluidic single cell impedance cytometry". Lab Chip. 2009 Oct 21;9(20):2881-9. doi: 10.1039/b910053a. Epub 2009 Aug 7. PMID 19789739.

== Personal life ==
Professor Holloway is married to John Holloway, and has collaborated on several projects and papers with him.
