= Stephen Holgate =

Stephen Holgate may refer to:

- Stephen Holgate (rugby league)
- Stephen Holgate (physician)
