= Hollway =

Hollway is a surname and a given name. Notable people with the name include:

Surname:

- Bob Hollway (1926–1999), American football player and coach
- John Hollway (1841–1907), English metallurgist and chemist
- Mike Hollway, American college football coach
- Sandy Hollway, senior Australian public servant and policymaker
- Thomas Hollway (1906–1971), the 36th Premier of Victoria, Australia
- Wendy Hollway (born 1949), British psychologist

Given name:

- Shadworth Hollway Hodgson, FBA (1832–1912), English philosopher

== See also ==
- Holloway (disambiguation)
