= Charles Holloway =

Charles Holloway may refer to:

- Charles Holloway (cricketer) (1789–1846), English professional cricketer
- Sir Charles Holloway (British Army officer) (1749–1827), major-general in the Royal Engineers
- Charles Holloway (stage) (1848–1908), Australian actor and manager
- Charles A. Holloway, American professor and business executive
- Charles Nelson Holloway (1872–1938), British architect based in Nottingham
- Charles E. Holloway (died 1962), namesake for Camp Holloway

== See also ==
- Charles Holloway James (1893–1953), British architect
