= Great Britain at the 1904 Summer Olympics =

- Flag of the United Kingdom
- IOC code: GBR
- NOC: British Olympic Association

in St. Louis
- Competitors: 3 in 1 sport
- Medals Ranked 6th: Gold 1 Silver 1 Bronze 0 Total 2

Summer Olympics appearances (overview)
- 1896; 1900; 1904; 1908; 1912; 1920; 1924; 1928; 1932; 1936; 1948; 1952; 1956; 1960; 1964; 1968; 1972; 1976; 1980; 1984; 1988; 1992; 1996; 2000; 2004; 2008; 2012; 2016; 2020; 2024

Other related appearances
- 1906 Intercalated Games

Great Britain boycotted the 1904 Summer Olympics in St. Louis, Missouri, United States. Numerous events were contested, of which only some were later recognised by the IOC as official Olympic events. Within these, three athletes representing Ireland participated, winning one gold and one silver medal; since Ireland was part of the United Kingdom at the time, the IOC accordingly classifies these athletes as British.

With this classification, it should be mentioned that Tom Kiely, who won gold in the all-around athletics event, refused offers of a free trip and reimbursement of travel expenses from British and American officials, paid his own way, and was insistent that he represented Ireland. The disputed nationality of Kiely has historic importance in British Olympicism because it is his gold medal that allows Great Britain to claim to be the only nation to have won at least one gold at every Summer Games.

John Holloway had emigrated from Bansha to the U.S. some years previously and, like Kiely, wore a green singlet with a shamrock while competing. Holloway is counted as British by some statistics, whereas the Irish Whales (who represented U.S. clubs) are counted as American.

== Medallists ==
Medal	Name	Sport	Event	Date
Gold	Tom Kiely	Athletics	Men's all-around	July 4
Silver	John Daly	Athletics	Men's 2590 m steeplechase	August 29

== Results by event ==
=== Athletics ===
Event	Place	Athlete	Final
Men's 2590 metre steeplechase	2nd	John Daly	7:40.6

Event	Place	Athlete	Total score
Men's all-around	1st	Tom Kiely	6036
Men's all-around	4th	John Holloway	5273
