= Ted Cohen (Florida politician) =

American politician

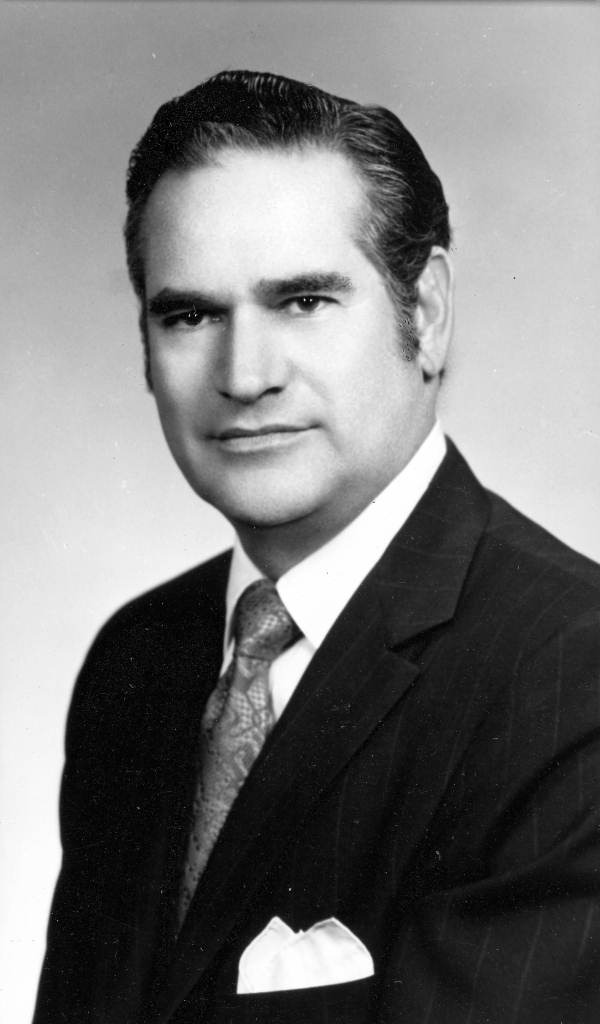

Member of the Florida House of Representatives from the 102nd district
- In office November 7, 1972 – November 5, 1974
- Preceded by: Vernon Holloway
- Succeeded by: Gwen Margolis

Personal details
- Born: August 13, 1922 New York City, U.S.
- Died: October 17, 2002 (aged 80) Florida, U.S.
- Party: Democratic
- Spouse: (divorced)
- Children: One son and two daughters, as well as three grandchildren
- Education: United States Naval Academy
- Occupation: insurance executive, public relations executive, publishing executive

Ted Ellis Cohen (August 13, 1922 – October 17, 2002) was a politician in the American state of Florida. He served in the Florida House of Representatives from 1972 to 1974, representing the 102nd district.
