= Margaret Brenda Holloway =

New Zealand watercolour artist

- Born: Margaret Brenda North; 1882
- Died: 1944 (aged 61–62); Timaru, New Zealand
- Style: Watercolour
- Spouse: John Ernest Holloway
- Children: Jack Holloway

Margaret Brenda Holloway (née North) (1882–1944) was a New Zealand artist who primarily painted watercolours landscapes of the Southland Region, of New Zealand. She was wife to John Ernest Holloway and mother to Jack Holloway.

== Biography ==
Margaret Brenda North was born in 1882. In 1908, she married John Ernest Holloway, the botanist and Anglican priest. They had at least one daughter and a son, Jack Holloway.

She produced water colours, largely of Southland. She won first and second place for landscape watercolours at the Oxford Show, Christchurch in 1915. She exhibited at the Otago Art Society frequently from 1929 to 1941. The following works were recorded with positive reviews in newspaper reports at the time:

- 1929: "Early Morning, Wakatipu" and "The Road Through the Beech Forest"
- 1930: "Evening, Diamond Lake"
- 1932: "ln a Shropshire Village"
- 1933: "Unsettled Weather, Diamond Lake" and "The Routeburn Flat"
- 1934: "Ben Lomond from Walter Peaks"
- 1936: Four artworks including "Rata, South Otago Coast," "Young Gum Tree" and "Early Morning, Lake Te Anau"
- 1937: "A Roslyn Landmark" and "Above Purakanui"
- 1938: "A Study of Mount Lily Leaves"
- 1941: "Showery Weather, Westland" and "A Bush Road, South Westland"

Several of her art works are held by the Turnbull and Hocken Libraries.

She died on 21 May 1944 in Timaru.
