= Holloway =

A hollow way is a sunken lane. Holloway may refer to:

== People ==
- Holloway (surname)
- Holloway Halstead Frost (1889–1935), American World War I Navy officer

== Place names ==
United Kingdom

- Holloway, London, inner-city district in the London Borough of Islington
  - Holloway Road, a road that bisects the district
  - HM Prison Holloway, originally a mixed population prison, but later a female-only prison. Closed in 2016
  - Holloway (ward), an electoral division of the London Borough of Islington
  - Lower Holloway, place in the London Borough of Islington
  - Upper Holloway, place in the London Borough of Islington
- Holloway, Berkshire, a location
- Holloway, Derbyshire, village in Derbyshire close to Crich
- Holloway, Wiltshire

United States

- Holloway, Michigan, an unincorporated community
- Holloway, Minnesota, in Swift County
- Holloway, Ohio, in Belmont County

== Other uses ==
- Holloway Press, New Zealand fine press publisher
- The Holloways, London-based indie rock band
- Holloway Field, baseball field in Brisbane, Australia
- Royal Holloway, University of London, one of the constituent colleges of the University of London
- Holloway Brothers (London), British building company specialising in restoration work
- 10 Holloway Circus, skyscraper in Birmingham, England

== See also ==
- Halloway
- Hollowaya, a genus of tiger moth
