= Norfolk and Norwich Festival =

Arts festival held annually in Norwich, England

Norfolk & Norwich Festival is an arts festival held annually in Norwich, England.

It is one of the oldest city festivals in England, having been held since 1824 and tracing its roots back further to 1772. It was initially conceived as a fundraiser for the Norfolk & Norwich Hospital. For most of its history, it was a purely classical musical festival which saw performances by many famous artistes, composers and conductors. In recent years the festival has moved away from this focus, and has diversified to include a variety of circus, performance, contemporary music, dance, visual arts and children's events.

Since the early 2010s, the Festival has continued to expand in scale and scope, and is now widely described as the fourth-largest arts festival in the United Kingdom, drawing an estimated 80,000 attendees over 17 days each May. It became a registered charity in 2016 and has operated as an Arts Council England National Portfolio Organisation since 2012. Alongside its May festival, the organisation runs a year-round programme of arts education and community engagement work called Festival Connect & Create. This work focuses on children, young people, and communities with limited existing access to the arts.

== Origins ==
The festival was established as a triennial event in 1824 to support the ongoing construction of the Norfolk & Norwich Hospital, and grew out of earlier musical fundraisers for the hospital dating back as far as 1772 including the annual performance of an oratorio at Norwich Cathedral.

In its early days, the festival was mainly held in St. Andrew's Hall and St Peter Mancroft. These events consisted primarily of oratorios and other large scale choral works performed by the Norwich Festival Chorus, then 300 strong. Noted premieres from this time included The Last Judgement by the German Romantic composer and conductor Louis Spohr.

== 20th century ==
The triennial festival continued to develop a reputation throughout the Victorian and Edwardian period, but was suspended during the First World War, being revived under the patronage of Norwich's first female Lord Mayor, Ethel Colman in 1923.

It saw the premieres of significant classical works including Edward Elgar's Sea Pictures in 1899 (sung by Clara Butt), E. J. Moeran's Rhapsody No. 2 for the 1924 centenary concert (based on a Norfolk folksong), Frank Bridge's Enter Spring in 1927, Ralph Vaughan Williams's Job: A Masque for Dancing in 1930, Arthur Bliss's Morning Heroes also in 1930 and Benjamin Britten's Our Hunting Fathers in 1936.

An oft-recounted story from the 1936 festival is of Vaughan Williams's intervention to stop the orchestra mocking the 22-year-old Britten's work. Vaughan Williams told them they were "in the presence of greatness" (referring to the young composer) and that if they did not want to play Britten's work they would not play his (Vaughan Williams was premiering his own Five Tudor Portraits at the same festival).

As a musical festival, it also attracted prestigious musical directors including Sir Henry Wood, Sir Thomas Beecham, Sir Malcolm Sargent, Norman Del Mar and Vernon Handley.

The festival became an annual event in 1989 following an agreement with directors of Festival Norwich (FN). FN was started in 1986 as the first annual festival of arts and music in Norfolk devoted to organising a wide range of activities embracing art, music and industry in Norfolk. The directors of the Triennial were approached with the proposal that FN would run for two consecutive years, with the Triennial continuing every third year. However, the Triennial decided that it should be an annual event itself, and it was agreed that in this case FN would cease functioning after only three years. Under the direction of Marcus Davey, now director of The Roundhouse in London, the scope of the festival was changed from classical music to cater for a larger variety of music, theatre, dance and other visual arts. As part of the widening of the Festival's scope, a new art initiative called "Norfolk and Norwich Festival Visual Arts Week" was begun in 1994, which evolved into Norfolk & Norwich Open Studios, an open gallery event.

== 21st century ==
In 2001, the Festival took the significant step of moving from October to May. Under Jonathan Holloway's direction (2004–2010), the Festival's programme broadened significantly beyond its classical roots, with audiences increasing by around 1,000% and turnover more than quadrupling over the period. The Festival took over delivery of "Creative Partnerships in Norfolk" during this time, part of the UK's flagship creativity-in-schools programme. Programming highlights included appearances by composers and musicians such as Philip Glass, Michael Nyman and Laurie Anderson, alongside dance, circus and theatre companies including the Michael Clark Company, Nofit State Circus and Forced Entertainment.

William Galinsky succeeded Holloway as Artistic Director in 2011, continuing the Festival's multi-artform direction with programming that included Artichoke's Dining with Alice, the Kronos Quartet, and fado singer Mariza.

Daniel Brine became Artistic Director and Chief Executive in 2018. Under his direction the Festival has continued to expand its scale and community reach. There was a hiatus in 2020 due to the COVID-19 pandemic and a resumption from 2021 onward. Large-scale outdoor works have been a recurring feature of this period, including Dominoes by Station House Opera, in which a line of around 7,000 breeze-block-style dominoes was toppled through Norwich city centre to launch the Festival's 250th-anniversary edition in 2022, and Mo and the Red Ribbon by French company L'Homme Debout, a 25-foot puppet parade exploring the experience of migration from a child's perspective, which opened the 2024 Festival. The 2026 Festival ran from 8 to 24 May, presenting more than 100 performances across venues in and around Norwich, with headline acts including circus company Circa and jazz act GoGo Penguin, part of a collaboration with Norwich Jazz Festival.

== Arts education and community programmes ==
From 2012/13, the Festival received a total of £1.35 million annually from Arts Council England to enable it to become a bridge organisation for developing arts opportunities for children and young people, acting as a bridge between the arts and education sectors.

Since 2023, the Festival's year-round schools and community engagement work has been developed under the name Festival Connect & Create, which brings creative opportunities to schools and communities identified as having the least existing cultural provision. Projects delivered under this programme have included Sea Like a Mirror, a partnership commission marking the 200th anniversary of the Royal National Lifeboat Institution, created with coastal communities around Cromer, and Spaces and Places, residencies placing artists in schools across the region, including in areas identified as having lower levels of cultural provision. An annual bursary scheme is available for local artists and young creatives to develop and deliver projects around the region to enrich the creative journeys of young people.

== Directors ==
- Sir Henry Wood (1908–1930)
- Sir Thomas Beecham (1936 –
- Norman Del Mar
- Vernon Handley
- Richard Philips (1988-1991)
- Heather Newell
- Marcus Davey (1995-1999)
- Jonathan Holloway (2004–2010)
- William Galinsky (2011 – 2017)
- Daniel Brine (2017-present)
