= Tom Kiely =

Irish athlete

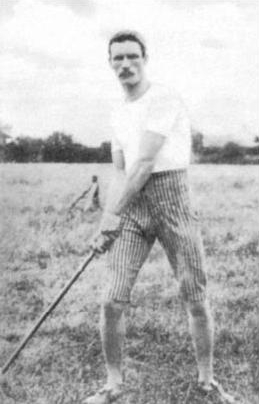

Personal information
- Born: 25 August 1869 Ballyneale, Tipperary, Ireland
- Died: 6 November 1951 (aged 82) Carrick-on-Suir, Tipperary, Ireland

Sport
- Sport: Athletics
- Club: Suirside AC
Medal record
Representing Great Britain
Olympic Games
Gold medal – first place	1904 St Louis	All-around

Thomas Francis Kiely (25 August 1869 – 6 November 1951) was an Irish athlete. Kiely won gold in the all-round at the 1904 Summer Olympics in St. Louis, Missouri representing Great Britain and Ireland, making him the first multi-event track and field champion of the Modern Olympic Games

== Biography ==
Kiely was born in Ballyneale, Co. Tipperary, Ireland. the son of William and Mary (nee Downey) Kiely. He attended Ballyneale National School, where he started to take part in Gaelic football, hurling, and athletics. He represented Tipperary at Hurling, playing for Munster when they beat Leinster in London. In addition, he was the captain of the Grangemockler Gaelic Football Team, and on the same day as he represented Munster in the hurling match against Leinster, he played Gaelic football for Ireland versus London-Irish at Stamford Bridge.

In all, Kiely won 53 sporting titles, and these were 38 Gaelic Athletic Association titles and Irish Amateur Athletic Association titles. He also won two American all round championships and won five British hammer throw titles at the AAA Championships in 1897, 1898, 1899, 1901 and 1902.

Away from the sports field, Kiely played the fiddle and the flute and was an accomplished Irish dancer.

Kiely competed in the 1904 Summer Olympics held in St. Louis, Missouri, in the all-round, which consisted of 100 yd run, shot put, high jump, 880 yd walk, hammer throw, pole vault, 120 yd hurdles, 56 pounds weight throw, long jump and 1 mile run. All ten events were held on the same day. He won the gold medal, becoming the first multi-event track and field champion in the Modern Olympic Games.

Kiely was thirty-four at this time. The British team had approached him with promises of his fare and expenses, and American sponsorship was also offered, but as a committed nationalist, he decided to go on his own, representing his native country, Ireland. He raised the fare partly by selling many of the prizes he had won over the years and sailed to the US at the end of May.

In America, he had several more offers to join the American or British teams. But again, he declined and made it clear in all statements to the press that he would represent only Ireland in the Olympic Games. As Ireland was not independent in 1904, the International Olympic Committee lists him as representative of the team of Great Britain and Ireland at the 1904 Summer Olympics.

He died on 6 November 1951 at his home in Carrick-on-Suir, and he was buried in the cemetery at Ballyneale. He is commemorated by a memorial at Ballyneale Church, which was unveiled in 1970. In 2016 his gold medal was displayed at the Gaelic Athletic Association's Museum as part of the Irish Olympians exhibition.
