= Henry Holloway =

Henry Holloway may refer to:

- Henry Holloway (rugby league) (1931–1999), Australian rugby league player and coach
- Henry Holloway (pirate) (fl. 1687), pirate active off the American east coast
- Henry Holloway (cricketer) (1812–1850), English cricketer and clergyman
- Henry Thomas Holloway (1853–1914) and Sir Henry Holloway (1857–1923), founders of Holloway Brothers (London), an English construction company
