= Jonathan Holloway =

Jonathan Holloway may refer to:

- Jonathan Holloway (artistic director) (born 1970), British artistic director
- Jonathan Holloway (historian) (born 1967), American historian and President of Rutgers University
- Jonathan Holloway (playwright) (born 1955), English playwright and theatre director

== See also ==
- John Holloway (disambiguation)
