= Adam Gunn =

American decathlete

Medal record

Men's athletics

Representing the United States

Olympic Games
Silver medal – second place	1904 St Louis	All-around

Adam Beattie Gunn (December 23, 1870 – August 17, 1935) was a Scottish-American athlete who competed mainly in the "All rounder", the forerunner of today's Decathlon. Gunn took first place in the Amateur Athletic Union's U.S. All-around championships in 1901 and 1902. The 1901 title was won in Buffalo, New York which Gunn adopted as his home town.

He competed for the United States in the 1904 Summer Olympics held in St. Louis, Missouri in the All rounder which consisted of 100 y run, shot put, high jump, 880 y walk, hammer throw, pole vault, 120 y hurdles, 56 pounds weight throw, long jump and 1 mile run, where he won the silver medal.

He was born in the Sutherland village of Golspie, in the Highlands of Scotland.
