= Halloway =

Halloway/Halaway are surnames. Notable people include:

- Anis Halloway, Sierra Leonian singer-songwriter
- Arthur Halloway (1885–1961), pioneering Australian rugby league footballer and coach
- Bill Halloway (born 1912), a rugby league footballer in the New South Wales Rugby League
- Erica Halloway (born 1984), Australian association football player
- Ransom Halloway (c.1793–1851), United States Representative from New York
- William "Will" Halloway and Charles Halloway, characters from the novel Something Wicked This Way Comes

== See also ==
- Halloway (EP) by Tessa Violet, 2016
- Holloway (disambiguation)
