= Henry Holloway (cricketer) =

English cricketer

Personal information
- Full name: Henry Holloway
- Born: 6 November 1812; Charlbury, Oxfordshire, England
- Died: 1 July 1850 (aged 37); Towcester, Northamptonshire, England
- Batting: Unknown

Domestic team information
- Years: Team
- 1836: Oxford University

Career statistics
Competition	First-class
Matches	1
Runs scored	6
Batting average	3.00
100s/50s	–/–
Top score	5
Catches/stumpings	–/–
- Source: Cricinfo, 11 April 2020

Henry Holloway (16 November 1812 – 1 July 1850) was an English first-class cricketer and clergyman.

The son of Benjamin Holloway, he was born in November 1912 at Charlbury, Oxfordshire. He was educated at Winchester College, before going up to New College, Oxford. While studying at Oxford, he made a single appearance in first-class cricket for Oxford University against the Marylebone Cricket Club at Lord's in 1836. Batting twice in the match, he was dismissed for a single run in the Oxford first innings by John Strange, while in their second innings he was dismissed for 5 runs by the same bowler.

After graduating from Oxford, he took holy orders in the Church of England. His ecclesiastical career consisted of just one post, that of curate at Pattishall, Northamptonshire from 1840 until his death at Towcester in July 1850. He had been a fellow of New College from 1833 until his death.
