= Linda Holloway =

Scottish-New Zealand anatomical pathologist academic

Dame Linda Holloway DNZM
- Born: Linda Jane Brown; 10 June 1940 (age 86); Loanhead, Midlothian, Scotland
- Citizenship: New Zealand
- Education: University of Aberdeen
- Known for: Cartwright Inquiry, Abortion Supervisory Committee
- Spouse: John Stevenson Holloway (d. 1999)
- Children: 3
- Scientific career
- Workplaces: University of Otago
- Thesis: Histological and ultrastructural observations of capillary endothelial response to disseminated intravascular coagulation (1979)
- Relatives: Jack Holloway (father-in-law); John Holloway (son)

Dame Linda Jane Holloway DNZM (née Brown, born 10 June 1940) is a Scottish-born New Zealand anatomical pathologist academic, and was a full professor at the University of Otago.

== Early life ==
Holloway was born in Loanhead, Midlothian, Scotland, on 10 June 1940. She was raised in that country, and met her husband, New Zealand forester John Stevenson Holloway, the son of John Thorpe Holloway, while he was a student at the University of Aberdeen. She moved to New Zealand in 1970, becoming a naturalised New Zealander in 1978.

== Academic career ==
After emigrating, Holloway initially worked in provincial New Zealand, before moving to the University of Otago and Dunedin Hospital in 1975. She held numerous administrative and advisory roles, including medical advisor to the Cartwright Inquiry and being a long-serving member of the Abortion Supervisory Committee. Holloway became a full professor at Otago in 1994, and following her retirement in 2006 was conferred the title of professor emeritus.

In the 1997 Queen's Birthday Honours, Holloway was appointed an Officer of the New Zealand Order of Merit, for services to medicine. She was elevated to Distinguished Companion of the New Zealand Order of Merit in the 2005 Queen's Birthday Honours, and she accepted redesignation as a Dame Companion of the New Zealand Order of Merit following the restoration of titular honours by the New Zealand government in 2009.

== Personal life ==
Holloway's husband, John, was appointed a Member of the New Zealand Order of Merit, for services to forestry and conservation, in the 1998 Queen's Birthday Honours. He died in Dunedin on 1 January 1999. She is the mother of John Holloway.

== Selected works ==
- Linda Jane Holloway, Like leaves from a tree : common pathways to life and death, 1996
- Davis, Ben W., Richard D. Gelber, Aron Goldhirsch, William H. Hartmann, Gottfried W. Locher, Richard Reed, R. Golouh et al. "Prognostic significance of tumor grade in clinical trials of adjuvant therapy for breast cancer with axillary lymph node metastasis." Cancer 58, no. 12 (1986): 2662–2670.
- Synek, M; Beasley, R; Frew, A J; Goulding, D; Holloway, L; Lampe, F C; Roche, W R; Holgate, S T (1996). "Cellular infiltration of the airways in asthma of varying severity". American Journal of Respiratory and Critical Care Medicine. 154 (1): 224–230. doi:10.1164/ajrccm.154.1.8680684. ISSN 1073-449X. PMID 8680684.
- Bethwaite, Peter B.; Holloway, Linda J.; Thornton, Ann; Delahunt, Brett (1996). "Infiltration by immunocompetent cells in early stage invasive carcinoma of the uterine cervix: a prognostic study". Pathology. 28 (4): 321–327. doi:10.1080/00313029600169274. ISSN 0031-3025. PMID 9007950. S2CID 24761091.
- McLaren, Kathryn M.; Holloway, Linda; Pepper, Duncan S. (1980). "Human platelet factor 4 and tissue mast cells". Thrombosis Research. 19 (1–2): 293–297. doi:10.1016/0049-3848(80)90431-4. ISSN 0049-3848. PMID 6449755.
- Bethwaite, Peter; Yeong, Mee Ling; Holloway, Linda; Robson, Bridget; Duncan, Graeme; Lamb, David (1992). "The prognosis of adenosquamous carcinomas of the uterine cervix". BJOG: An International Journal of Obstetrics and Gynaecology. 99 (9): 745–750. doi:10.1111/j.1471-0528.1992.tb13877.x. ISSN 1470-0328. PMID 1420015. S2CID 72936826.
