= Séan Doran =

English artistic director

Seán Padraig Doran (born 1960) is an artistic director who was chief executive of the English National Opera from 2003 to 2005.

He was educated at St Columb's College and the University of East Anglia (BA, Music). After commencing a career as a clarinettist and conductor of a music theatre company in London, Doran was appointed to directorships of four international arts festivals, including artistic director of the UK Year of Literature 1995 (Wales), artistic director of the Belfast Festival at Queen's (1997 and 1998), and festival director of the Perth International Arts Festival (2000–2003).

In 2003, Doran was appointed artistic director of the English National Opera. He resigned in November 2005.

In 2002, Doran was awarded the Centenary Medal by the Australian Government for his directorship of the Perth Festival. In 2001, he became an Australian citizen alongside his Irish citizenship. He is married to the opera singer Ruby Philogene and lives in both London and Perth, Australia.
