= Runt (2024 film) =

2024 Australian family film

- Directed by: John Sheedy
- Written by: Craig Silvey
- Based on: Runt by Craig Silvey
- Produced by: Jamie Hilton
- Starring: Jai Courtney; Lily LaTorre; Celeste Barber; Deborah Mailman; Jack Thompson
- Cinematography: Brad Shield
- Edited by: Simon Njoo
- Music by: Iain Grandage
- Production company: See Pictures
- Distributed by: StudioCanal
- Release dates: 11 August 2024 (MIFF); 19 September 2024 (Australia)
- Running time: 91 minutes
- Country: Australia
- Language: English
- Box office: Over A$6 million (Australia)

Runt is a 2024 Australian comedy-drama family film directed by John Sheedy, starring Celeste Barber, Deborah Mailman and Jack Thompson.

== Cast ==
- Jai Courtney as Bryan Shearer
- Lily LaTorre as Annie Shearer
- Celeste Barber as Susie Shearer
- Deborah Mailman as Bernadette Box
- Jack Thompson as Earl Robert-Barren
- Genevieve Lemon as Dolly Shearer
- Joel Jackson as Constable Duncan Bayleaf
- Matt Day as Fergus Fink
- Jack Latorre as Max Shearer
- Isaiah Supadi as Dustin Brawshaw

Animal performer

- Squid as Runt, Annie's dog

== Production ==
The film, a comedy drama directed by Australian director John Sheedy, is based on Craig Silvey's 2022 novel of the same name.

The film was shot in York, Western Australia.

== Release and reception ==
Runt premiered at the Melbourne International Film Festival on 11 August 2024, and was released in Australian cinemas on 19 September 2024.

Runt was the third-highest grossing Australian film in Australia in 2024.

== See also ==
- Cinema of Australia
