= Athletics at the 1904 Summer Olympics – Men's all-around =

Men's all-around at the Games of the III Olympiad
- Venue: Francis Field
- Date: July 4, 1904
- Competitors: 7 from 2 nations

Medalists
| 1st place, gold medalist(s) | | Thomas Kiely | Great Britain |
| 2nd place, silver medalist(s) | | Adam Gunn | United States |
| 3rd place, bronze medalist(s) | | Truxtun Hare | United States |

The men's all-around championship event was held at Francis Field in St. Louis, Missouri on July 4, 1904. It was the only time the all-around, a forerunner to the later decathlon, was contested at the Olympics; whether the competition was part of the Olympic program has been disputed, but the International Olympic Committee currently recognizes it as an official Olympic event.

7 athletes from 2 nations competed. Tom Kiely, an Irishman, won with 6036 points.

== Results ==
=== 100 yard dash ===
Event 1
| Place | Athlete | Time | Score |
|---|---|---|---|
| 1. | Truxtun Hare (USA) | 10.8 | 790 |
| 2. | John Holloway (GBR) | | 769 |
| 3. | Ellery Clark (USA) | 11.0 | 748 |
| 4. | John Grieb (USA) | | 720 |
| 4. | Adam Gunn (USA) | | 720 |
| 6. | Tom Kiely (GBR) | | 713 |
| DNF | Max Emmerich (USA) | - | 0 |

=== Shot put ===
Event 2
| Place | Athlete | Distance | Score |
|---|---|---|---|
| 1. | Adam Gunn (USA) | 12.21 | 668 |
| 2. | Truxtun Hare (USA) | 12.09 | 648 |
| 3. | Tom Kiely (GBR) | 10.82 | 448 |
| 4. | John Grieb (USA) | 10.54 | 404 |
| 5. | Ellery Clark (USA) | 10.26 | 360 |
| 6. | John Holloway (GBR) | 10.01 | 320 |

After 2 events
| Place | Athlete | 1 | 2 | Total |
|---|---|---|---|---|
| 1. | Truxtun Hare (USA) | 790 | 648 | 1438 |
| 2. | Adam Gunn (USA) | 720 | 668 | 1388 |
| 3. | Tom Kiely (GBR) | 713 | 448 | 1161 |
| 4. | John Grieb (USA) | 720 | 404 | 1124 |
| 5. | Ellery Clark (USA) | 748 | 360 | 1108 |
| 6. | John Holloway (GBR) | 769 | 320 | 1089 |
| DNF | Max Emmerich (USA) | 0 | - | - |

=== High jump ===
Event 3
| Place | Athlete | Height | Score |
|---|---|---|---|
| 1. | John Holloway (GBR) | 1.68 | 672 |
| 2. | Adam Gunn (USA) | 1.65 | 640 |
| 3. | Ellery Clark (USA) | 1.62 | 608 |
| 3. | John Grieb (USA) | 1.62 | 608 |
| 5. | Truxtun Hare (USA) | 1.52 | 480 |
| 5. | Tom Kiely (GBR) | 1.52 | 480 |

After 3 events
| Place | Athlete | 1 | 2 | 3 | Total |
|---|---|---|---|---|---|
| 1. | Adam Gunn (USA) | 720 | 668 | 640 | 2028 |
| 2. | Truxtun Hare (USA) | 790 | 648 | 480 | 1918 |
| 3. | John Holloway (GBR) | 769 | 320 | 672 | 1761 |
| 4. | John Grieb (USA) | 720 | 404 | 608 | 1732 |
| 5. | Ellery Clark (USA) | 748 | 360 | 608 | 1716 |
| 6. | Tom Kiely (GBR) | 713 | 448 | 480 | 1641 |
| DNF | Max Emmerich (USA) | 0 | - | - | - |

=== 880 yard walk ===
Event 4
| Place | Athlete | Time | Score |
|---|---|---|---|
| 1. | Tom Kiely (GBR) | 3:59 | 717 |
| 1. | John Holloway (GBR) | 3:59 | 717 |
| 3. | Ellery Clark (USA) | 4:11 | 657 |
| 4. | Adam Gunn (USA) | 4:13 | 647 |
| 5. | Truxtun Hare (USA) | 4:20 | 612 |
| 6. | John Grieb (USA) | 4:49 | 467 |

After 4 events
| Place | Athlete | 1 | 2 | 3 | 4 | Total |
|---|---|---|---|---|---|---|
| 1. | Adam Gunn (USA) | 720 | 668 | 640 | 647 | 2675 |
| 2. | Truxtun Hare (USA) | 790 | 648 | 480 | 612 | 2530 |
| 3. | John Holloway (GBR) | 769 | 320 | 672 | 717 | 2478 |
| 4. | Ellery Clark (USA) | 748 | 360 | 608 | 657 | 2373 |
| 5. | Tom Kiely (GBR) | 713 | 448 | 480 | 717 | 2358 |
| 6. | John Grieb (USA) | 720 | 404 | 608 | 467 | 2199 |
| DNF | Max Emmerich (USA) | 0 | - | - | - | |

=== Hammer throw ===
Event 5
| Place | Athlete | Distance | Score |
|---|---|---|---|
| 1. | Tom Kiely (GBR) | 36.76 | 706 |
| 2. | Truxtun Hare (USA) | 36.28 | 687 |
| 3. | Adam Gunn (USA) | 31.40 | 495 |
| 4. | Ellery Clark (USA) | 29.11 | 405 |
| 5. | John Holloway (GBR) | 27.51 | 342 |
| DNS | John Grieb (USA) | — | 0 |

After 5 events
| Place | Athlete | 1 | 2 | 3 | 4 | 5 | Total |
|---|---|---|---|---|---|---|---|
| 1. | Truxtun Hare (USA) | 790 | 648 | 480 | 612 | 687 | 3217 |
| 2. | Adam Gunn (USA) | 720 | 668 | 640 | 647 | 495 | 3170 |
| 3. | Tom Kiely (GBR) | 713 | 448 | 480 | 717 | 706 | 3064 |
| 4. | John Holloway (GBR) | 769 | 320 | 672 | 717 | 342 | 2820 |
| 5. | Ellery Clark (USA) | 748 | 360 | 608 | 657 | 405 | 2778 |
| DNF | John Grieb (USA) | 720 | 404 | 608 | 467 | 0 | 2199 |
| DNF | Max Emmerich (USA) | 0 | - | - | - | - | |

=== Pole vault ===
Event 6
| Place | Athlete | Height | Score |
|---|---|---|---|
| 1. | Adam Gunn (USA) | 2.97 | 616 |
| 2. | John Holloway (GBR) | 2.89 | 568 |
| 3. | Tom Kiely (GBR) | 2.74 | 472 |
| 4. | Truxtun Hare (USA) | 2.44 | 280 |
| DNS | Ellery Clark (USA) | — | 0 |

After 6 events
| Place | Athlete | 1 | 2 | 3 | 4 | 5 | 6 | Total |
|---|---|---|---|---|---|---|---|---|
| 1. | Adam Gunn (USA) | 720 | 668 | 640 | 647 | 495 | 616 | 3786 |
| 2. | Tom Kiely (GBR) | 713 | 448 | 480 | 717 | 706 | 472 | 3536 |
| 3. | Truxtun Hare (USA) | 790 | 648 | 480 | 612 | 687 | 280 | 3497 |
| 4. | John Holloway (GBR) | 769 | 320 | 672 | 717 | 342 | 568 | 3388 |
| DNF | Ellery Clark (USA) | 748 | 360 | 608 | 657 | 405 | 0 | 2778 |
| DNF | John Grieb (USA) | 720 | 404 | 608 | 467 | 0 | - | 2199 |
| DNF | Max Emmerich (USA) | 0 | - | - | - | - | - | |

=== 120 yard hurdles ===
Event 7
| Place | Athlete | Time | Score |
|---|---|---|---|
| 1. | Tom Kiely (GBR) | 17.8 | 670 |
| 2. | Adam Gunn (USA) | | 655 |
| 3. | Truxtun Hare (USA) | | 600 |
| 4. | John Holloway (GBR) | | 590 |

After 7 events
| Place | Athlete | 1 | 2 | 3 | 4 | 5 | 6 | 7 | Total |
|---|---|---|---|---|---|---|---|---|---|
| 1. | Adam Gunn (USA) | 720 | 668 | 640 | 647 | 495 | 616 | 655 | 4441 |
| 2. | Tom Kiely (GBR) | 713 | 448 | 480 | 717 | 706 | 472 | 670 | 4206 |
| 3. | Truxtun Hare (USA) | 790 | 648 | 480 | 612 | 687 | 280 | 600 | 4097 |
| 4. | John Holloway (GBR) | 769 | 320 | 672 | 717 | 342 | 568 | 590 | 3978 |
| DNF | Ellery Clark (USA) | 748 | 360 | 608 | 657 | 405 | 0 | - | |
| DNF | John Grieb (USA) | 720 | 404 | 608 | 467 | 0 | - | - | |
| DNF | Max Emmerich (USA) | 0 | - | - | - | - | - | - | |

=== 56 pound weight throw ===
Event 8
| Place | Athlete | Distance | Score |
|---|---|---|---|
| 1. | Tom Kiely (GBR) | 8.91 | 684 |
| 2. | Truxtun Hare (USA) | 7.59 | 475 |
| 3. | Adam Gunn (USA) | 7.22 | 418 |
| 4. | John Holloway (GBR) | 5.98 | 222 |

After 8 events
| Place | Athlete | 1 | 2 | 3 | 4 | 5 | 6 | 7 | 8 | Total |
|---|---|---|---|---|---|---|---|---|---|---|
| 1. | Tom Kiely (GBR) | 713 | 448 | 480 | 717 | 706 | 472 | 670 | 684 | 4890 |
| 2. | Adam Gunn (USA) | 720 | 668 | 640 | 647 | 495 | 616 | 655 | 418 | 4859 |
| 3. | Truxtun Hare (USA) | 790 | 648 | 480 | 612 | 687 | 280 | 600 | 475 | 4572 |
| 4. | John Holloway (GBR) | 769 | 320 | 672 | 717 | 342 | 568 | 590 | 222 | 4200 |
| DNF | Ellery Clark (USA) | 748 | 360 | 608 | 657 | 405 | 0 | - | - | |
| DNF | John Grieb (USA) | 720 | 404 | 608 | 467 | 0 | - | - | - | |
| DNF | Max Emmerich (USA) | 0 | - | - | - | - | - | - | - | |

=== Long jump ===
Event 9
| Place | Athlete | Distance | Score |
|---|---|---|---|
| 1. | Truxtun Hare (USA) | 6.07 | 652 |
| 2. | Tom Kiely (GBR) | 5.94 | 612 |
| 3. | Adam Gunn (USA) | 5.53 | 484 |
| 3. | John Holloway (GBR) | 5.53 | 484 |

After 9 events
| Place | Athlete | 1 | 2 | 3 | 4 | 5 | 6 | 7 | 8 | 9 | Total |
|---|---|---|---|---|---|---|---|---|---|---|---|
| 1. | Tom Kiely (GBR) | 713 | 448 | 480 | 717 | 706 | 472 | 670 | 684 | 612 | 5502 |
| 2. | Adam Gunn (USA) | 720 | 668 | 640 | 647 | 495 | 616 | 655 | 418 | 484 | 5343 |
| 3. | Truxtun Hare (USA) | 790 | 648 | 480 | 612 | 687 | 280 | 600 | 475 | 652 | 5224 |
| 4. | John Holloway (GBR) | 769 | 320 | 672 | 717 | 342 | 568 | 590 | 222 | 484 | 4684 |
| DNF | Ellery Clark (USA) | 748 | 360 | 608 | 657 | 405 | 0 | - | - | - | |
| DNF | John Grieb (USA) | 720 | 404 | 608 | 467 | 0 | - | - | - | - | |
| DNF | Max Emmerich (USA) | 0 | - | - | - | - | - | - | - | - | |

=== 1 mile run ===
Event 10
| Place | Athlete | Time | Score |
|---|---|---|---|
| 1. | Truxtun Hare (USA) | 5:40.0 | 589 |
| 2. | John Holloway (GBR) | 5:40.0 | 589 |
| 3. | Adam Gunn (USA) | 5:45.0 | 564 |
| 4. | Tom Kiely (GBR) | 5:51.0 | 534 |

Final standings
| Place | Athlete | 1 | 2 | 3 | 4 | 5 | 6 | 7 | 8 | 9 | 10 | Total |
|---|---|---|---|---|---|---|---|---|---|---|---|---|
| 1. | Tom Kiely (GBR) | 713 | 448 | 480 | 717 | 706 | 472 | 670 | 684 | 612 | 534 | 6036 |
| 2. | Adam Gunn (USA) | 720 | 668 | 640 | 647 | 495 | 616 | 655 | 418 | 484 | 564 | 5907 |
| 3. | Truxtun Hare (USA) | 790 | 648 | 480 | 612 | 687 | 280 | 600 | 475 | 652 | 589 | 5813 |
| 4. | John Holloway (GBR) | 769 | 320 | 672 | 717 | 342 | 568 | 590 | 222 | 484 | 589 | 5273 |
| DNF | Ellery Clark (USA) | 748 | 360 | 608 | 657 | 405 | 0 | - | - | - | - | |
| DNF | John Grieb (USA) | 720 | 404 | 608 | 467 | 0 | - | - | - | - | - | |
| DNF | Max Emmerich (USA) | 0 | - | - | - | - | - | - | - | - | - | |

== Sources ==
- Wudarski, Pawel (1999). "Wyniki Igrzysk Olimpijskich" (in Polish).
