= Synairgen =

Synairgen PLC
- Traded as: AIM: SNG
- Industry: Drug discovery Biotechnology
- Founded: 2003
- Founder: Stephen Holgate; Donna E. Davies; Ratko Djukanovic
- Headquarters: Southampton, United Kingdom
- Key people: Richard Marsden (CEO); John Ward (CFO); Phillip Monk (CSO)
- Website: synairgen.com

Synairgen is a University spin-off and public limited company (plc) working in drug discovery and biotechnology. It was founded in 2003 by University of Southampton professors Stephen Holgate, Donna E. Davies and Ratko Djukanovic. The company is developing an inhaled formulation of interferon-beta for severe viral respiratory diseases including COVID-19.

Richard Marsden was appointed chief executive officer in September 2009.

== Business activities ==
Synairgen has developed and is testing an inhaled formulation of interferon beta, a naturally occurring protein which orchestrates the body's antiviral responses. Viruses, including coronaviruses, have evolved mechanisms which suppress natural IFN-β production, thereby helping the virus evade the immune system.

Richard Marsden, the company's chief executive, said one of the main ways viruses evaded the immune system was “to suppress the production of interferon beta”, which plays a significant role in activating the wider immune response and preventing a virus from replicating. “All we’re doing is putting . . . this protein, that everyone makes, back into the battleground, and the battleground that matters is in the lungs,” Marsden said.

== COVID-19 drug trials ==
In March 2020, Synairgen initiated a placebo-controlled Phase 2 trial of SNG001, an inhaled form of interferon beta, in COVID-19 patients in the UK.

In July 2020, Synairgen announced SNG001 lowered the risk of severe COVID-19 in infected patients in a small clinical trial. The details of the study were published in Lancet in November 2020.

The Phase 3 SPRINTER trial (SG018), a randomised, double-blind, placebo-controlled study evaluating SNG001 for the treatment of hospitalised COVID-19 patients, was initiated in January 2021. It completed enrolment of 610 patients in November 2021 across 17 countries.

SNG001 is also being investigated independently as part of the US National Institute of Health's ACTIV-2 (Accelerating COVID-19 Therapeutic Interventions and Vaccines) programme to accelerate the development of the most promising COVID-19 treatments.

The ACTIV-2 study, sponsored by the National Institute of Allergy and Infectious Diseases (NIAID), part of the National Institutes of Health, and led by the NIAID-funded AIDS Clinical Trials Group (ACTG), is testing agents in outpatient adults with documented positive SARS-CoV-2 infection and symptoms of COVID-19. Synairgen's SNG001 was advanced into Phase 3 in October 2021.
