= Lindy Hume =

Australian opera and festival director (born 1961)

Lindy Hume AM
- Born: 25 August 1961 (age 65); Paddington, New South Wales, Australia
- Occupation: Opera director • festival director

Lindy Hume AM (born 25 August 1961) is an Australian opera and festival director, who has worked throughout Australia and internationally.

== Early life ==
Hume was born in the Sydney suburb of Paddington and grew up in Glebe and Annandale. Her father taught primary school and also worked as a film censor. Her mother was a psychologist at the University of Sydney.

== Career ==
Hume was Artistic Director of West Australian Opera (1992–1996), OzOpera and Victorian State Opera (1996–2001), and Director of the Perth International Arts Festival (2004–2007).

She was appointed as Director of the Sydney Festival in 2008, and led it from 2010 to 2012.

As of June 2017 she is Artistic Director of Opera Queensland. Her productions for Opera Queensland included a 2014 season of Verdi's Rigoletto inspired by Italian Prime Minister Silvio Berlusconi. She fosters the creation and presentation of performance in regional Australia, and performances in eight regional Queensland centres of Puccini's La bohème in 2014 featured local singers in the chorus.

Her freelance productions also included a season of Gluck's Iphigénie en Tauride for Sydney's Pinchgut Opera, described by Hannah Cunningham of The Sydney Morning Herald as "a near perfect production".

== Awards ==
Hume received Helpmann Awards and Green Room Awards in 2002 for Best Director for the world premiere of Richard Mills' Batavia. Her 2010 Sydney Festival won five Helpmann Awards including Best New Australian Work for Smoke & Mirrors, Best Major Event (Festival First Night), and Best Classical or Orchestral Concert (Oedipus Rex/Symphony of Psalms).

She was the recipient of an Honorary Doctorate of Letters from the University of Western Australia in 2007. Hume was awarded Member of the Order of Australia (AM) in the 2021 Australia Day Honours, for "For significant service to the performing arts, particularly to opera."

== Selected productions ==
=== Australia/New Zealand ===
- Carmen, Don Giovanni, Fledermaus, La Périchole, Les pêcheurs de perles (Opera Australia)
- Cinderella, Rigoletto (Opera Queensland)
- The Love of the Nightingale (Perth International Arts Festival)
- Orlando, Trouble in Tahiti, The Barber of Seville (OzOpera)
- Alcina, Orpheus in the Underworld (West Australian Opera)
- Carmina Burana (State Opera of South Australia/The Australian Ballet)
- Idomeneo, Iphigénie en Tauride (Pinchgut Opera)
- Rigoletto, Lucia di Lammermoor (New Zealand Opera).

=== International ===
- La bohème (Deutsche Staatsoper – Berlin)
- The Barber of Seville, Rigoletto, Die Fledermaus (Houston Grand Opera)
- Tolomeo (Muziektheater Transparant – Belgium)
- Don Pasquale (Oper Leipzig)
- Radamisto (Handel Festspiele and Opernhaus Halle)
- A Streetcar Named Desire, Norma (Opera Theatre St Gallen – Switzerland)
- Così fan tutte (Guildhall School of Music and Drama – London),
- Albert Herring, Phaedra (Aldeburgh Festival – UK)
