= Donna E. Davies =

British biochemist and professor

Donna Davies FMedSci
- Born: Donna Elizabeth Harrison
- Education: University of Wales (BSc, PhD)
- Known for: Synairgen
- Scientific career
- Fields: Lung diseases Epithelial barrier function Innate immunity Tissue engineering
- Workplaces: University of Oxford; University of Southampton
- Thesis: Ribulose 1,5 - bisphosphate carboxylase from microorganisms (1979)
- Website: www.southampton.ac.uk/medicine/about/staff/donnad.page

Donna Elizabeth Davies (née Harrison) FMedSci is a British biochemist and professor of respiratory cell and molecular biology at the University of Southampton. In 2003, Davies was the co-founder of Synairgen, an interferon-beta drug designed to treat patients with asthma and chronic obstructive pulmonary disease.

== Early life and education ==
Davies started her scientific career at the University of Wales, where she graduated with a degree in biochemistry in 1975 before starting a PhD in microbial biochemistry. In 1979 she completed her graduate research, investigated the biochemistry of the most abundant enzyme on earth: ribulose-1-5-bisphosphate carboxylase (RuBisCO).

== Research and career ==
After completing her doctoral degree, Davies, joined the University of Oxford as a Lawrence Fellow of the British Diabetic Association where she worked with Frances Ashcroft. Her research looked at the secretion of insulin. In 1985 Davies moved to the medical oncology Unit at the University of Southampton. Here she was appointed a senior research fellow, promoted to Reader in 2002 and Professor in 2004. Her research investigates respiratory disease, with a focus on virus-induced aggravation of chronic obstructive pulmonary disease (COPD) and asthma. Lung diseases impact 1 in 7 people in the United Kingdom, and Davies research aims to establish the fundamental mechanisms of the diseases and apply this understanding to novel treatments.

Davies identified that in patients with asthma, the bronchial epithelial barrier is structurally and functionally compromised. This defective barrier may permit the passage of allergens into the tissue of the respiratory tract, which can activate the immune system and trigger the allergic inflammation in asthma patient's lungs. As a result, targeting this defective barrier may offer opportunity to help patients with difficult to treat asthma.

She has proposed that the reason common cold (rhinovirus) viruses can exacerbate asthma is because of a lesion in the immune response of epithelial cells in patients with asthma. As part of this work, she developed tissue engineered in vitro models of the human airway that allowed investigations without the use of animals. The models make use of human airway epithelial and dendritic cells from patients with and without asthma. She showed that the bronchial epithelial cells of asthmatic individuals have a deficient anti-viral response to rhinovirus infections; but suggested this can be corrected through the introduction of interferon-beta, an anti-viral protein. In 2003 Davies, Stephen Holgate and Ratko Djukanovic founded the University spin-off company Synairgen. Synairgen produce an inhaled interferon-beta drug (SNG001) that can treat patients with asthma and COPD that has been worsened by viruses.

Her research demonstrated that the epithelial mesenchymal trophic unit is activated in patients with chronic asthma, which contributes to the progression and severity of asthma because of aberrant repair response. Davies was appointed head of clinical and experimental sciences in the faculty of medicine in 2011.

During the COVID-19 pandemic it emerged that Synairgen's SNG001 was a potential treatment for COVID-19. In a clinical trial of one hundred hospitalised COVID-19 patients, patients treated with SNG001 were 80% less likely to develop a serious form of COVID-19. After news of the successful drug trail, share prices in Synairgen rose 540%.

=== Select publications ===
Davies publications include:

- Glucose induces closure of single potassium channels in isolated rat pancreatic β-cells
- Davies, Donna E.; Holgate, Stephen T.; Laza-Stanca, Vasile; Puddicombe, Sarah; Powell, Robert; Bucchieri, Fabio; Johnston, Sebastian L.; Wark, Peter A.B. (2005). "Asthmatic bronchial epithelial cells have a deficient innate immune response to infection with rhinovirus". Journal of Experimental Medicine. 201 (6). The Rockefeller University Press: 937–947. doi:10.1084/jem.20041901. ISSN 1540-9538. OCLC 679072706. PMC 2213100. PMID 15781584.
- Nelson, Harold S.; Davies, Donna E.; Wicks, James; Powell, Robert M.; Puddicombe, Sarah M.; Holgate, Stephen T. (2003). "Airway remodeling in asthma: New insights". Journal of Allergy and Clinical Immunology. 111 (2): 215–225. doi:10.1067/mai.2003.128. ISSN 0091-6749. PMID 12589337.

=== Awards and honours ===
Davies was elected a Fellow of the Academy of Medical Sciences (FMedSci) in 2014.
