= Perth Festival =

Australia's longest-running cultural festival

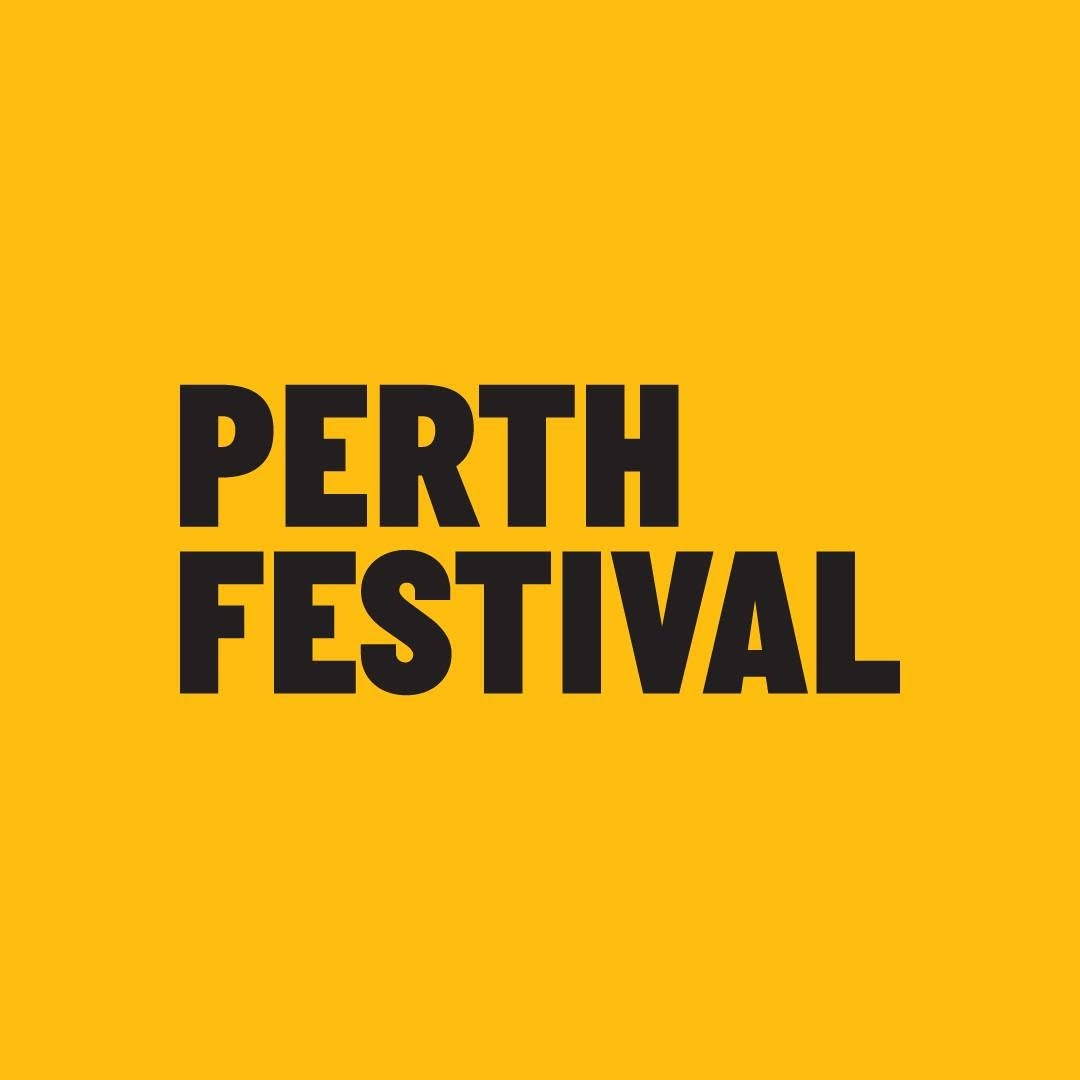

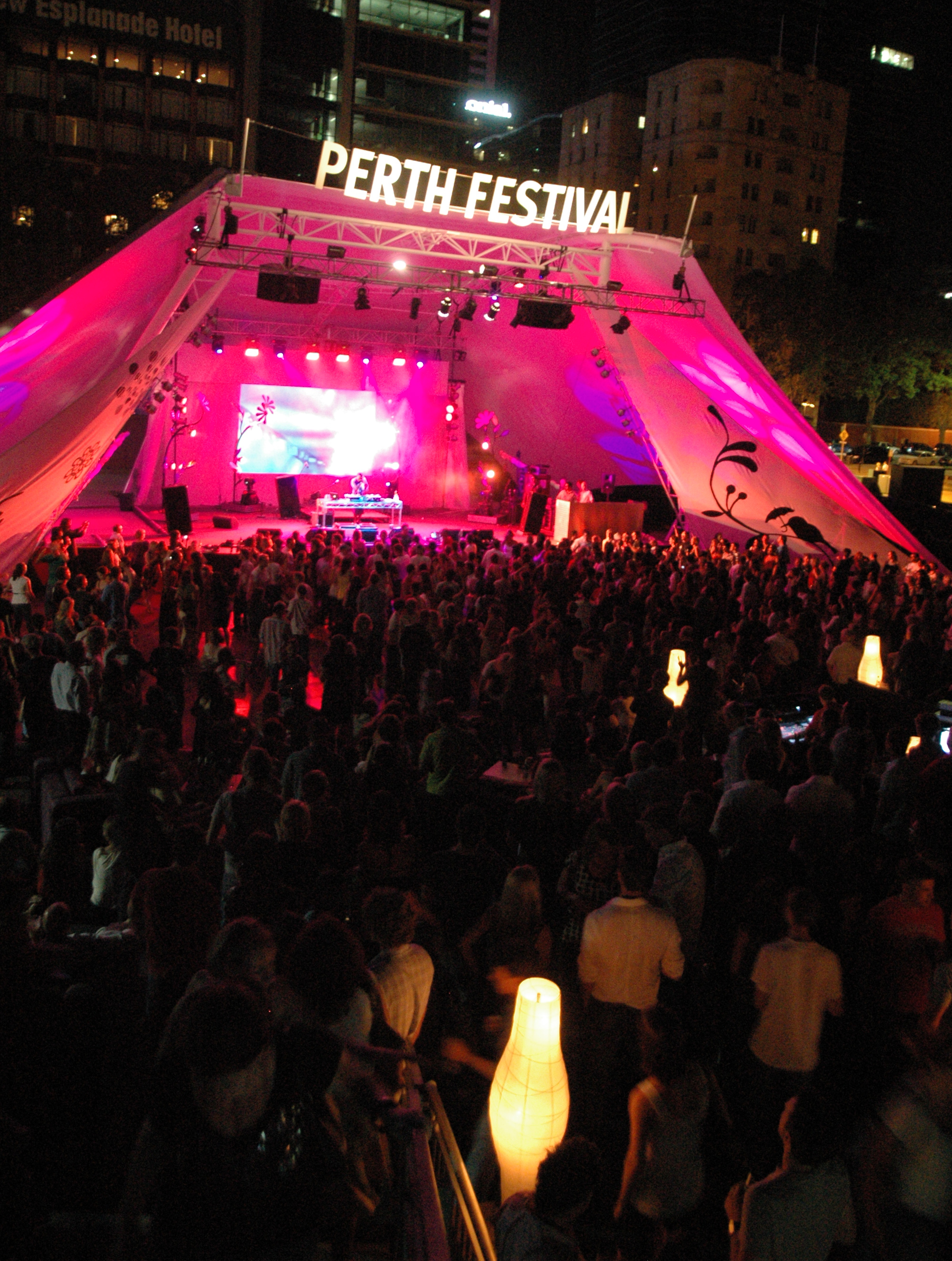
- Crowd at the Perth International Arts Festival Beck's Music Box, 2008
- Status: Active
- Genre: Arts festival
- Begins: February
- Ends: March
- Frequency: Annually
- Locations: Perth, Western Australia
- Country: Australia
- Years active: 72–73
- Inaugurated: 1953
- Founder: Fred Alexander
- Most recent: 2026
- Leader: Anna Reece; (Artistic Director); Marah Braye; (Chief Executive Officer)
- Website: Perth Festival

Perth Festival, named Perth International Arts Festival (PIAF) between 2000 and 2017, and sometimes referred to as the Festival of Perth, is Australia's longest-running cultural festival, held annually in Western Australia. The program features contemporary and classical music, dance, theatre, performance, literature and ideas, visual arts, large-scale public works. The main events of the festival take place every year, from February to March and the film program now known as Lotterywest Films runs from November to April, as part of the Perth Festival.

Perth Festival takes place and various indoor and outdoor venues across Perth. The festival is run by UWA in partnership with the state government and the Perth City Council. From 2004, the Festival carried Lotterywest branding, and Lotterywest was acknowledged as the Festival's "principal partner".

The artistic director for 2025 to 2028 is Anna Reece.

== History ==
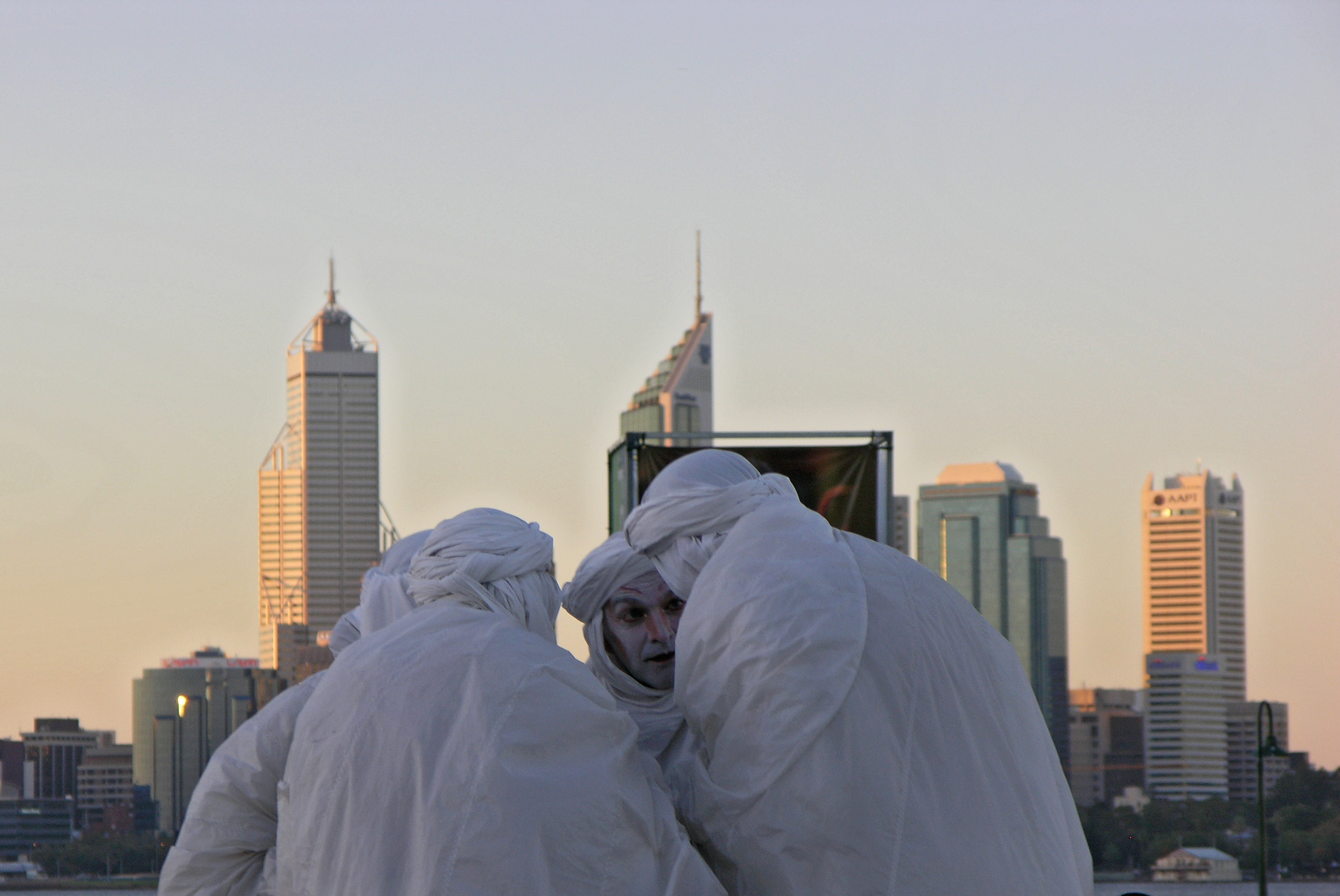
Street performers, Quidams, walking through the crowd at the Perth International Arts Festival, South Perth Foreshore, March 2007

The festival was created in 1953 by the University of Western Australia, making it the oldest international arts festival in Australia, and the oldest annual international multi-arts festival in the southern hemisphere.

The founder of the festival was a then UWA professor, Fred Alexander, Director of Adult Education, who was inspired by attending the Edinburgh Festival in 1951. Alexander's aim was "to offer the best cultural events that are available from British, European, American, Asian and Australian sources". The first festival, held in 1953, showcased theatre, ballet and film, drawing an audience of 42,000 people despite little publicity. It was held over the summer school holidays in January, for Summer School students, arranged by John Birman as a more formal extension of his previous summer school programmes. The drama students would create outdoor productions starting in 1953 and continuing to 1969 directed by Jeana Bradley.

In 1964, the Shakespeare's 400th anniversary, the New Fortune Theatre opened in the Arts Building with a production of Hamlet directed by Jeanna Bradley. The theatre was (then) the only replica of the 1599 London Fortune Playhouse. Another notable anniversary for the festival were its 21st anniversary coinciding with the opening of the Perth Concert Hall, and in 1979 festival it celebrated the 150th anniversary of the founding of the colony in 1829. In 1987 the festival opened at the same time as the final races of the America's Cup yacht race.

The festival expanded off-campus citywide in the 1960s, and by 1980 had hugely increased its audience, with an increase of 300 percent in paid attendances between 1976 and 1980. A publication produced in 1973 to inform UK citizens considering migrating to WA, described the festival thus:

The Festival of Perth has been rightly described as "culture in shirtsleeves". For several weeks in summer, there is a feast of all types of entertainment - from jazz to organ recitals, poetry readings to film festivals. Much of it takes place in the open air. On balmy summer nights, informally dressed audiences sit on grassy lawns, under tall pines, to watch films, or in open amphitheatres to hear Beethoven or watch a Shakespeare play. Its uniquely summer setting provides some piquant and refreshing contrasts of mood.

Some sources refer to it as the Festival of Perth in the 1980s. The festival broadened its appeal, and in 1999 the newly appointed artistic director, Séan Doran, announced a change of name to the Perth International Arts Festival, leading up to its 50th anniversary in 2003.

In 2004, the festival started carrying the Lotterywest branding, and Lotterywest was referred to as its "principal partner" in all communications. With new artistic director Lindy Hume and a new four-year strategic plan, there was a significant shift in direction for the festival: towards increased community involvement, and developing stronger partnerships with local arts organisations and regional centres.

The branding was changed to simply "Perth Festival" by then director Wendy Martin and the board in 2018, although the registered company name was as of July 2020 still Perth International Arts Festival, as "the organiser of Perth Festival".

=== Artistic Directors ===
- John Birman (1955–1974)
- David Blenkinsop (1975–1999)
- Séan Doran (2000–2003)
- Lindy Hume (2004–2007)
- Shelagh Magadza (2008–2011)
- Jonathan Holloway (2012–2015)
- Wendy Martin (2016–2019)
- Iain Grandage (2020–2024)
- Anna Reece (2025–2028)

=== Chief Executive Officer ===
As of November 2025, Marah Braye is the Chief Executive Officer.

== Description ==
Activities across the state include theatre, dance, music, film, visual arts and literature. Artists from around the world have participated in the festival.

== Writers Festival ==
Earlier Perth Festivals had poetry and literature as a component of the larger festival. By the 1990s the Perth Writers Festival was titled and marketed separately, for some time known as the Alcoa Perth Writers Festival (named after its sponsor, Alcoa).

By the 2000s the Writers Festival was well recognised by publishers from interstate and overseas. Keynote speakers and featured authors since then have included notable writers from Australia and overseas, such as Germaine Greer, Hilary Mantel, Ahdaf Soueif (2013 opener), Ben Okri, Esi Edugyan and Chloe Hooper.

It retained the branding as Perth Writers Festival, taking place for three days over a weekend, until it was extended to a run for a full week in 2018, when it changed to Perth Writers Week. It took place not only at the University Club of Western Australia, but also in public libraries, in bars and on the streets of the city. This continued in 2019.

In 2020 the programme was pared back to a weekend, and marketed as the Perth Festival's Literature & Ideas Weekend. The Literature & Ideas curator was author Sisonke Msimang.

== Film programs ==
=== 1953–1985 ===
Films formed part of the Perth Festival's offerings since its inception in January 1953, being shown at the Somerville Auditorium at UWA. The first artistic director, John Birman, introduced many foreign films, and there was resistance at first. In 1957 a French film festival was held, and in 1959 the festival became for Birman "the establishment of an international film festival within the festival".

David Blenkinsop, taking over the reins of the Perth Festival in 1977, had a bigger budget to work with, and along with Sherry Hopkins, brought in a system whereby a committee would preview all films before deciding whether to include them in the film festival. Audiences rose from 21,000 in 1977 to 65,000 in 1985, but the festival was no longer bringing new films into the country, leaving that to Sydney and Melbourne. It did, however, make the Festival of Perth unique, being the only arts festival that had a successful film component attached to it.

=== 1986 to present ===
With the Lotterywest rebranding and its acknowledgement as "principal partner" of PIAF in 2004, it was in this year that the film component took on the title of Lotterywest Films, and variants.

In 2010, Madeleine Bates, was appointed to the role of Program Manager: Film, after being head of film screenings at the Edinburgh International Film Festival.

As of 2020 and for some years previously, the film festival part of the Perth Festival is known as Lotterywest Films. Tom Vincent was film manager from 2014 to 2024. He was succeeded by Madeline Bates, who returned to the Festival as Film Curator in mid-2024.

== Funding ==
The festival was founded by and has operated from the University of Western Australia Nedlands campus since 1953. The University of Western Australia further supports the festival through the provision of services and resources. Lotterywest has supported the festival financially since 1992.

The festival also relies on corporate sponsors and partnerships for funding, with new organisations becoming involved each year.

== Corporate partners ==
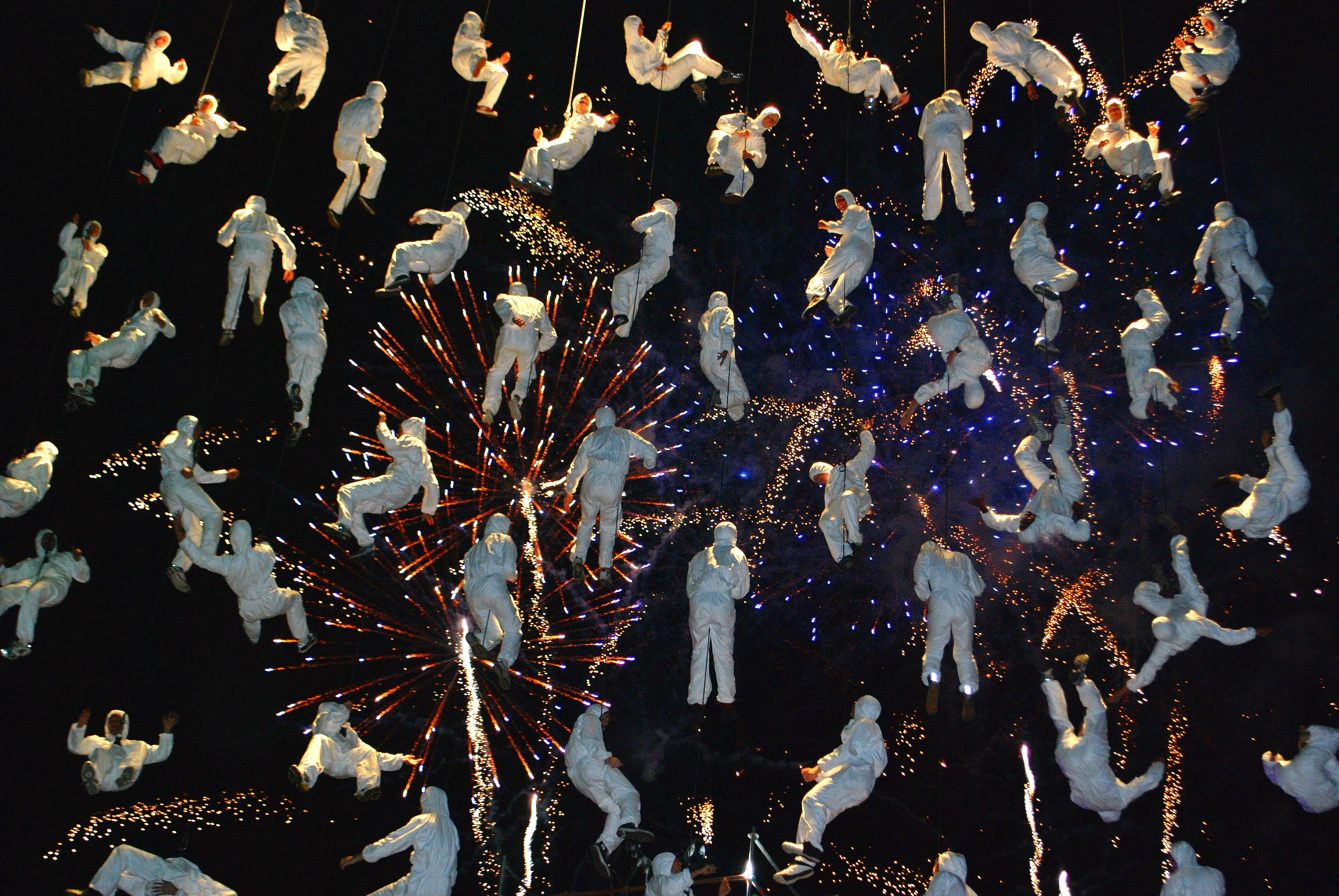
La Fura dels Baus display at the 2010 opening night

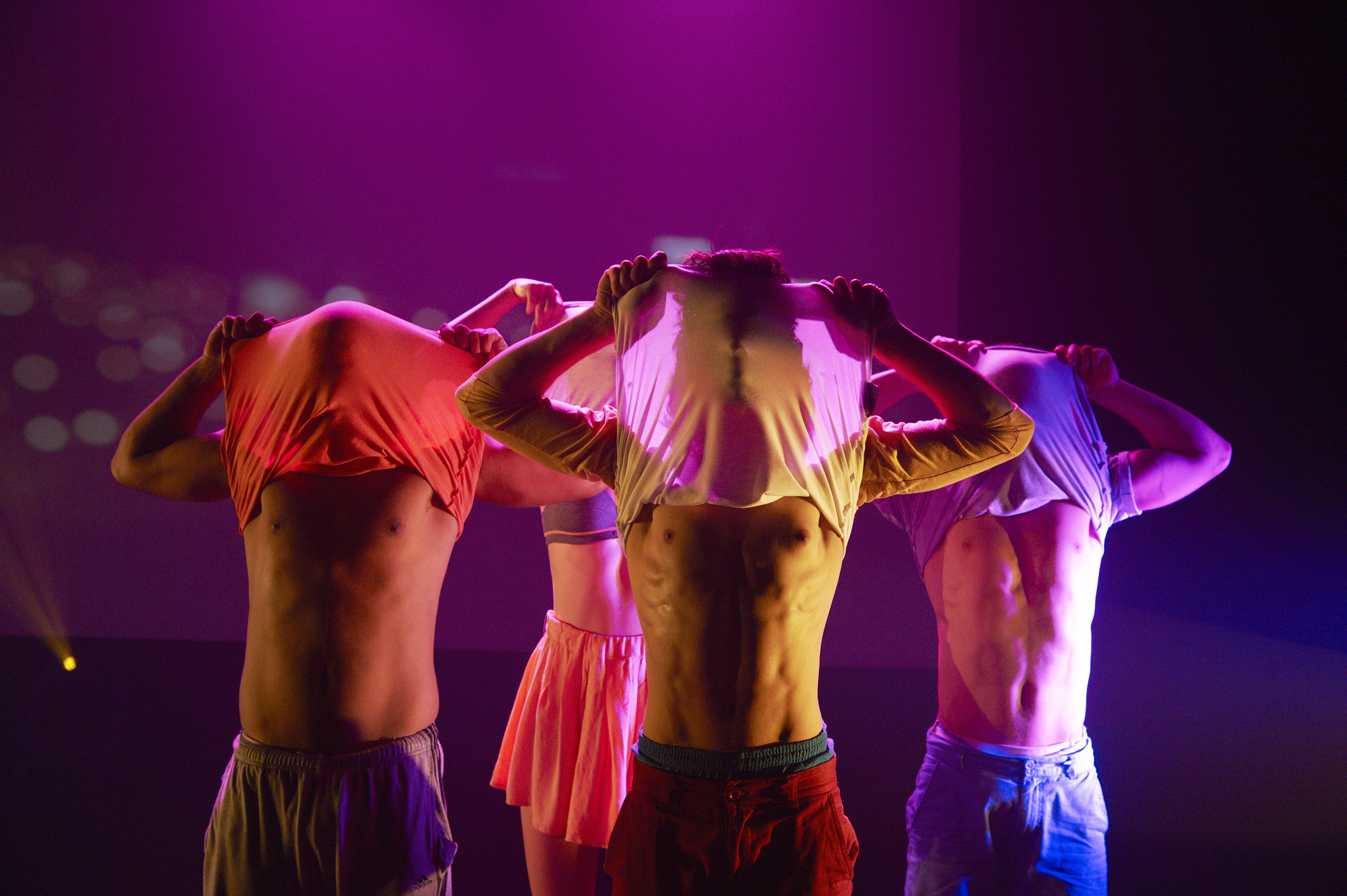
Driving into Walls dress-rehearsal, February 2012

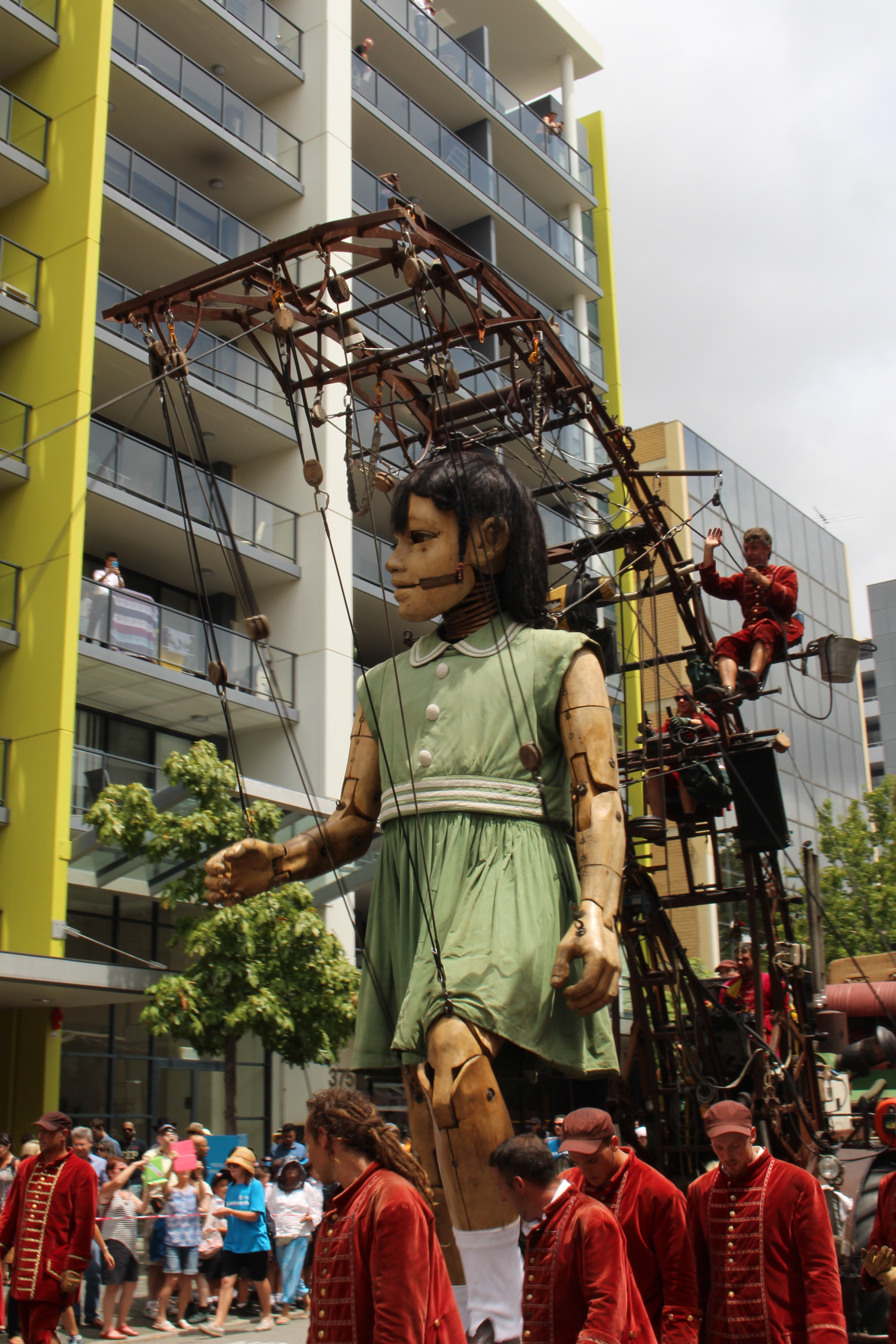
Royal de Luxe: The Incredible and Phenomenal Journey of the Giants to the Streets of Perth, 2015

The array of corporate partners changes each year, however some partners have committed to long term sponsorship of the festival. The partners are separated into six distinct groups:

1. Partners
2. Leadership partners
3. Major Partners
4. Public Funding Partners
5. Trusts
6. International Partners

Significant long term partners include Lotterywest and Wesfarmers.

== Festival venues ==
Venues for festival events have included:

- Somerville Auditorium, University of Western Australia
- Joondalup Pines
- His Majesty's Theatre
- State Theatre Centre of Western Australia
- Festival Gardens, Perth Cultural Centre
- Regal Theatre
- ABC Perth Studios
- Octagon Theatre UWA
- Subiaco Arts Centre
- Perth Concert Hall
- St Georges Terrace
- Nedlands Park Masonic Hall
- Fremantle Arts Centre
- Red Hill Auditorium
- Cottesloe Beach
- Quarry Amphitheatre
- Winthrop Hall, University of Western Australia
- Lawrence Wilson Art Gallery
- John Curtin Gallery, Curtin University
- Perth Institute of Contemporary Arts
- Crown Perth Theatre
- Western Australian Museum
- State Library of Western Australia
- Former Playhouse Theatre
- State Theatre Centre of Western Australia
- East Perth Power Station

== Selected festivals ==
=== 2012 festival ===
The 2012 festival was the 60th Perth International Arts Festival. This year attracted 194,522 paid audience members and a total attendance figure of over 700,000. The opening of the festival featured a 'DAWN:DUSK' opening, where hundreds of people gathered on Cottesloe Beach to watch vocalists and musicians. The festival was held from 10 February to 4 March, and was the first year led by new artistic director, Jonathan Holloway. A number of events sold out during this year's festival, including tickets to Bon Iver.

=== 2013 festival ===
The 2013 festival was held from 8 February to 2 March. With 750 artists, 820 events and 250 film screenings, it is the biggest yet. This year marked the announcement of a new significant partner, Chevron Corporation. This partnership was recognised through the renaming of the Festival Gardens to Chevron Festival Gardens.

At the 2012/2013 Lotterywest Films, 26 films were screened, with the winner of the BHP Billiton audience award being The First Grader, directed by Justin Chadwick. This year also featured sold-out event, Macklemore & Ryan Lewis, who played at the Chevron City Gardens.

=== 2014 festival ===
The 2014 festival was the 62nd Perth International Arts Festival held from 7 February until 1 March 2014.

== Live @ The Watershed ==
=== 2001 Festival ===
The festival had an outdoor concert series that featured an elaborate venue that transformed a common area of the city into a water themed futuristic type atmosphere. It was held over the pond area outside of the Art Gallery Of Western Australia and the Perth Cultural Centre. The festival spanned 26 days and headlined by acts such as the Black Eyed Peas and Proton, both of which sold out the venue.
