= William Holloway (cricketer) =

English cricketer and British Army officer

William Octavius Holloway (15 September 1870 – 2 December 1907) was a British Army officer and an English cricketer active from 1890 to 1902 who played for Sussex.

== Cricket ==
He was born in Charlbury, Oxfordshire and died in Farnborough, Hampshire. He appeared in four first-class matches and scored 36 runs with a highest score of 18 not out.

== Military career ==
Holloway was commissioned a second lieutenant in the Royal Artillery on 25 July 1890, and promoted to lieutenant on 25 July 1893. He was seconded as adjutant of the 4th West Riding of Yorkshire Volunteer Artillery on 1 March 1899. He was promoted to captain on 13 February 1900.
