= John Strange (cricketer) =

English cricketer

Personal information
- Full name: John Strange
- Born: c. 1818; St John's Wood, Middlesex, England
- Died: 6 September 1840 (aged 22); Paris, France
- Batting: Unknown

Domestic team information
- Years: Team
- 1836–1839: Marylebone Cricket Club

Career statistics
Competition	First-class
Matches	13
Runs scored	107
Batting average	4.86
100s/50s	–/–
Top score	23*
Balls bowled	?
Wickets	38
Bowling average	?
5 wickets in innings	2
10 wickets in match	–
Best bowling	6/?
Catches/stumpings	10/–
- Source: Cricinfo, 3 August 2020

John Strange (c. 1818 – 6 September 1840) was an English first-class cricketer.

The son of John Strange senior, he was born in 1818 at St John's Wood. He was educated at Winchester College. Strange later played first-class cricket for the Marylebone Cricket Club (MCC) from 1836 to 1839, making eleven appearances. Playing primarily as a bowler, he took 32 wickets in his eleven matches and twice took a five wicket haul. In addition to playing for the MCC, Strange also made two first-clas appearances for the Gentlemen in the Gentlemen v Players fixtures of 1836 and 1838 at Lord's, taking four wickets. Strange died at Paris in September 1840.
