= Elsie Holloway =

Canadian photographer

- Elizabeth-Mary “Elsie” Holloway
- Born: 1882; St. John's, Colony of Newfoundland
- Died: 1971 (aged 88–89); St. John's, Newfoundland, Canada
- Known for: Photographer

Elsie Holloway (1882–1971) was a Canadian photographer known for her portraits and historical events in Newfoundland.

== Biography ==
Elizabeth-Mary "Elsie" Holloway was born in St. John's in 1882. She was the daughter of Henrietta Palfrey and Robert E. Holloway. Her father was a college professor and amateur landscape photographer who introduced his two children, Bert and Elsie, to photography.

In the early 1900s, after their father's death, Elsie and Bert established the Holloway Studio in St. John's, which was among the first portrait studios in Newfoundland. Bert specialized in landscapes and Elsie specialized in portraits.

In 1915, Bert enlisted for service in World War I and died at the battle of Monchy-le-Preux in 1917.

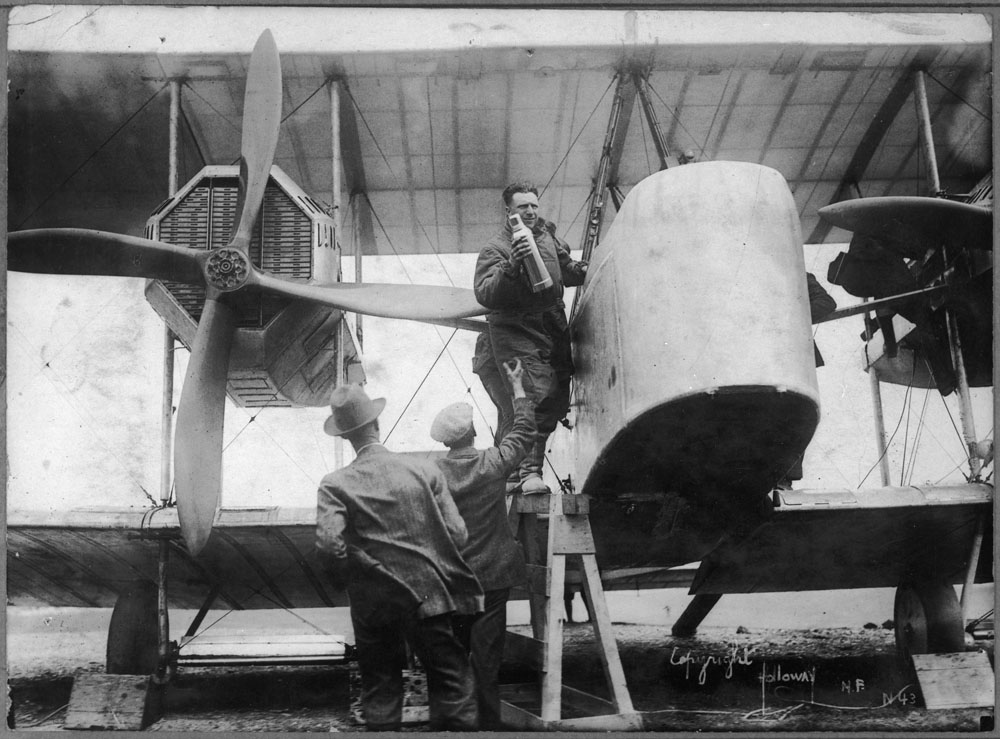
Holloway's photograph of Captain John Alcock stowing provisions aboard Vickers Vimy aircraft before its trans-Atlantic flight on 14 June 1919

Elsie, meanwhile made portraits of many of the Newfoundland Regiment enlistees in St. John's.

After the war, Holloway kept the studio open, and continued to create portraits and landscape photographs. Notably, she photographed Alcock and Brown in 1919 before their successful Trans-Atlantic crossing, and Amelia Earhart's 1932 flight from Harbour Grace, where Earhart began her solo transatlantic flight.

In 1946, Holloway retired and sold her studio. She died in 1971 in St. John's. Regrettably, many of Holloway's glass negatives were stripped of their emulsion and used to build a greenhouse.

== Further information ==
- With the Camera: The Life of Elsie Holloway Newfoundland and Labrador Heritage video
