= Barking Gecko Arts =

Western Australian theatre company

Barking Gecko Arts is a Western Australian professional theatre company for children and families. It was known variously as Barking Gecko Theatre Company, Barking Gecko Theatre and Barking Gecko until it re-merged with Awesome Arts in 2024, from which it had split in 1996.

== History ==
John Saunders founded Acting Out in 1989 as a theatre company for children, touring schools and rural areas in Western Australia. The company became an independent, not-for-profit theatre company for young people and their families the same year under artistic director Grahame Gavin, renaming to Barking Gecko, also known as Barking Gecko Theatre and Barking Gecko Theatre Company.

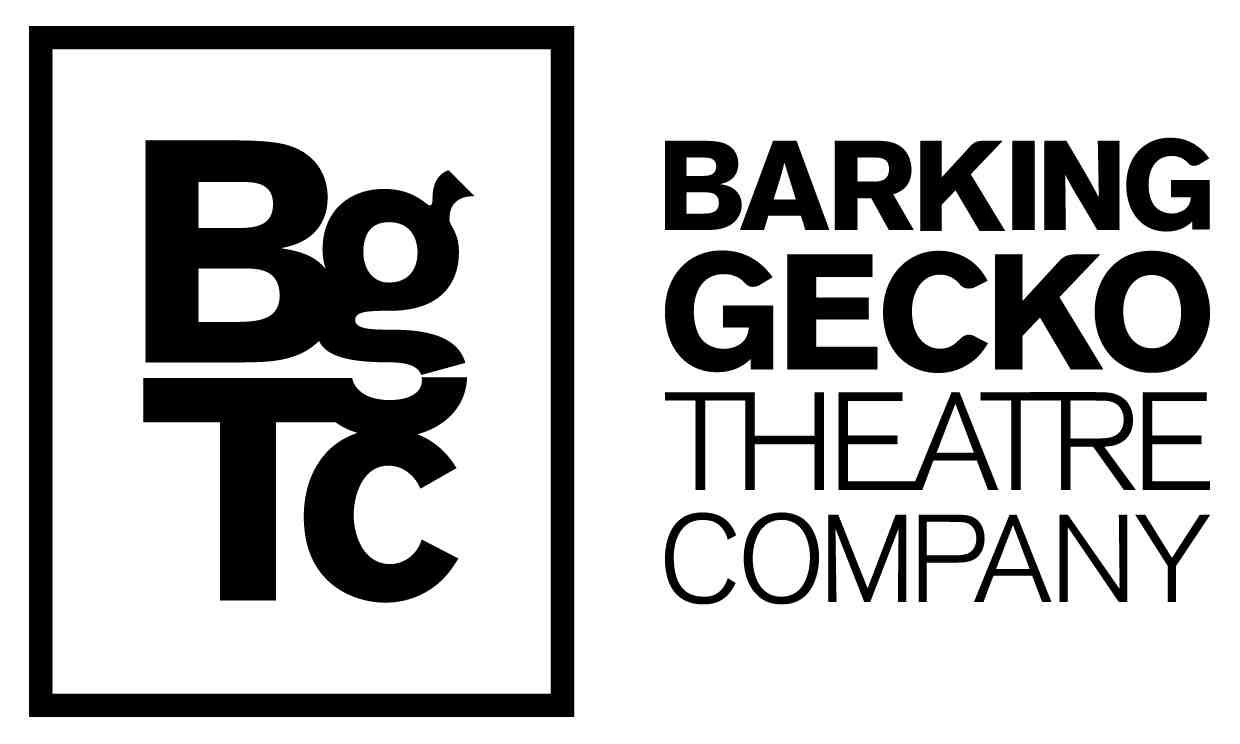
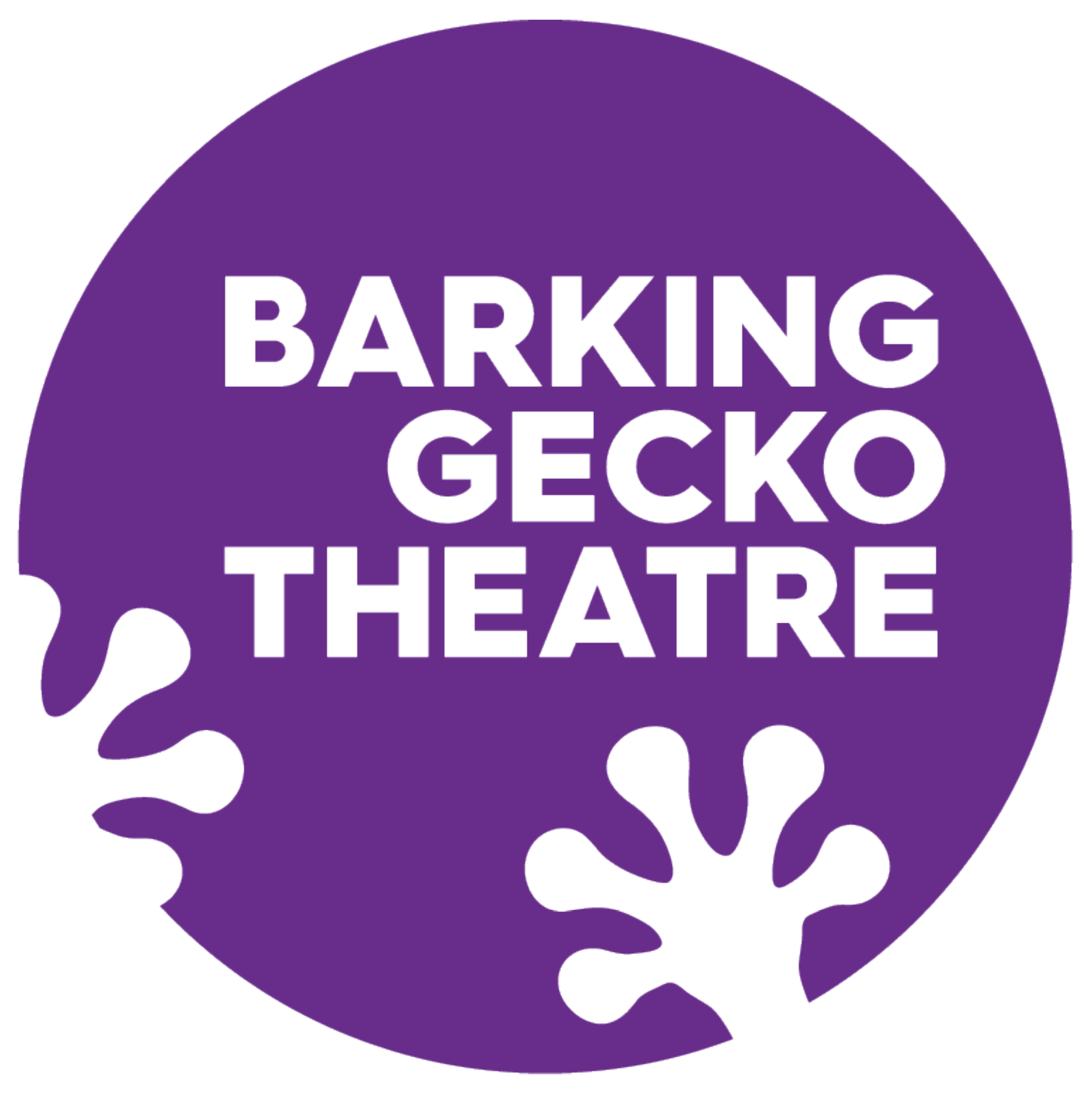
Logos of former Barking Gecko Theatre

In 1996, Awesome Arts split from Barking Gecko Theatre, and started presenting the annual Awesome International Arts Festival for Bright Young Things in Perth in the September school holidays each year.

The company has performed plays by Suzie Miller, including Driving Into Walls (2012) and Onefivezeroseven (2014), but its most notable productions include Rabbits in 2015, Bambert's Book of Lost Stories in 2016, and House in 2021 and 2024.

In 2024, David Templeman, Minister for Arts and Culture, announced that Barking Gecko Theatre and Awesome Arts would merge as Barking Gecko Arts. Jenny Simpson would be festival director.

== Description ==
Barking Gecko Arts is resident at the State Theatre Centre of Western Australia, performing in the Heath Ledger and Studio Underground theatres. It also performs in school classrooms, halls, site-specific non-theatre venues and outdoor locations. The company tours productions across Australia, and has toured to Canada, US, Singapore, Japan, Hong Kong, Korea, Thailand, Indonesia, and Mexico.

The company also delivers drama programs for children aged 4 to 18 across Perth, as well as regional and remote Western Australia.

Barking Gecko Arts is a not-for-profit organisation, governed by a board of directors. Receiving federal and state government arts funding, as well as corporate sponsorship and ticket revenue, the company has an annual turnover of more than A$1.2 million in 2014-2015 and employs more than 60 artists each year, primarily from Western Australia.

== Artistic directors ==
- 1989–1989: John Saunders (Acting Out)
- 1989–2006?: Grahame Gavin
- 2006–2010: Jeremy Rice
- 2010–2014: John Sheedy
- 2015–2025: Matt Edgerton
- 2025–present: Sam Longley

== Awards ==
=== 2015 ===
The Rabbits won several awards, including:

- Helpmann Award – Best Presentation for Children
- Helpmann Award – Best New Australian Work
- Helpmann Award – Best Costume Design, Gabriela Tylesova
- Helpmann Award – Best Original Score, Kate Miller-Heidke with Iain Grandage
- Performing Arts WA Award – Best Production
- Performing Arts WA Award – Best Lighting, Trent Suidgeest

=== 2016 ===
Bambert's Book of Lost Stories had a nomination and a win:

- Helpmann Award – Best Presentation for Children
- Helpmann Award Nomination – Best New Australian Work

=== 2017 ===
- Performing Arts WA Award – Best Supporting Actor, St John Cowcher for My Robot
