= Vernon Holloway =

American businessman and politician

Vernon Caryle Holloway Sr.
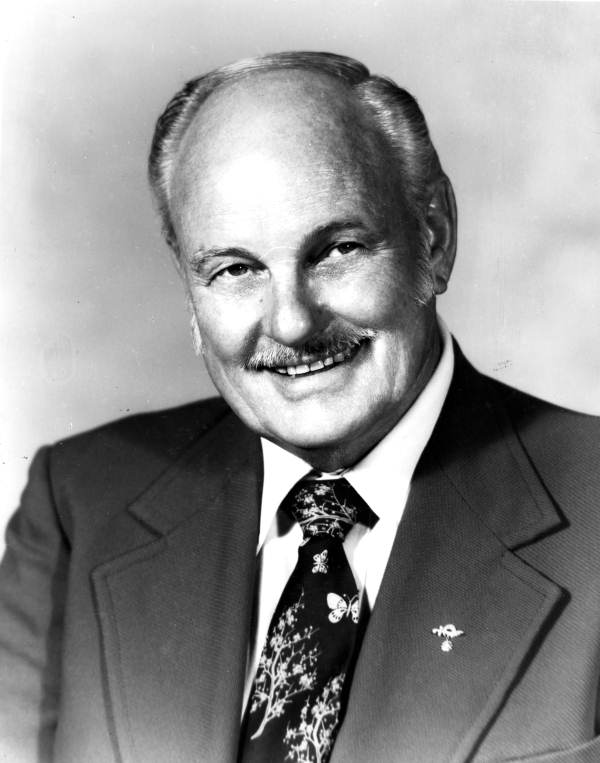

Member of the Florida Senate from the 39th district
- In office November 5, 1974 – November 4, 1980
- Preceded by: Richard A. Pettigrew
- Succeeded by: Dick Renick

Member of the Florida House of Representatives from the 116th district
- In office November 7, 1972 – November 5, 1974
- Succeeded by: Robert W. McKnight

Member of the Florida House of Representatives from the 102nd district
- In office 1967 – November 7, 1972
- Succeeded by: Ted Cohen

Personal details
- Born: September 15, 1919 Richmond, Virginia, U.S.
- Died: January 15, 2000 (aged 80)
- Party: Democratic
- Spouse: Roberta G.
- Children: Jean Estelle(d), Vernon Jr.(s), Lee Anthony(s)

Vernon Caryle Holloway Sr. (September 15, 1919 – January 15, 2000) was a businessman and politician in Florida, United States.

== Biography ==
He was born in Richmond, Virginia. He founded Interstate Electric Company, Inc. (1949) in Dade County, Florida. He served eight years in the Florida House of Representatives and six years in the Florida Senate, representing the 39th District in Miami. He lived in Tallahassee. Senator Holloway died on January 15, 2000, at the age of 80.
