= Charles Holloway (cricketer) =

English cricketer

Charles Holloway (born 1789 in England; died 23 October 1846 at Stockbridge, Hampshire) was an English professional cricketer who played from 1816 to 1822. He played for Hampshire and made 13 known appearances in important matches. He represented the Players in the Gentlemen v Players series.
