= Charles A. Holloway =

American educator (1936–2026)

- Born: May 28, 1936; Whittier, California, U.S.
- Died: June 14, 2026 (aged 90); Stanford, California, U.S.
- Education: University of California, Los Angeles; University of California, Berkeley
- Known for: Founder of the Center for Entrepreneurial Studies at the Stanford Business School
- Spouse: Christina A. Holloway
- Children: 3
- Scientific career
- Workplaces: Stanford University; SRI International

Charles Arthur Holloway (May 28, 1936 – June 14, 2026) was an American educator who was a professor at Stanford University's Graduate School of Business starting in 1968 and was a member of SRI International's board of directors from 2003 until his death in 2026.

In 1990, he founded the Alliance for Innovative Manufacturing at Stanford. He was also a co-founder of the Stanford Center for Entrepreneurial Studies and served on the boards of Annuity Systems, Freedom Financial Corporation, Lexy, Neato Robots and Occam.

Holloway died on June 14, 2026, at the age of 90.
