= Isaac Holloway =

American politician (1805–1885)

Member of the Ohio Senate from the 20th district
- In office 1858–1860
- Preceded by: Charles Warfel
- Succeeded by: Marshall McCall

Personal details
- Born: December 27, 1805 Stafford County, Virginia, U.S.
- Died: July 1885 (aged 79)
- Resting place: Kennon, Ohio, U.S.
- Party: Free Soil; Republican
- Spouse(s): Harriet Sheetz (m. 1831; died 1847) Ann Eliza Norton (m. 1850)
- Children: 3
- Occupation: Politician; educator; businessman

Isaac Holloway (December 27, 1805 – July 1885) was an American politician from Ohio. He served as a member of the Ohio Senate from 1858 to 1860.

== Early life ==
Isaac Holloway was born on December 27, 1805, at the family plantation in Stafford County, Virginia. He was educated by local teachers. In 1828, he moved to Wrightstown, Ohio (later Belmont). He attended school for six months there.

== Career ==
Holloway worked as a teacher in the Belmont County area of Ohio. He later worked in the mercantile business in Rockhill for five years. He then moved to Flushing and continued to work in the mercantile business.

Holloway worked as justice of the peace for 15 years. He was a delegate to the 1848 Free Soil National Convention in Buffalo, New York. In 1857, as a Republican, he was elected to the Ohio Senate. He served from 1858 to 1860.

== Personal life ==
Holloway married Harriet Sheetz of Belmont County in 1831. They had four children, including Otho S., Anna N. and Nathan. She died in 1847. He married Ann Eliza Norton of Belmont County in May 1850. They had no children. His son Nathan was a captain in the Civil War and worked as a manufacturer in Wisconsin, Chicago and Ohio. Nathan Holloway built the Holloway Brick Plant in North Industry, Ohio.

Holloway died in July 1885. He was buried at a Baptist cemetery at Rock Hill in Kennon, Ohio.
