= Jack Holloway (ecologist) =

New Zealand alpine explorer and forest ecologist (1914–1977)

- Born: John Thorpe Holloway; 15 November 1914; Oxford, New Zealand
- Died: 10 June 1977 (aged 62); Christchurch, New Zealand
- Education: University of Otago
- Occupations: Chemist, Botanist, Mountaineer
- Years active: 1932–1975
- Notable work: The Mountains of New Zealand,The Indigenous Forest Resources of New Zealand,The National Forest Survey of New Zealand: 1955
- Spouse: Una Scott Stevenson (m. 1940; died 2013)
- Parent(s): John Ernest Holloway; Margaret Brenda North
- Relatives: Linda Holloway (daughter-in-law)
- Awards: Hector Memorial Medal and Prize (1966), Honorary Dsc from the University of Otago (1974), Honorary Membership from the New Zealand Institute of Foresters (1975)

John Thorpe Holloway (15 November 1914 – 10 June 1977) was a New Zealand alpine explorer and forest ecologist. He was born in Oxford, New Zealand, on 15 November 1914. He was the child of Margaret Brenda North and husband John Ernest Holloway, a vicar in the Anglican Church.

== Early life ==
Along with his mother and father, Holloway grew up in rural New Zealand until 1916. His family moved for several years until finally they settled down in the city of Dunedin. His father then became a lecturer of botany at the University of Otago. Jack Holloway spent most of his childhood attending a boarding school in Oamaru. As a small boy, he enjoyed climbing. After he graduated from the Waitaki Boys' High School in Oamaru he went on to further his schooling at the University of Otago, like his father before him. Holloway graduated in 1937 with a Master of Science degree and honours in botany and chemistry.

== Alpine exploration ==
By the 1930s, John Thorpe Holloway was an established mountaineer. He explored many places, but two of the most known explorations he led were on the Barrier and Olivine ranges. Over the course of eight years Holloway made over 50 new ascents on the Olivine and Barrier Ranges, including discovering twelve new passes, and he produced detailed maps. No one before Holloway had made maps of these mountain ranges. Once Holloway had mapped these new lands, exploration in New Zealand was changed. Holloway led many explorations during what were called the "depression years." He would often trade maps that he had made for food rations in order to survive. Holloway became a member of the New Zealand Alpine Club.

== New Zealand Forest Service ==
In 1938 Holloway sailed for Britain to undertake PhD studies in plant physiology at the Imperial College of Science and Technology and Rothamstead Experimental Station. The advent of the Second World War disrupted these plans, and he returned to New Zealand in November 1939 to enlist. Shortly after marrying Una Scott Stevenson, a lab technician, in March 1940 Holloway left New Zealand with the 11th Forest Company, Corps of New Zealand Engineers. Soon after he moved to the outskirts of London where he worked for four years in the sawmills. However, when Holloway was not working in the sawmills, he started a census of the woodlands that he was exposed to. In 1945, he joined the New Zealand Forest Service. Holloway began to work on the National Forest Survey. Holloway studied the forests of New Zealand and their native wildlife. These observational studies led to many of the papers that Holloway wrote in his life, including "Forests and Climates in South New Zealand." Holloway was the leader of the forest survey team, also comprising Jack Henry and J. Everett, on the 1949 New Zealand American Fiordland Expedition.

== Major research ==
One of the more prominent studies completed by Holloway was his study of deer species in Southland. In this study, he observed the impact of deer species on the Southland environment. Holloway not only noticed that the species just east of Southland were thriving, but the species in Southland were nearly diminished. He proposed that this change could be due to the "virgin environment." Holloway studied the Long Wood Range's deer population the most thoroughly. He found that the environment's deer population was the lowest in Southland due to newly operating sawmills and deforestation. Holloway believed heavily in the preservation of the natural world. After many studies Holloway stated that in order for society to thrive, then it must first think about its surroundings.
