= John Holloway (botanist) =

New Zealand anglican priest, botanist and university lecturer (1881–1945)

John Ernest Holloway, FRS (12 February 1881 – 6 September 1945) was a New Zealand Anglican priest, botanist and university lecturer.

== Biography ==
He was born in Christchurch, New Zealand, on 12 February 1881 and educated at Nelson College and Auckland University College, where he was awarded DSc in 1917. He married Margaret Brenda North in 1908 and they had a son, Jack Holloway on 15 November 1914.

He took holy orders and served the church from 1909 to 1922. He had developed, however, a keen interest in botany and was elected a Fellow of the Royal Society of New Zealand in 1921. He was appointed lecturer in charge of the Botanical Department, University of Otago in 1924. While at the University of Otago he mentored renowned botanists Dame Ella Orr Campbell and Greta Stevenson.

In 1937, he was elected a Fellow of the Royal Society of London, his candidature citation reading: "With the exception of a short period (1909–1912) spent in Yorkshire and South London, Dr Holloway was actively engaged in parish work in different parts of New Zealand from 1907 to 1922. Appointed Lecturer in 1924. The greater part of his research was done before he took up academic work. Distinguished for his original work on 'Lycopodium, Tmesipteris, Phylloglossum' and the Hymenphyllaceae (Trans NZ Institute: Annals of Botany); the first to give a complete account of the prothallus and embryogeny of 'Tmesipteris'. The quality of his work, which has made material contributions to morphological botany, is excellent and in the view of the fact that his researches were carried on in very difficult circumstances the quantity is remarkable. "

He died in Timaru, New Zealand, on 6 September 1945.
