= Jonathan Holloway (artistic director) =

British artistic director

Jonathan Holloway (born 15 January 1970) is an artistic director and theatre director. Originally from Sheffield in the north of England, he is currently the artistic director of Melbourne Festival. Previously he established the National Theatre's Watch This Space Festival, was artistic director and chief executive of the Norfolk and Norwich Festival and most recently the artistic director of the Perth International Arts Festival., which culminated with The Giants by Royal de Luxe, one of the largest arts events ever staged in Australia.

== Biography ==
Holloway grew up in Sheffield in the north of England. He studied drama at University of Exeter, and started his programming career whilst reading drama there, promoting and presenting bands and artists including The Sugarcubes, Thom Yorke (pre-Radiohead), Siouxsie and The Creatures, Transvision Vamp and The Inspiral Carpets.

He was resident theatre director of the Wilde Theatre in Bracknell (directing under the name Jack Holloway) and in July 2003 was creative director of Elemental, a large-scale theatre, music and spectacle event at Chalon dans la Rue festival in Chalon-sur-Saône, France.

From 1997–2004 he set up and ran the National Theatre's events department on London's South Bank, where he was the founding manager of Watch this Space, the Festival of Lights and co-wrote/directed Robin Hood in the National's Loft Theatre.

From 2004 to 2011 he was artistic director and chief executive of the Norfolk and Norwich Festival, during which time audiences grew from 35,000 to 278,000 and ticket sales tripled to over a third of a million Pounds, making it the fourth largest city arts festival in the UK.

In March 2015 he completed four years as artistic director of the Perth International Arts Festival. He commissioned and programmed Australian premieres including the final three piano etudes from Philip Glass; Landfall by Laurie Anderson and the Kronos Quartet; The Refusal of Time by William Kentridge; Between the Desert and the Deep Blue Sea: A Symphony for Perth by composer Tod Machover; keynote speeches from writers Martin Amis, Lionel Shriver and Margaret Atwood; Situation Rooms by Rimini Protokoll; and Scattered Light by Jim Campbell.

For the opening event for the 2012 Festival, Holloway programmed Place des Anges by Studio Cirque, which attracted 30,000 people, and won the Helpmann Award for Best Special Event.

His closing event in 2015 was The Giants by Royal de Luxe. Through many months of research and many trips to Western Australia, Royal de Luxe designed a story that drew as much from Nyoongar culture as it did from the legacy and myth of the ANZACs.

In January 2015 Holloway was appointed artistic director of Australia's Melbourne International Arts Festival.

== Boards ==
- Holloway has been the chair of Total Theatre Network (the UK's national development agency for physical and visual theatre)
- He has been on the Executive of the British Arts Festivals Association, the national membership body for arts festivals in the UK
- From 2012 to 2015 he was an ambassador for Children and Young People of WA

== Honours ==
- In 2015 he was bestowed Honorary Citizenship of the City Of Perth
- He is a fellow of the Royal Society for the Arts

== Personal ==
As of January 2015 Holloway lived in Melbourne with his wife Jenny Vila and two children
