= John Holloway (athlete) =

Irish-British decathlete

Personal information
- Nationality: Irish
- Born: 9 December 1878; County Tipperary, Ireland
- Died: 15 October 1950 (aged 71); Topeka, United States

Sport
- Sport: Track and field
- Event: All-around

John Holloway (9 December 1878 – 15 October 1950) was an Irish athlete. He participated in the men's all-around (a forerunner to the modern decathlon) at the 1904 Summer Olympics, placing fourth.
