= Stephen Holgate (physician) =

British physician (born 1947)

Professor Sir Stephen Holgate CBE FRCP FRCPE FRCPath FMedSci FRSB MAE
- Born: Stephen Townley Holgate; 2 May 1947 (age 79); Heywood, Lancashire, England
- Occupation: Physician
- Spouse: Elizabeth Holgate
- Children: 4

Sir Stephen Townley Holgate (born 2 May 1947) is a British physician who specializes in immunopharmacology, respiratory medicine and allergies, and asthma and air pollution, based at the University of Southampton and University Hospital Southampton NHS Foundation Trust, UK.

== Education ==
Holgate was educated at The King's School in Macclesfield until 1965, when he joined Charing Cross Hospital Medical School, London (now incorporated into Imperial College London) where he received a BSc and MB BS. After completing postgraduate medical training in London at the National Hospital for Nervous Diseases and the Royal Brompton Hospital, he moved to Salisbury and Southampton where he completed his specialist higher medical training in general and respiratory medicine.

While a Clinical Lecturer at the University of Southampton, he researched the link between asthma death and over-use of beta-adrenergic bronchodilator inhalers. In 1978, Holgate received a Doctor of Medicine (MD) degree from the University of London.

In 1980, Holgate completed a two-year post doctoral fellowship with K. Frank Austen at the Robert Brigham Hospital and Harvard University, Boston provided by the Dorothy Temple Cross MRC endowment and the Wellcome Trust.

== Career and research ==
In 1980, Holgate began work at the University of Southampton researching the causes of human asthma and its treatment. After establishing the role that mast cells and other effector cells play in triggering the acute allergic inflammatory response in asthma, he examined the mechanisms of asthma chronicity and variability.

In 2002, Holgate collaborated with Donna Davies and Genome Therapeutics Corporation in Waltham, Mass, USA to identify the first novel asthma susceptibility gene of ADAM33 that encodes a metalloprotease linked to airway hyperresponsiveness and remodelling. This originated from the theory that in severe asthma, the airways behaved like a chronic wound with impaired epithelial repair and underlying tissue remodelling involving the deposition of new matrix, mucous metaplasia and proliferation of smooth muscle.

Holgate and his research group demonstrated the causal link between exacerbations in the autumn and winter months and respiratory virus infections. This led to the subsequent discovery that epithelial cells from those with moderate-severe asthma were deficient in their ability to generate an innate interferon beta response when infected by human rhinoviruses.

In 2003 Holgate, Donna Davies and Ratko Djukanovic used this patented information to create the University spin-off company Synairgen to explore the potential therapeutic benefits of inhaled interferon beta in attenuating virus-induced exacerbations of asthma and COPD. Synairgen completed a Phase II placebo-controlled trial to treat COVID-19.

== Awards and honours ==
Holgate was appointed Commander of the Order of the British Empire (CBE) in 2011 and was knighted in 2020 for services to medical research. He was elected a Fellow of the Academy of Medical Sciences (FMedSci) in 1998.
