= Athletics at the 1904 Summer Olympics – Men's triathlon =

Men's athletic triathlon at the Games of the III Olympiad
- Venue: Francis Field
- Dates: July 1–2, 1904
- Competitors: 118 from 4 nations

Medalists
1st place, gold medalist(s)		Max Emmerich	United States
2nd place, silver medalist(s)		John Grieb	United States
3rd place, bronze medalist(s)		William Merz	United States

The men's triathlon was an unusual event conducted during the 1904 Summer Olympics. The International Olympic Committee lists it as part of the Athletics at the 1904 Summer Olympics programme, though other sources list it among the Gymnastics at the 1904 Summer Olympics events. Gymnasts rather than track and field athletes competed. However, the three events of the triathlon were decidedly athletic rather than gymnastic in nature, comprising the long jump, the shot put, and the 100 yard dash.

118 athletes from 3 nations competed.

The results from this event, as well as the gymnastics triathlon event, were used to determine scores for the gymnastics all-around event. Since 2021 the International Olympic Committee lists the medals won in this event as being part of the sport of Gymnastics Artistic under name "Individual All-Around, Field Sports Men".

== Results ==
Breakdowns of results in the three events are not known.

=== Totals ===
Place	Athlete	Score
Gold	Max Emmerich (USA)	35.7
Silver	John Grieb (USA)	34.0
Bronze	William Merz (USA)	32.9
4.	George Mayer (USA)	32.4
5.	John Bissinger (USA)	30.8
6.	Philip Kassel (USA)	30.1
7.	Christian Busch (GER)	30.0
7.	Fred Schmind (USA)	30.0
9.	Ernst Mohr (GER)	29.7
10.	Max Hess (USA)	29.6
10.	Otto Neimand (USA)	29.6
12.	Edward Siegler (USA)	29.2
13.	John Leichinger (USA)	29.1
14.	Otto Boehnke (USA)	28.7
14.	George Stapf (USA)	28.7
16.	Andrew Neu (USA)	28.6
17.	Robert Reynolds (USA)	28.5
17.	Frank Schicke (USA)	28.5
19.	Ernst Reckeweg (USA)	28.2
20.	Otto Steffen (USA)	28.0
21.	Wilhelm Weber (GER)	27.6
22.	Ragnar Berg (USA)	27.4
22.	Lorenz Spann (USA)	27.4
22.	Reinhard Wagner (USA)	27.4
25.	Theodore Gross (USA)	27.3
25.	Robert Herrmann (USA)	27.3
25.	Leander Keim (USA)	27.3
28.	Oluf Landnes (USA)	27.2
28.	Otto Wiegand (GER)	27.2
30.	William Berewald (USA)	27.0
30.	Willard Schrader (USA)	27.0
32.	Julius Lenhart (AUT)	26.8
33.	Henry Koeder (USA)	26.7
34.	Wilhelm Lemke (GER)	26.6
34.	Max Thomas (USA)	26.6
36.	Emil Beyer (USA)	26.5
36.	John Duha (USA)	26.5
36.	Edward Hennig (USA)	26.5
36.	Clarence Kiddington (USA)	26.5
40.	Anthony Jahnke (USA)	26.4
40.	Oliver Olsen (USA)	26.4
40.	Henry Prinzler (USA)	26.4
43.	Phillip Sontag (USA)	26.2
44.	Louis Hunger (USA)	25.9
44.	Louis Kniep (USA)	25.9
44.	Adolph Weber (GER)	25.9
47.	Charles Umbs (USA)	25.7
47.	John Wolf (USA)	25.7
49.	George Aschenbrener (USA)	25.5
49.	Rudolf Krupitzer (USA)	25.5
49.	J. Wassow (USA)	25.5
52.	Emil Rothe (USA)	25.4
52.	George Schroeder (USA)	25.4
54.	Otto Feyder (USA)	25.2
55.	Hugo Peitsch (GER)	25.1
55.	Louis Rathke (USA)	25.1
55.	Philip Schuster (USA)	25.1
55.	Harry Warnken (USA)	25.1
59.	Anton Heida (USA)	25.0
59.	Jacob Hertenbahn (GER)	25.0
59.	William Tritschler (USA)	25.0
62.	Harry Hansen (USA)	24.8
63.	Max Wolf (USA)	24.6
64.	William Andelfinger (USA)	24.5
64.	Charles Krause (USA)	24.5
64.	Adolf Spinnler (SUI)	24.5
67.	Bergin Nilsen (USA)	24.4
68.	Max Hess (USA)	24.3
68.	William Traband (USA)	24.3
70.	Robert Maysack (USA)	24.2
71.	George Mastrovich (USA)	24.1
72.	Charles Sorum (USA)	24.0
73.	Bernard Berg (USA)	23.9
74.	John Dellert (USA)	23.7
75.	Andreas Kempf (USA)	23.6
75.	Otto Thomsen (USA)	23.6
77.	Christian Deubler (GER)	23.5
77.	Edward Tritschler (USA)	23.5
79.	Ben Chimberoff (USA)	23.4
79.	Henry Kraft (USA)	23.4
81.	L. Guerner (USA)	23.2
82.	P. Gussmann (USA)	23.1
83.	Michael Lang (USA)	23.0
84.	P. Ritter (USA)	22.8
85.	Hy. Meyland (USA)	22.4
85.	Richard Tritschler (USA)	22.4
85.	Emil Voigt (USA)	22.4
88.	Otto Knerr (USA)	22.3
89.	Gustav Mueller (USA)	22.0
89.	Otto Roissner (USA)	22.0
91.	William Horschke (USA)	21.7
92.	Frank Raad (USA)	21.5
92.	Wilhelm Zabel (USA)	21.5
94.	Max Rascher (USA)	21.4
95.	William Kruppinger (USA)	21.3
95.	August Placke (USA)	21.3
95.	Rudolf Schrader (USA)	21.3
95.	Emil Schwegler (USA)	21.3
95.	Christian Sperl (USA)	21.3
100.	Martin Fischer (USA)	21.2
100.	Julian Schmitz (USA)	21.2
102.	William Herzog (USA)	21.1
102.	Arthur Rosenkampff (USA)	21.1
104.	Gustav Hämmerlin (USA)	20.9
104.	Paul Studen (USA)	20.9
106.	Martin Ludwig (USA)	20.4
107.	Charles Dellert (USA)	20.3
108.	John Messel (USA)	20.2
108.	Walter Real (USA)	20.2
108.	Arthur Sundbye (USA)	20.2
111.	M. Barry (USA)	20.1
112.	K. Woerner (USA)	19.7
113.	Edward Pueschell (USA)	19.3
114.	Charles Schwartz (USA)	19.1
115.	Curt Roedel (USA)	19.0
116.	Alvin Kritschmann (USA)	18.9
117.	William Friedrich (USA)	17.7
118.	George Eyser (USA)	13.5

== Sources ==
- International Olympic Committee results database
- De Wael, Herman (2001). "Athletics 1908". Herman's Full Olympians.
- Wudarski, Pawel (1999). "Wyniki Igrzysk Olimpijskich" (in Polish).
