= Gymnastics at the 1904 Summer Olympics – Men's artistic individual all-around =

Men's artistic individual all-around at the Games of the III Olympiad
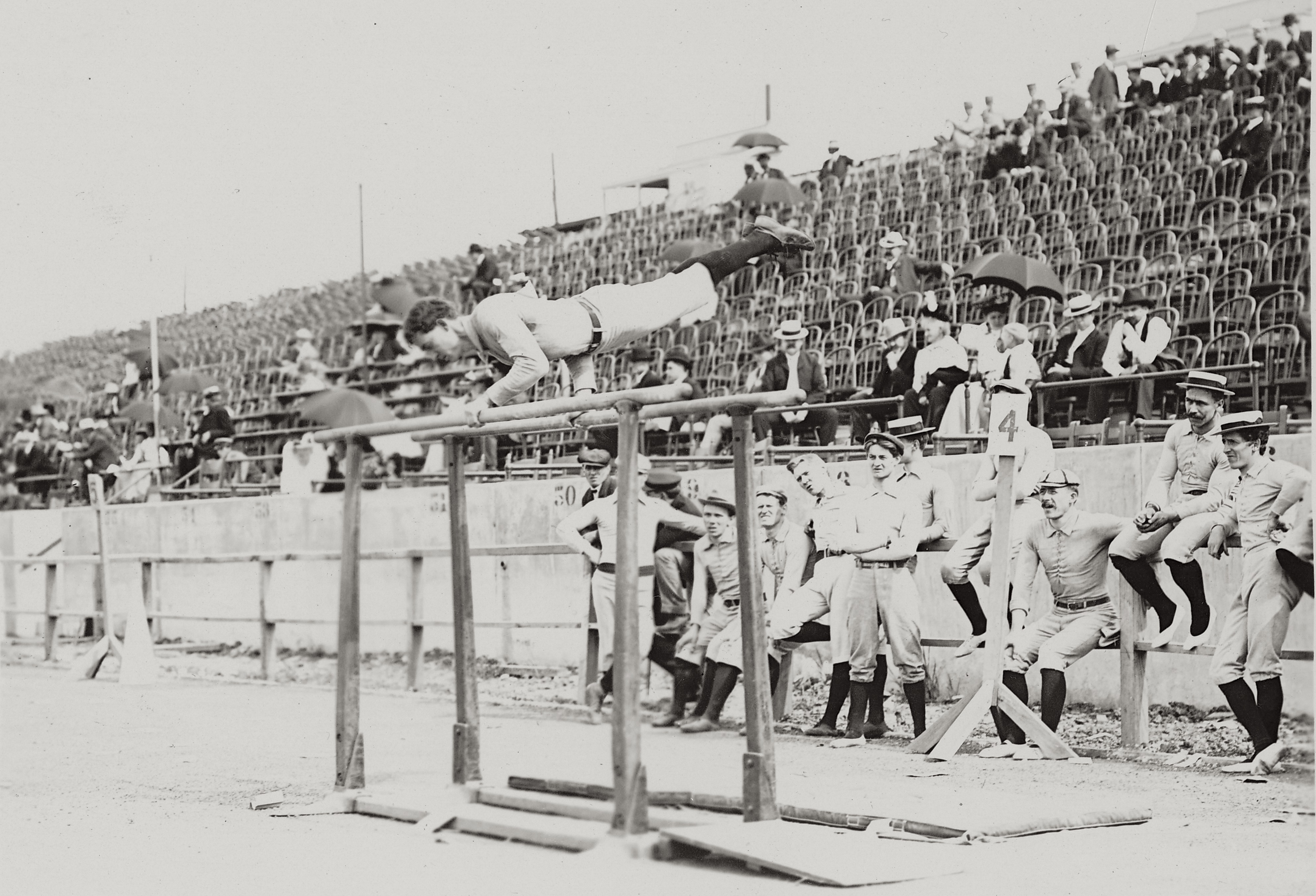
- Unknown athlete competing on the parallel bars
- Venue: Francis Field
- Dates: July 1–2, 1904
- Competitors: 119 from 3 nations
- Winning score: 69.80

Medalists
1st place, gold medalist(s)		Julius Lenhart; United States
2nd place, silver medalist(s)		Wilhelm Weber; Germany
3rd place, bronze medalist(s)		Adolf Spinnler; Germany

The men's artistic individual all-around was an artistic gymnastics event held as part of the gymnastics programme at the 1904 Summer Olympics. It was the second time an all-around event was held at the Olympics. The competition was held on Friday, July 1, 1904 and on Saturday, July 2, 1904. One hundred and nineteen gymnasts from three nations competed. The event was won by Julius Lenhart, an Austrian gymnast living in the United States and competing under the auspices of his Philadelphia-based club. Silver went to Wilhelm Weber of Germany, with bronze to Adolf Spinnler of Switzerland, competing for the German club Turnverein Esslingen. They were the first medals in the event for each of those nations, as France had swept the medals in 1900.

The medals won by Austrian Julius Lenhart and Swiss Adolf Spinnler are attributed by the International Olympic Committee (IOC) according to the national affiliation of the club or team they represented, rather than their nationality. (Note: In 2024, the IOC reinstated its original and current attribution policy for athletes at the early Olympic Games (1896, 1900, and 1904). From 2021 to 2024, the IOC briefly attributed medals in individual events according to the athlete's nationality, even when the athlete represented a foreign club or team. Since 2024, participation and medals have instead been attributed according to the national affiliation of the club/team represented by the athlete.) As Lenhart represented an American club and Spinnler a German club, their results are attributed to the United States and Germany, respectively.

The results from the athletics triathlon event and the gymnastics triathlon event were used to determine scores for this men's artistic gymnastics individual all-around event. The scores from this event, with some adjustments, were also used for the men's team event.

== Background ==
This was the second appearance of the men's individual all-around. The first individual all-around competition had been held in 1900, after the 1896 competitions featured only individual apparatus events. A men's individual all-around has been held every Games since 1900. At the time, it was common to include athletics events along with gymnastics competitions in a combined event such as this.

Another combined event was held in 1904, during the later October gymnastics events.

The United States made its debut in the event. Germany and Switzerland each made their second appearance, the only two nations to have competed at both editions of the event to that point.

== Competition format ==
The scores in the all-around were the sum of the results of the athletic triathlon and gymnastics triathlon events. They thus included competition in the 100 yard dash, long jump, shot put, horizontal bar, parallel bars, and horse (both vaulting horse and pommel horse).

For the gymnastics triathlon, each competitor performed a total of 9 routines—3 on each of the three apparatus. Each set of three routines included two compulsory exercises and one optional exercise. For the horse apparatus, there was one compulsory exercise in each of the vaulting horse and pommel horse, with the optional exercise being on the pommel horse. There was a maximum score of 5 points for each exercise, for a total of 15 points in each apparatus and 45 points for the triathlon.

In the athletics triathlon, the three events were the 100 yards, the long jump, and the shot put. There was no maximum score for each event, but rather a "standard" score of 10 and competitors would receive a score above or below 10 based on whether they performed better or worse than the "standard" result. In the 100 yards, the standard was 11.0 seconds, with a .1 point addition or subtraction for every .2 seconds faster or slower. In the long jump, the standard was 18 feet, with a .1 point addition or subtraction for each .1 feet longer or shorter. In the shot put, the standard was 30 feet, with a .1 point addition or subtraction for each .2 feet longer or shorter.

== Schedule ==
Date	Time	Round
Friday, 1 July 1904		Final
Saturday, 2 July 1904		Final, continued

== Results ==
Rank	Gymnast	Nation	Total
1st place, gold medalist(s)	Julius Lenhart (AUT)	United States	69.80
2nd place, silver medalist(s)	Wilhelm Weber	Germany	69.10
3rd place, bronze medalist(s)	Adolf Spinnler (SUI)	Germany	67.99
4	Ernst Mohr	Germany	67.90
5	Otto Wiegand	Germany	67.82
6	Otto Steffen	United States	67.03
7	Hugo Peitsch	Germany	66.66
8	John Bissinger	United States	66.57
9	Christian Busch	Germany	66.12
10	William Merz	United States	65.26
11	Philip Kassel	United States	64.56
12	Theodore Gross	United States	64.39
13	Wilhelm Lemke	Germany	64.15
14	Otto Boehnke	United States	64.10
15	William Andelfinger	United States	63.53
16	George Stapf	United States	63.47
17	Charles Umbs	United States	63.19
18	Anton Heida	United States	62.72
19	Adolph Weber	Germany	62.62
20	Andreas Kempf	United States	62.57
21	George Mayer	United States	61.66
22	Fred Schmind	United States	61.40
23	Andrew Neu	United States	61.21
24	John Duha	United States	61.02
25	Reinhard Wagner	United States	60.73
26	Lorenz Spann	United States	60.32
27	Emil Rothe	United States	60.27
28	Ragnvald Berg	United States	60.24
29	Robert Herrmann	United States	59.99
30	Emil Beyer	United States	59.70
31	Max Hess	United States	59.29
32	Edward Siegler	United States	59.03
33	Harry Hansen	United States	59.00
34	Max Wolf	United States	57.85
35	Frank Ihrcke	United States	57.47
36	John Dellert	United States	57.41
37	Charles Sorum	United States	57.40
38	William Horschke	United States	57.33
39	Oliver Olsen	United States	57.27
40	Rudolf Krupitzer	United States	57.18
41	Gustav Mueller	United States	57.12
42	Emil Schwegler	United States	56.87
43	Henry Koeder	United States	56.58
44	Louis Kniep	United States	56.57
45	William Traband	United States	56.26
46	Leander Keim	United States	56.16
47	Ernst Reckeweg	United States	56.15
48	Charles Krause	United States	56.11
49	Jacob Hergenhahn	United States	55.77
50	Edward Hennig	United States	55.63
51	Philip Schuster	United States	55.44
52	John Grieb	United States	55.21
53	P. Gussmann	United States	54.92
54	Gustav Hämmerlin	United States	54.87
55	William Tritschler	United States	54.73
56	Christian Deubler	United States	54.63
57	Julian Schmitz	United States	54.58
58	Otto Niemand	United States	54.54
59	Robert Maysack	United States	54.53
60	Emil Voigt	United States	54.33
61	Anthony Jahnke	United States	53.94
62	Phillip Sontag	United States	53.83
63	Oluf Landnes	United States	53.64
64	George Aschenbrenner	United States	53.47
65	John Wolf	United States	53.43
66	Edward Tritschler	United States	53.16
67	Max Emmerich	United States	52.85
68	Harry Prinzler	United States	52.81
69	Frank Raab	United States	52.39
70	Leo Hunger	United States	52.22
71	George Eyser	United States	52.20
72	William Berewald	United States	51.87
73	George Mastrovich	United States	51.83
73	Martin Ludwig	United States	51.83
75	Max Rascher	United States	51.53
76	Henry Kraft	United States	51.40
77	Willard Schrader	United States	51.22
78	James Dwyer	United States	51.00
79	George Schroeder	United States	50.90
80	Bob Reynolds	United States	50.74
81	Harry Warnken	United States	50.53
82	Birger Nilsen	United States	50.45
83	John Laichinger	United States	50.00
84	Rudolf Schrader	United States	49.64
85	Michael Lang	United States	49.44
86	Charles Dellert	United States	49.35
87	Alvin Kritschmann	United States	48.97
88	Richard Tritschler	United States	48.80
89	Arthur Rosenkampff	United States	48.34
90	Clarence Lidington	United States	48.30
91	Henry Weyland	United States	47.94
92	Ben Chimberoff	United States	47.93
93	K. Woerner	United States	47.67
94	Curt Roedel	United States	47.63
95	Maurice Barry	United States	47.43
96	P. Ritter	United States	47.09
97	Otto Feyder	United States	47.05
98	Bernard Berg	United States	46.73
99	Max Thomas	United States	45.85
100	Martin Fischer	United States	45.35
101	Charles Schwartz	United States	45.34
102	Wilhelm Zabel	United States	45.13
103	Louis Rathke	United States	44.93
104	L. Guerner	United States	44.90
105	William Herzog	United States	44.60
106	August Placke	United States	44.41
106	Otto Roesner	United States	44.41
108	Paul Stendel	United States	43.38
109	Arthur Sundbye	United States	43.21
110	Christian Sperl	United States	42.66
111	William Kruppinger	United States	42.50
112	John Wussow	United States	42.46
113	Walter Real	United States	42.44
114	John Miesel	United States	41.97
115	Otto Thomsen	United States	41.67
116	Edmund Pueschel	United States	40.36
117	Otto Knerr	United States	39.87
118	William Friedrich	United States	39.57
119	Ted Studier	United States	13.14

== Sources ==
- Wudarski, Pawel (1999). "Wyniki Igrzysk Olimpijskich" (in Polish).
