= Gymnastics at the 1904 Summer Olympics – Men's triathlon =

Men's gymnastic triathlon at the Games of the III Olympiad
- Venue: Francis Field
- Dates: July 1–2, 1904
- Competitors: 119 from 3 nations

Medalists
1st place, gold medalist(s)		Adolf Spinnler	Germany
2nd place, silver medalist(s)		Julius Lenhart	United States
3rd place, bronze medalist(s)		Wilhelm Weber	Germany

The men's triathlon was an artistic gymnastics event held as part of the gymnastics programme at the 1904 Summer Olympics. It was the only time the event was held at the Olympics. The competition was held on Friday, July 1, 1904, and on Saturday, July 2, 1904. One hundred and nineteen gymnasts from three nations competed.

The three apparatus used were the horizontal bar, the parallel bars, and the horse (itself actually split further between the "long horse" or vault and the "side horse" or pommel horse). Each gymnast performed two compulsory routines and one optional routine on each apparatus, with the compulsory routines split between the two versions of the horse and the optional horse routine being on the side horse. The maximum score in each routine was 5, for a total maximum of 45.

Scores from this event, as well as the athletics triathlon event, were used to determine final scoring in the gymnastic all-around event.

The medals won by Austrian Julius Lenhart and Swiss Adolf Spinnler are attributed by the International Olympic Committee (IOC) according to the national affiliation of the club or team they represented, rather than their nationality. (Note: In 2024, the IOC reinstated its original and current attribution policy for athletes at the early Olympic Games (1896, 1900, and 1904). From 2021 to 2024, the IOC briefly attributed medals in individual events according to the athlete's nationality, even when the athlete represented a foreign club/team. Since 2024, participation and medals have instead been attributed according to the national affiliation of the club/team represented by the athlete.) As Lenhart represented an American club and Spinnler a German club, their results are attributed to the United States and Germany, respectively.

== Results ==
Final
1	Adolf Spinnler (GER)	43.39
2	Julius Lenhart (USA)	43.00
3	Wilhelm Weber (GER)	41.60
4	Hugo Peitsch (GER)	41.56
5	Otto Wiegand (GER)	40.82
6	Otto Steffen (USA)	39.53
7	William Andelfinger (USA)	39.03
8	Andreas Kempf (USA)	38.97
9	Ernst Mohr (GER)	38.90
10	George Eyser (USA)	38.70
11	Wilhelm Lemke (GER)	37.75
12	Anton Heida (USA)	37.72
13	Christian Busch (GER)	37.62
14	John Bissinger (USA)	37.57
15	Charles Umbs (USA)	37.49
16	Theodore Gross (USA)	37.19
17	Adolph Weber (GER)	36.72
18	Otto Boehnke (USA)	36.50
19	Philip Kassel (USA)	35.66
20	William Horschke (USA)	35.63
21	Emil Schwegler (USA)	35.57
22	John Duha (USA)	35.32
23	George Stapf (USA)	35.27
24	William Merz (USA)	35.26
25	Gustav Mueller (USA)	35.12
26	Emil Rothe (USA)	34.87
27	Harry Hansen (USA)	34.20
28	Gustav Hämmerlin (USA)	33.97
29	Reinhard Wagner (USA)	33.73
30	John Dellert (USA)	33.71
31	Charles Sorum (USA)	33.40
32	Julian Schmitz (USA)	33.38
33	Max Wolf (USA)	33.25
34	Emil Beyer (USA)	33.20
35	Robert Herrmann (USA)	32.99
36	Lorenz Spann (USA)	32.92
37	Fred Schmind (USA)	32.90
38	Ragnar Berg (USA)	32.85
39	George Mayer (USA)	32.66
40	Andrew Neu (USA)	32.61
41	William Traband (USA)	31.96
42	Emil Voigt (USA)	31.93
43	P. Gussmann (USA)	31.82
44	Rudolf Krupitzer (USA)	31.68
45	Charles Krause (USA)	31.61
46	Martin Ludwig (USA)	31.43
47	Christian Deubler (USA)	31.13
48	Frank Raab (USA)	30.89
49	Oliver Olsen (USA)	30.87
50	Max Hess (USA)	30.79
51	Jacob Hertenbahn (USA)	30.77
52	Louis Kniep (USA)	30.67
53	Edward Siegler (USA)	30.63
54	Philip Schuster (USA)	30.34
55	Robert Maysack (USA)	30.33
56	Max Rascher (USA)	30.13
57	Alvin Kritschmann (USA)	30.07
58	Henry Koeder (USA)	29.98
59	Edward Hennig (USA)	29.93
60	Leander Keim (USA)	29.76
61	William Tritschler (USA)	29.73
62	Edward Tritschler (USA)	29.66
63	Frank Schicke (USA)	29.07
64	Charles Dellert (USA)	29.05
65	Henry Kraft (USA)	28.70
66	Curt Roedel (USA)	28.63
67	Ernst Reckeweg (USA)	28.35
68	Rudolf Schrader (USA)	28.34
69	George Aschenbrener (USA)	27.97
69	K. Woerner (USA)	27.97
71	George Mastrovich (USA)	27.73
71	John Wolf (USA)	27.73
73.	Phillip Sontag (USA)	27.63
74.	Anthony Jahnke (USA)	27.54
75	M. Barry (USA)	27.33
76	Arthur Rosenkampff (USA)	27.24
77	James Dwyer (USA)	26.70
78	Michael Lang (USA)	26.44
78	Oluf Landnes (USA)	26.44
80	Henry Prinzler (USA)	26.41
81.	Richard Tritschler (USA)	26.40
82	Louis Hunger (USA)	26.32
83	Charles Schwartz (USA)	26.24
84	Otto Neimand (USA)	26.14
85	Bergin Nilsen (USA)	26.05
86	Hy. Meyland (USA)	25.54
87	George Schroeder (USA)	25.50
88	Harry Warnken (USA)	25.43
89	William Berewald (USA)	25.27
90	John Grieb (USA)	25.21
91	Willard Schrader (USA)	24.72
92	Ben Chimberoff (USA)	24.53
93	P. Ritter (USA)	24.29
94	Martin Fischer (USA)	24.15
95	Wilhelm Zabel (USA)	23.63
96	William Herzog (USA)	23.50
97	Bernard Berg (USA)	23.33
98	August Placke (USA)	23.11
99	Arthur Sundbye (USA)	23.01
100	Max Emmerich (USA)	22.85
101	Paul Studel (USA)	22.48
102	Robert Reynolds (USA)	22.44
103	John Leichinger (USA)	22.30
104	Walter Real (USA)	22.24
105	Otto Roissner (USA)	21.90
106	William Friedrich (USA)	21.87
107	Otto Feyder (USA)	21.85
108	Clarence Kiddington (USA)	21.80
109	John Messel (USA)	21.77
110	L. Guerner (USA)	21.70
111	Christian Sperl (USA)	21.36
112	William Kruppinger (USA)	21.20
113	Edward Pueschell (USA)	21.06
114	Louis Rathke (USA)	19.83
115	Otto Knerr (USA)	19.47
116	Max Thomas (USA)	19.45
117	Otto Thomsen (USA)	18.07
118	J. Wassow (USA)	16.96
119	Theodore Studler (USA)	13.14

== Sources ==
- Wudarski, Pawel (1999). "Wyniki Igrzysk Olimpijskich" (in Polish).
