= Gymnastics at the 1904 Summer Olympics – Men's team =

Men's team gymnastics at the Games of the III Olympiad
- Venue: Francis Field
- Dates: July 1–2, 1904
- Competitors: 78 from 2 nations

Medalists
1st place, gold medalist(s)		Philadelphia Turngemeinde; United States
2nd place, silver medalist(s)		New York Turnverein; United States
3rd place, bronze medalist(s)		Central Turnverein, Chicago; United States

The men's team was an artistic gymnastics event held as part of the Gymnastics at the 1904 Summer Olympics programme. It was the first time a team event, in the sense of combining scores of individual gymnasts, was held at the Olympics. Previous team events had been performances by large groups of gymnasts at a single time. The competition was held on Friday, July 1, 1904 and on Saturday, July 2, 1904.

There were 13 teams entered in this all-around team event, with gymnasts from three nations, although all teams were from American turnvereins (gymnastics clubs). The teams represented 10 American cities, including two teams from St. Louis and three from Chicago. Each team consisted of six gymnasts, with their scores from the individual all-around event, with adjustments made due to predetermined maximum scores for each discipline. The gold medal was won by the Philadelphia Turngemeinde, led by Austrian gymnast Julius Lenhart, who had also won the individual all-around competition. Lenhart had only lived in Philadelphia for a few years before returning to Austria. Germany also attempted to enter a team, but its entry was rejected because the German gymnasts were not members of the same club.

== Results ==
Place	Gymnast	Score
1
1	United States; Philadelphia Turngemeinde	370.13
1	John Grieb	
1	Anton Heida	
1	Max Hess	
1	Philip Kassel	
1	Julius Lenhart (AUT)	
1	Ernst Reckeweg	
–
–	John Wolf	
–	William Traband	
2
2	United States; New York Turnverein	356.37
2	Otto Steffen	
2	John Bissinger	
2	Emil Beyer	
2	Max Wolf	
2	Julian Schmitz	
2	Arthur Rosenkampff	
3
3	United States; Central Turnverein	352.79
3	George Mayer	
3	John Duha	
3	Edward Siegler	
3	Charles Krause	
3	Philip Schuster	
3	Robert Maysack	
–
–	Fred Schmind	
–	Anthony Jahnke	
–	Gustav Mueller	
4
4	United States; Concordia Turnverein	344.01
4	William Merz	
4	George Stapf	
4	John Dellert	
4	Emil Voigt	
4	George Eyser	
4	Hy. Meyland	
–
–	Charles Dellert	
5
5	United States; South St. Louis Turnverein	338.32
5	Charles Umbs	
5	Andrew Neu	
5	William Tritschler	
5	Christian Deubler	
5	Edward Tritschler	
5	John Leichinger	
–
–	Max Thomas	
–	Richard Tritschler	
–	William Kruppinger	
6
6	United States; Norwegier Turnverein	338.00
6	Ragnar Berg	
6	Harry Hansen	
6	Charles Sorum	
6	Oliver Olsen	
6	Oluf Landnes	
6	Bergin Nilsen	
–
–	Arthur Sundbye	
7
7	United States; Turnverein Vorwärts (Chicago)	329.68
7	Theodore Gross	
7	Henry Koeder	
7	Jacob Hertenbahn	
7	Henry Kraft	
7	James Dwyer	
7	Rudolf Scharder	
–
–	Willard Schrader	
–	Ben Chimberoff	
–	William Herzog	
8
8	United States; Davenport Turngemeinde	325.52
8	Reinhard Wagner	
8	Leander Keim	
8	Otto Neimand	
8	Phillip Sontag	
8	Harry Warnken	
8	Bernard Berg	
–
–	Otto Thomsen	
9
9	United States; La Salle Turnverein	318.13
9	Emil Rothe	
9	Frank Schicke	
9	William Horschke	
9	George Aschenbrener	
9	Otto Feyder	
9	Walter Real	
10
10	United States; Passaic Turnverein	301.39
10	P. Gussmann	
10	Gustav Hämmerlin	
10	Max Rascher	
10	Curt Roedel	
10	P. Ritter	
10	Martin Fischer	
–
–	K. Woerner	
11
11	United States; Milwaukee Turnverein	286.97
11	Robert Herrmann	
11	Louis Hunger	
11	Louis Rathke	
11	August Placke	
11	Christian Sperl	
11	J. Wassow	
–
–	L. Guerner	
12
12	United States; Socialer Turnverein	273.65
12	Robert Reynolds	
12	Alvin Kritschmann	
12	Clarence Kiddington	
12	Otto Roissner	
12	John Messel	
12	William Friedrich	
13
13	United States; Turnverein Vorwärts (Cleveland)	271.84
13	Rudolf Krupitzer	
13	Edward Hennig	
13	William Berewald	
13	Michael Lang	
13	Paul Studel	
13	Theodore Studler	

The following clubs did not compete as a team, as they did not enter with at least six gymnasts.

Place	Gymnast	Score
–
–	United States; Socialer Turnverein, Indianapolis	–
–	Max Emmerich	
–	Henry Prinzler	
–	M. Barry	
–
–	United States; Vorwärts Turnverein, Brooklyn	–
–	Otto Boehnke	
–
–	United States; Newark Turnverein	–
–	Lorenz Spann	
–	Louis Kniep	
–	Charles Schwartz	
–
–	United States; Kansas City Turnverein	–
–	George Schroeder	
–	Andreas Kempf	
–	Otto Knerr	
–	Edward Pueschell	
–
–	United States; Turnverein Germania, Los Angeles	–
–	William Andelfinger	
–	Wilhelm Zabel	
–
–	United States; Vorwärts Turnverein, Brooklyn	–
–	George Mastrovich	
–
–	United States; Johnstown Turnverein, Johnstown PA	–
–	Frank Raad	
–
–	United States; St. Louis Schweizer Turnverein	–
–	Emil Schwegler	
–
–	United States; Labor Lycaeum, Baltimore	–
–	Martin Ludwig	

== Sources ==
- De Wael, Herman (2000). "Herman's Full Olympians".
- Wudarski, Pawel (1999). "Wyniki Igrzysk Olimpijskich" (in Polish).
