= Individual all-around artistic gymnastics at the Olympics =

Olympic sport

Artistic individual all-around at the Olympic Games
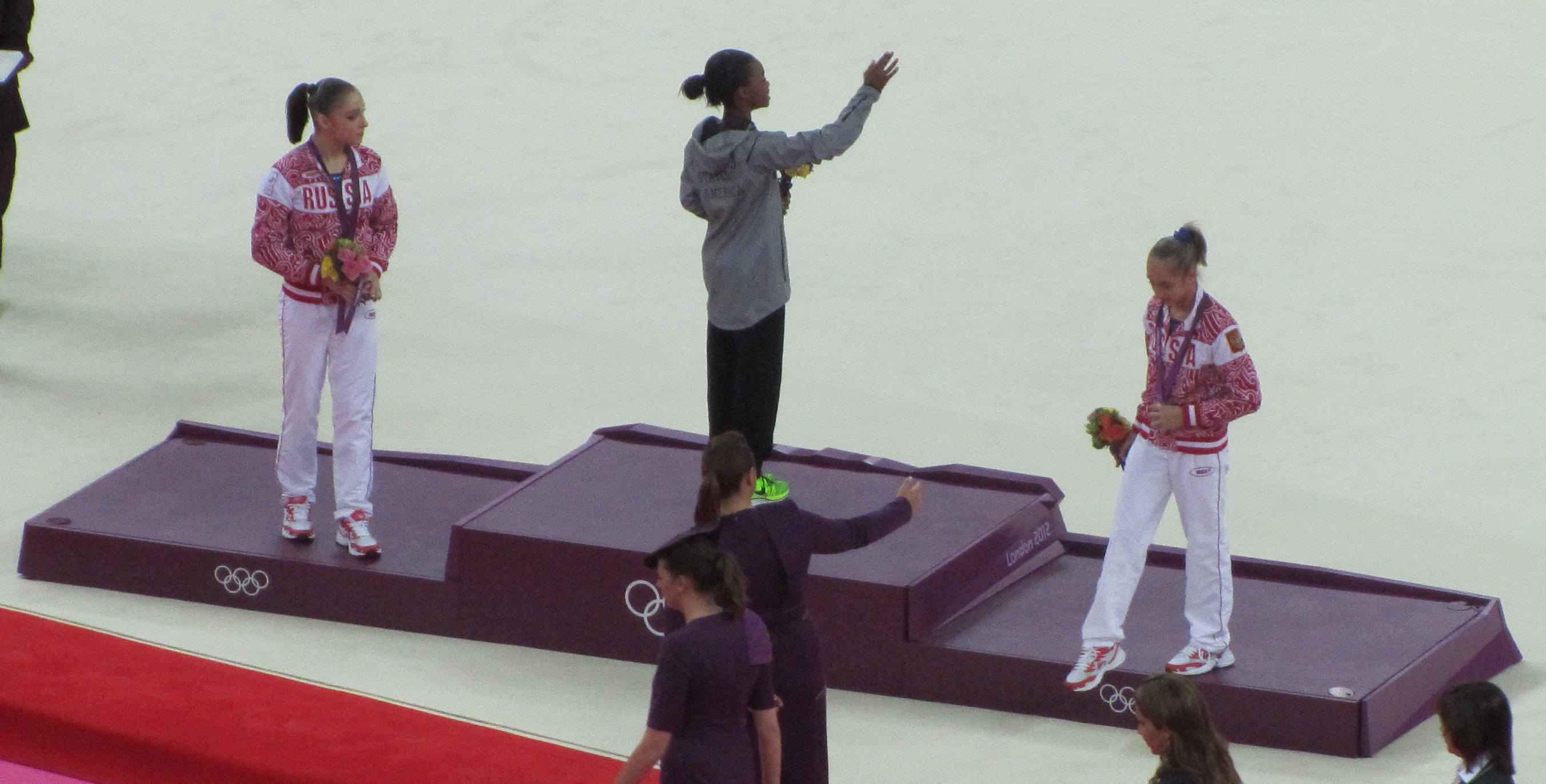
- Women's all-around podium at the 2012 Olympic Games

Overview
- Sport: Artistic gymnastics
- Gender: Men and women
- Years held: Men: 1900–2024; Women: 1952–2024

Reigning champion
- Men: Shinnosuke Oka (JPN)
- Women: Simone Biles (USA)

The individual all-around is an artistic gymnastics event held at the Summer Olympics. The event was first held for men at the second modern Olympics in 1900, and has been held every Games since. The women's competition was added in 1952.

== Medalists ==
=== Men ===
Games	Gold	Silver	Bronze
1900 Paris	Gustave Sandras; France	Noël Bas; France	Lucien Démanet; France
1904 St. Louis	Julius Lenhart; United States (Note: Despite being Austrian, Lenhart's medals are attributed to the United States due to him representing an American club, Philadelphia Turngemeinde, at the 1904 Summer Olympics)	Wilhelm Weber; Germany	Adolf Spinnler; Switzerland
1908 London	Alberto Braglia; Italy	Walter Tysall; Great Britain	Louis Ségura; France
1912 Stockholm	Alberto Braglia; Italy	Louis Ségura; France	Adolfo Tunesi; Italy
1920 Antwerp	Giorgio Zampori; Italy	Marco Torrès; France	Jean Gounot; France
1924 Paris	Leon Štukelj; Slovenia	Robert Pražák; Czechoslovakia	Bedřich Šupčík; Czechoslovakia
1928 Amsterdam	Georges Miez; Switzerland	Hermann Hänggi; Switzerland	Leon Štukelj; Slovenia
1932 Los Angeles	Romeo Neri; Italy	István Pelle; Hungary	Heikki Savolainen; Finland
1936 Berlin	Alfred Schwarzmann; Germany	Eugen Mack; Switzerland	Konrad Frey; Germany
1948 London	Veikko Huhtanen; Finland	Walter Lehmann; Switzerland	Paavo Aaltonen; Finland
1952 Helsinki	Viktor Chukarin; Soviet Union	Hrant Shahinyan; Soviet Union	Josef Stalder; Switzerland
1956 Melbourne	Viktor Chukarin; Soviet Union	Takashi Ono; Japan	Yuri Titov; Soviet Union
1960 Rome	Boris Shakhlin; Soviet Union	Takashi Ono; Japan	Yuri Titov; Soviet Union
1964 Tokyo	Yukio Endo; Japan	Viktor Lisitsky; Soviet Union Boris Shakhlin; Soviet Union Shuji Tsurumi; Japan	Not awarded
1968 Mexico City	Sawao Kato; Japan	Mikhail Voronin; Soviet Union	Akinori Nakayama; Japan
1972 Munich	Sawao Kato; Japan	Eizo Kenmotsu; Japan	Akinori Nakayama; Japan
1976 Montreal	Nikolai Andrianov; Soviet Union	Sawao Kato; Japan	Mitsuo Tsukahara; Japan
1980 Moscow	Alexander Dityatin; Soviet Union	Nikolai Andrianov; Soviet Union	Stoyan Deltchev; Bulgaria
1984 Los Angeles	Koji Gushiken; Japan	Peter Vidmar; United States	Li Ning; China
1988 Seoul	Vladimir Artemov; Soviet Union	Valeri Liukin; Soviet Union	Dmitri Bilozertchev; Soviet Union
1992 Barcelona	Vitaly Scherbo; Unified Team	Grigory Misutin; Unified Team	Valery Belenky; Unified Team
1996 Atlanta	Li Xiaoshuang; China	Alexei Nemov; Russia	Vitaly Scherbo; Belarus
2000 Sydney	Alexei Nemov; Russia	Yang Wei; China	Oleksandr Beresch; Ukraine
2004 Athens	Paul Hamm; United States	Kim Dae-Eun; South Korea	Yang Tae Young; South Korea
2008 Beijing	Yang Wei; China	Kōhei Uchimura; Japan	Benoît Caranobe; France
2012 London	Kōhei Uchimura; Japan	Marcel Nguyen; Germany	Danell Leyva; United States
2016 Rio de Janeiro	Kohei Uchimura; Japan	Oleg Verniaiev; Ukraine	Max Whitlock; Great Britain
2020 Tokyo	Daiki Hashimoto; Japan	Xiao Ruoteng; China	Nikita Nagornyy; ROC
2024 Paris	Shinnosuke Oka; Japan	Zhang Boheng; China	Xiao Ruoteng; China

==== Multiple medalists ====
Rank	Gymnast	Nation	Olympics	Gold	Silver	Bronze	Total
1	Sawao Kato	Japan	1968–1976	2	1	0	3
1	Kōhei Uchimura	Japan	2008–2016	2	1	0	3
3	Alberto Braglia	Italy	1908–1912	2	0	0	2
3	Viktor Chukarin	Soviet Union	1952–1956	2	0	0	2
5	Boris Shakhlin	Soviet Union	1960–1964	1	1	0	2
5	Nikolai Andrianov	Soviet Union	1976–1980	1	1	0	2
5	Alexei Nemov	Russia	1996–2000	1	1	0	2
5	Yang Wei	China	2000, 2008	1	1	0	2
9	Leon Štukelj	Slovenia	1924–1928	1	0	1	2
9	Vitaly Scherbo	Unified Team; Belarus	1992–1996	1	0	1	2
11	Takashi Ono	Japan	1956–1960	0	2	0	2
12	Louis Ségura	France	1908–1912	0	1	1	2
12	Xiao Ruoteng	China	2020–2024	0	1	1	2
14	Yuri Titov	Soviet Union	1956–1960	0	0	2	2
14	Akinori Nakayama	Japan	1968–1972	0	0	2	2

==== Medalists by country ====
Rank	Nation	Gold	Silver	Bronze	Total
1	Japan	8	6	3	17
2	Soviet Union	6	6	3	15
3	Italy	4	0	1	5
4	China	2	3	2	7
5	United States	2	1	1	4
6	France	1	3	4	8
7	Switzerland	1	3	2	6
8	Germany	1	2	1	4
9	Unified Team	1	1	1	3
10	Russia	1	1	0	2
11	Finland	1	0	2	3
12	Slovenia	1	0	1	2
13	Great Britain	0	1	1	2
13	South Korea	0	1	1	2
13	Czechoslovakia	0	1	1	2
13	Ukraine	0	1	1	2
17	Hungary	0	1	0	1
18	Belarus	0	0	1	1
18	Bulgaria	0	0	1	1
18	ROC	0	0	1	1

=== Women ===
Games	Gold	Silver	Bronze
1952 Helsinki	Maria Gorokhovskaya; Soviet Union	Nina Bocharova; Soviet Union	Margit Korondi; Hungary
1956 Melbourne	Larisa Latynina; Soviet Union	Ágnes Keleti; Hungary	Sofia Muratova; Soviet Union
1960 Rome	Larisa Latynina; Soviet Union	Sofia Muratova; Soviet Union	Polina Astakhova; Soviet Union
1964 Tokyo	Věra Čáslavská; Czechoslovakia	Larisa Latynina; Soviet Union	Polina Astakhova; Soviet Union
1968 Mexico City	Věra Čáslavská; Czechoslovakia	Zinaida Voronina; Soviet Union	Natalia Kuchinskaya; Soviet Union
1972 Munich	Ludmilla Tourischeva; Soviet Union	Karin Janz; East Germany	Tamara Lazakovich; Soviet Union
1976 Montreal	Nadia Comăneci; Romania	Nellie Kim; Soviet Union	Ludmilla Tourischeva; Soviet Union
1980 Moscow	Elena Davydova; Soviet Union	Nadia Comăneci; Romania Maxi Gnauck; East Germany	Not awarded
1984 Los Angeles	Mary Lou Retton; United States	Ecaterina Szabo; Romania	Simona Păucă; Romania
1988 Seoul	Yelena Shushunova; Soviet Union	Daniela Silivaş; Romania	Svetlana Boginskaya; Soviet Union
1992 Barcelona	Tatiana Gutsu; Unified Team	Shannon Miller; United States	Lavinia Miloșovici; Romania
1996 Atlanta	Lilia Podkopayeva; Ukraine	Gina Gogean; Romania	Simona Amânar; Romania Lavinia Miloșovici; Romania
2000 Sydney	Simona Amânar; Romania	Maria Olaru; Romania	Liu Xuan; China
2004 Athens	Carly Patterson; United States	Svetlana Khorkina; Russia	Zhang Nan; China
2008 Beijing	Nastia Liukin; United States	Shawn Johnson; United States	Yang Yilin; China
2012 London	Gabby Douglas; United States	Viktoria Komova; Russia	Aliya Mustafina; Russia
2016 Rio de Janeiro	Simone Biles; United States	Aly Raisman; United States	Aliya Mustafina; Russia
2020 Tokyo	Sunisa Lee; United States	Rebeca Andrade; Brazil	Angelina Melnikova; ROC
2024 Paris	Simone Biles; United States	Rebeca Andrade; Brazil	Sunisa Lee; United States

==== Multiple medalists ====
Rank	Gymnast	Nation	Olympics	Gold	Silver	Bronze	Total
1	Larisa Latynina	Soviet Union	1956–1964	2	1	0	3
2	Simone Biles	United States	2016, 2024	2	0	0	2
2	Věra Čáslavská	Czechoslovakia	1964–1968	2	0	0	2
4	Nadia Comăneci	Romania	1976–1980	1	1	0	2
5	Simona Amânar	Romania	1996–2000	1	0	1	2
5	Sunisa Lee	United States	2020–2024	1	0	1	2
5	Ludmilla Tourischeva	Soviet Union	1972–1976	1	0	1	2
8	Rebeca Andrade	Brazil	2020–2024	0	2	0	2
9	Sofia Muratova	Soviet Union	1956–1960	0	1	1	2
10	Polina Astakhova	Soviet Union	1960–1964	0	0	2	2
10	Lavinia Miloșovici	Romania	1992–1996	0	0	2	2
10	Aliya Mustafina	Russia	2012–2016	0	0	2	2

==== Medalists by country ====
Rank	Nation	Gold	Silver	Bronze	Total
1	United States	7	3	1	11
2	Soviet Union	6	5	7	18
3	Romania	2	5	4	11
4	Czechoslovakia	2	0	0	2
5	Ukraine	1	0	0	1
5	Unified Team	1	0	0	1
7	Russia	0	2	2	4
8	Brazil	0	2	0	2
8	East Germany	0	2	0	2
10	Hungary	0	1	1	2
11	China	0	0	3	3
12	ROC	0	0	1	1
