= Germany at the 1904 Summer Olympics =

- Flag of the German Empire
- IOC code: GER
- NOC: German Imperial Commission for the Olympic Games

in St. Louis
- Competitors: 18 in 6 sports
- Medals Ranked 2nd: Gold 5 Silver 4 Bronze 5 Total 14

Summer Olympics appearances (overview)
- 1896; 1900; 1904; 1908; 1912; 1920–1924; 1928; 1932; 1936; 1948; 1952; 1956–1988; 1992; 1996; 2000; 2004; 2008; 2012; 2016; 2020; 2024

Other related appearances
- 1906 Intercalated Games –––– Saar (1952); United Team of Germany (1956–1964); East Germany (1968–1988); West Germany (1968–1988)

Germany competed at the 1904 Summer Olympics in St. Louis, United States.

Although most of the athletes in the 1904 Olympics were American, Germany sent 7 gymnasts to compete in the games in St. Louis, Missouri.

== Medalists ==
| Medal | Name | Sport | Event | Date |
|---|---|---|---|---|
| Gold | Adolf Spinnler | Gymnastics | Men's triathlon | July 2 |
| Gold | Emil Rausch | Swimming | Men's 880 yd freestyle | September 7 |
| Gold | Emil Rausch | Swimming | Men's 1 mile freestyle | September 6 |
| Gold | Walter Brack | Swimming | Men's 100 yd backstroke | September 6 |
| Gold | Georg Zacharias | Swimming | Men's 440 yd breaststroke | September 7 |
| Silver | Georg Hoffmann | Diving | Platform | September 7 |
| Silver | Wilhelm Weber | Gymnastics | Men's all-around | July 2 |
| Silver | Georg Hoffmann | Swimming | Men's 100 yd backstroke | September 6 |
| Silver | Walter Brack | Swimming | Men's 440 yd breaststroke | September 7 |
| Bronze | Paul Weinstein | Athletics | Men's high jump | August 29 |
| Bronze | Adolf Spinnler | Gymnastics | Men's all-around | July 2 |
| Bronze | Wilhelm Weber | Gymnastics | Men's triathlon | July 2 |
| Bronze | Emil Rausch | Swimming | Men's 220 yd freestyle | September 6 |
| Bronze | Georg Zacharias | Swimming | Men's 100 yd backstroke | September 6 |

== Results by event ==
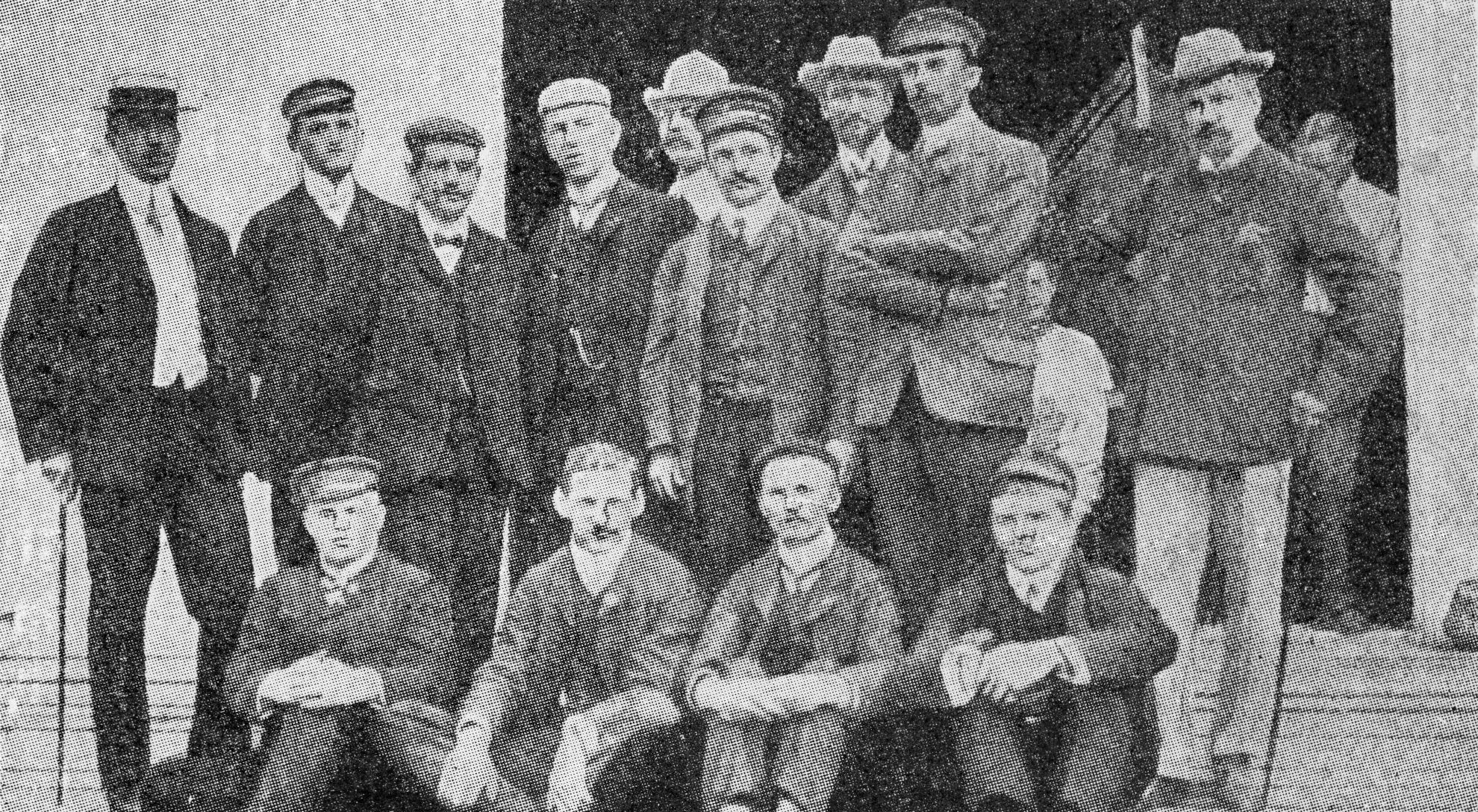
Members of the German team at the 1904 Summer Olympics

=== Athletics ===
| Event | Place | Athlete | Final |
|---|---|---|---|
| Men's 400 metres | 7-12 | Johannes Runge | Unknown |
| Men's 800 metres | 5th | Johannes Runge | Unknown |
| Men's 1500 metres | 5th | Johannes Runge | Unknown |
| Men's high jump | 3rd | Paul Weinstein | 1.77 metres |
| Men's pole vault | 7th | Paul Weinstein | 1.77 metres |

| Event | Place | Athlete | Total score |
|---|---|---|---|
| Men's triathlon | 7th | Christian Busch | 30.0 |
| Men's triathlon | 9th | Ernst Mohr | 29.7 |
| Men's triathlon | 21st | Wilhelm Weber | 27.6 |
| Men's triathlon | 28th | Otto Weigand | 27.2 |
| Men's triathlon | 34th | Wilhelm Lemke | 26.6 |
| Men's triathlon | 44th | Adolph Weber | 25.9 |
| Men's triathlon | 55th | Hugo Peitsch | 25.1 |

=== Diving ===
The United States and Germany were the two nations that competed in diving. The three German divers took silver, (tied) bronze, and 5th place in the platform event.

| Event | Place | Diver | Final |
|---|---|---|---|
| Platform | 2nd | Georg Hoffmann | 11.66 points |
| Platform | 4th | Alfred Braunschweiger | 11.33 points |
| Platform | 5th | Otto Hooff | Unknown |

=== Fencing ===
| Event | Place | Fencer | Semifinal | Final |
|---|---|---|---|---|
| Men's foil | 4th | Gustav Casmir | 3-0; 1st, semifinal B | 0-3 |

| Event | Place | Fencer | Final |
|---|---|---|---|
| Men's épée | 4th | Gustav Casmir | Unknown |

=== Gymnastics ===
| Event | Place | Gymnast | Score |
|---|---|---|---|
| Men's all-around | 2nd | Wilhelm Weber | 69.10 |
| Men's all-around | 4th | Ernst Mohr | 67.90 |
| Men's all-around | 5th | Otto Wiegand | 67.82 |
| Men's all-around | 7th | Hugo Peitsch | 66.66 |
| Men's all-around | 9th | Christian Busch | 66.12 |
| Men's all-around | 13th | Wilhelm Lemke | 64.15 |
| Men's all-around | 19th | Adolph Weber | 62.62 |
| Men's triathlon | 3rd | Wilhelm Weber | 41.60 |
| Men's triathlon | 4th | Hugo Peitsch | 41.56 |
| Men's triathlon | 5th | Otto Wiegand | 40.82 |
| Men's triathlon | 9th | Ernst Mohr | 38.92 |
| Men's triathlon | 11th | Wilhelm Lemke | 37.75 |
| Men's triathlon | 13th | Christian Busch | 37.62 |
| Men's triathlon | 17th | Adolph Weber | 36.72 |

=== Swimming ===
| Event | Place | Swimmer | Final |
|---|---|---|---|
| 220 yd free | 3rd | Emil Rausch | 2:56.0 |
| 880 yd free | 1st | Emil Rausch | 13:11.4 |
| 1 mile free | 1st | Emil Rausch | 27:18.2 |
| 100 yd back | 1st | Walter Brack | 1:16.8 |
| 100 yd back | 2nd | Georg Hoffmann | Unknown |
| 100 yd back | 3rd | Georg Zacharias | Unknown |
| 440 yd breast | 1st | Georg Zacharias | 7:23.6 |
| 440 yd breast | 2nd | Walter Brack | Unknown |
| 440 yd breast | 4th | Georg Hoffmann | Unknown |

=== Tennis ===
Germany was the only nation other than the host to have a tennis player compete. Hugo Hardy had byes in the first two rounds of the singles tournament before meeting, and losing to, the eventual champion Beals Wright in the round of 16 (Hardy's first actual match). Hardy had little better luck in the draw of the doubles competition, facing in the first round a pair which had combined for the silver and a bronze medal in the singles and which would go on to win the silver in the doubles.

| Event | Place | Player | Round of 64 | Round of 32 | Round of 16 | Quarterfinals | Semifinals | Final |
|---|---|---|---|---|---|---|---|---|
| Men's singles | 9th | Hugo Hardy | Bye | Bye | Lost to Wright (USA) | Did not advance | | |

| Event | Place | Pair | Round of 16 | Quarterfinals | Semifinals | Final |
|---|---|---|---|---|---|---|
| Men's doubles | 9th | Hugo Hardy; Paul Gleeson (USA) | Lost to LeRoy & Bell (USA) | Did not advance | | |
