= Switzerland at the 1904 Summer Olympics =

- IOC code: SUI
- NOC: Swiss Olympic Association

in St. Louis
- Competitors: 2 (to 5) in 2 sports
- Medals: Gold 0 Silver 0 Bronze 0 Total 0

Summer Olympics appearances (overview)
- 1896; 1900; ~~1904~~; 1908; 1912; 1920; 1924; 1928; 1932; 1936; 1948; 1952; 1956; 1960; 1964; 1968; 1972; 1976; 1980; 1984; 1988; 1992; 1996; 2000; 2004; 2008; 2012; 2016; 2020; 2024; 2028

Other related appearances
- 1906 Intercalated Games

Switzerland did not send an official national team to the 1904 Summer Olympics in St. Louis, United States. However, many athletes with Swiss roots competed at the Olympics. Gymnast Adolf Spinnler and wrestler Gustav Thiefenthaler took part in the competitions while representing a German or American club, respectively. They bon won medals, which are attributed by the International Olympic Committee (IOC) according to the national affiliation of their club or team, rather than their nationality.

== Disputed country attribution ==
There were smome more athletes with Swiss roots at the Olympics: Andreas Kempf competed in three gymnastics events, finishing 8th in the combined three events finals. He arrived in the United States in 1902 and represented the Kansas City Turnverein. Kempf applied for naturalization as a US citizen in 1908, but was denied citizenship. Emil Schwegler competed for the United States in three gymnastics events, representing the St. Louis Schweizer Turnverein. Born in Switzerland, he was naturalized as a US citizen with his parents and then was a college student in Kansas City, Missouri. And Oscar Schwab was born in Paris to a Swiss mother and was adopted by her American husband. He competed for the US in the quarter mile cycling race. After the games he raced mostly in Europe and was Swiss sprint champion in 1907.

In fact, eighteen-year old Gustav Tiefenthaler was also born in Switzerland, moved to the United States with his family when he was a child and was naturalized as a US citizen with his parents. So he was "less Swiss" than Andreas Kempf. Tiefenthaler represented the South Broadway Athletic Club of St. Louis. At the Olympics, Tiefenthaler had a single bout in the men's freestyle light flyweight event and lose, but still earned a bronze medal. The IOC attributes his medals to the United States.

Adolf Spinnler on the other hand was clearly European, but he was born in Switzerland, later moved to Esslingen am Neckar in the German Empire and represented a German sports club - so his affiliation to a national team is also disputed. The IOC attributes his medals to Germany.

From 2021 to 2024, the IOC briefly attributed medals in individual events according to the athlete's nationality, even when the athlete represented a foreign club or team. Since 2024, participation and medals have instead been attributed according to the national affiliation of the club or team for which an athlete competed to be the decisive factor for the first three Olympic Games (1896–1904), attributing participation and medals accordingly.

== Reallocated medals ==
Medal	Name	Sport	Event	Date	Reallocated to
Gold	Adolf Spinnler	Gymnastics	Men's triathlon	July 2	Germany
Bronze	Adolf Spinnler	Gymnastics	Men's all-around	July 2	Germany
Bronze	Gustav Tiefenthaler	Wrestling	Men's freestyle light flyweight	July 2	United States

== Results by event ==
=== Athletics ===
Event	Place	Athlete	Total score
Men's triathlon	64th	Adolf Spinnler	24.5

=== Gymnastics ===
Event	Place	Gymnast	Score
Men's all-around	3rd	Adolf Spinnler	67.99
Men's triathlon	1st	Adolf Spinnler	43.39
