= Garrett Serviss =

Garrett Serviss is the name of:

- Garrett P. Serviss (1851–1929), astronomer and early science fiction writer
- Garrett Serviss (athlete) (1881–1907), American high jumper, son of Garrett P. Serviss
