= Georg Hoffmann =

German swimmer

Personal information
- Born: 1880 Berlin, German Empire
- Died: 1947 (aged 66–67)

Sport
- Sport: Swimming
Medal record
Representing Germany
Men's swimming
Olympic Games
| Silver medal – second place | 1904 St. Louis | 100 yard backstroke |
Men's diving
Olympic Games
| Silver medal – second place | 1904 St. Louis | Platform |
Intercalated Games
| Silver medal – second place | 1906 Athens | 10 metre platform |

Georg Hoffmann (1880–1947) was a German freestyle, backstroke, breaststroke swimmer and diver who competed in the 1904 Summer Olympics and 1906 Intercalated Games.

Hoffmann competed in three events at the 1904 Summer Olympics in St. Louis, in the 100 yard backstroke there was only six swimmers and he finished in second place to win a silver medal behind fellow German Walter Brack, the next day he competed with three other swimmers in the 440 yard breaststroke and unfortunately came in last place. Hoffmann also competed in the controversial platform diving event, where he came second behind American George Sheldon but only after protesting claiming the German dives where more fancy than the Americans, and it was a week later until it was decided that the original result stood.

Two years later he was back on the Olympic scene competing at the 1906 Intercalated Games in Athens, he again competed in the platform diving event, and again he finished second this time behind another German, Gottlob Walz, he also competed in the 100 metres freestyle swimming event, but didn't come in the top five in his heat so didn't qualify for the final.
