= Gymnastics at the 1904 Summer Olympics =

Gymnastics at the Games of the III Olympiad
- Gymnastics pictogram
- Venue: Francis Field
- Dates: July – October 1904
- No. of events: 11
- Competitors: 119 from 3 nations

At the 1904 Summer Olympics of St. Louis, Missouri, eleven gymnastics events were contested for the first time.

The 1904 Games had a program of events spread out over several months, and the gymnastics competition was no different. The International Olympic Committee (IOC) considers two sets of events as "Olympic":

- International Turners' Championship (the "All-Around") held July 1–2, comprising the all-around, triathlon, and team events
- Olympic Gymnastics Championships (the "Combined") held October 29, comprising the seven individual apparatus events and the combined event.

== Combination of gymnastics and athletics ==
The individual all-around (apparatus work and field sports) combined the results of the gymnastics triathlon and the athletics triathlon.

The team all-around result was based on the results of the individual all-around competition. This consisted of twelve events, the scores of which were added together. The nine gymnastic exercises were added together to produce the combined score. It included two compulsory and one optional exercise each on the parallel bars, horizontal bar, vault, and pommel horse. Three track and field events were also included: long jump, shot put, and a 100-yard dash (91.44m).

Since 2021, the IOC has listed the medals from the athletics triathlon as part of artistic gymnastics under the designation "Individual All-Around, Field Sports Men".

== Medal summary ==
- Does not include the results of the athletics triathlon event, as this classification reflects a later IOC attribution rather than the event's historical sporting classification.

Games	Gold	Silver	Bronze
All-around	Julius Lenhart (AUT) (Note: In 2024, the IOC reinstated its original and current attribution policy for athletes at the early Olympic Games (1896, 1900, and 1904). From 2021 to 2024, the IOC briefly attributed medals in individual events according to the athlete's nationality, even when the athlete represented a foreign club or team. Since 2024, participation and medals have instead been attributed according to the national affiliation of the club/team represented by the athlete.); United States	Wilhelm Weber; Germany	Adolf Spinnler (SUI); Germany
Combined	Anton Heida; United States	George Eyser; United States	William Merz; United States
Triathlon	Adolf Spinnler (SUI); Germany	Julius Lenhart (AUT); United States	Wilhelm Weber; Germany
Team	United States; Philadelphia Turngemeinde; John Grieb; Anton Heida; Max Hess; Philip Kassel; Julius Lenhart (AUT); Ernst Reckeweg	United States; New York Turnverein; Emil Beyer; John Bissinger; Arthur Rosenkampff; Julian Schmitz; Otto Steffen; Max Wolf	United States; Central Turnverein, Chicago; John Duha; Charles Krause; George Mayer; Robert Maysack; Philip Schuster; Edward Siegler
Club swinging	Edward Hennig; United States	Emil Voigt; United States	Ralph Wilson; United States
Horizontal bar	Anton Heida; United States; Edward Hennig; United States	none awarded	George Eyser; United States
Parallel bars	George Eyser; United States	Anton Heida; United States	John Duha; United States
Pommel horse	Anton Heida; United States	George Eyser; United States	William Merz; United States
Rings	Herman Glass; United States	William Merz; United States	Emil Voigt; United States
Rope climbing	George Eyser; United States	Charles Krause; United States	Emil Voigt; United States
Vault	George Eyser; United States; Anton Heida; United States	none awarded	William Merz; United States

== Participating nations ==
119 gymnasts from 4 nations competed.

- Austria (1)
- Germany (7)
- Switzerland (1)
- United States (110)

== Medal table ==
The medals won by Julius Lenhart (AUT) and Adolf Spinnler (SUI) are attributed by the International Olympic Committee (IOC) according to the national affiliation of the club or team they represented, rather than their nationality. As Lenhart represented an American club and Spinnler a German club, their results are attributed to the United States and Germany, respectively.

Rank	Nation	Gold	Silver	Bronze	Total
1	United States	12	8	9	29
2	Germany	1	1	2	4
Totals (2 entries)		13	9	11	33
