= Paul Weinstein (athlete) =

German high jumper

Olympic medal record

Men's athletics

Representing Germany
| Bronze medal – third place | 1904 St. Louis | High jump |

Paul Weinstein (5 April 1878 – 16 August 1964) was a German athlete who competed in the early twentieth century. He was born in Wallendorf.

Weinstein won the bronze medal in Athletics at the 1904 Summer Olympics in the high jump. Samuel Jones won the gold medal and Garrett Serviss won silver. Weinstein also competed in the pole vault event and finished seventh.
