= Diving at the 1904 Summer Olympics – Platform =

Men's platform diving at the Games of the III Olympiad
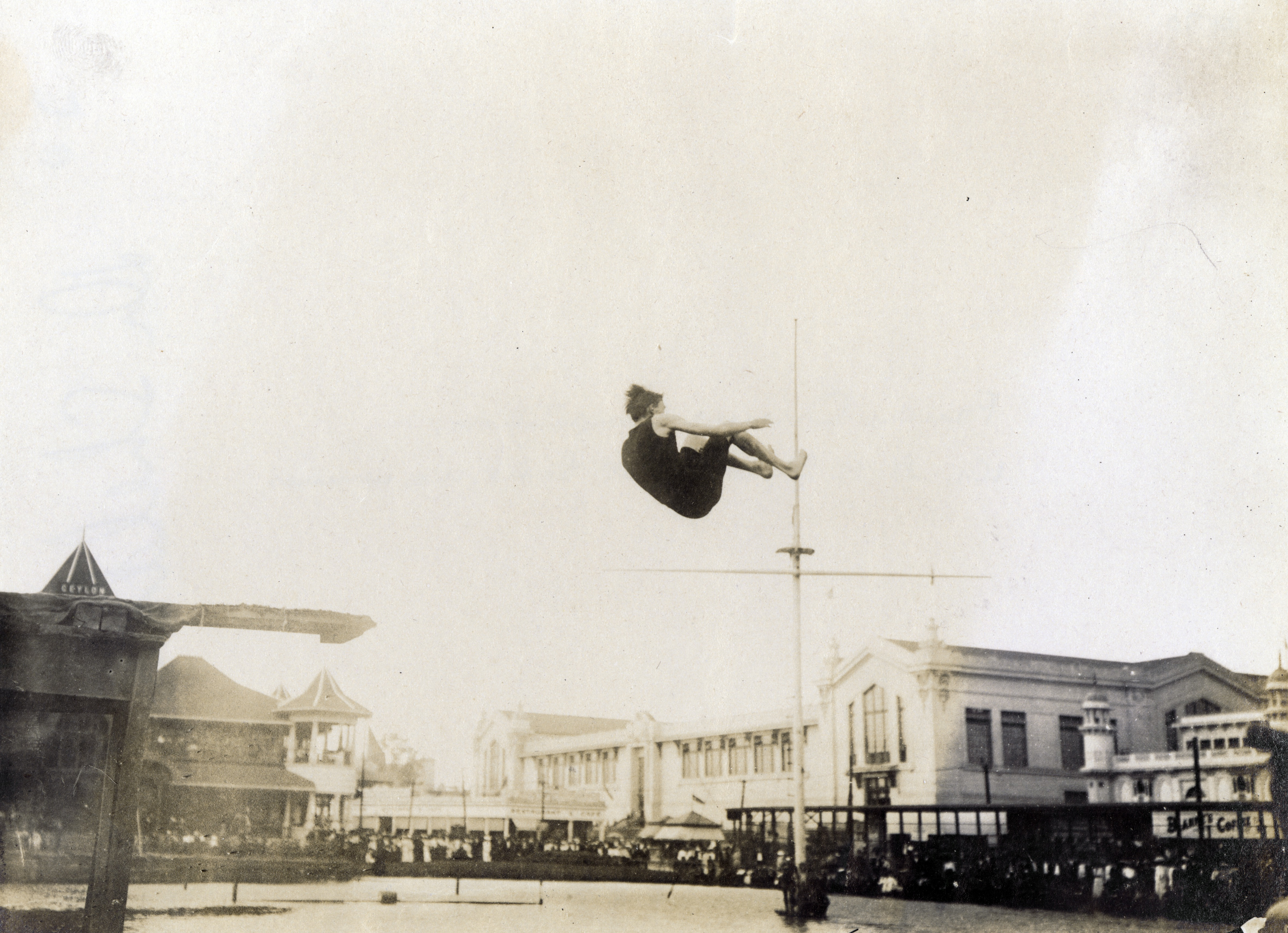
- George Sheldon
- Venue: Forest Park
- Date: 7 September 1904
- Competitors: 5 from 2 nations

Medalists
1st place, gold medalist(s)		George Sheldon	United States
2nd place, silver medalist(s)		Georg Hoffmann	Germany
3rd place, bronze medalist(s)		Frank Kehoe	United States

The platform diving was a diving event held as part of the diving at the 1904 Summer Olympics programme. It was the first time diving events were held at the Olympics. The competition was held on Wednesday, 7 September 1904. Five divers from two nations competed.

Braunschweiger refused to dive-off for the bronze medal so it was awarded to Kehoe.

== Results ==
Rank	Diver	Nation	Score
1st place, gold medalist(s)	George Sheldon	United States	12.66
2nd place, silver medalist(s)	Georg Hoffmann	Germany	11.66
3rd place, bronze medalist(s)	Frank Kehoe	United States	11.33
4	Alfred Braunschweiger	Germany	11.33
5	Otto Hooff	Germany	Unknown

== Sources ==
- Wudarski, Pawel (1999). "Wyniki Igrzysk Olimpijskich" (in Polish). Archived from the original on 16 February 2009.
