= Swimming at the 1904 Summer Olympics – Men's 100 yard backstroke =

Men's 100 yard backstroke at the Games of the III Olympiad
- Venue: Forest Park
- Date: September 6
- Competitors: 6 from 2 nations

Medalists
1st place, gold medalist(s)		Walter Brack	Germany
2nd place, silver medalist(s)		Georg Hoffmann	Germany
3rd place, bronze medalist(s)		Georg Zacharias	Germany

The men's 100 yard backstroke was a swimming event held as part of the Swimming at the 1904 Summer Olympics programme. It was the first time the event was held at such a distance at the Olympics and the only time yards rather than metres were used.

6 swimmers from 2 nations competed.

== Results ==
=== Final ===
Final
Gold	Walter Brack (GER)	1:16.8
Silver	Georg Hoffmann (GER)	
Bronze	Georg Zacharias (GER)	
4.	Bill Orthwein (USA)	
5-6	David Hammond (USA)	
5-6	Edwin Swatek (USA)	

== Sources ==
- Wudarski, Pawel (1999). "Wyniki Igrzysk Olimpijskich" (in Polish).
