= Swimming at the 1904 Summer Olympics – Men's 440 yard breaststroke =

Men's 440 yard breaststroke at the Games of the III Olympiad
- Venue: Forest Park
- Date: September 7
- Competitors: 4 from 2 nations

Medalists
1st place, gold medalist(s)		Georg Zacharias	Germany
2nd place, silver medalist(s)		Walter Brack	Germany
3rd place, bronze medalist(s)		Jam Handy	United States

The men's 440 yard breaststroke was a swimming event held as part of the Swimming at the 1904 Summer Olympics programme. It was the first time any breaststroke event was held at the Olympics. Two later editions of the swimming programme used the 400 metre breaststroke, but the shorter 200 and 100 metre races became more common.

4 swimmers from 2 nations competed.

== Results ==
Rank	Swimmer	Nation	Time
1st place, gold medalist(s)	Georg Zacharias	Germany	7:23.6
2nd place, silver medalist(s)	Walter Brack	Germany	Unknown
3rd place, bronze medalist(s)	Jam Handy	United States	Unknown
4	Georg Hoffmann	Germany	Unknown

== Sources ==
- Wudarski, Pawel (1999). "Wyniki Igrzysk Olimpijskich" (in Polish).
