= Ervin Barker =

American high jumper

Personal information
- Full name: Ervin Jeremiah Barker
- Born: June 2, 1883 Cresco, Iowa, U.S.
- Died: 1961 (aged 77–78)

Sport
- Sport: Track and field
- Event: High jump

Ervin Jeremiah Barker (June 2, 1883 – 1961) was an American athlete. He competed in the men's high jump at the 1904 Summer Olympics. Barker also won handicap high jump at the 1904 Olympic Games, a non-medal event. He later attended law school and practiced as lawyer in Spokane, Washington.
