= Al Brady =

American criminal

- Born: Alfred James Brady; October 25, 1910; Indianapolis, Indiana, U.S.
- Died: October 12, 1937 (aged 26); Bangor, Maine, U.S.
- Cause of death: Gunshot wounds
- Resting place: Mount Hope Cemetery; Bangor, Maine; 44°49′29″N 68°43′28″W
- Criminal charges: Bank robbery and murder
- Capture status: Killed by FBI agents

Alfred James "Al" Brady (October 25, 1910 – October 12, 1937) was an Indiana-born armed robber and murderer who became one of the FBI's "Public Enemies" in the 1930s. He and an accomplice were shot dead in an ambush by FBI agents in downtown Bangor, Maine, in 1937. The spectacular public gun-battle that led to the demise of "The Brady Gang" is an essential part of Maine history, and was even the subject of a re-enactment in 2007.

== Biography ==
Al Brady lost his father at age 2, his mother at age 16 and his stepfather at age 18. Two months after his stepfather's death he committed his first robbery, in Indianapolis, Indiana, in which he was shot and wounded. On release from jail, he teamed up with Clarence Lee Shaffer Jr., James Dalhover, and Charles Geisking. The gang stole cars and committed armed robberies across Indiana, mostly of grocery stores. They eventually murdered a 23-year-old Indianapolis store clerk, and then Indianapolis policeman Richard Rivers. The gang was also suspected of killing a policeman in Anderson, Indiana, in 1935. The four were captured in 1936, but Brady, Dalhover, and Shaffer escaped from a jail in Greenfield, Indiana, and then robbed a bank in Goodland, Indiana, in May 1937. In fleeing the robbery, they managed to ambush and kill one of their pursuers, Indiana State Police trooper Paul Minneman, and severely injured another. The gang then relocated, first to Baltimore, then to Bridgeport, Connecticut, and eventually to Bangor, Maine.

== In Bangor, Maine ==
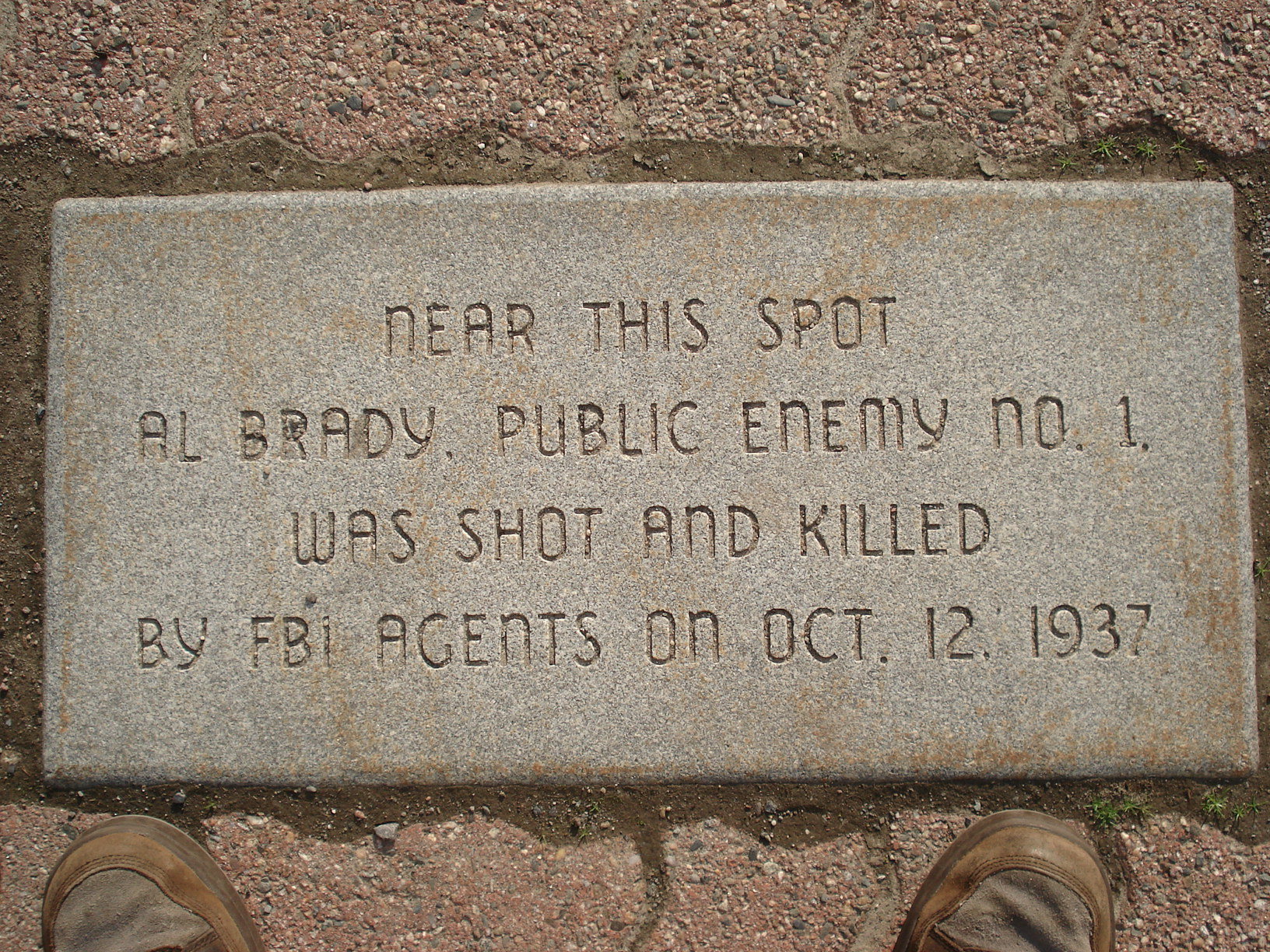
Marker in Bangor, Maine, where Al Brady was killed by FBI agents.

The three arrived in Bangor, having accumulated about $5,000 from their spree of robberies. Brady believed Maine to be an easy place to procure large numbers of guns and amounts of ammunition without suspicion, because of the extensive hunting in the area.

Relaxing their guard in Bangor, the trio began negotiating the purchase of Thompson submachine guns at the downtown Dakin's Sporting Goods Store. On September 21, 1937, they first approached the store. Brady asked the owner, Everett Hurd, for 500 rounds of .30-caliber ammunition. One of the party took out a large roll of money in large bills, which drew the suspicion of the owner. Hurd contacted the police after taking their order and telling them to return in a few weeks. When the three later returned to pick up the guns, on October 12, 1937, a large number of FBI agents were waiting in ambush, inside the store and across the street. Dalhover entered Dakin's alone and was apprehended after a scuffle. Brady and Shaffer drew their weapons in the street and were shot down in a furious exchange.

Photographs of their bullet-ridden bodies lying dead in the middle of Central Street became iconic local images, and long hung behind the counter at Dakin's. In the photographs, a large crowd of people is shown gathered. Coincidentally, it was Columbus Day, and celebrants had already thronged the streets before the shooting began.

Brady and Shaffer were killed by FBI agent Walter Walsh, who had been badly wounded, but survived, and lived to be the FBI's oldest retired special agent.

Dalhover was convicted in Indiana under federal statutes for the bank robbery in Goodland and the murder of the state trooper. He was executed by electrocution on November 18, 1938, at the Indiana State Prison in Michigan City, Indiana.

With no living relatives, Brady's body went unclaimed, and he was buried in an unmarked grave at Mount Hope Cemetery in Bangor. In 2007 the grave was finally marked with a stone and a brief religious ceremony conducted, in conjunction with a re-enactment of the shoot-out in Bangor's downtown.

== Depiction in literature ==
The murder of fictional gangster Al Bradley in Derry, Maine, in Stephen King's novel It is a fictionalized account of the shooting in Bangor.

== Bibliography ==
- Scee, Trudy Irene (2015), Public Enemy Number One: The True Story of the Brady Gang, Camden, Maine: Down East Books, ISBN 978-1-608935-11-6, OCLC 921889266

== Footnotes ==
- Time, June 7, 1937
- Time, Oct. 25, 1937
- "Brady Gang is Wiped Out Planning Bangor Bank Raid", The New York Times, Oct. 13, 1937
- "Brady Buried as Pauper", The New York Times, Oct. 16, 1937
- "Dalhover Put to Death", The New York Times, Nov. 18, 1938
