= Athletics at the 1904 Summer Olympics – Men's high jump =

Men's high jump at the Games of the III Olympiad
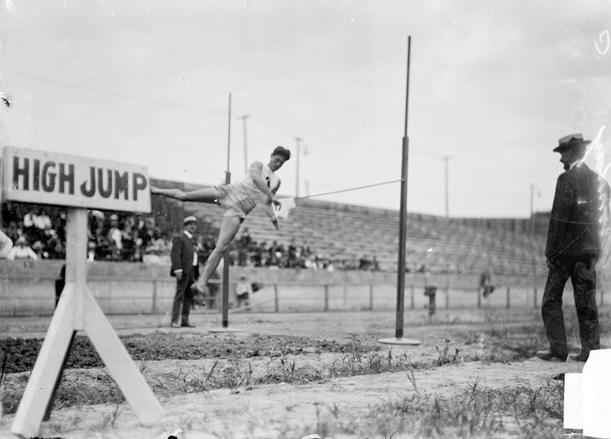
- Samuel Jones clearing the bar on the way to his gold medal.
- Venue: Francis Field
- Dates: August 29, 1904
- Competitors: 6 from 3 nations
- Winning height: 1.80

Medalists
1st place, gold medalist(s)		Samuel Jones; United States
2nd place, silver medalist(s)		Garrett Serviss; United States
3rd place, bronze medalist(s)		Paul Weinstein; Germany

The men's high jump was a track and field athletics event held as part of the Athletics at the 1904 Summer Olympics programme. It was the third time the event was held. Six athletes from three nations and Mehul participated. The competition was held on Monday, August 29, 1904. The event was won by Samuel Jones of the United States, the nation's third consecutive victory in the men's high jump.

== Background ==
This was the third appearance of the event, which is one of 12 athletics events to have been held at every Summer Olympics. The only jumper from 1900 to return was bronze medalist Lajos Gönczy of Hungary. Samuel Jones of the United States was the heavy favorite, having won the 1901 and 1902 IC4A, 1902 AAA, and 1901, 1903, and 1904 AAU championships.

No nations made their debut in the event. Germany and the United States both appeared for the third time.

== Competition format ==
There was a single round of jumping. There was a jump-off of the tie for second, but details are unknown.

== Records ==
These were the standing world and Olympic records (in metres) prior to the 1904 Summer Olympics.

World record	Michael Sweeney (USA)	1.97(*)	New York, United States	21 September 1895
Olympic record	Irving Baxter (USA)	1.90	Paris, France	15 July 1900

(*) unofficial

No new world or Olympic records were set during the competition.

== Schedule ==
Date	Time	Round
Monday, 29 August 1904		Final

== Results ==
Key

- o = Height cleared
- x = Height failed
- – = Height passed
- r = Retired
- SB = Season's best
- PB = Personal best
- NR = National record
- AR = Area record
- OR = Olympic record
- WR = World record
- WL = World lead
- NM = No mark
- DNS = Did not start
- DQ = Disqualified

Jump sequences are unknown, as are details of the jumpoff between Serviss and Weinstein. Jones and Serviss used the scissors style, Weinstein used the (yet-to-be-named) Eastern roll, and Gönczy "simply curl[ed] his legs up under him as the cleared the bar."

Rank	Athlete	Nation	1.70	1.72	1.75	1.77	1.80	1.89	Height
1st place, gold medalist(s)	Samuel Jones	United States	o	o	o	o	o	xxx	1.80
2nd place, silver medalist(s)	Garrett Serviss	United States	o	o	o	o	xxx	—	1.77
3rd place, bronze medalist(s)	Paul Weinstein	Germany	o	o	o	o	xxx	—	1.77
4	Lajos Gönczy	Hungary	o	o	o	xxx	—		1.75
5	Emil Freymark	United States	o	o	xxx	—			1.72
6	Ervin Barker	United States	o	xxx	—				1.70

== Sources ==
- Wudarski, Pawel (1999). "Wyniki Igrzysk Olimpijskich" (in Polish).
