= Emil Schwegler =

American gymnast

Personal information
- Nationality: American
- Born: April 22, 1879; Basel, Switzerland
- Died: May 19, 1968 (aged 89); Janesville, Wisconsin, U.S.

Sport
- Sport: Gymnastics, shooting sports, bowling

Emil Schwegler (April 22, 1879 – May 19, 1968) was a Swiss-born American gymnast, sports shooter and bowler. He competed at the 1904 Summer Olympics.

== Biography ==
Schwegler was born in Basel, Switzerland, on April 22, 1879. He later moved to the United States with his family and became a naturalized citizen. He was said to have competed at the 1900 Summer Olympics for his home country, but this is unverified. In 1904, Schwegler was selected to represent the United States at that year's Olympics in gymnastics and athletics. He competed in the following events: men's triathlon (in gymnastics), men's triathlon (in athletics), men's artistic individual all-around (in gymnastics), and the men's team competition (in gymnastics). He was affiliated with the St. Louis Schweizer Turnverein, and was the only participant there with that team. Schwegler's highest placement was 21st.

Later, Schwegler attended and graduated from Central College of Osteopathy in Kansas City, Missouri, and for many years was a licensed osteopath physician. He moved to Janesville, Wisconsin, in the 1910s, where he continued his practice until retiring after 40 years. He enjoyed participating in sports shooting events, winning more than 40 awards as a marksman, and also was a prominent bowler in the state.

Schwegler was named president of the Janesville Bowling Association (JBA) in 1924, and was their secretary from 1925 to 1936. He became a member of the Wisconsin State Bowling Association (WSBA) board of directors in 1929, and later served in chief executive positions. For two seasons he served as the association's vice president. He also was a president and secretary of numerous local leagues, as well as helped found the "All-Star League," later known as the "Major League." Schwegler retired in 1954. He was given the honorary position of life director of the WSBA.

Schwegler died in May 1968, at the age of 89. He was posthumously inducted into the JBA Hall of Fame in 1976.
