= Emil Freymark =

American high jumper

Emil Freymark (March 4, 1876 – May 26, 1936) was an American track and field athlete who competed in the 1904 Summer Olympics. In 1904 he was fifth in high jump competition. He was born and died in St. Louis, Missouri.
