= Rudolf Schrader =

American artistic gymnast

Personal information
- Nickname: Rudy
- Nationality: German
- Born: March 17, 1875 Magdeburg, Germany
- Died: January 18, 1981 (aged 105) Berwyn, Illinois, United States

Sport
- Sport: Gymnastics
- Club: Turnverein Vorwärts

Rudolf Schrader (also spelled Rudolph) (March 17, 1875 – January 18, 1981) was an American gymnast who competed at the 1904 Summer Olympics in St. Louis. As a member of the Turnverein Vorwärts club he placed seventh in the team all-around and participated in three individual events, his best finish being 68th in the gymnastic triathlon. Born in Germany, Schrader moved to the United States at the age of 15 and worked as a cabinetmaker while training as a gymnast. After the Olympics he joined Sears and remained with them until his retirement at the age of 65. Until he was surpassed by Walter Walsh in March 2013, Schrader was the longest-lived Olympian, having died in January 1981 at the age of 105.

== Early life ==
Schrader was born in Magdeburg, Germany on March 17, 1875. He joined the Arbeiter Turnverein gymnastics club and took up a job as an apprentice cabinetmaker, but later traveled to Chicago with financial backing from relatives who already lived in the United States. There he soon joined the Turnverein Vorwärts club and resumed his participation in gymnastics, working as a cabinetmaker to repay his passage debts.

== Athletic career ==
Schrader participated in his first local Turnfest, a German gymnastics tournament, as a senior in 1895 and his first national one in 1897. After participating at the 1900 national Turnfest, he competed in the 1904 Summer Olympics, where he finished seventh out of thirteen American clubs in the men's team event. Individually he placed 84th in the men's all-around, 68th in the gymnastic men's triathlon, and joint-95th in the athletic men's triathlon. He later held several administrative positions on the boards of various athletic clubs.

== Later life ==
Schrader worked as a cabinetmaker for Sears from 1906 until his 1940 retirement. He turned 100 in March 1975 and was still riding a bicycle at the age of 103. He died in Berwyn, Illinois on January 18, 1981, at the age of 105 years, 307 days, making him the longest lived Olympian. He held that title for over 32 years, until he was surpassed in age by Olympic shooter Walter Walsh of the United States in March 2013.
