= Lajos Gönczy =

Hungarian high jumper (1882–1915)

Medal record

Men's athletics

Representing Hungary

Olympic Games
Bronze medal – third place	1900 Paris	High jump

Lajos Gönczy (24 February 1882 – 3 December 1915) was a Hungarian high jumper. He participated in Athletics at the 1900 Summer Olympics in Paris, the 1904 Summer Olympics in St. Louis and the 1906 Intercalated Games in Athens and won two medals.

Gönczy was born in Szeged, he was educated in his local high school and this is where his talent started for athletics, after high school he attended the Pázmány Péter Catholic University to read law, and while there he joined the Budapest University Athletics Club,

Between 1900 and 1904, Gönczy held four national high jump records, aged 19 years old Gönczy traveled to Paris for the 1900 Summer Olympics, in the high jump there was no qualification it was straight to the final, Gönczy jumped 1.75 metres to finish third behind Irving Baxter and Patrick Leahy to earn the bronze medal. Four years later he went to St. Louis for the 1904 Summer Olympics, this time in the high jump he missed out on a medal by just 2 centimetres when he jumped 1.75 metres and finished fourth, Gönczy also competed in the standing high jump but only jumped 1.35 metres and finished last out of the competitors, he would compete in the same two events two years later at the 1906 Intercalated Games, in the high jump he finished in silver medal place just behind Con Leahy, he also went on to finish fifth again in the standing high jump.

In 1910 he retired from competitive events and returned to Szeged to work as a magistrate, he married in 1913, then at the beginning of World War I he joined the 46th Honvéd Infantry Brigade, and was mobilized to the Italian front in 1915, on 3 December 1915, his dugout received a direct hit killing him and two other officers. He died in Doberdò del Lago and was buried in the Vallone valley.

== See also ==
- List of Olympians killed in World War I
