= Walter Walsh =

Federal Bureau of Investigation agent and sport shooter

Colonel Walter Walsh
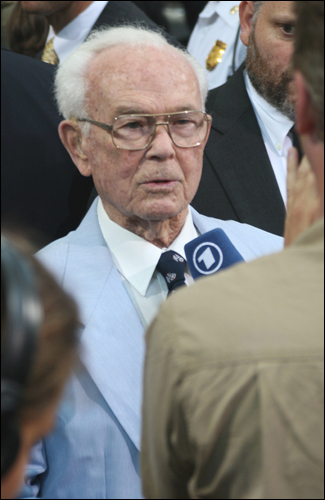
- Walter Walsh, aged 101, attends the Federal Bureau of Investigation's 100th anniversary gathering in 2008
- Born: May 4, 1907; West Hoboken, New Jersey, U.S.
- Died: April 29, 2014 (aged 106); Arlington, Virginia, U.S.
- Education: Rutgers Law School
- Occupations: FBI agent, USMC shooting instructor
- Military career
- Allegiance: United States
- Branch: United States Marine Corps
- Service years: 1942–1970
- Rank: Colonel
- Commands: Commander of marksmen training
- Conflicts: World War II: South West Pacific

Walter Walsh
Medal record

Representing United States

Men's shooting

ISSF World Shooting Championships
Gold medal – first place	1952 Oslo	25 m Center-Fire Pistol Team
Silver medal – second place	1952 Oslo	25 m Center-Fire Pistol Individual

Walter Rudolph Walsh (May 4, 1907 – April 29, 2014) was an FBI agent, USMC shooting instructor and Olympic shooter. Walsh joined the FBI in 1934, serving during the Public enemy era, and was involved in several high-profile FBI cases, including the capture of Arthur Barker and the killing of Al Brady. He served in the Pacific theatre during World War II with the Marine Corps and, after a brief return to the FBI, served as a shooting instructor with the Marine Corps until his retirement in the 1970s.

A high-profile shooter, Walsh won numerous tournaments within the FBI and the Marine Corps, as well as nationally, and participated in the 1948 Summer Olympics. He received awards for his marksmanship until the age of 90 and served as the coach of the Olympic shooting team until 2000. At the FBI's 100th anniversary celebration he was recognized as the oldest living former agent and noted as being a year older than the organization itself. Aside from some hearing and memory loss, he remained physically fit at his 103rd birthday and, in March 2013, became the longest-lived Olympic competitor.

== Early life ==
Walsh was born on May 4, 1907, to Dolinda (nee Invernizzi) and Walter Brooks Walsh in West Hoboken, New Jersey (later merged to form Union City). Walsh’s father was a firefighter and for a period operated a saloon. Walsh attended Emerson High School. When he was 16 years old he lied about his age in order to join the Civilian Military Training Corps. He subsequently joined the New Jersey Army National Guard in 1928.

== FBI career ==
After graduating from Rutgers Law School in 1931, Walsh joined the Federal Bureau of Investigation in 1934, becoming a member of the first cohort of agents permitted to carry firearms. His first assignment was to the Bureau’s office in St. Paul, Minnesota, covering four states.

Later that year, he discovered the body of gangster Baby Face Nelson, who died of injuries sustained in a gun battle with the police in Barrington, Illinois, on November 27, 1934. Nelson had killed two FBI agents prior to fleeing the scene, wounded, and later died at his wife's side. The FBI, unaware of Nelson's death, continued a broad search for him, which included several home raids, through the night and into the following day. The search was not called off until a tip led them to Nelson's body, which was lying in a ditch in what is now Skokie, Illinois.

Walsh was on the team that tracked criminal Arthur Barker, son of gangster Ma Barker, to Chicago in 1935. A subsequent search of Arthur's apartment revealed information that eventually led to locating other members of the Barker family. Later that same day Walsh became involved in an attempt to arrest bank robber Russell “Slim Gray” Gibson. Putting on a bulletproof vest and armed with a Browning automatic rifle and a .32 calibre pistol Gibson attempted to escape out the back, where he encountered Walsh, armed with a .351 Winchester Self-Loading rifle.

Walsh was later involved in the tracking down of Public Enemy Number One Al Brady in 1937. On October 12 of that year, he was with a group of FBI agents who ambushed Brady’s gang at Dakin’s, a Bangor, Maine sporting goods store. Warned by the store owner that some men was wanting to purchase some Thompson submachine guns and would be returning in a few days to collect them, the FBI believing them to be Brady and his gang decided to set a trap. The gang’s car drew up at 8:30 a.m. and when Brady Gang member James Dalhover entered the store he was apprehended by Walsh and taken to the back by other agents. As Dalhover was being interrogated, Brady and another gang member, Clarence Lee Shaffer, Jr., emerged from their parked car with guns in their hands. Walsh was approaching the front of the store with a gun in each hand. Upon reaching the glass front door he saw Shaffer looking though it at him. Both men fired simultaneously through the glass. Mortally wounded Shaffer collapsed to the sidewalk, while Walsh had been shot in his right hand and into his chest. Despite this he stepped outside firing with the gun in his left hand at Brady, who was still moving after having already been hit by the other law enforcement officers. Brady was killed. Despite being shot multiple times Walsh quickly returned to work.

== World War II ==
At the urging of friends on the Marine Corps Reserve Team, he applied to join the Marine Corps in 1938 and was given a reserve lieutenant commission. Walsh remained in the FBI until 1942, when he took a leave to serve with the United States Marine Corps during World War II. After he left, Hoover refused to allow any more active agents to be members of any military reserve. Commissioned as a lieutenant, Walsh spent his first two years of service training snipers at New River, North Carolina.)

After requesting combat duty in 1944, Walsh was sent to the Pacific Theater, specifically with 1st Marine Division on Okinawa. In one incident, he and his comrades were pinned down by a sniper on Okinawa, whom Walsh was able to kill from 90 yards away with a single shot to the torso from a M1911 pistol.

== Leaves the FBI ==
After the war ended, Walsh served with Marine Corps in North China, protecting railroads and supplies. Following the completion of these duties Walsh left active duty in 1946 and returned to the FBI. Believing that his days as an active agent were behind him, he resigned in 1947 to return to active duty with the Marine Corps. In total, during his tenure with the FBI, he killed between 11 and 17 suspects.

He went on to serve as the Officer-in-Charge of the Security Subsection, G-2, Headquarters Marine Corps, as the Assistant G-3 with the 2nd Marine Division and to later command the 1st Battalion, 8th Marines. In 1962 Walsh was assigned with the rank of colonel as the Commanding Officer of the Weapons Training Battalion at Quantico, where he remained until his retirement in 1970.

== Competition shooting ==
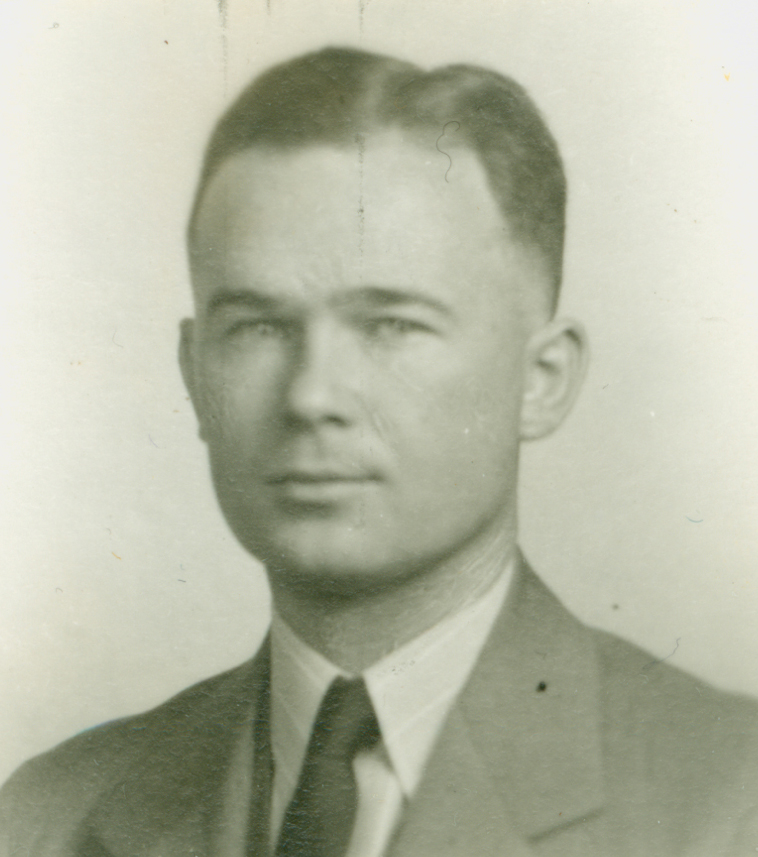
Walter Walsh in 1939

When Walsh was 12, his father gave him his first rifle, a .22-caliber Mossberg. He honed his marksmanship shooting rats in the New Jersey Meadowlands and clothespins off of his aunt's laundry line. It was while a member of the Civilian Military Training Corps, that Walsh received his first formal training. During his subsequent service with the New Jersey National Guard Walsh won a spot on its rifle team which led to him in 1928 engaging in his first competitive shooting at national matches at Camp Perry, Ohio.

By 1930 Walsh was good enough to win both rifle and pistol titles at the 37th Annual Sea Girt Interstate Tournament. He also won the Governor's Champion Marksman Match, the miss-and-out Swiss Match, and the 15-shot, 1100-yard Libby Trophy Match, which established him as one of the best rifle and pistol shooters of the period. Despite a lack of experience with this type of shooting, Walsh competed in the smallbore rifle event at the National Matches in 1932, and did so well that he was selected as an alternate on the elite Dewar Trophy Team. In that same year he won the Wimbledon and American Legion Smallbore Matches. In 1933 Walsh was selected as a firing member of the Dewar Team, and broke the Dewar smallbore rifle record. In that same year he set a new record in the smallbore national match course at Rumford, Rhode Island, and became the New Jersey State Pistol Champion.

In 1935, he joined the FBI pistol team. Within three years of joining the FBI, he had been presented with two marksmanship trophies from director J. Edgar Hoover. In 1939, at Camp Ritchie, he set the world record in pistol shooting with 198 points out of a possible 200 and won the individual eastern regional pistol championships in 1939 and 1940 and placing second in 1941 after leading for most of the tournament. He placed 12th in the Men's Free Pistol, 50 metres competition at the 1948 Summer Olympics in London. At the 1952 ISSF World Shooting Championships, he won a gold medal with the United States team in the 25 m Center-Fire Pistol event and a silver in the individual version of that event.

In the late 1970s Walsh took up muzzle loading and black powder shooting, serving as both coach and active shooter on several U.S. international muzzleloading teams. Walsh also served for many years as a director of the National Rifle Association and served on several of its committees. In total, he was selected five times for the All-American Pistol Shooting Team.

== Later life ==
As late as 1997, he was still receiving awards for his marksmanship, winning the Outstanding American Handgunner of the Year. Until 2000 he served as a coach for the Olympic shooting team, able to see without the aid of glasses even at the age of 92. At the age of 100 he was present at a re-enactment of the Al Brady shoot out in Bangor, Maine. At this event, he was presented with a plaque and the key to the city. At the age of 101, he was the FBI's oldest living former agent and was in excellent physical shape, aside from some hearing and memory loss. He credited his longevity to luck, listening to his parents and blessings from God. At the 100th anniversary celebration of the FBI, it was noted that Walsh was older than the agency itself. In March 2013, at the age of 105, he surpassed American gymnast Rudolf Schrader to become the longest-lived Olympic competitor.

Walsh died at his home in Arlington, Virginia, on April 29, 2014, at the age of 106. He was interred beside his wife on July 15, 2014 in section 8, grave 7198 at Arlington National Cemetery.

== Personal life ==
In 1936 Walsh married Kathleen Barber (March 31, 1913 to December 21, 1980). The couple had five children: Walter, Gerald, Kathleen, Rosemary and Linda and by the time of Walsh’s death seventeen grandchildren. On May 26, 2007, a grandson, Sergeant Nicholas R. Walsh, a reconnaissance team leader with Charlie Company, First Platoon of the First Marine Division, was killed by sniper fire in Fallujah, Iraq, three weeks after Walsh’s 100th birthday.
