= John Grieb =

American gymnast (1879–1939)

Medal record

Representing the United States

Olympic Games

Men's gymnastics
Gold medal – first place	1904 St Louis	Team

Men's triathlon
Silver medal – second place	1904 St Louis	Triathlon

John William Grieb (November 19, 1879 – December 10, 1939) was an American gymnast and track and field athlete who competed in the 1904 Summer Olympics. He was born in Philadelphia. In 1904 he won the gold medal in the gymnastics' team event and silver medal in the athletics' triathlon event. He was also sixth in athletics' all-around event, 52nd in gymnastics' all-around event and 90th in gymnastics' triathlon event.
