= Edward Siegler =

American gymnast

Olympic medal record

Men's Gymnastics
Bronze medal – third place	1904 St Louis	Team

Edward Victor Siegler (August 14, 1881 – January 28, 1942) was an American gymnast and track and field athlete who competed in the 1904 Summer Olympics. In 1904 he won the bronze medal in the team event. He was also 12th in athletics' triathlon event, 32nd in gymnastics all-around event and 53rd in gymnastics' triathlon event.
