= George Sheldon (diver) =

American diver (1874–1907)

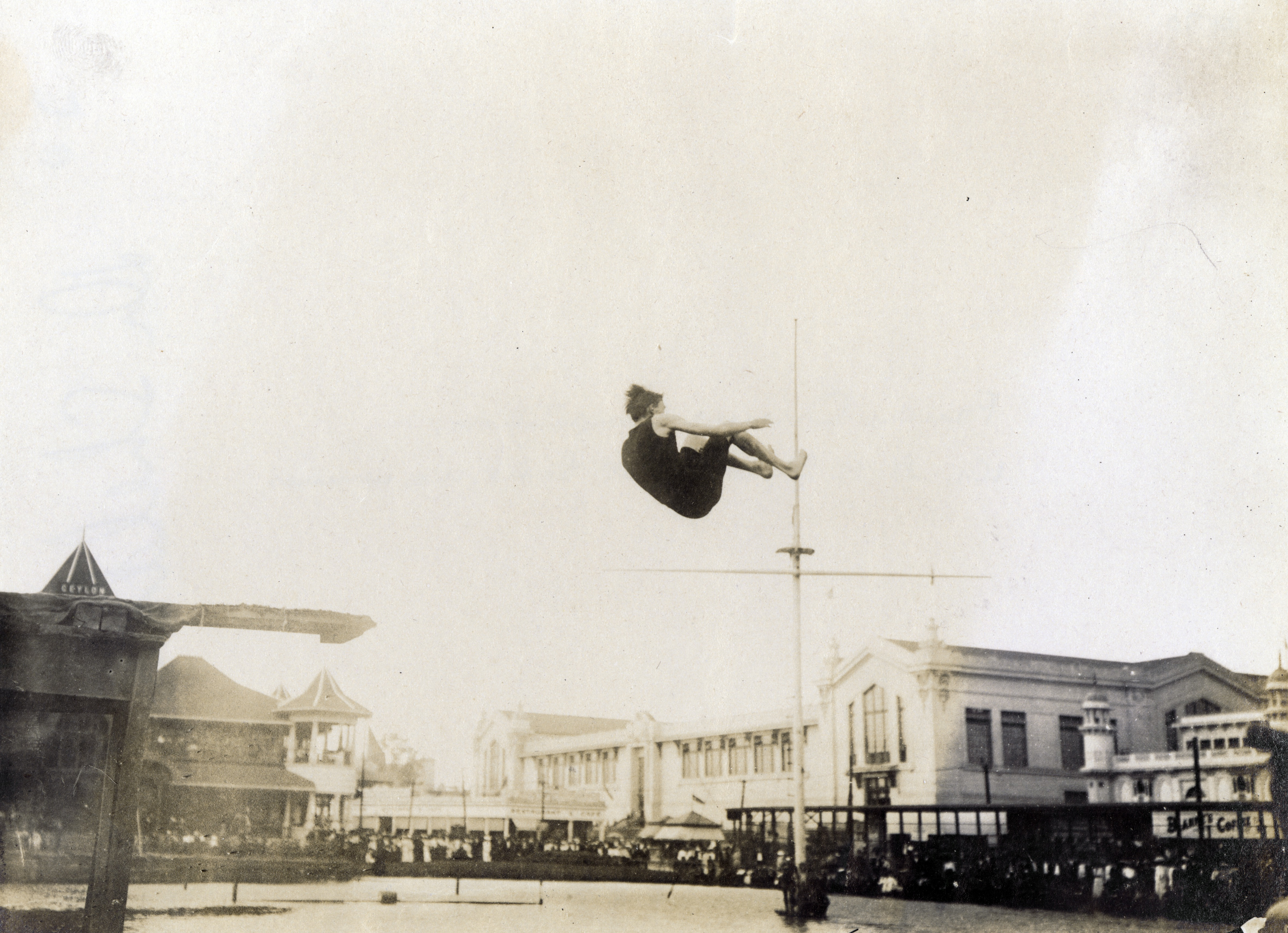

Personal information
- Born: May 17, 1874 St. Louis, Missouri, United States
- Died: November 25, 1907 (aged 33) St. Louis, Missouri, United States

Sport
- Sport: Diving
Medal record
Representing the United States
Olympic Games
Gold medal – first place	1904 St. Louis	Platform

George Herbert Sheldon (May 17, 1874 – November 25, 1907) was an American diver who competed in the 1904 Summer Olympics and won the inaugural platform diving competition.

Sheldon was an eye doctor from St. Louis, MO, who had studied at the Barnes Medical College in St. Louis, MO. Through most of his life he had suffered from a weak heart which would eventually result in his death. In the 1904 Olympics he won the gold medal in platform diving but faced controversy as his victory was contested by the Germans. The German competitors were more like stunt divers which was entertaining but on entry into the water they often landed on their bellies or legs, while the American team concentrated more on the entry rather than fancy diving. It was not until a week later that the Games director James E. Sullivan rejected the protests and declared Sheldon the winner.

A year later in 1905, Sheldon won the National AAU diving championships, which was the first using the diving rule book and allowed international divers, however he was prevented from trying to regain the title due to his heart problems while training.

On November 25, 1907, aged just 33 years old Sheldon died in his home city of St Louis due to a heart lesion.

In 1989, Sheldon was honored by the International Swimming Hall of Fame for being a pioneer diver.

== See also ==
- List of members of the International Swimming Hall of Fame
