= Emil Beyer =

American gymnast

- Born: November 22, 1876 New York, U.S.
- Died: October 15, 1934 (aged 57) Rockville Centre, New York, U.S.

Gymnastics career
- Discipline: Men's artistic gymnastics
- Country represented: United States
- Club: New York Turnverein
- Retired: c. 1904
Medal record
Men's artistic gymnastics
Representing United States
Event	1st	2nd	3rd
Olympic Games	0	1	0
Total	0	1	0
Olympic Games
Silver medal – second place	1904 St. Louis	Team

Emil Beyer (November 22, 1876 in New York – October 15, 1934 in Rockville Centre, New York) was an American gymnast and track and field athlete who competed in the 1904 Summer Olympics.

Born to German immigrant parents in New York state, Beyer was a member of the New York Turnverein. In 1904 he won the silver medal in the team event. He was also 30th in gymnastics all-around event, 34th in gymnastics' triathlon event and 36th in athletics' triathlon event.

He entered the United States Military Academy in 1897, but failed to graduate. In later life, he operated a drug store.
