= John Bissinger =

American gymnast

- Full name: John Frederick Bissinger Jr.
- Born: January 7, 1879 New York City, New York, U.S.
- Died: January 20, 1941 (aged 62) The Bronx, New York, U.S.
- Height: 1.80 m (5 ft 11 in)

Gymnastics career
- Discipline: Men's artistic gymnastics
- Country represented: United States
- Club: New York Turnverein
- Retired: c. 1921
Medal record
Men's artistic gymnastics
Representing United States
Event	1st	2nd	3rd
Olympic Games	0	1	0
Total	0	1	0
Olympic Games
Silver medal – second place	1904 St. Louis	Team

John Frederick Bissinger Jr. (January 7, 1879 in New York, New York – January 20, 1941 in Bronx, New York) was an American gymnast and track and field athlete who competed in the 1904 Summer Olympics.

In 1904, Bissinger won the silver medal in the team event. He was also fifth in the athletics' triathlon event, eights in the gymnastics all-around event and 14th in the gymnastics' triathlon event. He was inducted into the USA Gymnastics Hall of Fame in 1993.

Bissinger later coached gymnastics at New York University. He continued to compete until c. 1921. He was considered one of the greatest master gymnasts and best known turner in the United States.
