= Georg Zacharias =

German swimmer

Personal information
- Born: June 14, 1884 Gdańsk, German Empire
- Died: July 31, 1953 (aged 69) West Berlin, West Germany

Sport
- Sport: Swimming
Medal record
Representing Germany
Olympic Games
Gold medal – first place	1904 St. Louis	440 yard breaststroke
Bronze medal – third place	1904 St. Louis	100 yard backstroke

Georg Zacharias (14 June 1884 – 31 July 1953) was a German backstroke and breaststroke swimmer who competed in the 1904 Summer Olympics. He was born in Gdańsk and died in Berlin. In the 1904 Olympics he won a gold medal in the 440 yard breaststroke and a bronze medal in the 100 yard backstroke.
