= Max Hess (gymnast) =

American gymnast (born 1877)

Personal information
- Born: December 29, 1877 Coburg, Germany
- Died: June 22, 1969 (aged 81) Philadelphia, Pennsylvania
- Occupation: retail sales
- Height: 165 cm (5 ft 5 in)
- Weight: 71 kg (157 lb)
- Spouse: Clara Hierholzer

Sport
- Club: Philadelphia Turgemeinde
Medal record
Men's gymnastics
Representing the United States
Olympic Games
Gold medal – first place	1904 St Louis	Team

Max Hess (December 29, 1877 – June 22, 1969) was an American gymnast and track and field athlete who competed in the 1904 Summer Olympics in St. Louis. He was born in Coburg, Germany, and came to America at an early age, settling in Philadelphia.

In 1904 he won the gold medal in gymnastics in the team event. He was also 10th in athletics' triathlon event, 31st in gymnastics' all-around competition and 50th in gymnastics' triathlon event.

He was affiliated with Philadelphia's well-known Turngemeinde Athletic Club, a successful organization that sent seven other athletes to the 1904 Olympics. The Turngemeinde was one of the oldest German-American Turner, or gymnastics clubs in the United States, and was founded in 1849. An extensive club, it originally taught gymnastics, fencing, singing, drawing, writing and ladies' needlework. Helping German immigrants acclimate to life in America, the club also offered social events, including an annual ball and originally maintained a lending library.

In July 1908, he competed again and made a good showing in both all round gymnastics competition and field sports in St. Louis at the International Gymnastics Tournament at Frankfort-on-the-Main.

In Philadelphia, he worked at Hess and Young, the family company store, specializing in printing and bookbinding services, where in the 1940's he was in business with his relatives Carl and George. The family company was in business as early as 1900, and continues to specialize in platemaking services for printing and bookbinding.

He died in Philadelphia on June 22, 1969, and was predeceased by his wife Clara Hierholzer.
