= Max Emmerich =

American athletics competitor

Olympic medal record

Men's athletics

Representing the United States
Gold medal – first place	1904 St Louis	Triathlon

Max Philip Emmerich (June 1, 1879 – June 29, 1956) was an American track and field athlete and gymnast who competed in the 1904 Summer Olympics. He was born and died in Indianapolis, Indiana.

In 1904 he won the gold medal in the athletics' triathlon event. He also was 67th in gymnastics' all-around event, 100th in gymnastics' triathlon event and did not finish the first event in athletics all-around competition.
