= Otto Hooff =

German diver

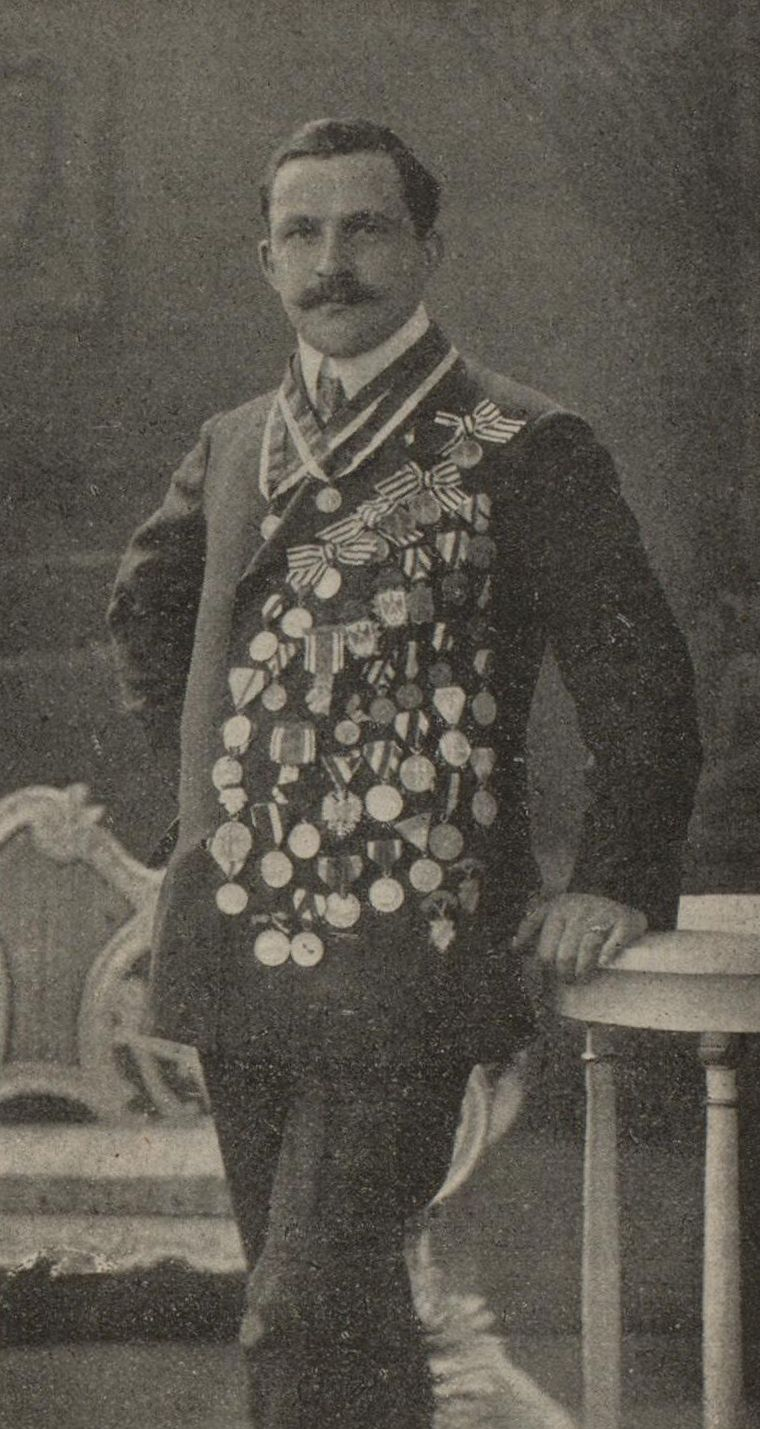

Personal information
- Born: 29 March 1881 Berlin, German Empire
- Died: 21 December 1960 (aged 79) Bremen, West Germany

Sport
- Sport: Diving

Otto Hermann Hooff (29 March 1881 – 21 December 1960) was a German diver who competed in the 1904 Summer Olympics. In 1904, he finished fifth in the platform competition.
