= Philip Schuster (gymnast) =

American gymnast

Olympic medal record

Men's Gymnastics
Bronze medal – third place	1904 St Louis	Team

Philip Mat Schuster (January 24, 1883 – October 31, 1926) was an American gymnast and track and field athlete who competed in the 1904 Summer Olympics. In 1904 he won the bronze medal in the team event. He was also 51st in gymnastics' all-around event, 54th in gymnastics' triathlon competition, and 55th in athletics' triathlon event.
