= Ernst Reckeweg =

American gymnast and athlete

Medal record

Men's gymnastics

Representing the United States

Olympic Games
Gold medal – first place	1904 St. Louis	Team

Ernst Heinrich Dietrich Reckeweg (April 18, 1873 – September 5, 1944) was an American gymnast and track and field athlete who competed in the 1904 Summer Olympics. He was born in the German Empire.

In 1904 he won the gold medal in the team event. He was also 19th in athletics' triathlon event, 47th in gymnastics all-around event and 67th in gymnastics triathlon event.
