= Philip Kassel =

American gymnast (1876–1959)

Medal record

Men's gymnastics

Representing the United States

Olympic Games
| Gold medal – first place | 1904 St. Louis | Team |

Philip Kassel (September 22, 1876 – May 25, 1959) was an American gymnast and track and field athlete who competed in the 1904 Summer Olympics. He was born in the German Empire. In 1904 he won the gold medal in the team event. He was also 6th in athletics' triathlon event, 11th in gymnastics' all-around competition and 19th in gymnastics' triathlon event.
