= Robert Maysack =

American gymnast (1872–1960)

Olympic medal record

Men's Gymnastics
Bronze medal – third place	1904 St Louis	Team

Robert Emil Maysack (November 25, 1872 – December 24, 1960) was an American gymnast and track and field athlete who competed in the 1904 Summer Olympics. He died in Highlands County, Florida.

In 1904 he won the bronze medal in the team event. He was also 55th in gymnastics' triathlon event, 59th in gymnastics' all-around competition and 70th in athletics' triathlon event.
