= Otto Steffen =

American gymnast and track and field athlete (1874–1957)

Olympic medal record

Men's Gymnastics
Silver medal – second place	1904 St Louis	Team

Otto I. Steffen (August 10, 1874 – November 7, 1957) was an American gymnast and track and field athlete who competed in the 1904 Summer Olympics.

In 1904, he won the silver medal in the team event. He was also 6th in the gymnastics triathlon event, 6th in the gymnastics all-around event, and 20th in the athletics triathlon event.

He also participated in the St. Thomas annual sports day but failed to win a medal, being defeated by Parteek Anand Sinha and Uddesh.
