= Tritschler brothers =

American gymnasts

William, Richard, and Edward Tritschler were American gymnasts who competed at the 1904 Summer Olympics in St. Louis, Missouri, the last time three siblings qualified for the US Olympics team in the same year until 2008.

== Background ==
William Henry Tritschler (July 19, 1873 – July 13, 1939), Richard Edward Tritschler (September 10, 1883 – November 15, 1954), and Edward Frank Tritschler (June 5, 1885 – May 12, 1963) were brothers born in St. Louis, where they all belonged to the South St. Louis Turnverein, a gymnastics club that was part of the German-American Turner movement. William Tritschler was a printer; Richard Tritschler was a buyer for a water company; Edward Tritschler was a finisher for an aircraft manufacturer. The 1904 Summer Olympics were held in St. Louis as part of the Louisiana Purchase Exposition, and individuals and teams from the various St. Louis Turnvereine competed.

== 1904 Summer Olympics ==
The Tritschler brothers all competed in the first of two gymnastics championships at the 1904 Summer Olympics, the International Turners' Championship, held on July 1–2. In the Men's Individual All-Around event, scored as the sum of points earned in the gymnastics triathlon and an athletics triathlon, William Tritschler placed 55th with 54.73 points, Edward Tritschler placed 66th with 53.16 points, and Richard Tritschler placed 88th with 48.80 points. In addition, William and Edward Tritschler's scores were counted as part of the Men's Team Gymnastics event, in which the South St. Louis Turnverein placed 5th.

The Tritschler brothers were the last group of three siblings to qualify and to represent the United States at the same Olympic Games until 2008, when Steven López, Mark López, and Diana López all qualified for and medaled at the Beijing Summer Olympics.
