= Samuel Jones (athlete) =

American high jumper (1880–1954)

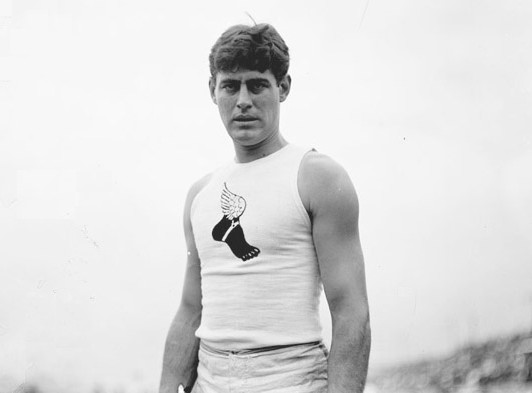
- Jones in 1904

Personal information
- Born: January 16, 1880 Fairfield, Connecticut, U.S.
- Died: April 13, 1954 (aged 74) Knoxville, Tennessee, U.S.

Sport
- Sport: Athletics
- Event: high jump
- Club: New York University Violets & NYAC
Medal record
Men's athletics
Representing the United States
Olympic Games
Gold medal – first place	1904 St Louis	High jump

Samuel Symington Jones (January 16, 1880 – April 13, 1954) was an American athlete who competed mainly in the high jump. He competed for the United States in the 1904 Summer Olympics held in St Louis, United States in the high jump where he won the gold medal.

== Biography ==
Jones won the British AAA Championships high jump title at the 1902 AAA Championships.

Two years later in 1904, Jones represented the United States at the 1904 Olympics, winning the high jump event.
