= Julian Schmitz =

American gymnast

Olympic medal record

Men's Gymnastics
Silver medal – second place	1904 St Louis	Team

Julian Frank Schmitz (September 15, 1881 – July 5, 1943) was an American gymnast and track and field athlete who competed in the 1904 Summer Olympics. In 1904 he won the silver medal in the team event. He was also 32nd in gymnastics' triathlon event, 57th in gymnastics' all-around event and 101st in athletics' triathlon event.
