= Julius Lenhart =

Austrian gymnast (1875–1962)

- Born: 27 November 1875 Vienna, Austria-Hungary
- Died: 10 November 1962 (aged 86) Vienna, Austria

Gymnastics career
- Discipline: Men's artistic gymnastics
- Retired: 1908
Medal record
Representing the United States Philadelphia Turngemeinde
Olympic Games
Gold medal – first place	1904 St. Louis	Individual all-around
Gold medal – first place	1904 St. Louis	Team all-around
Silver medal – second place	1904 St. Louis	Triathlon

Julius Lenhart (27 November 1875 – 10 November 1962) was an Austrian gymnast who competed in the 1904 Summer Olympics. He won two gold medals and one silver medal, making him the most successful Austrian competitor ever at the Summer Olympic Games.

== Biography ==
Lenhart began his gymnastics career in Vienna, where he trained at a local gymnastics club. As a mechanical engineer, his work took him to Germany and Switzerland, where he continued to compete for local clubs during the early 20th century. In 1903, he emigrated to the United States, settling in Philadelphia, where he found employment and joined the 'Philadelphia Turngemeinde'.

Representing the Philadelphia Turngemeinde at the 1904 Summer Olympics in St. Louis, Lenhart won the gold medal in the individual all-around and the silver medal in triathlon at the gymnastics events. In addition, he also led the 'Philadelphia Turngemeinde' team to victory in the team all-around competition, earning his second gold medal. The event was contested by teams of six gymnasts, with the team score derived from the members' performances in the individual all-around, adjusted according to predetermined maximum scores for each apparatus.

Soon after the games, he returned to Austria, where he retired from gymnastics in 1908. He died November 10, 1962, in Vienna.

== Disputed country attribution ==
Lenhart's nationality at the time has been the subject of historical discussion, although the official 1904 Olympic entry lists recorded him as representing the United States. Because athletes did not compete for their nations at the early Olympic Games between 1896 and 1904, as they do now, his participation and both medals are attributed by the International Olympic Committee (IOC) to the United States, reflecting the club affiliation under which he competed rather than his nationality.

Since 2024, the IOC has applied this attribution policy consistently to all competitors and events at the early Olympic Games between 1896 and 1904, thereby confirming the attribution of Lenhart's two medals to the United States. His case is one of several early Olympic examples in which medal attribution follows club representation instead of the athlete's citizenship.
