= Walter Brack =

German swimmer (1880–1919)

Personal information
- Born: December 20, 1880 Berlin, German Empire
- Died: October 20, 1919 (aged 38) Berlin, Germany

Sport
- Sport: Swimming
Medal record
Representing Germany
Olympic Games
Gold medal – first place	1904 St. Louis	100 yard backstroke
Silver medal – second place	1904 St. Louis	440 yard breaststroke

Walter Brack (December 20, 1880 – October 20, 1919) was a German backstroke and breaststroke swimmer who competed in the 1904 Summer Olympics. In the 1904 Olympics he won a gold medal in the 100 yard backstroke and a silver medal in the Men's 440 yard breastroke. He was born and died in Berlin.

== See also ==
- List of members of the International Swimming Hall of Fame
