= Frank Raab (gymnast) =

American ariel flying ring and artistic gymnast

- Full name: Frank Martin Raab
- Born: June 24, 1879 Cambria County, Pennsylvania, U.S.
- Died: August 8, 1940 (aged 61) Altoona, Pennsylvania, U.S.

Gymnastics career
- Discipline: Men's artistic gymnastics Men's ariel flying ring gymnastics
- Country represented: United States

Frank Martin Raab (June 24, 1879 – August 8, 1940) was an American ariel flying ring and artistic gymnast.

== Life and career ==
Raab was born in Cambria County, Pennsylvania, the son of Henry Raab and Kathryn Halen. In his early years, he performed flying ring gymnastics for the Johnstown Turnverein in Johnstown, Pennsylvania.

Raab competed at the 1904 Summer Olympics, competing in three events in gymnastics. After competing at the Olympics, he worked as a machinist for twenty-five years.

== Death ==
Raab died from a heart ailment on August 8, 1940, at his home in Altoona, Pennsylvania, at the age of 61.
