= Garrett Serviss (athlete) =

American high jumper

Olympic medal record

Men's athletics

Representing the United States
| Silver medal – second place | 1904 St Louis | High jump |

Garrett Putnam Serviss Jr. (January 1881 – December 23, 1907) was an American athlete who mostly competed in the high jump. He competed for the United States in the 1904 Summer Olympics held in St. Louis, United States in the high jump, where he won the silver medal. Serviss graduated from Cornell University in 1905. His father was science fiction writer Garrett P. Serviss.
