= Charles Umbs =

American gymnast

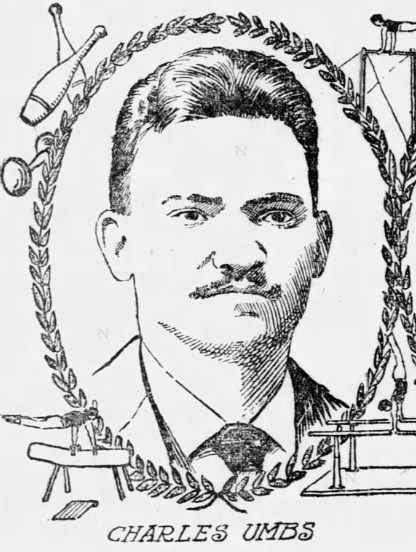

Personal information
- Born: April 29, 1876 Wisconsin, United States
- Died: February 10, 1958 (aged 81) St. Louis, Missouri, United States

Sport
- Sport: Gymnastics

Charles Umbs (April 29, 1876 – February 10, 1958) was an American gymnast. He competed in four events at the 1904 Summer Olympics.
