= Max Rascher =

American gymnast

Personal information
- Nationality: American
- Born: October 29, 1879 Pölitz, Germany
- Died: February 19, 1965 (aged 85) Passaic, New Jersey, United States

Sport
- Sport: Gymnastics

Max Arno Rascher (October 29, 1879 – February 19, 1965) was an American gymnast. He competed in four events at the 1904 Summer Olympics.
