= Reinhard Wagner =

American gymnast

Personal information
- Nationality: American
- Born: November 16, 1876 Zettingen, German Empire
- Died: April 2, 1964 (aged 87) Waterloo, Iowa, United States

Sport
- Sport: Gymnastics

Reinhard Wagner (November 16, 1876 – April 2, 1964) was an American gymnast. He competed in four events at the 1904 Summer Olympics.
