= John Dellert =

American gymnast (1884-1985)

- Born: John Henry Dellert, Jr. November 18, 1884 St. Louis, Missouri, U.S.
- Died: February 3, 1985 (aged 100) Boynton Beach, Florida, U.S.
- Relatives: Charles Dellert (brother)

Gymnastics career
- Discipline: Men's artistic gymnastics
- Country represented: United States
- Gym: Concordia Turnverein

John Henry Dellert, Jr. (November 18, 1884 – February 3, 1985) was an American gymnast who competed at the 1904 Summer Olympics in St. Louis. He participated in three individual events, achieving his best result at the Olympics in the men's triathlon, where he finished 30th in a field of 119 competitors. He was also a part of Concordia Turnverein of St Louis' squad for the men's all-around event, which finished 4th out of 13 nations.

Born in Missouri, he was working as an upholstery installer by the age of 14 to help support his family and trained in gymnastics in his spare time. He was selected to compete in the 1908 Summer Olympics, but injured himself during an exhibition and was forced to withdraw. He stopped participating in tournaments in 1913, but continued his workouts and routines until he was 46. He died in Boynton Beach, Florida at the age of 100. His brother Charles also competed in gymnastics at the same Olympics.
