= John Miesel =

American gymnast

Personal information
- Nationality: American
- Born: February 10, 1883
- Died: October 4, 1948 (aged 65)

Sport
- Sport: Gymnastics

John Miesel (February 10, 1883 – October 4, 1948) was an American gymnast. He competed in the four events at 1904 Summer Olympics.
