= Christian Busch (gymnast) =

German gymnast

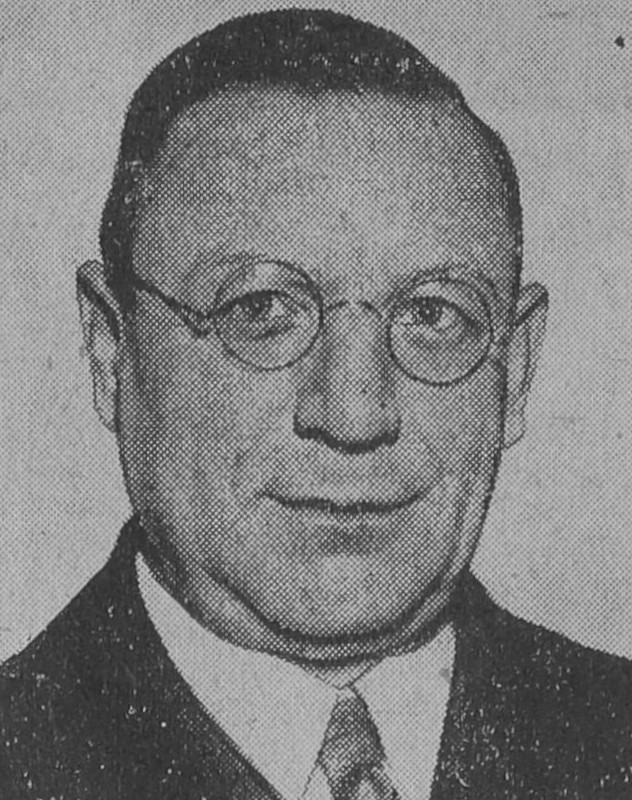
- Full name: Christian Ludwig Busch
- Born: 8 January 1880 Elberfeld, German Empire
- Died: 29 March 1977 (aged 97) Solingen, West Germany

Gymnastics career
- Discipline: Men's artistic gymnastics
- Country represented: Germany
- Gym: Turngemeinde Elberfeld

Christian Ludwig Busch (8 January 1880 – 29 March 1977) was a German gymnast. He competed in three events at the 1904 Summer Olympics.
