= Birger Nilsen (gymnast) =

American gymnast

Personal information
- Nationality: American
- Born: July 23, 1881 Kragerø, Norway
- Died: June 1981 Brooklyn, New York, United States

Sport
- Sport: Gymnastics

Birger Nilsen (July 23, 1881 – June 1981) was an American gymnast. He competed in four events at the 1904 Summer Olympics.
