= George Mayer (gymnast) =

American gymnast

Personal information
- Nationality: American

Sport
- Sport: Gymnastics

George Mayer was an American gymnast. He competed in four events at the 1904 Summer Olympics, winning a bronze medal in the team event.
