= Adolf Spinnler =

Swiss gymnast

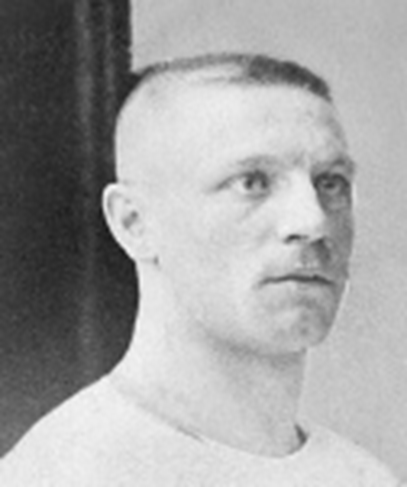
- Spinnler in 1904

Medal record

Men's gymnastics

Representing Germany Turnverein Esslingen

Olympic Games
| Gold medal – first place | 1904 St. Louis | Triathlon |
| Bronze medal – third place | 1904 St. Louis | All-around |

Adolf Spinnler (July 18, 1879 – November 20, 1951) was a Swiss gymnast who competed for the German club 'Turnverein Esslingen' at the 1904 Summer Olympics.

Born in Liestal, Switzerland, he represented the German gymnastics club 'Turnverein Esslingen' at the 1904 Olympic Games. Although Swiss by nationality, the official entry lists identified him as competing for Germany. Spinnler won two medals in gymnastics, gold in the triathlon event and bronze in the individual all-around event.

== Disputed country attribution ==
Spinnler's nationality at the time has been the subject of historical discussion, although the official 1904 Olympic entry lists recorded him as representing Germany. As athletes at the early Olympic Games of 1896, 1900, and 1904 did not compete for their nations in the modern sense, his participation and both medals are currently attributed by the International Olympic Committee (IOC) to Germany, based on the national affiliation of the club under which he competed rather than his nationality.

Since 2024, the IOC has applied this attribution policy consistently to all competitors and events at the Olympic Games between 1896 and 1904, thereby confirming the attribution of Spinnler's two medals to Germany. His case is one of several early Olympic examples in which medal attribution follows club representation instead of the athlete's citizenship.
