= Theodore Gross =

American gymnast (1880–1951)

- Born: February 17, 1880 Louisville, Kentucky, United States
- Died: December 1, 1951 (aged 71) Chicago, Illinois, United States

Gymnastics career
- Discipline: Men's artistic gymnastics

Theodore Gross (February 17, 1880 – December 1, 1951) was an American gymnast. He competed in four events at the 1904 Summer Olympics.

== Biography ==
Gross was an official of the Tribune Athletic association and superintendent of Chicago playgrounds. His career in the city playground system spanned 44 years, ending shortly before his planned retirement on his 72nd birthday.

His professional contributions included timekeeping at the inaugural Tribune Silver Skates derbies in 1917 and the Golden Gloves tournaments starting from 1928.

Gross was married to Alice Gross and they had two children together.
