= Phillip Sontag =

American gymnast

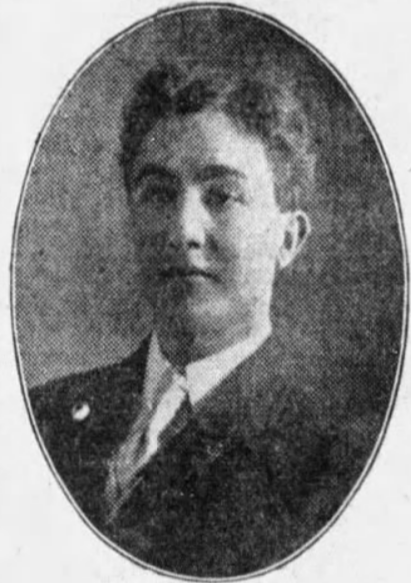

Personal information
- Born: September 26, 1878 Davenport, Iowa, United States
- Died: June 20, 1917 (aged 38) Glendale, California, United States

Sport
- Sport: Gymnastics

Phillip Sontag (September 26, 1878 – June 20, 1917) was an American gymnast. He competed in four events at the 1904 Summer Olympics.
