= Ernst Mohr (gymnast) =

German gymnast

- Full name: Ernst Karl Mohr
- Born: 30 September 1877 Berlin, German Empire
- Died: 18 February 1916 (aged 38) Russian Empire

Gymnastics career
- Discipline: Men's artistic gymnastics
- Country represented: Germany
- Gym: Turngemeinde in Berlin 1848

Ernst Karl Mohr (30 September 1877 – 18 February 1916) was a German gymnast. He competed in three events at the 1904 Summer Olympics. He died in a Russian prisoner of war camp during World War I.
