= Arthur Rosenkampff =

American gymnast

Medal record

Men's gymnastics

Representing the United States

Olympic Games
Silver medal – second place	1904 St Louis	Team

Arthur Henry Rosenkampff (November 3, 1884 – November 6, 1952) was an American gymnast and track and field athlete who competed in the 1904 Summer Olympics. In 1904 he won the silver medal in the team event. He was also 76th in the gymnastics triathlon event, 89th in the gymnastics all-around event, and 102nd in the athletics triathlon event.
