= Fred Schmind =

American athlete-gymnast

Fred Schmind (or Schwind; May 11, 1881 – September 1, 1960) was an American gymnast and athlete who took part in the 1904 Summer Olympics. He represented the club Chicago Central Turnverein.

Schmind took part in the following events in the 1904 Olympics:

- 37th in the gymnastics triathlon
- 22nd place in gymnastics
- 15th place in 100 metres
- 4th place in long jump
- 20th place in the shot put
- 7th place in the athletics triathlon
