= Hugo Peitsch =

German gymnast (1878–1951)

- Full name: Georg Hugo Richard Peitsch
- Born: 21 December 1878; Berlin, German Empire
- Died: 10 September 1951 (aged 72); Manhattan, New York, US
- Height: 1.75 m (5 ft 9 in)

Gymnastics career
- Discipline: Men's artistic gymnastics
- Country represented: Germany
- Club: TV Wedding Berlin

Georg Hugo Richard Peitsch (21 December 1878 – 10 September 1951) was a German gymnast. He competed at the 1900 Summer Olympics and the 1904 Summer Olympics. He moved to the United States following the 1904 Olympics and became a gymnastics teacher in Philadelphia, while continuing to be a gymnast himself. He was said to have gained national prominence in the US for his gymnastic talents, being described as one of the "most outstanding" in the sport in the country.
