= Charles Krause (gymnast) =

American Olympic gymnast

Medal record

Men's Gymnastics

Representing the United States

Olympic Games
Silver medal – second place	1904 St. Louis	Rope climbing
Bronze medal – third place	1904 St. Louis	Team combined exercises

Charles Krause was an American gymnast and Olympic medalist. He competed at the 1904 Summer Olympics in St. Louis where he received a silver medal in rope climbing, and a bronze medal in team combined exercises.
