= Wilhelm Weber (gymnast) =

German gymnast (1880–1963)

- Full name: Ernst Friedrich Wilhelm Weber
- Born: 27 December 1879 Berlin, German Empire
- Died: 28 April 1963 (aged 83) Tornow am Teupitzer See, East Germany

Gymnastics career
- Discipline: Men's artistic gymnastics
- Country represented: Germany
- Gym: Berlin Turnerschaft
Medal record
Men's artistic gymnastics
Representing Germany
Olympic Games
Silver medal – second place	1904 St. Louis	All-around
Bronze medal – third place	1904 St. Louis	Triathlon

Ernst Friedrich Wilhelm Weber (27 December 1879 – 28 April 1963) was a German gymnast who competed in the 1904 Summer Olympics. He won 2 medals, 1 silver and 1 bronze, and participated in three Olympic Games. His first appearance was at St. Louis in 1904.
