= John Solomon (croquet player) =

English croquet player

John William Solomon
- Born: 22 November 1931; Wandsworth, south London
- Died: 20 October 2014 (aged 82); Worthing, West Sussex

John Solomon (22 November 1931 – 20 October 2014) was a croquet player from England.

Solomon dominated English croquet in the 1950s and 1960s winning the President's Cup nine times (1955, 1957, 1958, 1959, 1962, 1963, 1964, 1968 and 1971), the Open Championship ten times (1953, 1956, 1959, 1961, 1963, 1964, 1965, 1966, 1967 and 1968) and the Men's Championship ten times (1951, 1953, 1958, 1959, 1960, 1962, 1964, 1965, 1971 and 1972).

Solomon also won the New Zealand Open Championship in 1951 and 1963.

Solomon represented England and latterly Great Britain in five MacRobertson Shield tournaments, winning on four occasions.

As an administrator Solomon served on the Council of the Croquet Association between 1952 and 2004, serving as Chairman (1962 to 1964), Vice President (1976 to 1982) and President (1982 to 2004).

In 2006 Solomon was inducted into the World Croquet Federation Hall of Fame.

== Career statistics ==
=== Major tournament performance timeline ===
Key
W	F	SF	QF	#R	RR	Q#	DNQ	A	NH

(W) winner; (F) finalist; (SF) semifinalist; (QF) quarterfinalist; (#R) rounds 4, 3, 2, 1; (RR) round-robin stage; (Q#) qualification round; (DNQ) did not qualify; (A) absent; (NH) not held; (SR) strike rate (events won / competed); (W–L) win–loss record.

The President's Cup is played as a 8/10 player round-robin and the number indicates the final position achieved.

Tournament	1951	1952	1953	1954	1955	1956	1957	1958	1959	1960	1961	1962	1963	1964	1965
Open Championship	3R	1R	W	SF	SF	W	A	QF	W	F	W	3R	W	W	W
Men's Championship	W	1R	W	SF	A	SF	A	W	W	W	QF	W	F	W	W
President's Cup	3	2	2	4	W	2	W	W	W	2=	2	W	W	W	4
Win-Loss	7–1	0–2	9–0	4–2	3–1	7–1	0–0	5–1	6–0	8–1	5–1	6–1	9–1	8–0	9–0

Tournament	1966	1967	1968	1969	1970	1971	1972	1973	1974	1975	1976	1977	1978	1996	SR	W–L	Win %
Open Championship	W	W	W	F	3R	3R	SF	SF	3R	SF	A	A	1R	A	10 / 25	78–15	83.9
Men's Championship	F	2R	SF	A	A	W	W	A	A	A	A	A	1R	1R	10 / 20	56–10	84.8
President's Cup	4	3=	W	A	3	W	2	3	2	6	A	A	A	A	9 / 24		
Win-Loss	9–1	6–1	7–1	4–1	1–1	6–1	8–1	3–1	1–1	3–1	0–0	0–0	0–2	0–1	29 / 69	134–25	84.3

=== Major Championship Finals: 26 (22 titles, 4 runners-up) ===
Outcome	Year	Championship	Opponent	Score
Winner	1951	NZ Championship	Arthur Ross	+22, +23
Winner	1951	Men's Championship	Geoffrey Reckitt	+26, +13
Winner	1953	Men's Championship	William Longman	+23, +26
Winner	1953	Open Championship	Humphrey Hicks	+26tp, +26tp
Winner	1956	Open Championship	Humphrey Hicks	+26tp, +24
Winner	1958	Men's Championship	Pat Cotter	+3, -1, +5
Winner	1959	Men's Championship	Pat Cotter	+26, +16
Winner	1959	Open Championship	Humphrey Hicks	+7, +12
Winner	1960	Men's Championship	Dacre Stoker	+18, +21
Runner-up	1960	Open Championship	Hope Rotherham	+26, -15, -8
Winner	1961	Open Championship	Joan Warwick	+12, -3, +12
Winner	1962	Men's Championship	David Prichard	+6, +20
Winner	1963	NZ Championship	William Ormerod	+21, +26
Runner-up	1963	Men's Championship	Pat Cotter	-5, +24, -24
Winner	1963	Open Championship	Pat Cotter	+26, -5, +25
Winner	1964	Men's Championship	Humphrey Hicks	-16, +10, +25
Winner	1964	Open Championship	Dudley Hamilton-Miller	+20, +6
Winner	1965	Men's Championship	Humphrey Hicks	-10, +24, +16
Winner	1965	Open Championship	Humphrey Hicks	+10, +1, +26tp
Runner-up	1966	Men's Championship	Humphrey Hicks	+19, -12, -21
Winner	1966	Open Championship	Hope Rotherham	+25, +16
Winner	1967	Open Championship	Humphrey Hicks	+25tp, +26tp
Winner	1968	Open Championship	Nigel Aspinall	-9, +5, +25
Runner-up	1969	Open Championship	Nigel Aspinall	-19, +13, -4
Winner	1971	Men's Championship	Bill Gladstone	+12, +16
Winner	1972	Men's Championship	Nigel Aspinall	+1, +25

== Works ==
- Croquet (BT Batsford, 1966)
