= William Travers Symons =

William Travers Symons (1879–1976) was an English Social Credit and Christian Socialist writer, known as a member of the Chandos Group and journal editor.

== Early life ==
He was the son of Henry (Harry) James Symons (c.1851–1918), son of Peter Travers Symons of Greenwich, and his wife Charlotte Jean Stewart (c.1854–1922), daughter of Archibald Stewart of Old Kent Road. His father, later of Lee, London, was a broker with Lloyd's of London, a member from 1886. H. J. Symons & Co. still operated from London's Alie Street into the 21st century. William Travers Symons subscribed to Lloyd's in 1914, with H. J. Symons & Co.

Desmond Hawkins wrote that as the son of a marine insurance broker, Symons "had a conventional and reasonably affluent career", but "was unconventional in his sympathies and used his financial strength as a discerning patron of the reformist causes with which he identified himself." He worked for his father's firm from 1893 to 1903. In 1904–5 he was farming in New Zealand. In 1905 he was involved in the Hampstead branch of the Right to Work National Council, as Financial Secretary.

Before the outbreak of World War I, Symons and C. W. Daniel belonged to the Tolstoyan group at Whiteway Colony: Symons was based there from 1905 to 1910. Daniel was a close friend, and Symons later became a director of C. W. Daniel & Co., his publishing house. At this period Symons joined the Independent Labour Party (ILP), and was on good terms with Keir Hardie.

From 1910 to 1915 Symons was working in insurance in Calcutta, India. He returned to England, and subsequently worked in the family firm. He involved himself again with the ILP. He also took up the ideas of A. R. Orage, presented in The New Age, in particular Social Credit.

== 1920s and the Chandos Group ==
Symons wrote later that he first met Orage at a Social Credit conference (Jordans) in 1921. Orage, Symons and Charles Marshall Hattersley, three journalists, were considered the major British publicists of Social Credit ideas. Maurice Reckitt met Symons at the "big [i.e. Swanage] social credit conference" in 1921. That meeting was also attended by Hewlett Johnson. Orage considered it important that the Labour Party should adopt Social Credit. Labour set up a committee to look at it, in 1922; Orage and Social Credit's founder C. H. Douglas refused to deal with it. In October of that year, Orage left the country, and spent the rest of the decade working for the Gurdjieff Foundation.

With the Labour Party in power a few years later, Symons was on the Finance Inquiry set up by the ILP National Council, and in 1925 dissented, with James Maxton, from its first report. The committee, chaired by Clifford Allen, consisted mostly of Members of Parliament, with also E. F. Wise.

At the May 1926 meeting convened by Dimitrije Mitrinović, which founded the Chandos Group, Symons was one of those present. He has been credited as the founder. The Group has also been seen as a branch of the Christendom Movement. The name was taken from the Chandos Restaurant, in central London. It was on St Martin's Lane, and the Group met there regularly, every two weeks. Maurice Reckitt, another of the founders, emerged as its unofficial leader.

Symons agreed with the comment of Reckitt that "finance was openly warring against civilization". He and Reckitt were among the seven authors of Coal: A Challenge to the National Conscience, (1927), an early product of the Group, published by the Hogarth Press.

By 1928, the Chandos Group had allied itself with the Adler Society of London (International Society for Individual Psychology); and the latter developed into the New Europe Group of 1931, another Mitrinović vehicle, which had Patrick Geddes as President. In this way the Chandos Group was linked also to the Sociological Society of Geddes. Symons was treasurer to the Adler Society, and handled day-to-day operations with Rose Graham, wife of Stephen Graham, and Lilian Slade. In 1935, he was also the convenor of the Chandos Group.

== 1930s ==
From 1932, there were in the United Kingdom a variety of local Social Credit organisations, and the National Credit Association set up by Lord Tavistock. In 1933 Gorham Munson described leading British Social Credit publications, including Purpose edited by Symons and Philip Mairet, others being Kibbo Kift's The Front Line, and the British Crusader. That year, in reply to prompting from Symons, C. H. Douglas set up an official Social Credit Secretariat.

In 1934 Orage died, and the Chandos Group set up a committee to find an editor for his New English Weekly. On it were Symons and Reckitt, with T. M. Heron, and Albert Newsome. The result was that Mairet was given the post.

The Labour Party had set its face against Social Credit, from 1922. They did look again, in 1934–5. The Social Credit Secretariat were not interested in dealing with them. Symons, with Mairet and Newsome, attended a meeting at this time with a party subcommittee.

== Works ==
- Compensation or Confiscation? The Speeches of H. Dalton & J. Maxton at the I.L.P. Conference Together with the Speeches of W. Graham & W. T. Symons (1925). With Hugh Dalton, James Maxton and William Graham.
- The Just Price: A Financial Policy for the Independent Labour Party (1926), with Fred Tait.
- A Living Wage Or a Living Income: An Attack Upon the "living Wage" Programme and an Alternative Policy for the Independent Labour Party (1927). A pamphlet critical of the ILP, by Symons who was a "utopian" supporter.
- Coal: A Challenge to the National Conscience (1927). With V. A. Demant, Philippe Mairet, Albert Newsome, Alan Porter, Maurice Reckitt, and Egerton Swann. The work was in the tradition of The British Public and the General Strike (1926) by Kingsley Martin.
- Politics: A Discussion of Realities (1929), a further Chandos Group collective pamphlet. Those mentioned most prominently (James Viner Delahaye and Hilderic Cousens), as well as Mairet, were group members; others involved were Demant, Newsome, Porter, Reckitt and Symons.
- The Coming of Community (1931)

== Editor of Purpose ==
Purpose, a quarterly literary magazine, was set up in 1929 by Charles William Daniel. Initially, he edited it himself, under the pseudonym "John Marlow". By 1930, Symons was running it: with Mairet to 1935, and then with Desmond Hawkins, to 1940.

In 1939, Symons as editor provided space for Henry Miller, whom he had met in 1937 when Miller visited Alfred Perlès in London, to write about the theories of Eric Graham Howe (1897–1975). Miller commented on how much Symons—a "gentleman"—had done, with Claude Houghton's works, to change his ideas on England. Perlès, who stayed with Symons, wrote in his autobiography that there was "something regal" about him.

== Family ==
In 1902, Symons married Margaret (Mary) Ann Williams in Hampstead; she is known as Margaret Travers Symons. The couple had separated by 1906. Margaret filed to divorce her husband in 1910 for his adultery; and the divorce was granted in 1911.
