= Isobel Roe =

British alpine skier (1916–1987)

Isobel Marion Roe
Personal information
- Born: 24 June 1916 Great Britain
- Died: 5 October 1987 (aged 71) Cheltenham, Gloucestershire, England

Skiing career
- Sport: Alpine skiing
- Disciplines: Downhill, Slalom, Combined

Olympics
- Teams: 1 - (1948)

World Championships
- Teams: 2 - Chamonix, 1937; Zakopane, 1939

Isobel Marion Roe (24 June 1916 – 5 October 1987) was an alpine skier, athletic administrator, teacher, and croquet player. As a skier, she was Great Britain Women's Ski Champion and represented Britain in the World Championships in 1937 and the 1948 Winter Olympics in St. Moritz.

== Skiing career ==
Roe gained notoriety in alpine skiing in the years prior to the World War II. She participated in the 1937 Skiing World Championships at Chamonix, France, on 13 February. She finished 10th at 6.47.8. In 1938, she was ranked Great Britain's Women's Ski Champion, a position she would hold throughout the lull during the Second World War, until 1949. In 1939, she again competed in the World Championships, this time in Zakopane, Poland. Roe skied in the Slalom on 15 February, finishing 19th with a time of 375.9, and placed 17th in the Alpine Combined on the same day with a total time of 531.4.

At the height of her career, Roe lost years of competition and training to WWII. Following the conflict, Roe became the Ladies' Lowlander Champion and performed on Great Britain's Winter Olympic Team, both in 1948. She was 31 years of age when she competed in the Alpine Slalom (23rd overall, 2:49.6), Alpine Downhill (27th, 2:47.3), and Alpine Combined (23rd, 34.91) at the 1948 Winter Olympics in St. Moritz, officially known as the V Olympic Winter Games, and the first held since the 1936 Winter Olympics in Bavaria, Germany.

Roe was the captain of the British Ladies' Ski Team at the 1948 Winter Olympics and competed alongside Miss Xanthe Ryder, Miss Rosemarie Sparrow, Mrs. Bunty Greeland, Miss Evelyn Pinching (trainer), Mrs. B. Duke-Woolley, and Miss Sheena Mackintosh.

== Later life ==
Following her career as a competitor, Roe served as the President of Great Britain's Ladies' Ski Club from 1957 to 1960. She founded the Ski Club Reps Course, Junior Championships, and the Schoolgirl Races. The Schoolgirl Races were founded in conjunction with Liz Fulton, and were originally organized for girls in finishing schools in Gstaad, Switzerland. In 1974, Roe was awarded the Pery Medal by the Ski Club of Great Britain, a prize instituted in 1929 and named after Edmond Pery, 5th Earl of Limerick, President of the Ski Club, 1925–1927. Another noteworthy achievement, achieved far later in her career as an athlete, came when she won the Women's Championship of The Croquet Association in 1961, defeating Joan Warwick in the final, - 18, +2, +6. Today, players at the Cheltenham Croquet Club still compete for a tournament award called the Isobel Roe Trophy. Roe taught physical education in Cheltenham during this latter part of her life, as well as having cared for her elderly father, Commander R. C. T. Roe, a longtime secretary of the PGA and manager of Great Britain's Ryder Cup squads from 1935 through 1955.

Just before her death, Roe appeared in the 1986 edition of The Guinness Book of Records in the category of Most Tiles Held, Women's Skiing, Great Britain. Roe died in 1987 in Cheltenham, Gloucestershire, Great Britain.
