= Evelyn Pinching =

British alpine skier

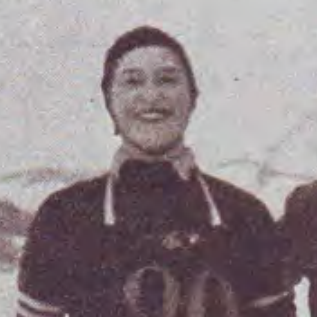
- Evelyn "Evie" Pinching c.1939

Medal record

Women's Alpine skiing

Representing United Kingdom

World Championships
Gold medal – first place	1936 Innsbruck	Downhill
Gold medal – first place	1936 Innsbruck	Combined
Silver medal – second place	1936 Innsbruck	Slalom

Evelyn Amie "Evie" Pinching (18 March 1915 – 24 December 1988) was a British alpine skier, born in Norwich, who won the 1936 women's downhill and combined events in the FIS Alpine World Ski Championships in Innsbruck, Austria. She also competed in the 1936 Winter Olympics, where she finished ninth in the alpine skiing combined. In 1937 Pinching won the Hahnenkamm downhill in Kitzbühel.

== FIS Alpine World Ski Championships 1936 ==
Pinching competed at the FIS Alpine World Ski Championships 1936, colloquially referred to as Innsbruck for the location where it was held. In the greatest showing of her sports career, Pinching became double gold medalist, winning both the downhill and combined; as well as taking him the silver medal in the slalom.

== 1936 & 1948 Winter Olympics ==
Representing Great Britain in the 1936 Winter Olympics, Pinching finished ninth place in the alpine skiing combined.

Pinching served as the head coach for the British Ladies' Ski Team at the 1948 Winter Olympics which consisted of Miss Isobel Roe, Miss Xanthe Ryder, Miss Sheena Mackintosh, Miss Rosemarie Sparrow, Mrs. Bunty Greeland, and Mrs. Biddy Duke-Woolley.

== Evie Pinching Award ==
The Evie Pinching Award is an annual prize organised by the Ski Club of Great Britain given to an athlete aged 24 or under considered 'one to watch' in their snowsports discipline.

The athletes are nominated by the sport's UK national governing bodies, Snowsport England, Snowsport Scotland, Snowsport Wales, Disability Snowsport UK and British Ski and Snowboarding – with a shortlist of then chosen by the Ski Club. This shortlist is then open to public vote. The winner receives a £1,000 bursary and training opportunities with elite athletes.

Past winners: Katie Ormerod (2015), Menna Fitzpatrick (2016), and Thomas Gerken-Schofield (2017).
