= John Prince (croquet player) =

New Zealand croquet player (1945–2023)

John Prince MNZM
Personal information
- Born: John Graham Prince; 23 July 1945 Lower Hutt, New Zealand
- Died: 14 February 2023 (aged 77)

Sport
- Country: New Zealand
- Sport: Croquet

Achievements and titles
- National finals: 37 New Zealand titles

John Graham Prince MNZM (23 July 1945 – 14 February 2023) was a New Zealand croquet player. He represented New Zealand over a period of 40 years, from 1963 to 2003, and was the first player to appear in 100 MacRobertson Shield matches. He won 37 New Zealand national croquet titles, and in 1970 became the first player to execute a sextuple peel in competition. He was inducted into the World Croquet Federation Hall of Fame in 2007.

== Early life ==
Born in Lower Hutt on 23 July 1945, Prince was the son of Stanley Graham Prince and Elsie Cecilia Drummond. He started playing croquet at the Naenae Croquet Club in Lower Hutt in 1959, and was initially coached by Ashley Heenan.

== Croquet career ==
=== Playing career ===
Prince was a surprise selection at the age of 17 in the New Zealand team for the 1963 MacRobertson International Croquet Shield where he beat John Solomon, regarded as the world's best player at the time, in the test match against England. He captained the New Zealand MacRobertson Shield team for the first time in 1969. Prince would go on to represent New Zealand in nine campaigns, the last time in 2003, and managed the team on another occasion. He captained the team on five occasions including two MacRobertson Shield wins in 1979 in New Zealand and in 1986 in Great Britain. Prince set three MacRobertson Shield world records by being the youngest player to compete, by playing in nine series, and by becoming the first player to play 100 matches.

Prince won 37 national titles including the New Zealand Open title eight times (in 1967, 1968, 1969, 1971, 1976, 1977, 1987 and 2002), the New Zealand doubles title 11 times, the New Zealand men's title 10 times (in 1963, 1964, 1966, 1967, 1968, 1969, 1970, 1971, 1972 and 1999) and the Best Ten or Eight title eight times (in 1964, 1967, 1969, 1970, 1973, 1974, 1983 and 1997).

On 30 March 1970, Prince became the first player to complete a sextuple peel in a competition during the final of the Hawke's Bay Easter Invitation.

Prince won the British Open Doubles Championship with Gordon Rowling in 1974.

=== Administrative roles ===
Prince served in a number of different roles on the New Zealand Croquet Council. He was a selector of domestic and international teams, and was involved in arranging tournament formats and formulating tournament conditions.

== Honours and awards ==
Prince was a member of the Rangatira Croquet Club in Dannevirke and a life member of the United Croquet Club in Christchurch, the Canterbury Croquet Association and Croquet New Zealand. He was also made an honorary life member of the Croquet Association in England.

Prince was named Hawke's Bay Sportsperson of the Year in 1986.

In the 2000 New Year Honours, Prince was appointed a Member of the New Zealand Order of Merit, for services to croquet. He was inducted into the World Croquet Federation Hall of Fame in 2007, and is also an inductee to the Croquet New Zealand Hall of Fame.

== Books ==
A talented artist, Prince provided illustrations for the Croquet New Zealand publication Approaching Croquet and later wrote and illustrated Practice with a Purpose: A Self Help Guide to Better Croquet. A set of supplementary booklets written by Prince and published by Croquet New Zealand include:

- Fun Games for Croquet
- Playing the Four Ball Break
- Standard Leaves
- The Delayed and Straight Triple Peel
- The Standard Opening and Variations for Championship Play

Prince made contributions to and created artwork for Play Better Croquet: An Introduction to Today's Game by Geoffrey Naylor which was published by Hazard Press.

== Death and legacy ==
Prince died on 14 February 2023, at the age of 77. The John Prince Trophy, awarded to the runner-up in the New Zealand Open, is named in his honour.
