= Patrick Cotter =

Patrick Cotter may refer to:

- Patrick Cotter O'Brien (1760–1806), Irish giant
- Patrick Cotter (croquet player) (1904–1996), croquet player from Ireland
- Patrick Cotter (poet) (born 1963), Irish poet
- Patrick Cotter (priest) (1914–2007), Australian priest
