= Nina Coote =

English-born Irish croquet player

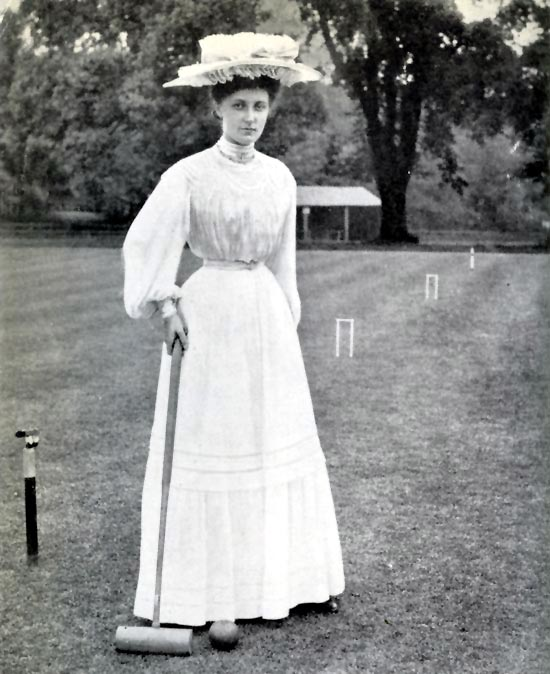
- Coote in 1906
- Born: 23 September 1883; Tunbridge Wells, Kent, England
- Died: 6 January 1945 (aged 61); Roehampton, London

Nina Edith Coote (23 September 1883 – 6 January 1945) was an Irish croquet player.

== Early life and family ==
Nina Edith Coote was born in Tunbridge Wells, Kent, England, on 23 September 1883. She was the only child of Orlando Robert Coote (1855–1927) and Edith Mary (née Hume) (1858/9–1920). Her father was a land agent and the third son of Revd. Sir Algernon Coote, 11th Baronet, clergyman, and landowner, of Ballyfin House, Mountrath, County Laois. Orlando Coote was most likely educated in England, was a keen sportsman, and was involved in early sports administration in Ireland and Britain in the late 19th century. He was a founder member of the Athlone Association Football Club, a soccer club in Castlerea, County Roscommon, and the Athlone Garden Vale Hockey Club. He was also involved in golf, tennis, cycling, rowing, and yachting. Coote and her family had moved to Bunnavally, County Westmeath, near Athlone, by 1901.

== Croquet career ==
Coote began playing croquet at an early age, discovering a natural talent for it. She was a member of the Garden Vale Tennis and Croquet Club in Athlone, winning the South of Ireland croquet championship in 1901 and 1902. In 1903, she lost the semi-final croquet championship of Ireland to the winner, Mrs. Edith Preston. She went on to play in the 1903 English ladies’ open championship at Wimbledon, defeating Preston in the final. She won the English ladies’ open championship again in 1905 and also won the mixed doubles with Cyril Corbally. She won the 1905 Irish gold medals for croquet and the gold caskets. She defeated Lily Gower in 1904; at the time, Gower was considered to be the best croquet player, male or female. She tied with Gower for seventh place in the 1905 Champions’ Cup, playing against both men and women. In 1906 and 1907, she ranked ninth in the cup competition. Following in Gower's footsteps, Coote won the 1908 men's gold medal. This led to the rules being changed to forbid women from entering that competition. When the Ladies’ Champion Cup held its inaugural competition in 1911, Coote came third.

Coote's croquet playing style relied more on speed than accuracy. She was known for her fast-paced gaming, completing games in record times using a golf-style side-swing. Her game-playing form was at times brilliant but often erratic, allowing for more consistent players like Gower to dominate the competitions. Coote was known for her lively personality and her sharp and caustic wit.

== Later life and death ==
Coote retired from playing after World War I, and went on to successfully manage a number of croquet teams. She was noted for her firm and unwavering managerial style. After a failed love affair in 1936, Coote gradually withdrew from public life and became reclusive. She began to practice spiritualism and became certain that she would die at the age of 61. She became increasingly eccentric, delaying a minor surgery until her condition became more dangerous. She died in Roehampton, London, on 6 January 1945 from complications from that surgery.
