= Xanthe Ryder =

British alpine skier

Personal information
- National team: Great Britain
- Born: 15 May 1926 London, England
- Died: 1 January 1998 (aged 71) London, England
- Education: St Hugh’s College, Oxford
- Spouse: Michael de Lauret Dalglish

Sport
- Sport: Alpine skiing

Achievements and titles
- Highest world ranking: 27th, 1948 Winter Olympics, (Alpine skiing combined)

Xanthe Veronica Dalglish (née Ryder) (15 May 1926 – 1 January 1998), wife of Michael de Lauret Dalglish, was a British alpine skier who competed under the name Xanthe Ryder in two events at the 1948 Winter Olympics.

== Family background ==
Xanthe Veronica Ryder was the middle daughter of British peer Major Algernon Frederick Roland Dudley Ryder and his French-Canadian wife Edythe Olive Baillie. Her elder sister was Dione Frances Ryder (b.1924) and younger sister was Charis Elizabeth Ryder (b.1930).

== 1948 Winter Olympics ==
After finishing third in the slalom at the Flatlander’s Championship at Mürren in January 1948, Ryder was selected for the Great Britain team in February of the same year.

Ryder competed in the 1948 Winter Olympics, St Moritz, for Team Great Britain under the number 82238 in two events: Alpine skiing combined and Alpine skiing downhill. Ryder finished 27th in Alpine Skiing (Combined) and 34th in Alpine Skiing (Downhill).

In addition to Ryder, the British Ladies' Olympic Ski Team was composed of Miss Rosemarie Sparrow, Mrs. Bunty Greeland, Miss Evelyn Pinching (trainer), Mrs. Biddy Duke-Woolley, Miss Isobel Roe and Miss Sheena Mackintosh. The team's captain Miss Isobel Roe, a close friend of Ryder's, would go on to receive the Pery Medal by the Ski Club of Great Britain.

== Marriage ==
Ryder married Michael de Lauret Dalglish on 27 April 1949 at the Brompton Oratory, followed by a reception in Mayfair, London. Notable attendees at the wedding were covered in Tatler and included her husband's aunt and uncle: Elinor Clare Millais (née Macdonell) and British painter Raoul Millais.

Ryder and Dalglish had three children: James Thomas Macdonell Dalglish (b.1950), Charles Baillie Dalglish (b.1953), and Clare Mary Dalglish (b.1956).
