= Bernard Neal =

- Born: Bernard George Neal; 29 March 1922; Hendon, England
- Died: 26 March 2016 (aged 93); Cheltenham, England
- Spouse: Elizabeth (m. 1948)

Bernard George Neal (29 March 1922 – 26 March 2016) was a professor of structural engineering at Imperial College London and the winner of the All England croquet championship on 38 occasions.

== Croquet ==
Bernard Neal won the Open Championship twice (1972 and 1973) and the Men's Championship in 1967.

Neal represented England and latterly Great Britain in three MacRobertson Shield tournaments, winning on two occasions.

As an administrator, Neal served on the Council of the Croquet Association from 1966 to 2009, serving as Chairman (1972 to 1974), Vice President (1996 to 2004) and President (2004 to 2009).

In 2010, Neal was inducted into the World Croquet Federation Hall of Fame.

== Career statistics ==
=== Major tournament performance timeline ===
Key
W	F	SF	QF	#R	RR	Q#	DNQ	A	NH

(W) winner; (F) finalist; (SF) semifinalist; (QF) quarterfinalist; (#R) rounds 4, 3, 2, 1; (RR) round-robin stage; (Q#) qualification round; (DNQ) did not qualify; (A) absent; (NH) not held; (SR) strike rate (events won / competed); (W–L) win–loss record.

The President's Cup is played as a 8/10 player round-robin and the number indicates the final position achieved.

Tournament	1965	1966	1967	1968	1969	1970	1971	1972	1973	1974	1975	1976	1977	1978	1979	1980
Open Championship	2R	2R	SF	SF	SF	QF	SF	W	W	QF	SF	QF	3R	3R	F	SF
Men's Championship	2R	2R	W	QF	QF	QF	A	2R	F	A	A	A	A	SF	SF	2R
President's Cup	A	A	7=	4=	6	A	4=	5=	A	A	3=	A	7	4=	2	7

Tournament	1981	1982	1983	1984	1985	1986	1987	1988	1989	1990	1991	1992	1993	1994	1995
Open Championship	1R	QF	1R	2R	A	1R	3R	1R	A	A	2R	1R	1R	A	A
Men's Championship	1R	2R	A	A	1R	QF	A	SF	A	A	QF	A	1R	A	1R
President's Cup	A	8	A	A	A	A	A	A	A	A	A	A	A	A	A

Tournament	1996	1997	1998	1999	2000	2001	2002	2003	2004	2005	2006	2007
Open Championship	A	A	A	A	A	A	A	A	A	A	A	A
Men's Championship	A	1R	1R	1R	2R	1R	1R	A	A	1R	A	2R
President's Cup	A	A	A	A	A	A	A	A	A	A	A	A

== Academic ==
He was elected to the fellowship of The Royal Academy of Engineering in 1980.

== Selected publications ==
- Structures and the applied scientist. University College of Swansea, Swansea, 1955.
- The plastic methods of structural analysis. Chapman & Hall, 1956.
- Structural theorems and their applications. Pergamon Press, Oxford, 1964. (Commonwealth and International Library)
