= Gail Curry =

English croquet player

Gail Curry is a six time English croquet champion. She is believed to be the first woman croquet player to have achieved a sextuple peel. She was editor of the Croquet Association's magazine The Croquet Gazette for six years.
