= Keith Wylie =

English croquet player

Keith Francis Wylie
- Born: 29 March 1945
- Died: 1 November 1999 (aged 54)

Keith Francis Wylie (29 March 1945 – 1 November 1999) was a croquet player from England.

Keith Wylie won the President's Cup twice (1967 and 1977), the Open Championship twice (1970 and 1971) and the Men's Championship in 1968. Wylie represented Great Britain in two MacRobertson Shield tournaments, winning on both occasions.

In 1985, Wylie wrote the definitive book on Croquet Tactics with a second edition appearing in 1991. In 2008, Wylie was inducted into the World Croquet Federation Hall of Fame.

== Career statistics ==
=== Major tournament performance timeline ===
Key
W	F	SF	QF	#R	RR	Q#	DNQ	A	NH

(W) winner; (F) finalist; (SF) semifinalist; (QF) quarterfinalist; (#R) rounds 4, 3, 2, 1; (RR) round-robin stage; (Q#) qualification round; (DNQ) did not qualify; (A) absent; (NH) not held; (SR) strike rate (events won / competed); (W–L) win–loss record.

The President's Cup is played as a 8/10 player round-robin and the number indicates the final position achieved.

Tournament	1966	1967	1968	1969	1970	1971	1972	1973	1974	1975	1976	1977	1978	1979	1980	1981	1982	1983	1984	1985	1986	1987	1988	1989
Open Championship	QF	QF	2R	A	W	W	SF	F	1R	3R	A	3R	QF	A	A	A	A	A	A	A	A	1R	A	1R
Men's Championship	A	A	W	A	A	A	A	A	QF	A	A	A	A	A	A	A	F	A	A	A	A	A	A	A
President's Cup	A	W	A	3=	4	A	5=	A	7=	A	3=	W	A	A	A	A	A	A	6	A	A	A	A	A

== Works ==
- Expert Croquet Tactics (KF Wylie, 1985).
- Expert Croquet Tactics (Eastern Rose Publishing, 1991). ISBN 1874135002.
