= Humphrey Hicks =

English croquet player

Humphrey Osmond Hicks
- Born: 20 May 1904; Esher, Surrey
- Died: 9 June 1986 (aged 82); Sidmouth, Devon

Humphrey Osmond Hicks (20 May 1904 - 9 June 1986) was a croquet player from England.

Hicks won the President's Cup six times (1930, 1947, 1948, 1951, 1954 and 1961), the Open Championship seven times (1932 1939, 1947, 1948, 1949, 1950 and 1952) and the Men's Championship nine times (1930, 1932, 1948, 1949, 1950, 1955, 1956, 1961 and 1966).

Hicks represented England in three MacRobertson Shield tournaments, winning on two occasions.

In 2008 Hicks was inducted into the World Croquet Federation Hall of Fame.

== Career statistics ==
=== Major tournament performance timeline ===
Tournament	1928	1929	1930	1931	1932	1933	1934	1935	1936	1937	1938	1939
Open Championship	QF	SF	F	2R	W	2R	2R	2R	A	3R	A	W
Men's Championship	SF	F	W	SF	W	2R	A	A	1R	A	A	A
Champion Cup	8=	5	W	A	7	A	A	A	A	A	A	NH^{*}
Win-loss	5–2	6–2	9–1	3–2	10–0	1–2	0–1	1–1	0–1	2–1	0–0	6–0

Tournament	1946	1947	1948	1949	1950	1951	1952	1953	1954	1955	1956	1957	1958	1959
Open Championship	SF	W	W	W	W	SF	W	F	1R	2R	F	SF	SF	F
Men's Championship	A	QF	W	W	W	2R	A	A	A	A	W	W	A	A
President's Cup	A	W	W	2	A	W	3	A	W	A	A	A	2	2
Win-loss	2–1	6–1	9–0	9–0	10–0	3–2	5–0	4–1	0–1	1–1	8–1	7–1	2–1	3–1

Tournament	1960	1961	1962	1963	1964	1965	1966	1967	1968	1969	1970	1971	1972	1973	1974
Open Championship	QF	SF	1R	SF	1R	F	2R	F	1R	A	A	1R	QF	QF	3R
Men's Championship	A	W	SF	A	F	F	W	A	2R	A	A	A	2R	2R	1R
President's Cup	4	W	3=	A	4=	A	A	A	A	A	A	A	A	A	A
Win-loss	2–1	7–1	2–1	2–1	3–2	6–2	5–1	5–1	0–2	0–0	0–0	0–1	3–2	3–2	1–2

Tournament	1975	1976	1977	1978	1979	1980	1981	1982	1983	1984	SR	W–L	Win %
Open Championship	2R	1R	3R	2R	2R	1R	A	A	2R	1R	7 / 45	95–38	71.4
Men's Championship	A	A	A	2R	1R	QF	A	A	A	A	9 / 26	61–16	79.2
President's Cup	A	A	A	A	A	A	A	A	A	A	6 / 16		
Win-loss	1–1	0–1	1–1	1–2	0–2	1–2	0–0	0–0	1–1	0–1	22 / 87	156–54	74.3

^{*} not held because of outbreak of World War 2.

Key
W	F	SF	QF	#R	RR	Q#	DNQ	A	NH

(W) winner; (F) finalist; (SF) semifinalist; (QF) quarterfinalist; (#R) rounds 4, 3, 2, 1; (RR) round-robin stage; (Q#) qualification round; (DNQ) did not qualify; (A) absent; (NH) not held; (SR) strike rate (events won / competed); (W–L) win–loss record.

The Champion Cup/President's Cup is played as a 8/10 player round-robin and the number indicates the final position achieved.

The Champion Cup was won outright by Miss DD Steel in 1933 and was replaced by the President's Cup. Until 1938 ten players played in the event. Since then eight have played.
