= Duff Mathews =

Irish croquet player (1886 – 1958)

- Born: 19 December 1886; Duleek, County Meath
- Died: 22 May 1958 (aged 71); Drogheda
- Occupation(s): Farmer, Croquet player

Patrick Duff Mathews (19 December 1886 – 22 May 1958) was a croquet player from Ireland.

Duff Mathews won the Croquet Championship four times (1914, 1919, 1920 and 1927) and the premier selection event, the Champion Cup, now called the President's Cup, in 1912.

Mathews won the Championship of Ireland ten times between 1939 and 1953 and shared the title with New Zealand's Bill Kirk in 1954. He won the Open doubles Championship in 1925 partnering Trevor Williams.

Mathews represented England in the 1925 MacRobertson Shield tournament in England.

During the first World War, Mathews served with the Connaught Rangers and rose to the rank of Captain.
