= Philip Mairet =

English designer, writer and journalist (1886–1975)

Philip Mairet (French: [mɛʁɛ]; full name: Philippe Auguste Mairet; 27 April 1886 – 9 February 1975) was a British designer, writer and journalist. He had a wide range of interest: crafts, Alfred Adler and psychiatry, and Social Credit. He translated major figures including Jean-Paul Sartre. He wrote biographies of Sir Patrick Geddes and A. R. Orage, with both of whom he was closely associated, as well as of John Middleton Murry. As editor of the New English Weekly in the 1930s, he championed both Christian socialism, as it was known at the time, and ideas on agriculture that would come together later as organic farming.

== Early life ==
He was born in Islington, London, on 27 April 1886, the son of Charles Sylvain Mairet, a Swiss watchmaker, and his wife Mary Ann Goldsmith. He was educated at a board school and the Stationers' Company's School.

Mairet studied at the Hornsey School of Art, becoming a draughtsman and designer of stained glass. Failing to enter the Royal Academy Schools, he took a job in advertising. He went to work in graphic design for Charles Robert Ashbee and joined his Arts and Crafts community at Chipping Campden.

== Marriage, Mitrinović and Ditchling ==
Mairet married in 1913, and with his wife Ethel Mary Partridge moved away from Chipping Campden. They lived in a cottage at Shottery: Ethel worked as a weaver, and Mairet for Burlison and Grylls. In 1914 Mairet met and was influenced by Dimitrije Mitrinović, attached to the Serbian Delegation. In the summer of 1915 he prepared wall lecture diagrams for a summer course on The War: Its Social Tasks and Problems at King's College, London. The course was given by Patrick Geddes and Gilbert Slater.

At the end of 1915 Mairet joined the Red Cross Society. In An Autobiographical Compilation, he described his time serving in the Red Cross personnel in France, and catching up with Mitrinović when on leave in England. In 1917 he had a revelatory experience, after which he described himself as a disciple, and resigned from the Red Cross.

Mairet and his wife moved to Ditchling, Sussex, where they settled. Mairet took on work as an agricultural labourer, on the farm that Hilary Pepler and his wife had bought on the edge of Ditchling Common. In so doing, Mairet was avoiding conscripted military service. Eventually he was discovered, and enrolled in the Royal Sussex Regiment. He was sentenced by a court-martial having refused to obey orders, and spent a period in Wormwood Scrubs as a conscientious objector. He was released in 1919, and returned to Ditchling where Ethel was a successful weaver; there Mitrinović visited.

From 1921 to 1924 Mairet worked as an actor at the Old Vic. In 1926 he turned to journalism.

== The New English Weekly circle ==
Mairet began going to the editorial meetings of A. R. Orage after World War I, where the so-called New Age circle attended, The New Age being Orage's magazine. In 1922 Orage quit as its editor, going abroad to study at and work in the Gurdjieff Institute. From 1930 to 1934, Mairet edited with W. Travers Symons Purpose, a quarterly magazine founded in 1929, mixing Social Credit ideas with Alfred Adler's. In 1930 Orage was rebuffed when he offered to return to The New Age, by the controlling Anglicans who now ran it, known as the "Chandos Group", who were Christian socialists.

During the 1930s, there were changes in Mairet's life. His marriage broke down; he threw off the influence of Mitrinović; and he changed the spelling of his first name from Philippe to Philip. Orage set up the New English Weekly in 1932. He died suddenly in 1934, leaving the publication in limbo. The editorial line, as legacy from Orage, was Social Credit in the sense of the Economic Freedom League, a faction led by H. E. B. Ludlam; and approval of Oswald Mosley.

Mairet, in 1934 the literary editor of the New English Weekly, emerged as its editor as a compromise candidate. One group of Social Credit advocates wanted to exclude another group, of supporters of Mitrinović. Mairet was identified more with a third force, the Chandos Group. They took their name from the Chandos Restaurant in St Martin's Lane, where they met.

The Chandos Group overlapped the Mitrinović group: there had been a shared interest in the journal Purpose; and the theories of Adler were also a common factor. W. Travers Symons introduced Mairet to T. S. Eliot, who was holding the ring. In practical terms the Chandos Group were already deeply involved in producing the New English Weekly, and were sympathetic to Social Credit.

== Associations ==
The Chandos group was founded by Mitrinović, meeting for the first time on the last day of the 1926 General Strike. It later centred on Maurice Reckitt, with Mairet, W. Travers Symons, V. A. Demant, and Alan Porter. Albert Newsome, Alan Porter and Egerton Swan attended, while working up Coal: A Challenge to the National Conscience. Others were B. T. Boothroyd, Hilderic Edwin Cousens, Geoffrey Davis the Distributist, and R. S. J. Rand. G. D. H. Cole, T. S. Eliot and Lewis Mumford were occasionally at the meetings, which occurred once every two weeks.

Mairet belonged to other small societies and discussion groups of the period before World War II. Those included Oldham's Moot. Mairet wrote a piece "The Gospel, Drama, and Society" for Oldham's Christian News-Letter series; Pepler wrote a reply to it on "training the imagination".

Mairet was an early supporter of George Orwell, who wrote to the New English Weekly in May 1932, and was given a book by Karl Adam to review. He wrote in positive and comprehending terms about Homage to Catalonia and Orwell's approach. He was a friend and long-time correspondent of T. S. Eliot, who dedicated his Notes towards the Definition of Culture to him. The work's title harked back to a seminar series Eliot and Mairet had run in the winter 1943/4, at St Anne's House, under the title "Towards the Definition of a Culture". The House was attached to St Anne's Church, Soho, bombed out in two air raids in autumn 1940.

In December 1938 the magazine New Pioneer was launched, a far right publication associated with Viscount Lymington. Mairet was one of the group of its supporters, with John Beckett, Ben Greene, Anthony Ludovici and many of those who formed the British People's Party (1939) shortly afterwards. He joined Rolf Gardiner's Kinship in Husbandry group in 1941.

For Walter Moberly's Christian Frontier Council, Mairet edited The Frontier (1951). Also for the Christian Frontier Council, he organised a symposium Christianity and Psychiatry, and edited its proceedings as Christian Essays in Psychiatry (1956).

Brian Harrison recorded an oral history interview with Mairet, in May 1974, as part of the Suffrage Interviews project, titled Oral evidence on the suffragette and suffragist movements: the Brian Harrison interviews. Mairet talks about his introduction to women's suffrage, the WSPU and Maude Royden.

== Works ==
Mairet did the drawings for Ashbee's re-design of the Norman Chapel House in Broad Campden, and the 1907 commission for Thomas Shaw-Hellier's Villa San Giorgio in Taormina. Fiona MacCarthy, the biographer of the architect, judges it "the most impressive of Ashbee's remaining buildings"; it survives as the Hotel Ashbee. Mairet also illustrated Ashbee's Conradin: A Philosophical Ballad (1908).

=== Biography ===
- A. R. Orage: a memoir (1936)
- Pioneer of Sociology: The Life and Letters of Patrick Geddes (1957)
- John Middleton Murry (1958)

=== Essays and pamphlets ===
- An essay on crafts & obedience (1918), with Hilary Pepler
- The Idea Behind Craftsmanship (1928)
- Aristocracy and the Meaning of Class Rule – An Essay upon Aristocracy Past and Future (1931)
- The Frontier (1951)
- Christian Essays in Psychiatry (1956) editor

=== Social Credit ===
- The Douglas Manual: Being a Recension of Passages from the Works of Major C. H. Douglas, Outlining Social Credit (Stanley Nott, 1934) editor

=== Alfred Adler ===
- ABC of Adler's psychology (1928)
- Alfred Adler Problems of Neurosis (1929) editor, case histories

=== Translations ===
Mairet's numerous translations to English included L'existentialisme est un humanisme by Jean-Paul Sartre, and Calvin by François Wendel (1905–1972).

== Family ==
The woman Mairet married, Ethel Mary Partridge, was an influential hand loom weaver and teacher. She was born in 1872 and, in 1903, married Ananda Coomaraswamy, the geologist and art historian. Mairet worked on their house and became Coomaraswamy's secretary. The Coomaraswamy marriage broke down, and the couple divorced in 1910.
