= Dudley Hamilton-Miller =

English croquet player

Dudley James Vincent Hamilton-Miller
- Born: 28 March 1903; Paddington, London
- Died: 15 July 1984 (aged 81); Kingston upon Thames, London

Dudley James Vincent Hamilton-Miller (28 March 1903 – 15 July 1984) was a croquet player from England.

Dudley Hamilton-Miller won the Open Championship twice (1938 and 1946) and the President's Cup once in 1946. As an administrator, Hamilton-Miller served on the Council of the Croquet Association between 1966 and 1983. Hamilton-Miller represented England in the 1950–51 MacRobertson Shield tournament in New Zealand.
