= Grace Davie =

British sociologist

- Born: 2 September 1946 (age 80)
- Other name: Grace Riestra Claire Davie

Academic background
- Education: University of Exeter; London School of Economics
- Thesis: Right Wing Politics Among French Protestants, 1900–1944 (1975)

Academic work
- Discipline: Sociology
- Sub-discipline: Sociology of religion
- Institutions: University of Exeter
- Notable works: Religion in Britain Since 1945 (1994)

Grace Riestra Claire Davie (born 1946) is a British sociologist who serves as professor emeritus of sociology at the University of Exeter. She is the author of the book Religion in Britain Since 1945: Believing Without Belonging.

== Academic background ==
Born on 2 September 1946, Davie has an undergraduate degree in sociology from the University of Exeter, and a PhD from the London School of Economics. From 2000 to 2001 she was the Kerstin-Hesselgren Professor at the University of Uppsala in Sweden. She was awarded an Honorary Doctorate in Theology from the University of Uppsala in 2008.

Davie is Past-President of the Association for the Sociology of Religion (2003) and the International Sociological Association RC22 Sociology of Religion Board (2002–2006).

Davie is a participating researcher in The Impact of Religion: Challenges for Society, Law and Democracy (IMPACT), a multidisciplinary research programme at Uppsala University, in the research area Religious and Social Change.

Davie is a lay canon of the Church of England Diocese in Europe.

== Works ==
Davie has written several works during her career, including Religion in Britain since 1945 (1994), Religion in Modern Europe (2000), Europe: the Exceptional Case (2002), The Sociology of Religion (2013) and Religion in Britain: A Persistent Paradox (2015).

Davie's research interests lie in the sociology of religion. In her book Religion in Britain Since 1945, she coined the phrase "believing without belonging" to describe religiosity and secularization in Britain. This is the argument that although church attendance has decreased, people may still think of themselves as religious on an individual level.

With this and other works, Davie entered the international ongoing debate on secularization, after Rodney Stark and other American scholars had observed that quantitative data about the United States did not confirm the theory defended in Europe by Karel Dobbelaere and Steve Bruce, implying that modernization necessarily causes a decline of religion. European defenders of secularization theories suggested that an "American exceptionalism" explained why a generally valid hypothesis did not apply to the United States, due to some unique circumstances prevailing there. Davie reversed this theory, and suggested the existence of a "European exceptionalism", explaining why classic secularization theories are valid in Europe but cannot be verified in the rest of the world.

To explain European exceptionalism, Davie introduced yet another new concept, "vicarious religion", meaning that modern Europeans are happy to "delegate" to a minority of active believers participation in regular church activities, something they approve of but are no longer ready to engage in. This theory was also criticized by those who adhere to classic theories of secularization, who claimed that a generalized sympathy for the religious minority among the non-religious majority cannot be unequivocally demonstrated.

== Publications ==
- Religion in Britain Since 1945: Believing Without Belonging (1994) ISBN 978-0631184447
- Religion in Modern Europe: A Memory Mutates (2000) ISBN 978-0199241248
- Europe-The Exceptional Case: Parameters of Faith in the Modern World Sarum Theological Lectures (2002) ISBN 978-0232524253
- The Sociology of Religion: A Critical Agenda (2007; 2nd edn. 2013) ISBN 978-1849205870
- Religion in Britain: A Persistent Paradox (2015) ISBN 978-1405135962

Other offices
| Preceded by Frank Field | Scott Holland Memorial Lecturer; 2014 | Succeeded by Stephen Spencer |
