= Come, Ye Thankful People, Come =

English Christian harvest festival hymn

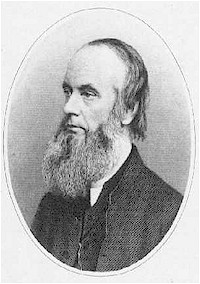
- Henry Alford
- Genre: Hymn
- Written: 1844
- Text: Henry Alford
- Based on: Psalm 100:4
- Meter: 7.7.7.7 D
- Melody: "St. George's Windsor" by George Job Elvey

"Come, Ye Thankful People, Come" is an English Christian harvest festival hymn written in 1844 by Henry Alford. It is most often sung to the tune St. George's Windsor by George Job Elvey.

== History ==
Alford wrote "Come, Ye Thankful People, Come" in 1844 while he was rector of Aston Sandford in Buckinghamshire, England. It was first published in Hymns and Psalms in 1844 with seven verses under the title "After Harvest". "Come, Ye Thankful People, Come" was set to George J. Elvey's hymn tune St. George's, Windsor in 1858. In 1865, Alford revised the hymn, and it was republished in his Poetical Works with only four verses. In 1861 there had been a number of unofficial revisions of the hymn, including one in Hymns Ancient and Modern, which led to Alford publishing a footnote in Poetical Works stating his disapproval of these revisions that had been made without his agreement. Despite this, Alford revised the hymn again in 1867 in Year of Praise. Alford was a moderate who attempted to keep good relations between non-conformists and the High Church Anglicans in the Church of England: "Come, Ye Thankful People, Come" is commonly found in evangelical hymn books, as are Alford's "Forward be our watchword" and "Ten thousand times ten thousand". The hymn later gained popularity in the United States where it is used as part of Thanksgiving celebrations.

The first verse is written as a celebration of the harvest, calling for people to give thanks to God for it. The last two verses are based on the Parable of the Tares, and discuss the last harvest at the Second Coming of Jesus.

== Lyrics ==
1. Come, ye thankful people, come,
Raise the song of harvest home!
All is safely gathered in,
Ere the winter storms begin;
God, our Maker, doth provide
For our wants to be supplied;
Come to God's own temple, come;
Raise the song of harvest home!

2. We ourselves are God's own field,
Fruit unto his praise to yield;
Wheat and tares together sown
Unto joy or sorrow grown;
First the blade and then the ear,
Then the full corn shall appear;
Grant, O harvest Lord, that we
Wholesome grain and pure may be.

3. For the Lord our God shall come,
And shall take the harvest home;
From His field shall in that day
All offences purge away,
Giving angels charge at last
In the fire the tares to cast;
But the fruitful ears to store
In the garner evermore.

4. Then, thou Church triumphant come,
Raise the song of harvest home!
All be safely gathered in,
Free from sorrow, free from sin,
There, forever purified,
In God's garner to abide;
Come, ten thousand angels, come,
Raise the glorious harvest home!

=== Hymns Ancient & Modern ===
2. All this world is God's own field,
Fruit unto his praise to yield;
Wheat and tares therein are sown
Unto joy or sorrow grown;
Ripening with a wondrous power
Till the final harvest-hour:
Grant, O Lord of life, that we
Holy grain and pure may be.

3. For we know that thou wilt come,
And wilt take thy people home;
From thy field wilt purge away
All that doth offend, that day;
And thine angels charge at last
In the fire the tares to cast,
But the fruitful ears to store
In thy garner evermore.

4. Come then, Lord of mercy, come,
Bid us sing thy harvest-home:
Let thy saints be gathered in
Free from sorrow, free from sin;
All upon the golden floor
Praising thee for evermore:
Come, with all thine angels come,
Bid us sing thy harvest home.
