= Snowsport Cymru/Wales =

Governing body of snowsport in Wales

Snowsport Cymru/Wales is the national governing body of skiing and snowboarding in Wales. Its membership comprises individuals, schools, corporate sponsors and six affiliated clubs. Snowsport Cymru/Wales selects, organises and trains the Wales National Ski Squad. It is a member of GB Snowsport, the Olympic and Paralympics registered association for snowsports in the UK.

Snowsport Cymru/Wales manages the Cardiff Ski & Snowboard Centre, Fairwater, Cardiff, where it is based.
