= Patrick Cotter (croquet player) =

Croquet and bridge player

Edmond Patrick Charles Cotter
- Born: 24 September 1904; Ireland
- Died: 8 March 1996 (aged 91); London, England, United Kingdom

Edmond Patrick Charles Cotter (24 September 1904 – 8 March 1996) was a croquet player from Ireland. Cotter was one of the most successful croquet players in the 1950s and 1960s winning the President's Cup six times (1949, 1950, 1952, 1953, 1956 and 1960), the Open Championship three times (1955, 1958 and 1962) and the Men's Championship four times (1952, 1954, 1963 and 1969). He also won the Open Doubles Championship on ten occasions (1954, 1955, 1958, 1959, 1961–1965 and 1969) on each occasion being partnered by John Solomon.

Cotter represented England in two MacRobertson Shield tournaments, winning on both occasions.

In 2009 Cotter was inducted into the World Croquet Federation Hall of Fame.

Cotter was a scholar at Christ Church, Oxford (1923–1927), where he was awarded the 1924 Gaisford Prize for Greek Verse.

Cotter was a schoolmaster at St Paul's school, Hammersmith, where he taught Latin and Greek. Cotter was also an international bridge player, who wrote a weekly article on bridge for the Financial Times and a monthly one for Country Life. He was in the 1937/38 winning team in the Bridge Great Britain Gold Cup. He also wrote a weekly crossword competition in The Times, and also a fine golfer.

== Career statistics ==
=== Major tournament performance timeline ===
Key
W	F	SF	QF	#R	RR	Q#	DNQ	A	NH

(W) winner; (F) finalist; (SF) semifinalist; (QF) quarterfinalist; (#R) rounds 4, 3, 2, 1; (RR) round-robin stage; (Q#) qualification round; (DNQ) did not qualify; (A) absent; (NH) not held; (SR) strike rate (events won / competed); (W–L) win–loss record.

The President's Cup is played as a 8/10 player round-robin and the number indicates the final position achieved.

Tournament	1948	1949	1950	1951	1952	1953	1954	1955	1956	1957	1958	1959	1960	1961
Open Championship	1R	1R	2R	F	F	SF	QF	W	SF	2R	W	2R	2R	QF
Men's Championship	QF	F	2R	SF	W	SF	W	A	2R	SF	F	F	1R	SF
President's Cup	A	W	W	5	W	W	2	2	W	2	3	3	W	3
Win-loss	1–2	3–2	2–2	7–2	9–1	4–2	6–1	5–0	5–2	2–2	8–1	4–2	0–2	5–2

Tournament	1962	1963	1964	1965	1966	1967	1968	1969	1970	1971	1972	1973	1974	SR	W–L	Win %
Open Championship	W	F	SF	2R	2R	QF	1R	QF	QF	2R	A	QF	1R	3 / 26	51–23	68.9
Men's Championship	SF	W	SF	SF	SF	A	1R	W	F	QF	A	A	A	4 / 22	49–18	73.1
President's Cup	2	2	4=	3	5=	6	A	3=	5=	A	A	A	A	6 / 21		
Win-loss	7–1	8–1	5–2	3–2	3–2	2–1	0–2	4–1	4–2	1–2	0–0	2–1	0–1	13 / 67	100–41	70.9

== Works ==
- Tackle Croquet This Way (Stanley Paul & Co Ltd, 1960)
- Bridge Play Technique (Robert Hale Ltd, 1982) ISBN 0709032021
- Contract Bridge (The teach yourself books) ISBN 0340055553
- Tackle Bridge (Stanley Paul & Co Ltd, 1973) ISBN 0091181607
- Financial Times Book of Bridge (Robert Hale Ltd, 1977) ISBN 0709162715
