= Ben Apps =

English croquet player

Benjamin Charles Apps
- Born: 1871
- Died: 25 September 1935 (aged 63–64); Craycombe, England
- Occupation: Croquet player
- Spouse: Lorn Campbell Apps (m. 1928)

Benjamin Charles Apps (1871 – 25 September 1935) was a croquet player from England.

Ben Apps won the Open Championship three times (1926, 1930 and 1931) and the Men's Championship twice (1929 and 1931).

As an administrator, Apps served on the Council of the Croquet Association between 1923 and 1931.
