= Handel Elvey =

English croquet player

George Frederick Handel Elvey
- Born: 29 March 1883; Berkshire, England
- Died: 20 March 1967 (aged 83); Devon, England
- Spouse: Nora Christine Gethin (m. 1927)

Reverend George Frederick Handel Elvey (29 June 1883 – 20 March 1967) was a croquet player from England. He was the youngest son of composer George Elvey and his fourth wife Mary née Savory.

Handel Elvey won the Doubles Championship in 1936 partnering his wife Nora and the Men's Championship of the South Of England in 1955.

As an administrator, Elvey served on the Council of the Croquet Association between 1931 and 1967, serving as Chairman (1939 to 1948) and Vice President (1952 to 1967).

Elvey spent most of his clerical life in the diocese of Chichester.

== Works ==
- Croquet — A Handbook On The Strokes And Tactics Of The Game (John Jaques and Son, Ltd, 1949).
