= Alan Blackshaw =

British mountaineer and skier (1933–2011)

Alan Blackshaw OBE (7 April 1933 – 4 August 2011) was an English mountaineer, skier and civil servant who was President of the Alpine Club from 2001 to 2004 and President of the Ski Club of Great Britain from 1997 to 2003.

== Early life ==
Blackshaw was born in Liverpool and was educated at Merchant Taylors' School, Crosby (as a foundation Scholar) 1944–1951, and at Wadham College, Oxford (where he was an Open Scholar), 1951–54, and took a degree in Modern History.

== Mountaineer and skier ==
In the 1950s he climbed in the Alps, making ascents of the north-east face of Piz Badile, the north face of the Aiguille du Triolet, and the south face of Pointe Gugliermina. Expeditions outside Europe include the Caucasus, Greenland and the Garwhal Himalaya.

In 1972, he made a continuous ski traverse of the Alps from Kaprun to Gap, and between 1973 and 1978 he likewise traversed Scandinavia by ski, from Lakselv to Adneram.

In 1965, he published the handbook Mountaineering: From Hill Walking to Alpine Climbing.

- 1973–1976: President, British Mountaineering Council (Patron since 1978)
- 1985–1997: Chairman of Committee for Plas y Brenin, Sports Council National Mountain Centre, North Wales
- 1985–1988: Chairman, British Ski Federation
- 1991–1994: Chairman, Scottish National Ski Council (and President, 1994–2000)
- 1997–2003: President, Ski Club of Great Britain
- 2001–2004: President, Alpine Club
- 2004–2005: President, International Climbing and Mountaineering Federation (UIAA)

== Career summary ==
- 1954–1956: 42 Royal Marines Commando, Cliff Assault Wing (officer instructor)
- 1956–1974: Royal Marines Reserve (mountain warfare instructor)
- 1956–1979: Civil service
- 1965–1967: First Secretary, Diplomatic Service, with UK Delegation to OECD, Paris
- 1967–1970: Principal Private Secretary to three Ministers of Power
- 1971–1972: Head of Home Branch, Iron and Steel division
- 1972–1974: Seconded to Charterhouse Bank in the City of London
- 1974–1978: Under-Secretary and later Director-General, Offshore Supplies Office, Member of Scottish Council for Development and Industry, Offshore Energy Technology Board, and Ship and Marine Technology Requirements Board
- 1978–1979: Under Secretary, Coal division, London
- 1979–2007: Management consultant with Strategy International Limited and Oakwood Environmental Limited
- 1990–1995: Board Member, Scottish Sports Council
- 1991–1997: Board Member, Scottish Natural Heritage
- 1998– : Member of Cairngorms Partnership Board
