= George Elvey =

English organist and composer

Sir George Job Elvey (1816–1893) was an English organist and composer.

== Life ==
He was born at Canterbury on 29 March 1816, a son of John Elvey. For several generations, his family had been connected with the musical life of the cathedral city. At an early age, he was admitted as a chorister of Canterbury Cathedral, under Highmore Skeats, his brother, Stephen Elvey, being then master of the boys.

In 1830, Stephen Elvey having been appointed organist of New College, Oxford, George went to reside with him, and completed his musical education under his brother's guidance. He studied at the Royal Academy of Music under Cipriani Potter and William Crotch.

Before he was seventeen, he had become an expert organist and took temporary duty at Christ Church, Magdalen, and New College. In 1834, he gained the Gresham gold medal for his anthem "Bow down Thine ear, Lord." In 1835, he succeeded Skeats as organist of St. George's Chapel, Windsor. Among his earliest pupils were Prince George, Duke of Cambridge and Prince Edward of Saxe-Weimar, for whose confirmation he composed his well-known anthem, "Wherewithal shall a young man cleanse his way?"

He matriculated from New College on 17 May 1838 and graduated Mus. Bac. on 2 June following, his exercise being an oratorio, "The Resurrection and Ascension," afterwards performed by the Sacred Harmonic Society at Exeter Hall (12 November 1838), and subsequently at Boston, United States of America, and at Glasgow. On 2 July 1840, by a special dispensation of the chancellor of the university, Elvey graduated Mus. Doc. two years earlier than was allowed by the statutes. His exercise on this occasion was the anthem, "The ways of Zion do mourn." Two anthems, with orchestral accompaniments, "The Lord is King," and "Sing, Heavens," were written respectively for the Gloucester festival of 1853 and the Worcester festival of 1857.

Of his best-known works produced chiefly between 1856 and 1860 many were composed for special services at St. George's Chapel. By the death of Prince Albert in 1861, Elvey lost one of his most sympathetic patrons. The funeral anthems, "The Souls of the Righteous" and "Blessed are the Dead," were both written for anniversary services in memory of the prince. For the marriage of the Prince of Wales (1863) he composed a special anthem, with organ and orchestral accompaniment, "Sing unto God," and for the marriage of Princess Louise (1871) a festal march which attained considerable popularity.

He was knighted on 24 March 1871. The last important public event in which he took part was the marriage of Prince Leopold, Duke of Albany at St. George's Chapel on 6 May 1882. In June of that year, he resigned his post as organist. After some years spent in retirement he died at the Towers, Windlesham, on 9 September 1893.

== Family ==
On 19 June 1838, Elvey married Harriette, daughter of his tutor, Highmore Skeats, and by her, on 30 December 1851, had one son, George Highmore Elvey (died 1875). Then on 22 August 1854, he married Georgiana, daughter of John Bowyer Nichols, and by her had three sons and one daughter; she died on 22 December 1863. On 20 April 1865, he married Eleanora Grace, daughter of Richard Jarvis; she died on 23 January 1879. On 20 June 1882, he married Mary Savory (born 1848), a sister of Sir Joseph Savory; she survived him. Their son was Handel Elvey.

== Legacy ==
Elvey was a prolific writer of church music. Besides the anthems already mentioned, his chants, his "Cantate Domino," a "Deus misereatur" in D, were among his most popular compositions. He also wrote fifteen part songs, an introduction and gavotte for piano and violin, and four pianoforte pieces.

His works, which are nearly all for the church, include two oratorios, a great number of anthems and services, psalm chants and some pieces for the organ. His most famous work is probably the hymn tune Diademata, to which "Crown Him with Many Crowns" and "Soldiers of Christ, Arise" are most commonly set. The hymns "Come, Ye Thankful People, Come" and "Now We Sing a Harvest Song" to his tune "St George's Windsor" are also well-known staples in the liturgy. A memoir of him, by his widow, was published in 1894.

== Notes ==
Attribution:

- This article incorporates text from a publication now in the public domain: Newmarch, Rosa Harriet (1901). "Elvey, George Job". In Lee, Sidney (ed.). Dictionary of National Biography (1st supplement). London: Smith, Elder & Co.
