= Nigel Aspinall =

English croquet player

Nigel Aspinall (born 1946) is a croquet player from England. Aspinall was one of the most successful croquet players in the 1970s and 1980s, winning the President's Cup eleven times (1969, 1970, 1973, 1974, 1975, 1976, 1978, 1980, 1982, 1984 and 1985), the Open Championship eight times (1969, 1974, 1975, 1976, 1978, 1982, 1983 and 1984) and the Men's Championship twice (1973 and 1983). Aspinall represented Great Britain in four MacRobertson Shield tournaments, winning on two occasions.

In 2007, Aspinall was inducted into the World Croquet Federation Hall of Fame.

== Career statistics ==
=== Major tournament performance timeline ===
Tournament	1966	1967	1968	1969	1970	1971	1972	1973	1974	1975	1976	1977	1978	1979	1980
Open Championship	1R	SF	F	W	F	F	QF	SF	W	W	W	3R	W	3R	F
Men's Championship	A	A	1R	A	A	A	F	W	A	A	A	A	A	A	A
President's Cup	2=	5	2=	W	W	3	2	W	W	W	W	2	W	A	W
Win-loss	0–1	3–1	4–2	5–0	4–1	4–1	5–2	8–0	5–0	5–0	5–0	1–1	5–0	2–1	4–1

Tournament	1981	1982	1983	1984	1985	1986	1987	1988	1989	1990	1991	1992	1993	SR	W–L	Win %
Open Championship	2R	W	W	W	3R	SF	QF	F	2R	QF	QF	3R	3R	8 / 28	92–19	82.9
Men's Championship	A	A	W	A	A	A	A	A	A	A	A	A	A	2 / 4	12–2	85.7
President's Cup	2	W	3	W	W	2	A	4	5	A	A	7	A	11 / 23		
Win-loss	1–1	5–0	10–0	6–0	2–1	4–1	2–1	5–1	0–1	3–1	3–1	1–1	2–1	21–55	104–21	

Key
W	F	SF	QF	#R	RR	Q#	DNQ	A	NH

(W) winner; (F) finalist; (SF) semifinalist; (QF) quarterfinalist; (#R) rounds 4, 3, 2, 1; (RR) round-robin stage; (Q#) qualification round; (DNQ) did not qualify; (A) absent; (NH) not held; (SR) strike rate (events won / competed); (W–L) win–loss record.

The President's Cup is played as a 8/10 player round-robin and the number indicates the final position achieved.
