= Scott Holland Memorial Lectures =

The Scott Holland Memorial Lectures are held in memory of Henry Scott Holland. They are given by a prominent Anglican scholar of religion and society in the United Kingdom.

== Previous lectures ==
Year	Lecturer(s)	Lecture title
1922	R. H. Tawney	"Religious Thought on Social Questions in the 16th & 17th Centuries"
1925	C. E. Osborne	"The Secular State in Relation to 'Christian Ideals'"
1928	William Temple	"Christianity and the State"
1930	A. D. Lindsay	"Christianity and Economics"
1933	Walter Moberly	"The Ethics of Punishment"
1936	S. C. Carpenter	"The Bible View of Life"
1943–1944	L. S. Thornton	"Christ and Human Society: A Biblical Interpretation"
1946	Maurice B. Reckitt	"Maurice to Temple: A Century of the Social Movement in the Church of England"
1949	V. A. Demant	"Religion and the Decline of Capitalism"
1952	D. M. Mackinnon	"The Humility of God"
1956	Joachim Wach	"Sociology of Religion"
1960	Alec Vidler	"Social Catholicism in France"
1964	Michael Ramsey	"Sacred and Secular"
1966	G. B. Bentley	"The Church, Morality and the Law"
1969	Monica Wilson	"Religion and the Transformation of Society: A Study in Social Change in Africa"
1973	H. R. McAdoo	"The Restructuring of Moral Theology"
1975	Philip Mason	"The Dove in Harness: The Paradox of Impractical Perfection"
1980	Valerie Pitt	"Christianity and the Perspectives of Culture"
1983	Ronald H. Preston	"Church and Society in the Late Twentieth Century: The Economic and Political Task"
1986	Ann Loades	"Searching for Lost Coins: Explorations in Christianity and Feminism"
1989	Rowan Williams	"Incarnation and Social Vision" (Note: With Charles Gore lecture.)
1989	John Bowker, R. Gregory, Richard Swinburne, J. Turner, and Keith Ward	"What Is a Person? Scientific and Christian Perspectives"
1992	S. Clark	"How to Save the World"
1995	Raymond Plant	"The Theology of State, Market and Community"
1998	Alan Wilkinson	"Christian Socialism: Scott Holland to Tony Blair"
2002	Martyn Percy and Jolyon Mitchell	"Seeing Through the Media: Potentials and Pitfalls for Religion"
2005	Michael Nazir-Ali	"Conviction and Conflict: Islam, Christianity and World Order"
2007	David Martin	"How Does Christianity Become Incarnate in Society"
2008	Neil MacGregor	"The Word Made Art"
2011	Frank Field	"'Purge This Realm of Bitter Things': Henry Scott Holland and the Rediscovery of Virtue"
2014	Grace Davie with Hugh MacLeod and John Wolffe	"Exploring Conflict in a Europe of Nations"
2017	Stephen Spencer with Paul Avis, Malcolm Brown, and Jeremy Morris	"Anglican Social Theology"
