= Eva Collet Reckitt =

British bookseller (1890–1976)

- Born: 28 June 1890; Beverley, Yorkshire, England
- Died: 24 September 1976 (aged 86); Hampstead, London, England
- Occupation: Bookseller
- Known for: Founder of Collet's bookshop
- Relatives: Maurice Benington Reckitt (brother)

Eva Collet Reckitt (28 June 1890 – 24 September 1976) was the founder of the left-wing bookshop Collet's on Charing Cross Road, London, UK, in 1933.

== Biography ==
Eva Collet Reckitt was born in Beverley, Yorkshire, England, on 28 June 1890, to Arthur Benington Reckitt (secretary of the starch manufacturers Reckitt and Sons) and his wife, Helen Annie, née Thomas. After the family moved to St Leonards-on-Sea, Sussex, Eva developed an interest in socialist and progressive politics, and went on to study Philosophy at University College, London, in 1921, earning a BA degree with first-class honours in 1924.

In 1927, she was elected to the executive of the Labour Research Department. As one of the heirs to the Reckitt family business, formerly Reckitt & Colman and now part of Reckitt Benckiser, she supported the Communist Party of Great Britain from the 1920s to the 1950s. Her philanthropic efforts included being a shareholder for Plato Films Ltd, the body established in 1951 to provide the Left and in particular the Communist movement with films from the Socialist part of the world.

Reckitt's left-wing political affiliations put her at odds with her elder brother, the Anglo-Catholic writer and editor Maurice Benington Reckitt. She was described by one MI5 officer as "the Communist Party's milch-cow", and was under surveillance from 1923 to 1953.

She died, aged 86, on 24 September 1976 at the Royal Free Hospital, Hampstead, London. In her obituary in the journal History Workshop, to which she had lent her support, Raphael Samuel described her socialism as "a living thing, a matter of thought, criticism and conviction", and built upon "personal loyalties nourished by a lifetime's activity".

== Collet's ==
The bookshop was owned by the Eva Collet Trust, established by Eva Collet Reckitt in 1934 to import communist and radical publications. The bookshop at 66 Charing Cross Road already existed as a radical bookshop, Henderson's, nicknamed "the bomb shop"; on the death of the owner, F. R. Henderson, in 1934, it was bought by Eva Collet Reckitt, and Olive Parsons became a founder director. In 1936, Collet's acquired the stock of the London-Soviet trading agency Arcos. After World War II, Collet's expanded by opening branches in Manchester, Glasgow, Moscow, Prague and New York City. In 1965, the head office moved to a new building in Wellingborough, Northamptonshire; by this time, it had two shops in Charing Cross Road and a Chinese shop near the British Museum. In 1993, Collet's was acquired by Tybex Ltd (the holding company of Philip Wilson Publishers Ltd). Olive Parsons was then aged 101.

According to the Radical Bookshop History Project, Eva Collet Reckitt "had a broad policy on stock but drew the line at 'those mysterious world religions' and 'phoney psychology'." The entry for Collet's in Driff's Guide to All the Secondhand & Antiquarian Bookshops in Britain (1985–86) says: "Colletts 52 Charing X Rd ...sml stk on s/h penguins ... there is also a small bsmt rm of political bks in the Collets [sic] two doors along but rumoured to be closing".

Collet's bookshop went bankrupt in 1993 and closed, although the nearby Russian Central and East European Bookshop, which purchased Collet's stock, remained open until 1997.
