= William Longman =

English croquet player

- Born: 14 November 1882
- Died: 1 March 1967 (aged 84)

William Longman (14 November 1882 – 1 March 1967) was a croquet player from England.

Longman won the Champion Cup in 1925 and was three times runner up in the Open Championship (1920, 1925 and 1926) and twice runner up in the Men's Championship (1953 and 1957). Longman represented England in the 1925 MacRobertson Shield tournament.

As an administrator, Longman served on the Council of the Croquet Association between 1919 and 1967, serving as Chairman (1924 to 1926) and Vice President (1948 to 1967).

== Works ==
- Croquet in the Sixties (Longmans, Green & Co, 1921).
