= Spooning (croquet) =

Term in croquet

In croquet, the term spooning has historically been used to refer to two ways of setting the ball into motion. The term is rarely used in the modern game and is not defined in the official laws.

== Pushing ==
In one sense, it is simply pushing the ball with the mallet instead of tapping. It is recognized by making no noise. This was at one time considered an unfair but good technique, upon appeal the umpire must declare whether the ball was spooned or tapped. In modern Association Croquet, pushing the ball would generally constitute a fault under rule 28.a.4, which makes it a fault if the striker "moves the striker's ball other than by striking it with the mallet audibly and distinctly", or under rule 28.a.7.C, if "the mallet [remains] in contact with the striker's ball for an observable period."

There are techniques that involve the pushing of a ball which are not considered "spooning". In a roll shot, the player's and the croqueted balls are driven together in a stroke which starts with a tap and then the mallet is immediately trailed right behind the balls. It is not considered spooning as long as one and only one distinct tap is heard. If the mallet leaves the ball after the tap and returns to the ball, it is considered spooning. In the modern laws this is usually referred to as a "double tap", and is a fault under rule 28.a.7. The "pass" stroke, which also drives two balls, is used to drive the striker's ball further than the croqueted one. It also involves the dwelling of the mallet on the tapped ball, with the same restrictions as for the roll shot.

In 19th century spooning was considered a women's way of cheating in sports, frequently mentioned in sports magazines of the time. A notable case was an official accusation of the British Open champion Lily Gower of spooning in 1901.

== Swinging ==
In another sense, "spooning" is when the mallet is swung in a wide arc, to generate more power. Unlike the first meaning, spooning has been considered fair in a match of gentlemen, but pre-20th century ladies in hoopskirts were at a disadvantage being unable to "spoon" in this way.
