= Dorothy Steel (croquet player) =

English croquet player

Dorothy Dyne Steel
- Born: 21 April 1884; Woodsetts, Yorkshire, England
- Died: 22 January 1965 (aged 80); Bedford, England

Dorothy Dyne Steel (21 April 1884 – 22 January 1965), commonly referred to as D. D. Steel, was an English croquet player.

Steel dominated English croquet in the 1920s and 1930s, winning the Best 10 competition six times (1922, 1923, 1931, 1933, 1934, 1937), the Open Championship four times (1925, 1933, 1935 and 1936) and the Women's Championship fifteen times (1919, 1922, 1925, 1926, 1927, 1929, 1930, 1932, 1933, 1934, 1935, 1936, 1937, 1938, 1939).

She represented England in three MacRobertson Shield tournaments, winning on two occasions.

In 2011, Steel was inducted into the World Croquet Federation Hall of Fame.

== Career statistics ==
=== Major tournament performance timeline ===
Tournament	1914	1919	1920	1921	1922	1923	1924	1925	1926	1927	1928	1929	1930	1931	1932	1933	1934
Open Championship	A	A	A	A	A	F	F	W	SF	3R	F	F	SF	QF	F	W	QF
Women's Championship	F	W	F	SF	W	A	A	W	W	W	A	W	W	1R	W	W	W
Champion Cup	A	A	A	A	W	W	4	4=	6=	5	4=	2	2	W	5=	W	W
Win-loss	4–1	4–0	4–1	3–1	5–0	5–1	4–1	10–0	9–1	6–1	4–1	8–1	8–1	2–2	8–1	9–0	6–1

Tournament	1935	1936	1937	1938	1939	1946	1947	1948	1949	1950	1951	1952	1953	1954	1955	SR	W–L	Win %
Open Championship	W	W	3R	SF	F	A	QF	2R	1R	3R	A	A	A	A	QF	4 / 22	66–18	78.6
Women's Championship	W	W	W	W	W	A	A	A	A	A	A	A	A	A	1R	15 / 20	74–5	93.7
President's Cup	4=	2	W	3	NH^{*}	A	A	2=	A	A	A	A	A	A	A	6 / 19		
Win-loss	9–0	9–0	5–1	7–1	7–1	0–0	1–1	1–1	0–1	1–1	0–0	0–0	1–1	0–0	0–1	25/61	140–23	85.9

^{*} not held because of outbreak of World War 2.

Key
W	F	SF	QF	#R	RR	Q#	DNQ	A	NH

(W) winner; (F) finalist; (SF) semifinalist; (QF) quarterfinalist; (#R) rounds 4, 3, 2, 1; (RR) round-robin stage; (Q#) qualification round; (DNQ) did not qualify; (A) absent; (NH) not held; (SR) strike rate (events won / competed); (W–L) win–loss record.

The Champion Cup/President's Cup is played as a 8/10 player round-robin and the number indicates the final position achieved.

The Champion Cup was won outright by Miss Steel in 1933 and was replaced by the President's Cup. Until 1938 ten players played in the event. Since then eight have played.
