= Valerie Pitt =

British academic and activist (1925–1999)

- Born: 14 February 1925; Peckham, London, England
- Died: 4 January 1999 (aged 73); London, England
- Occupation: Academic
- Known for: Campaigning for ordination of women in the Church of England

Valerie Pitt (14 February 1925 – 4 January 1999) was a British academic and activist who was a professor of English literature. She was a doughty campaigner for the ordination of women and the disestablishment of the Church of England.

== Early life and education ==
Valerie Joan Pitt was born on 14 February 1925 in Peckham, South London, to Elizabeth (née Dixon) and William Bygrave Pitt. Named for St Valentine, on whose day she was born, Pitt had five younger siblings. Her family were working class and heavily involved in community work through strongly held socialist beliefs. Her paternal grandfather was a keen member of the Amalgamated Engineering Union, while her maternal grandfather Dixon was part of the Bakers Union leadership and in 1913 spoke to a crowd massed in Trafalgar Square during a major bakers' strike. Her lorry driver father entertained the children with songs and stories he had learned in school or from his time in the army. Pitt was particularly taken with his recitations of Tennyson's poems, which had a strong influence on her later academic career. Four of the Pitt children attended Oxford University.

Pitt attended Mary Datchelor School in Camberwell on a scholarship, where a debate with communists whilst wearing her school unifom brought her a reprimand. A gifted student, in 1943 she won an exhibition scholarship to read English at St Hugh's College, Oxford, graduating with a first class degree. Pitt was secretary of the university's Socratic Club and became sufficiently friendly with C. S. Lewis for him to suggest her calling him Jack. During her time as an undergraduate, she joined the Anglican Church.

After a brief time teaching in Birmingham between 1945 and 1946, Pitt returned to Oxford as a Mary Gray Allen Scholar between 1947 and 1949. Pitt's dissertation for her BLitt explored the roots of Romantic poet Percy Bysshe Shelley's philosophy.

== Academic career ==
Pitt began her academic career as a lecturer at the University of Wales in Cardiff, before becoming a Fellow of Newnham College, Cambridge in 1953. Her pupils there included A. S. Byatt, Margaret Drabble and Sylvia Plath, she considered the latter brilliant but unstable. In 1958 she took up a role as lecturer at was then called Woolwich Polytechnic. She worked there for nearly 30 years, as the organisation changed its name to first Thames Polytechnic and later the University of Greenwich. Pitt played a significant role in the development of the institution. In 1960 Pitt was promoted to Senior Lecturer and became Principal Lecturer in charge of humanities in 1966. She headed the Department of Liberal Studies and was later promoted to Head of the School of Humanities in 1971.

Pitt gave the Scott Holland Memorial Lectures in 1980.

She achieved the title of Professor around the time of her retirement in 1987 and in 1988 gave her inaugural professorial lecture on The Idea of the University. In this lecture she equated "outcomes theory" (an education buzz word popular at the time) with the outflow of sewage.

Pitt's major academic publication was her book on Alfred, Lord Tennyson, Tennyson Laureate, published in 1962.

== Church of England activism ==
Pitt first joined the Anglican Communion whilst an undergraduate at Oxford, having met and been influenced by the Anglican priest and scholar Austin Farrer. She was mentored by Michael Ramsey, later Archbishop of Canterbury in the 1960s. Her confessor for the next 50 years was Percy Coleman.

Having joined the Church of England as an undergraduate, Pitt focussed her considerable intellect towards the radical end of Anglicanism. She was deeply critical of the Church Commissioners, publishing her thoughts in a pamphlet through the monthly journal Prism in 1967. She was no less critical of what she considered the "cliche-ridden and patronising style" of the 1968 Lambeth Conference assembly of Anglican bishops in a pamphlet she published in November that year.

Pitt was elected to the Church Assembly (now the General Synod of the Church of England) in 1965, sitting in the House of Laity. She was known for making spontaneous speeches at Church Assembly meetings, which were much appreciated by members who were not the target of her ire.

On 29 June 1967, she made the first resolution to the Church Assembly for the admission of women to holy orders. It took another 25 years before women were given the right to be ordained in the Church of England, with the first women priests ordained in 1994. Pitt greeted the change she had fought so hard for with the statement that she did not understand why any woman would want to be a priest. Both a niece and a nephew went on to join the clergy.

Before the 1968 Lambeth Conference she called for delegates to "to help the Church to live with the Revolution" in light of the year of global unrest and activism. Pitt decried the compete lack of discussion of youth work in the conference, stating that "the shepherds of the Anglican flock will devote themselves earnestly, piously and with considerable learning to the problems not of the next ten years but of the past ten years".

Pitt was part of the Chadwick Commission (Archbishops' Commission on Church and State) which ran between 1966 and 1970. She was a strong advocate for the disestablishment of the Church of England. She considered that the creation of the Church of England in the Tudor era had led to "inherited structures of society...creating and reinforcing a mindset in the population in which religious duty keeps people from questioning secular oppression". She went on to state "the basic premise of establishment is a lie. There is no commonalty between the people of England and the Church of England. The acceptance of that lie, the fact that it has got into the blood and bones of our communion, is actually paralysing: the church does not really know what the people are like and neither does it understand its own identity".

== Death and legacy ==
Valerie Pitt died in London on 4 January 1999.

Some of Pitt's papers, including correspondence with Katherine and Austin Farrer, were donated to the collection of the Bodleian Library in Oxford after her death by her sister Mrs Kirkwood.
