= Croquet Association =

Coordinates: 51.88542°N 2.068622°W

- Sport: Croquet
- Jurisdiction: England
- Abbreviation: CA
- Founded: 1897
- Affiliation: World Croquet Federation
- Affiliation date: 1989
- Headquarters: Cheltenham
- Location: Old Bath Road
- President: Jonathan Isaacs
- Chairman: Samir Patel

Official website
- www.croquet.org.uk
- (England)

The Croquet Association, which was formed as the United All England Croquet Association in 1897, is the national governing body for the sport of croquet in England. Until 1974 the association was responsible for croquet in the whole of the United Kingdom. The Scottish Croquet Association, formed in 1974, now has responsibility for croquet in Scotland. At the 2013 AGM the association formally relinquished control of the game in the other parts of the United Kingdom.

Presidents of the association have included Sir Compton Mackenzie, who was President from 1953 to 1966. The association controls the rules of the game, in conjunction with the croquet associations of Australia, New Zealand and the United States. It also controls the regulations of tournaments for its member clubs. The Open Championship (association) of croquet originally dates back to 1867, but after a hiatus during the years 1883-1896 was reintroduced by the Croquet Association. This and the Golf Croquet Open Championship are the premier events in the UK of each code.

== Competitions ==
=== Association Croquet competitions ===
The President's Cup was introduced in 1901, though at the time it was known as the Beddow Cup, named after A.E.Beddow, the trophy's donor. The President's Cup was an invitational rather than an open competition, and was contested between the top ten (now eight) croquet players chosen by the Croquet Association. The original cup became the property of Miss Dorothy Dyne Steel in 1933 after she won the competition for a record fourth time. A new cup was required for the 1934 competition and one was presented by then president, Trevor Williams, the competition being known as the President's Cup from that date.

In 2001, the Open Championship was combined with the World Championship.

==== Singles competitions ====
Year	Croquet Championship	Women's Championship	Men's Championship	President's Cup
1867	Walter Whitmore			
1868	Walter H. Peel			
1869	George Curling Joad	Mrs GC Joad		
1870	Walter H. Peel (2)	Miss Walter		
1871	Walter H. Peel (3)	Mrs JH Walsh		
1872	C. Black	Mrs JH Walsh (2)		
1873	James Heath	Mrs JH Walsh (3)		
1874	James Heath (2)	Miss FH Williamson		
1875	Reginald Gray	Mrs Hallows		
1876	Colonel Busk	Miss K. Philbrick		
1877	B. Carter Evelegh	Miss K. Philbrick (2)		
1878	A. H. Spong	Miss E Walsh		
1879	B. Carter Evelegh (2)	Miss E Walsh (2)		
1880	A. H. Spong (2)	Miss E Walsh (3)		
1881	A. H. Spong (3)	Miss K. Philbrick (3)		
1882	A. H. Spong (4)	Miss K. Philbrick (4)		
1883-1896	No Competition	No Competition		
1897	Charles Willis	Maud Drummond		
1898	Clement Powell	Olive Henry		
1899	B. Carter Evelegh (3)	Lily Gower		
1900	John Austin	Lily Gower (2)		
1901	Robert Roper	Lily Gower (3)		William Bruce
1902	Cyril Corbally	Miss M Glyn		Geoffrey Woolston
1903	Cyril Corbally (2)	Nina Coote		Geoffrey Woolston (2)
1904	Reginald Beaton	Miss V. Rowley		Lily Gower
1905	Lily Gower	Nina Coote (2)		Reginald Beaton
1906	Cyril Corbally (3)	Mrs J. Watson		Geoffrey Woolston (3)
1907	Reginald Beaton (2)	Eveline Bramwell		Maurice Barry
1908	Cyril Corbally (4)	Eveline Bramwell (2)		Edmund Fawcett
1909	Geoffrey Ashmore	Nora J Beausire		Leslie O'Callaghan
1910	Leslie O'Callaghan	Bertha Willis		Leslie O'Callaghan (2)
1911	Edgar Whitaker	Elsie Reid		H Maxwell Browne
1912	Leslie O'Callaghan (2)	Ella Simeon		Duff Mathews
1913	Cyril Corbally (5)	Lady Julian Parr		Cyril Corbally
1914	Duff Mathews	Eveline Bramwell (3)		Herbert Snell
1915-1918	No Competition	No Competition		No Competition
1919	Duff Mathews (2)	Dorothy Steel		Claude Barry
1920	Duff Mathews (3)	Bertha Hope		Leslie O'Callaghan (3)
1921	Leslie O'Callaghan (3)	Noel Gilchrist		Claude Barry (2)
1922	Charles Pepper	Dorothy Steel (2)		Dorothy Steel
1923	Herbert Snell	Lorn Strickland		Dorothy Steel (2)
1924	David Joseph	Mona Bryan		Noel de la Mothe (née Gilchrist)
1925	Dorothy Steel	Dorothy Steel (3)	Charles Elwes	William Longman
1926	Ben Apps	Dorothy Steel (4)	Cyril Corbally	Edgar Whitaker
1927	Duff Mathews (4)	Dorothy Steel (5)	Lt.-Col. William Du Pre	Edgar Whitaker (2)
1928	Knightley Coxe	Lily Beaton (4)	Bernard Klein	Knightley Coxe
1929	Lt.-Col. William Du Pre	Dorothy Steel (6)	Ben Apps	Bruce Morgan
1930	Ben Apps (2)	Dorothy Steel (7)	Humphrey Hicks	Humphrey Hicks
1931	Ben Apps (3)	Effie Ionides	Ben Apps (2)	Dorothy Steel (3)
1932	Humphrey Hicks	Dorothy Steel (8)	Humphrey Hicks (2)	Bruce Morgan (2)
1933	Dorothy Steel	Dorothy Steel (9)	Lt.-Col. William Du Pre (2)	Dorothy Steel (4)
1934	Lt.-Col. William Du Pre (2)	Dorothy Steel (10)	John Lovett	Dorothy Steel (5)
1935	Dorothy Steel (2)	Dorothy Steel (11)	Maurice Reckitt	Lt.-Col. William Du Pre
1936	Dorothy Steel (3)	Dorothy Steel (12)	Lt.-Col. William Du Pre (3)	Lorn C. Apps
1937	Charles Colman	Dorothy Steel (13)	John McMordie	Dorothy Steel (6)
1938	Dudley Hamilton-Miller	Dorothy Steel (14)	Charles Colman	Charles Colman
1939	Humphrey Hicks (2)	Dorothy Steel (15)	Robert Tingey	No Competition
1940-1945	No Competition	No Competition	No Competition	No Competition
1946	Dudley Hamilton-Miller (2)	Phyllis Wiggins	Maurice Reckitt (2)	Dudley Hamilton-Miller
1947	Humphrey Hicks (3)	Nora Elvey	Eddie Ward Petley	Humphrey Hicks (2)
1948	Humphrey Hicks (4)	Nora Elvey (2)	Humphrey Hicks (3)	Humphrey Hicks (3)
1949	Humphrey Hicks (5)	Daisy Lintern	Humphrey Hicks (4)	Pat Cotter
1950	Humphrey Hicks (6)	Margaret Claughton	Humphrey Hicks (5)	Pat Cotter (2)
1951	Geoffrey L. Reckitt	Daisy Lintern (2)	John Solomon	Humphrey Hicks (4)
1952	Humphrey Hicks (7)	Hope Rotherham	Pat Cotter	Pat Cotter (3)
1953	John Solomon	Hope Rotherham (2)	John Solomon (2)	Pat Cotter (4)
1954	Arthur Ross	Daisy Lintern (3)	Pat Cotter (2)	Humphrey Hicks (5)
1955	Pat Cotter	Hope Rotherham (3)	Humphrey Hicks (6)	John Solomon
1956	John Solomon (2)	Ada Kirk	Humphrey Hicks (7)	Pat Cotter (5)
1957	Bobby Wiggins	Daisy Lintern (4)	Bobby Wiggins	John Solomon (2)
1958	Pat Cotter (2)	Daisy Lintern (5)	John Solomon (3)	John Solomon (3)
1959	John Solomon (3)	Hope Rotherham (4)	John Solomon (4)	John Solomon (4)
1960	Hope Rotherham	Joan Warwick	John Solomon (5)	Pat Cotter (6)
1961	John Solomon (4)	Isobel Roe	Humphrey Hicks (8)	Humphrey Hicks (6)
1962	Pat Cotter (3)	Joan Warwick (2)	John Solomon (6)	John Solomon (5)
1963	John Solomon (5)	Hope Rotherham (5)	John Solomon (7)	John Solomon (6)
1964	John Solomon (6)	Hope Rotherham (6)	John Solomon (8)	John Solomon (7)
1965	John Solomon (7)	Joan Warwick (3)	John Solomon (9)	John Bolton
1966	John Solomon (8)	Joan Warwick (4)	Humphrey Hicks (9)	William Ormerod
1967	John Solomon (9)	Margaret Lightfoot	Bernard Neal	Keith Wylie
1968	John Solomon (10)	Joan Warwick (5)	Keith Wylie	John Solomon (8)
1969	Nigel Aspinall	Hope Rotherham (7)	Pat Cotter (3)	Nigel Aspinall
1970	Keith Wylie	Jean Jarden	William Ormerod	Nigel Aspinall (2)
1971	Keith Wylie (2)	Jocelyn Sundius-Smith	John Solomon (10)	John Solomon (9)
1972	Bernard Neal	Jean Jarden (2)	John Solomon (11)	William Prichard
1973	Bernard Neal (2)	Kitty Sessions	Nigel Aspinall	Nigel Aspinall (3)
1974	Nigel Aspinall (2)	Kitty Sessions (2)	Martin Murray	Nigel Aspinall (4)
1975	Nigel Aspinall (3)	Kitty Wheeler (3)	Edgar Jackson	Nigel Aspinall (5)
1976	Nigel Aspinall (4)	Barbara Meachem	Martin Murray (2)	Nigel Aspinall (6)
1977	Michael Heap	Frances Joly	Edgar Jackson (2)	Keith Wylie (2)
1978	Nigel Aspinall (5)	Veronica Carlisle	Paul Hands	Nigel Aspinall (7)
1979	David Openshaw	Barbara Meachem (2)	George Noble	Eric Solomon
1980	William Prichard	Barbara Meachem (3)	Martin Murray (3)	Nigel Aspinall (8)
1981	David Openshaw (2)	Veronica Carlisle (2)	David Openshaw	Stephen Mulliner
1982	Nigel Aspinall (6)	Susan Wiggins	Martin Murray (4)	Nigel Aspinall (9)
1983	Nigel Aspinall (7)	Susan Wiggins (2)	Nigel Aspinall (2)	Stephen Mulliner (2)
1984	Nigel Aspinall (8)	Veronica Carlisle (3)	Stephen Mulliner	Nigel Aspinall (10)
1985	David Openshaw (3)	Mary Collin	Stephen Mulliner (2)	Nigel Aspinall (11)
1986	Joe Hogan	Susan Wiggins (3)	David Foulser	Stephen Mulliner (3)
1987	Mark Avery	Mary Collin (2)	Keith Aiton	Stephen Mulliner (4)
1988	Stephen Mulliner	Debbie Cornelius	Mark Saurin	Chris Clarke
1989	Joe Hogan (2)	Bo Harris	Keith Aiton (2)	Robert Fulford
1990	Stephen Mulliner (2)	Frances Ransom	Robert Fulford	David Maugham
1991	Robert Fulford	Gail Curry	David Openshaw (2)	Chris Clarke (2)
1992	Robert Fulford (2)	Gail Curry (2)	Colin Irwin	Stephen Mulliner (5)
1993	Reginald Bamford	Gail Curry (3)	Reginald Bamford	David Maugham (2)
1994	Reginald Bamford (2)	Debbie Cornelius (2)	Michael Taylor	David Maugham (3)
1995	Reginald Bamford (3)	Gail Curry (4)	David Openshaw (3)	Chris Clarke (3)
1996	Robert Fulford (3)	Gail Curry (5)	David Goacher	Chris Clarke (4)
1997	Chris Clarke	Bo Harris (2)	Aaron Westerby	Steve Comish
1998	Robert Fulford (4)	Frances Ransom (2)	Robert Fulford (2)	Robert Fulford (2)
1999	Reginald Bamford (4)	Beatrice McGlen	Reginald Bamford (2)	Robert Fulford (3)
2000	Stephen Mulliner (3)	Louise Bradforth	Reginald Bamford (3)	Ed Cunningham
2001	Reginald Bamford (5)	Creina Dawson	Reginald Bamford (4)	Robert Fulford (4)
2002	Reginald Bamford (6)	Jenny Williams	Reginald Bamford (5)	Robert Fulford (5)
2003	Robert Fulford (5)	Gail Curry (6)	Pete Trimmer	Chris Clarke (5)
2004	Robert Fulford (6)	Liz Fleming	Reginald Bamford (6)	David Maugham (4)
2005	David Maugham	Jenny Williams (2)	Chris Clarke	Keith Aiton
2006	Robert Fulford (7)	Louise Bradforth (2)	Robert Fulford (3)	Robert Fulford (6)
2007	Robert Fulford (8)	Louise Bradforth (3)	Keith Aiton (3)	James Death
2008	Robert Fulford (9)	Louise Bradforth (4)	Keith Aiton (4)	Robert Fulford (7)
2009	Rutger Beijderwellen	Carol Smith	David Maugham	Robert Fulford (8)
2010	Reginald Bamford (7)	Gabrielle Higgins	James Death	Robert Fulford (9)
2011	Reginald Bamford (8)	Miranda Morgan	Robert Fulford (4)	Robert Fulford (10)
2012	Reginald Bamford (9)	Ailsa Lines	James Death (2)	Robert Fulford (11)
2013	Reginald Bamford (10)	Gabrielle Higgins (2)	Jamie Burch	Samir Patel
2014	Robert Fulford (10)	Gabrielle Higgins (3)	James Death (3)	Jamie Burch
2015	Robert Fulford (11)	Annabel McDiarmid	David Maugham (2)	Paddy Chapman
2016	Ben Rothman	Louise Bradforth (5)	David Maugham (3)	David Maugham (5)
2017	Reginald Bamford (11)	Jenny Clarke (3)	David Maugham (4)	Jose Riva
2018	David Maugham (2)	Louise Bradforth (6)	James Death (4)	Robert Fulford (12)
2019	James Death	Jenny Clarke (4)	James Death (5)	Jose Riva (2)
2020	Paddy Chapman	Not played	Not played	Paddy Chapman (2)
2021	Reginald Bamford (12)	Gabrielle Higgins (4)	James Death (6)	Mark Avery
2022	James Death (2)	Jenny Clarke (5)	James Death (7)	Samir Patel (2)
2023	Mark Avery (2)	Jenny Clarke (6)	Harry Fisher	Stephen Mulliner (6)
2024	James Death (3)	Jenny Clarke (7)	James Death (8)	Samir Patel (3)
2025	Robert Fulford (12)	Jenny Clarke (8)	James Death (9)	Andrew Johnston
2026	James Death (4)	Jenny Clarke (9)	Samir Patel	Stephen Mulliner (7)

==== Doubles competitions ====
Year	Doubles Championship	Mixed Doubles
1919		Claude Barry & Bertha Hope
1920		Reginald Beaton & Lily Beaton
1921		Leslie O'Callaghan & Evelyn Bramwell
1922		Richard O'Callaghan & Noel Gilchrist
1923		Lord Tollemache & Dorothy Steel
1924	Thomas Dickson & Dorothy Steel	David Joseph & Winifred Heap
1925	Duff Mathews & Trevor Williams	Robert Leetham-Jones & Millie Haslam
1926	Charles Wilson & Lily Beaton	Ben Apps & Lorn Strickland
1927	Dorothy Steel & Noel Gilchrist	Ben Apps & Lorn Strickland
1928	Dorothy Steel & Noel Gilchrist	David Joseph & Winifred Heap
1929	Bernard Klein & Charles Wentworth-Reeve	Lt.-Col. William Du Pre & Lily Beaton
1930	Lt.-Col. William Du Pre & Dorothy Steel	Trevor Hardman & Evelyn Clarkson
1931	Lt.-Col. William Du Pre & Dorothy Steel	Humphrey Hicks & Mrs FH White
1932	Charles Wilson & Windsor Richards	Lt.-Col. William Du Pre & Dorothy Steel
1933	Bernard Klein & Maurice Reckitt	Trevor Williams & Effie Ionides
1934	Bernard Klein & Maurice Reckitt	Lt.-Col. William Du Pre & Dorothy Steel
1935	Reginald Poulter & Eddie Ward Petley	Lt.-Col. William Du Pre & Dorothy Steel
1936	Handel Elvey & Nora Elvey	Lt.-Col. William Du Pre & Dorothy Steel
1937	Lord Tollemache & Sir Gerald Burke	Maurice Reckitt & Lorn Apps
1938	Charles Colman & Lily Beaton	Lt.-Col. William Du Pre & Lily Beaton
1939	Robert Tingey & Knightley Coxe	Eddie Ward-Petley & Dorothy Steel
1946	Maurice Reckitt & Daisy Lintern	Maurice Reckitt & Daisy Lintern
1947	Robert Tingey & Col. JG Clarke	Eddie Ward-Petley & Dorothy Steel
1948	Humphrey Hicks & Dudley Hamilton-Miller	Maurice Reckitt & Daisy Lintern
1949	Humphrey Hicks & Dudley Hamilton-Miller	Ashley Heenan & Winifred Kingsford
1950	Geoffrey & Maurice Reckitt	Humphrey Hicks & Hope Rotherham
1951	Humphrey Hicks & Dudley Hamilton-Miller	Pat Cotter & Isabel Turketine
1952	Humphrey Hicks & Bobby Wiggins	Maurice Reckitt & Daisy Lintern
1953	Humphrey Hicks & Bobby Wiggins	Bobby Wiggins & Hope Rotherham
1954	John Solomon & Pat Cotter	John Solomon & Freda Oddie
1955	John Solomon & Pat Cotter	Humphrey Hicks & Hope Rotherham
1956	Freddie Stone & Leslie Kirk-Greene	Gordon Rowling & Tui Mackenzie-Smartt
1957	Humphrey Hicks & Bobby Wiggins	Pat Cotter & Hope Rotherham
1958	John Solomon & Pat Cotter	Maurice Reckitt & Daisy Lintern
1959	John Solomon & Pat Cotter	Bobby Wiggins & Hope Rotherham
1960	Humphrey Hicks & William Ormerod	Gerald Cave & Muriel Reeve
1961	John Solomon & Pat Cotter	John Hollweg & Agnes Mills
1962	John Solomon & Pat Cotter	Guy Warwick & Joan Warwick
1963	John Solomon & Pat Cotter	Dudley Hamilton-Miller & Hope Rotherham
1964	John Solomon & Pat Cotter	Dudley Hamilton-Miller & Hope Rotherham
1965	John Solomon & Pat Cotter	Dudley Hamilton-Miller & Hope Rotherham
1966	Nigel Aspinall & Jon Simon	Dudley Hamilton-Miller & Hope Rotherham
1967	Dudley Hamilton-Miller & Peter Hallett	David Prichard & Joan Warwick
1968	Nigel Aspinall & Jon Simon	John Bolton & Bernie Duthie
1969	John Solomon & Pat Cotter	William & Betty Prichard
1970	Nigel Aspinall & Jon Simon	Bill Perry & Joan Warwick
1971	Nigel Aspinall & William Ormerod	Bill Perry & Joan Warwick
1972	Nigel Aspinall & William Ormerod	Bernard Neal & Jean Jarden
1973	Humphrey Hicks & John Soutter	Nigel Aspinall & Biddy Dodd
1974	John Prince & Gordon Rowling	Paul Hands & Kitty Sessions
1975	Nigel Aspinall & William Ormerod	Colin Prichard & Betty Prichard
1976	Nigel Aspinall & William Ormerod	Colin Prichard & Betty Prichard
1977	Michael Heap & Stephen Wright	Edgar Jackson & Juliet Povey
1978	Nigel Aspinall & William Ormerod	Andrew Hope & Pat Asa-Thomas
1979	Bernard Neal & Stephen Hemsted	Martin Murray & Barbara Meachem
1980	William Prichard & Stephen Mulliner	Bryan Sykes & Sue Sykes
1981	Stephen Mulliner & Mark Ormerod	Martin Murray & Barbara Meachem
1982	Andrew Hope & Martin Murray	Nigel Aspinall & Carole Knox
1983	Phil Cordingley & John McCullough	Martin Murray & Kay Yeoman
1984	Nigel Aspinall & Stephen Mulliner	Ian Bond & Veronica Carlisle
1985	Mark Avery & David Openshaw	Keith Aiton & Mary Collin
1986	Nigel Aspinall & Stephen Mulliner	Tom Griffith & Jan Macleod
1987	Mark Avery & David Openshaw	Nigel Aspinall & Debbie Cornelius
1988	Nigel Aspinall & Stephen Mulliner	Paul Smith & Carmen Bazley
1989	Joe Hogan & Bob Jackson	Ian Maugham & Bo Harris
1990	Chris Clarke & Robert Fulford	Mark Saurin & Fiona McCoig
1991	Chris Clarke & Robert Fulford	Ray & Frances Ransom
1992	Chris Clarke & Robert Fulford	John Haslam & Gail Curry
1993	Chris Clarke & Robert Fulford	David Goacher & Rosemary Gugan
1994	Reginald Bamford & Stephen Mulliner	Lewis Palmer & Annabel McDiarmid
1995	Steve Comish & David Maugham	David Goacher & Rosemary Gugan
1996	Chris Clarke & Robert Fulford	David Goacher & Rosemary Gugan
1997	Reginald Bamford & Stephen Mulliner	Don Gaunt & Kismet Whittall
1998	Chris Clarke & Robert Fulford	David Goacher & Rosemary Gugan
1999	Chris Farthing & Chris Patmore	Dave Kibble & Louise Bradforth
2000	Reginald Bamford & Stephen Mulliner	Dave Kibble & Louise Bradforth
2001	Chris Clarke & Robert Fulford	James Death & Gail Curry
2002	Chris Clarke & David Maugham	David Openshaw & Kath Priestley
2003	Not completed	David Openshaw & Kath Priestley
2004	Chris Clarke & Robert Fulford	David Maugham & Jenny Williams
2005	Reginald Bamford & John Gibbons	David Maugham & Ailsa Lines
2006	Chris Clarke & Robert Fulford	David & Eileen Magee
2007	Chris Clarke & Robert Fulford	Chris Clarke & Jenny Williams
2008	James Death & Robert Fulford	Paul Castell & Mary Knapp
2009	Ian Burridge & Jonathan Kirby	Keith Aiton & Gabrielle Higgins
2010	Robert Fletcher & Stephen Mulliner	Keith Aiton & Gabrielle Higgins
2011	Reginald Bamford & Rutger Beijderwellen	Dave Kibble & Louise Bradforth
2012	James Death & Robert Fulford	David Maugham & Ailsa Lines
2013	Kevin Beard & Jeff Dawson	Keith Aiton & Gabrielle Higgins
2014	Reginald Bamford & Ben Rothman	Keith Aiton & Gabrielle Higgins
2015	Reginald Bamford & Ben Rothman	Keith Aiton & Gabrielle Higgins
2016	Paddy Chapman & David Maugham	David Maugham & Gabrielle Higgins
2017	James Death & Samir Patel	Chris Clarke & Jenny Clarke
2018	Not Completed	David Maugham & Alison Jones
2019	James Death & Samir Patel	Mark Suter & Sarah Hayes
2020	Not contested	Not contested
2021	James Death & Samir Patel	Mark Suter & Sarah Hayes
2022	Stephen Mulliner & Mark Suter	Ian Burridge & Rachel Gee
2023	Robert Fletcher & Stephen Mulliner	Harry Fisher & Gabrielle Higgins
2024	James Death & Samir Patel	Chris Clarke & Jenny Clarke
2025	James Death & Samir Patel	Samir Patel & Debbie Lines
2026	Robert Fulford & Jack Good	Chris Clarke & Jenny Clarke

=== Golf Croquet competitions ===
The Golf Croquet First Eight is also an invitational competition contested between the top eight croquet players chosen by the Croquet Association. First held in 2008, players originally competed for the Musk's Cup, but was replaced by the Ricki Savage Memorial Trophy as the tournament was no longer sponsored by Musks.

The English National Singles Championship is a competition for which players gain places through qualification by performing well in certain other events throughout the season. In the current format, there are eight qualification tournaments in which both finalists qualify for the 16-player final, held at the end of the season. These eight qualifiers make up what is called the Championship Series, which are chosen by the Croquet Association as the eight consistently strongest Championship events (apart from the Open Championship).

In 2004, the Open Championship was combined with the World Championship.

== Presidents ==
Year	President
1905-1907	Lord Ebury
1908-1933	Lord Desborough
1933-1939	Trevor Williams
1939-1941	Viscount Doneraile
1946-1953	Sir Francis Colchester-Wemyss
1953-1967	Sir Compton Mackenzie
1967-1975	Maurice Reckitt
1975-1982	Edward Duffield
1982-2004	John Solomon
2004-2009	Bernard Neal
2009-2022	Quiller Barrett
2022-2025	Patricia Duke-Cox
2025-	Jonathan Isaacs
