= GB Snowsport =

British snowsports association

GB Snowsport, formerly the British Ski and Snowboard Federation, is the governing body of ski and snowboarding in the United Kingdom. It replaced Snowsport GB, which ceased operation in 2010. It is a full member of the International Ski and Snowboard Federation (FIS), the British Olympic Association and the British Paralympic Association, with origins in Ski Club of Great Britain. It sends athletes to Winter Olympic Games, and Winter Paralympic Games including medallists freestyle skier Isabel Atkin, para skiers Menna Fitzpatrick, Richard Burt (skier), Jade Etherington and Kelly Gallagher, para ice sledger Denise Smith, and snowboarders Jenny Jones and Billy Morgan. The organisation has national constituent associations Snowsport Cymru/Wales, Snowsport England, and Snowsport Scotland.

== See also ==
- Great Britain at the Olympics
- Great Britain at the Paralympics
- British Ski Academy
