= Hope Rotherham =

English croquet player

- Born: Louisa Eleanor Hope Mansell; 6 April 1894; Woolwich, Kent
- Died: 26 July 1981 (aged 87); Budleigh Salterton, Devon
- Spouse: Eustace Rotherham (m. 1925; died 1947)

Louisa Eleanor Hope Rotherham (née Mansell) (6 April 1894 – 26 July 1981) was a croquet player from England.

Mrs Eustace Rotherham, as she was known, was one of only three women to have won the Open Championship, winning in 1960. She won the Women's Championship seven times (1952, 1953, 1955, 1959, 1963, 1964 and 1969) and the Mixed Doubles nine times.

Mrs Rotherham represented England in the 1956 MacRobertson Shield, playing in three of the five test matches against New Zealand.

As an administrator, Mrs Rotherham served on the Council of the Croquet Association from 1954 to 1981 and was a Vice-President from 1974 to 1981.
