= Reginald Beaton =

English croquet player (1870 – 1925)

Reginald Charles John Beaton
- Born: 5 August 1870; Tulse Hill, Surrey
- Died: 2 January 1925 (aged 54); Marylebone, England
- Occupation: Croquet player
- Spouse: Lilias Gower (m. 1906)

Reginald Charles John Beaton (5 August 1870 – 2 January 1925) was a croquet player from England.

Reginald Beaton won the Open Championship twice (1904 and 1907) and the premier selection event, the Champion Cup, now called the President's Cup, in 1905. He won the Mixed Doubles in 1920 with his wife Lily Beaton.

As an administrator, Beaton served on the Council of the Croquet Association between 1903 and 1909.
