= Cyril Corbally =

Irish croquet player (1880 – 1946)

- Born: June 1880; Swords, County Dublin, Ireland
- Died: 10 March 1946 (aged 65); Newbridge, County Kildare, Ireland
- Occupation: Croquet player
- Spouse: Eleanor Colville Frankland (m. 1915)

Cyril Francis Corbally (1880 – 10 March 1946) of Rathbeale was a croquet player from Ireland.

Cyril Corbally won the Croquet Championship five times (1902, 1903, 1906, 1908 and 1913), the Men's Championship once (1926) and the premier selection event, the Champion Cup, now called the President's Cup, in 1913.

Corbally won the Championship of Ireland four times between 1901 and 1911, whilst his brother Herbert won the Championship of Ireland five times between 1913 and 1926.
