= Joan Warwick =

English croquet and field hockey player

Edith Joan Warwick
- Born: 13 June 1898; Peterborough, Northamptonshire
- Died: 4 July 1973 (aged 75); Budleigh Salterton, Devon

Edith Joan Warwick (13 June 1898 – 4 July 1973) was a croquet and hockey player from England.

Warwick won the Women's Championship five times (1960, 1962, 1965, 1966 and 1968) and represented England in the 1963 MacRobertson Shield tournament. Warwick represented England at hockey in the 1930s and captained an English side which toured Australia in 1927 and 1934.
