= Lily Gower =

Croquet player

- Born: Lilias Mary Gower; 5 October 1877; Wigtown, Scotland
- Died: 29 July 1959 (aged 81); Kensington, London
- Occupation: Croquet player
- Spouse: Reginald Beaton (m. 1906; died 1925)

Lily Gower, birth name Lilias Mary Gower (5 October 1877 — 29 July 1959) was a Welsh croquet player, a four-time winner of the Women's Championship. She was one of the three women who have won the Open Championship, winning in 1905 and was only one of three women to have won the premier selection event the Champion Cup, now President's Cup, in 1904.

She had won her very first public tournament at Budleigh Salterton, in 1898 and won the Ladies Championship for the next three years. In 1901, she started entering tournaments with men and in that year she won the Open Gold Medal, with a controversy. In semi-final her opponent (a man) accused her of "spooning". This sparkled heated discussions as to whether this was a gentlemanly way to do.

During her peak she was also three times Open Gold Medalist (contestants being both men and women) and even Men's Gold Medalist. The latter case was a result of confusion in rules: after "Open" and "Women's" were renamed into "Men's" and "Women's", the inadequately modified rules contained a loophole which allowed women to enter the "Men's Gold" contest.

The editorial in the July 6th, 1905 CA Gazette says "There can be little doubt that Miss Gower must be considered the best, as well as the most successful player of the day. To say, as our reporter said last week, that she is in a class by herself, is perhaps going rather too far. In sheer executive skill, in touch and in tactical knowledge, she is equalled, if not surpassed, by perhaps a dozen others; of these none excel her in steadiness and consistency. Miss Gower appears to possess exactly the right temperament for winning important events".

In 1906 she married Reginald Beaton, who was also a leading croquet player.

As an administrator she served on the Council of the Croquet Association between 1939 and 1954.
