= Maurice Reckitt =

British croquet player (1888–1980)

- Born: Maurice Benington Reckitt; 19 June 1888; Beverley, Yorkshire, England
- Died: 11 January 1980 (aged 91); Roehampton, London, England
- Education: St John's College, Oxford
- Spouse: Evelyn Aimée (m. 1920; died 1968)
- Relatives: Eva Collet Reckitt (sister)

Maurice Benington Reckitt (19 June 1888 – 11 January 1980) was a leading English Anglo-Catholic and Christian socialist writer. He edited Christendom: A Journal of Christian Sociology from 1931 to 1950. He founded the charity Christendom Trust.

== Life ==
Reckitt was born on 19 June 1888 in Beverley, Yorkshire, to Arthur Benington Reckitt and Helen Annie Thomas. His background was wealthy, with the family business Reckitt's of Hull manufacturing a well-known brand of bluing. His sister was Eva Collet Reckitt, founder of Collet's, the London bookshop. He graduated from St John's College, Oxford in 1911 with a second-class honours degree in history. At Oxford, and elsewhere throughout his life, he studied under Sir Ernest Barker, H. A. L. Fisher, G. K. Chesterton, A. R. Orage, John Neville Figgis, P. E. T. Widdrington, and V. A. Demant.

Early in life, Reckitt was a supporter of guild socialism and a founder of the National Guilds League. He presented the Scott Holland Memorial Lectures in 1946.

Reckitt was a leading player and croquet administrator winning the Men's Championship twice (1935 and 1946). Reckitt was on the Council of the Croquet Association between 1929 and 1975, serving as Chairman (1937 to 1939), Vice President (1962 to 1967) and President (1967 to 1975).

He died at the age of 91 on 11 January 1980 in Roehampton, London.

== Works ==
- The Meaning of National Guilds (1918) with C. E. Bechhofer
- Faith and Society: Study of the Structure, Outlook and Opportunity of the Christian Social Movement in Great Britain and the United States of America (1932)
- Religion in Social Action (1937)
- The Church and the World: Being Materials for the Historical Study of Christian Sociology in two volumes (1938) with Cyril E. Hudson
- Church and Society in England from 1800 (1940)
- The Vocation of England (1941) with J. V. Langmead Casserley
- As It Happened: An Autobiography (1941)
- Prospect for Christendom: Essays in Catholic Social Reconstruction (Faber and Faber, 1945), editor, with F. N. Davey, V. A. Demant, E. L. Mascall, T. S. Eliot, Philip Mairet, Patrick McLaughlin, T. M. Heron, Ruth Kenyon, David G. Peck, William G. Peck, Charles Smyth, Cyril E. Hudson, Henry Balmforth, Rosalinde Wilton, P. E. T. Widdrington
- The Christian in Politics (1946)
- Maurice to Temple: A Century of the Social Movement in the Church of England (Faber and Faber 1946), Holland Lectures 1946
- G. K. Chesterton: A Christian Prophet for England Today (1950) pamphlet
- Industry and Democracy (c. 1950) pamphlet
- The World and the Faith: Essays of a Christian Sociologist (1954)
- Croquet Today (Macdonald & Co 1954)
- Militant Here in Earth: Considerations on the Prophetic Function of the Church in the 20th Century (1957)
- P. E. T. Widdrington: A Study in Vocation and Versatility (1961)
- For Christ and the People: Studies of Four Socialist Priests and Prophets of the Church of England Between 1870–1930 (1968), editor, with Stephen Yeo, Kenneth Leach, and Robert Woodifield; on Thomas Hancock (1832–1903), Stewart Headlam (1847–1924), Charles Marson (1859–1914), Conrad Noel (1869–1942)
- Politics and the Faith

== See also ==
- G. D. H. Cole
