= V. A. Demant =

British priest and theologian (1893–1983)

The Reverend V. A. Demant FRAI
- Born: Vigo Auguste Demant; 8 November 1893; Newcastle upon Tyne, England
- Died: 3 March 1983 (aged 89); Headington, England
- Spouse: Marjorie Tickner (m. 1925)

Ecclesiastical career
- Religion: Christianity (Anglican)
- Church: Church of England
- Ordained: 1919 (deacon); 1920 (priest)
- Congregations: St John the Divine, Richmond; St Paul's Cathedral

Academic background
- Education: Armstrong College, Durham; Manchester College, Oxford; Exeter College, Oxford
- Influences: Nikolai Berdyaev; R. G. Collingwood; Christopher Dawson; Jacques Maritain

Academic work
- Discipline: Theology
- Sub-discipline: Moral theology
- School or tradition: Anglo-Catholicism
- Institutions: Christ Church, Oxford
- Influenced: William Temple

Vigo Auguste Demant FRAI (1893 – 1983), known as V. A. Demant, was an English Anglican priest, theologian, and social commentator. He was one of the 14 committee members who served on the Wolfenden Report on Homosexual Offences and Prostitution.

== Early life and education ==
Demant was born on 8 November 1893 in Newcastle upon Tyne, England. He was educated in Newcastle, England and Tournan, France. He studied engineering at Armstrong College, Durham. He then studied theology at Manchester College, Oxford.

== Career ==
=== Ordained ministry and academia ===
Demant had originally intended to become a Unitarian minister, but became attracted to Catholicism while studying at the University of Oxford and was received into the Church of England in 1918. He trained for Holy Orders at Ely Theological College, an Anglo-Catholic theological college in Ely, Cambridgeshire.

Demant was ordained as a deacon in 1919 and as a priest in 1920. He served curacies at St Thomas the Martyr's Church, Oxford; St Michael and All Angels Church, Summertown, Oxford; St Nicholas' Church, Plumstead, London; and All Saints' Church, Highgate, London. From 1929 to 1933, he was an assistant priest at St Silas Church, Kentish Town.

Demant became Vicar of St John the Divine, Richmond, in 1933 and nine years later he became a canon of St Paul's Cathedral. He served as canon chancellor of the cathedral from 1942 to 1948 and as canon treasurer from 1948 to 1949. He was a canon of Christ Church, Oxford, and Regius Professor of Moral and Pastoral Theology at the University of Oxford from 1949 to 1971.

=== Other work ===
Demant served on the Committee on Homosexual Offences and Prostitution. The committee's report, known as the Wolfenden report was published in September 1957 and recommended that "homosexual behaviour between consenting adults in private should no longer be a criminal offence."

Demant was a regular broadcaster on the BBC's Third Programme in the 1950s. He supported Maurice Reckitt in founding the Christendom Trust to encourage and fund research into the application of Christian social thought.

== Later life ==
Demant retired from his post at Oxford to a cottage in Headington, Oxfordshire, in 1971. He died there on 3 March 1983 at the age of 89.

== Writings ==
- The Just Price (1930)
- This Unemployment: Disaster or Opportunity? (1932)
- God, Man and Society: An Introduction to Christian Sociology (1933)
- Christian Polity (1936)
- The Religious Prospect (1939)
- Theology of Society: More Essays in Christian Polity (1947)
- Our Culture: Its Christian Roots and Present Crisis (1947)
- The Responsibility and Scope of Pastoral Theology To-Day (1950)
- Religion and the Decline of Capitalism (1952)
- The Elements of Christianity (1955)
- A Two-Way Religion (1957)
- Christian Sex Ethics (1963)
- The Idea of a Natural Order (1966)
- Why the Christian Priesthood Is Male (1972)

== See also ==
- David Nicholls (theologian)
- Maurice Reckitt

Academic offices
Preceded by Robert Mortimer	Regius Professor of Moral and Pastoral Theology; 1949–1971	Succeeded by Peter Baelz
Other offices
Preceded by Maurice Reckitt	Scott Holland Memorial Lecturer; 1949	Succeeded by Donald M. MacKinnon
