= Triple Peel =

A Triple Peel (TP) is a standard manoeuvre in top-level games of association croquet.

To peel a ball in croquet is to send a ball, other than the striker's ball, through its next hoop, thereby scoring a point for that ball. The ball in question is known as the "peelee". A prerequisite for a triple peel is that the peelee's next hoop is 4-back (so it has three hoops still to run). The striker, during a single turn, peels the peelee through its last three hoops and then pegs it out. Because a ball cannot be roqueted more than once without the striker's ball first running a hoop itself, the three peels are always performed in the course of making a break for the striker's ball, often a break that completes the full circuit of 12 hoops.

A triple peel can be performed either on the striker's partner ball, or on one of the opponent's balls; the latter case is referred to as a Triple Peel on Opponent (TPO).

The significance of a triple peel is the rule in advanced association croquet that defines penalties for a player who runs their ball through the 4-back hoop. The penalty is particularly severe when 4-back is run during the same break as 1-back, by the first of the player's two balls: in this case, at the end of the turn, the opponent is allowed to take the innings by selecting either of their balls and lifting it next to another ball on the lawn, as if the ball had been roqueted. Because conceding a contact in this way creates a good chance of losing the game, players will generally end a break before running 4-back. This means that it is common for a player to start an all-round break in a position where another ball on the lawn has 4-back as its next hoop.

In a triple peel on the partner ball, the objective is to get the striker's ball all the way round the lawn, and the partner through its last three hoops, and then peg both balls out, thus winning the game. In top level play this is sometimes achieved as early as the fifth turn of the game.

In a triple peel on the opponent, the objective is to peg out the opponent's ball. This is usually attempted when the opponent's other ball is still on its first hoop. On successful completion the striker has both balls on the lawn, while the opponent has only one ball, positioned at hoop 1. Although peeling scores points for the opponent, pegging one of the opponent's balls out puts them at a considerable disadvantage because it is much harder to make a break with one remaining ball when its partner has been eliminated from the game.

== Sextuple peel ==
In recent years the best players have perfected the triple peel, to the extent that leaving a ball at 4-back is considered risky. Such players may well end a break at 1-back, hoping to complete the game with a sextuple peel (peeling the partner through its last six hoops). The sextuple peel is now considered one of the highest achievements in croquet, performed only by a handful of top international players. The triple peel, by contrast, is the highest aspiration of many good players at club level.
