= Ski Club of Great Britain =

- Formation: May 6, 1903; 123 years ago
- Headquarters: 3.25 Canterbury Court, Kennington Park 1-3 Brixton Road, London, SW9 6DE
- Chairman: Angus Maciver
- Website: skiclub.co.uk

The Ski Club of Great Britain is a not-for-profit recreational snow sports club. It was founded on 6 May 1903 during a meeting at the Hotel Café Royal in London. Until the 1960s, the Ski Club of Great Britain was responsible for British Alpine ski racing teams.

In April 2020, the Ski Club had about 23,000 members, making it the largest membership-based snow sports club in the UK.

== History ==
The aims of the club, as outlined at the very first meeting, are to encourage people to learn to ski; help members to improve; get more enjoyment from skiing; and bring together people who are interested in the sport.

Before World War I, the club was primarily concerned with cross country (Nordic) skiing. The first official Ski Championship of Great Britain was held in Saanenmöser, Switzerland in 1914. The results were based on performance in cross country and ski jumping.

The first British Ski Championships to include Alpine skiing took place in Wengen on 6-7 January 1921. The championships were organised by Sir Arnold Lunn on behalf of the Ski Club. Sir Arnold Lunn was a central figure in this period of the Ski Club's history and the development of ski racing, setting the first modern slalom in Murren in 1922 and helping to persuade the International Olympic Committee to include downhill and slalom in the 1936 Winter Olympic Games in Garmisch-Partenkirchen.

In the mid-1920s, the Ski Club began providing snow and weather reports for national newspapers.

The National Ski Federation of Great Britain (later the British Ski and Snowboard Federation) was founded in 1964 as the governing body for alpine skiing in Britain. The Ski Club of Great Britain thereafter became aligned more closely with recreational skiing.

== Member Services ==
=== Ski Club Leaders ===
The Ski Club sent its first representatives to the Alps in 1928. The Ski Club and its leaders began to organize touring parties during the 1930s. These were to teach people to ski and keep them entertained in the evenings. The Ski Club currently operates a volunteer-leading service in around 17 resorts worldwide. In France, the club operates an 'Instructor Led Guiding Service' due to legal issues with volunteer leaders.

=== Ski Club Freshtracks ===
The Ski Club has a long history of running ski holidays. Family holidays were first introduced in the 1970s, and later extended to include adult and over-50s holidays; and Peak Experience holidays. In 1996–97 the holiday's programme expanded once more with the incorporation of the off-piste ski company ‘Freshtracks’. This increased the off-piste programme and included many holidays with qualified mountain guides. On holidays a rating system is employed to match skiers of similar abilities. This rating system is a continuation of that used during the early decades of the club's existence.

=== Ski Industry Involvement ===
The Ski Club publishes an annual Consumer Research Report, advises the media on snow sports-related matters, and raises awareness of British athletes and events through its website and social media channels.

=== The Pery Medal ===
The Pery medal was instituted in 1929 by the Hon. E. C. Pery, later the Earl of Limerick, DSO and President of the Ski Club of Great Britain (1925–27) and was first awarded in 1930. Previous recipients of the medal include inspirational explorers, ski pioneers, Olympic and Paralympic champions, scientists and authors. Arnold Lunn was the first to be presented with the Pery medal in 1930 (he was also knighted for services to British skiing and Anglo-Swiss relations in 1952) and Sir Ranulph Fiennes, Frans Klammer, Konrad Bartelski, Alain Baxter and Hermann Maier feature among some of the well-known recipients.

=== Skiclub.co.uk ===
In 1995, the Ski Club launched the first ever winter sports website; www.skiclub.co.uk. Despite constantly increasing competition, it remains one of the leading skiing websites. Relaunched in 2000, the website was transformed from a ‘brochure’ website into a fully interactive site. Ski Club TV, the first dedicated snow sports internet TV channel, was launched in 2006.

=== Ski Club Insurance ===
The Ski Club of Great Britain has provided snow sports insurance for over 40 years. Insurance policies are designed by experts specifically for snow sports enthusiasts.

== Publications ==
In 1905 the Ski Club began publishing the British Ski Year Book. This provided a record of changes in equipment, clothes, facilities, ski techniques, and holidays over the decades. In 1972 the British Ski Year Book became Ski Survey. In 1997 Ski Survey became Ski+board Magazine and was redesigned. Ski+board is published five times in the winter months, in September, October, December, February and March (this fifth issue is online only). There is also a summer version of the magazine, called Elevation.

=== Editors ===
The following persons have been editor-in-chief of the magazine:

- 2014–present: Colin Nicholson
- 2001–2014: Arnie Wilson
- 1974–1992: Elizabeth Hussey
- 1919–1974: Arnold Lunn

== Notable Presidents ==
- Air Commodore Hugh Dowding (Later Air Chief Marshal The Lord Dowding) (1924–25)
- Gerald Seligman (1927–28)
- Sir Arnold Lunn (1928–30)
- Sir Claud Schuster GCB (later Lord Schuster) (1932–34)
- Sir Malcolm Eve GBE MC QC (1950)
- The Earl of Limerick (1974–81)
- Alan Blackshaw (1997–2003)
- Frank Gardner (journalist) (2011–2017)
- Chemmy Alcott (2017–)
