= MacRobertson International Croquet Shield =

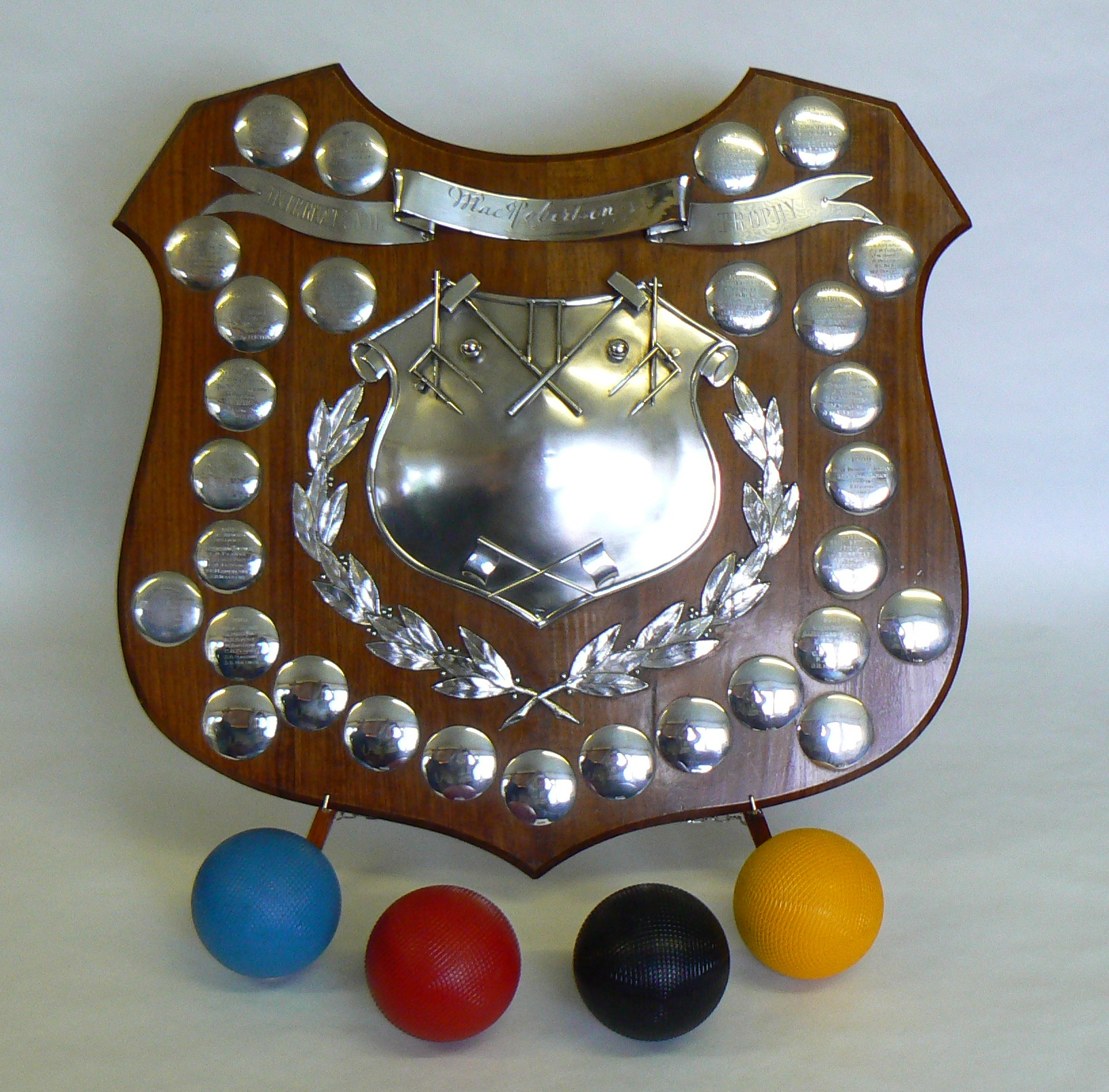
The MacRobertson Shield

The MacRobertson International Croquet Shield is the premier croquet team event in the world. It is currently competed for by Australia, England, New Zealand and the United States. It is known affectionately as the MacRob or just the Mac.

The series is now played in rotation between the competing countries every three or four years.

The most recent series was held in 2026 in England; it was won by England.

The next series will be held in 2030 in New Zealand.

== History ==
The competition is named after Australian confectionery maker and philanthropist, Sir Macpherson Robertson. He enlisted returned World War I veterans to take up concessions for his products and encouraged them to try croquet also, believing it to be a teaching aid for developing skills in self-discipline and risk management. Eventually, a pool of players were participating in regular tournaments. In 1925, with a growing interest in the sport, he established the MacRobertson Shield, an international tournament of croquet "Tests" between Australia and England. The Victorian Croquet Association sent a team of four players to England to contest the inaugural tournament. England won easily and Robertson presented the Shield personally.

In 1927-8 an England team played in Australia and was narrowly defeated. In 1930, New Zealand was invited to participate in a series between themselves and Australia, with Australia winning comfortably; the first triangular series was then held in 1935 in Melbourne as part of the Melbourne centenary celebrations. In 1993, a United States team was admitted into the tournament.

Between 1974 and 2010 the team representing the Croquet Association was named "Great Britain" and in two series "Great Britain and Ireland", because the teams included players from Scotland, Wales and Ireland. Following the introduction of the World Croquet Federation World Association Croquet Team Championship in 2010, the team was named "England" from the 2013-14 series and now only includes English qualified players.

Each team is represented by six players and since 1996 each test has been the best of 21 matches comprising 12 singles and 9 doubles.

== The 2026 Series ==
The 2026 Series was played across four venues in England in July and August 2026 and was won by England over New Zealand, the United States and Australia.

,

Pos	Country	Pld	W	L	GF	GA	GD	(England)	(New Zealand)	(United States)	(Australia)
1	England	3	3	0	42	18	+24	—	11–7	15–6	16–5
2	New Zealand	3	2	1	37	23	+14	7–11	—	14–7	16–5
3	USA (United States)	3	1	2	30	33	−3	6–15	7–14	—	17–4
4	Australia	3	0	3	14	49	−35	5–16	5–16	4–17	—

== The 2022 Series ==
The 2022 Series was played at Cairnlea, Melbourne, Australia in November 2022 and was won by England over Australia, New Zealand and the United States.

Pos	Country	Pld	W	L	GF	GA	GD	(England)	(Australia)	(New Zealand)	(United States)
1	England	3	3	0	40	23	+17	—	13–8	11–10	16–5
2	Australia	3	2	1	33	30	+3	8–13	—	11–10	14–7
3	New Zealand	3	1	2	29	27	+2	10–11	10–11	—	9–5
4	USA (United States)	3	0	3	17	39	−22	5–16	7–14	5–9	—

== The 2017 Series ==
The 2017 Series was played at Mission Hills Country Club in Rancho Mirage, California, USA and won by Australia over England, New Zealand and the United States. The tournament was held over three five-day tests and 21 matches.

Pos	Country	Pld	W	L	GF	GA	GD	(Australia)	(England)	(New Zealand)	(United States)
1	Australia	3	3	0	40	23	+17	—	12–9	14–7	14–7
2	England	3	2	1	38	23	+15	9–12	—	15–4	14–7
3	New Zealand	3	1	2	22	39	−17	7–14	4–15	—	11–10
4	USA (United States)	3	0	3	24	39	−15	7–14	7–14	10–11	—

== The 2013-14 Series ==
The 2013-14 series was contested in New Zealand across four venues, and was won by New Zealand.

30 December 2013 - 3 January 2014: New Zealand v USA and England v Australia at United Croquet Club, Christchurch

- England 16 - 5 Australia
- New Zealand 20 - 1 USA

5 - 9 January: England v USA at Te Mata Croquet Club, Havelock North and New Zealand v Australia at Marewa Croquet Club, Napier

- England 18 - 3 USA
- New Zealand 15 - 4 Australia

11 - 15 January: New Zealand v England and Australia v USA at Mt Maunganui Croquet Club, Tauranga

- New Zealand 13 - 7 England
- Australia 17 - 4 USA

Pos	Country	Pld	W	L	GF	GA	GD	(New Zealand)	(England)	(Australia)	(United States)
1	New Zealand	3	3	0	48	12	+36	—	13–7	15–4	20–1
2	England	3	2	1	41	21	+20	7–13	—	16–5	18–3
3	Australia	3	1	2	26	35	−9	4–15	5–16	—	17–4
4	USA (United States)	3	0	3	8	55	−47	1–20	3–18	4–17	—

== The 2010 Series ==
The 2010 Shield was contested in Great Britain, across five venues, and was won by Great Britain.

6 – 10 August: Great Britain v USA at Bowdon, Greater Manchester and Australia v New Zealand at Heaton Park, Manchester

- Great Britain 12 - 9 USA
- Australia 8 - 13 New Zealand

12 – 16 August: Great Britain v New Zealand at Nottingham and Australia v USA at Roehampton

- Great Britain 11 - 10 New Zealand
- Australia 7 - 14 USA

18 – 22 August: Great Britain v Australia and New Zealand v USA both at Surbiton

- Great Britain 14 - 7 Australia
- USA 5 - 16 New Zealand

Pos	Country	Pld	W	L	GF	GA	GD	(United Kingdom)	(New Zealand)	(United States)	(Australia)
1	Great Britain (United Kingdom)	3	3	0	37	26	+11	—	11–10	12–9	14–7
2	New Zealand	3	2	1	39	24	+15	10–11	—	16–5	13–8
3	USA (United States)	3	1	2	28	35	−7	9–12	5–16	—	14–7
4	Australia	3	0	3	22	41	−19	7–14	8–13	7–14	—

== The 2006 Series ==
The 2006 series was contested at Rich River, Moama, New South Wales and Shepparton, Victoria, Australia, and was won by Great Britain.

Pos	Country	Pld	W	L	GF	GA	GD	(United Kingdom)	(Australia)	(United States)	(New Zealand)
1	Great Britain (United Kingdom)	3	3	0	53	10	+43	—	19–2	19–2	15–6
2	Australia	3	2	1	27	36	−9	2–19	—	14–7	11–10
3	USA (United States)	3	1	2	22	41	−19	2–19	7–14	—	13–8
4	New Zealand	3	0	3	24	39	−15	6–15	10–11	8–13	—

== The 2003 Series ==
The 2003 series was contested at The National Croquet Center, West Palm Beach, Florida, USA, and was won by Great Britain.

Pos	Country	Pld	W	L	GF	GA	GD	(United Kingdom)	(Australia)	(United States)	(New Zealand)
1	Great Britain (United Kingdom)	3	3	0	41	22	+19	—	15–6	15–6	11–10
2	Australia	3	2	1	32	31	+1	6–15	—	11–10	15–6
3	USA (United States)	3	1	2	28	35	−7	6–15	10–11	—	12–9
4	New Zealand	3	0	3	25	38	−13	10–11	6–15	9–12	—

== The 2000 Series ==
The 2000 series was contested at The United Croquet Club, Christchurch, New Zealand, and was won by Great Britain.

Pos	Country	Pld	W	L	GF	GA	GD	(United Kingdom)	(New Zealand)	(United States)	(Australia)
1	Great Britain (United Kingdom)	3	3	0	50	13	+37	—	11–10	19–2	20–1
2	New Zealand	3	2	1	37	26	+11	10–11	—	13–8	14–7
3	USA (United States)	3	1	2	21	42	−21	2–19	8–13	—	11–10
4	Australia	3	0	3	18	45	−27	1–20	7–14	10–11	—

== The 1996 Series ==
The 1996 series was contested in England across four venues and was won by Great Britain.

Pos	Country	Pld	W	L	GF	GA	GD	(United Kingdom)	(New Zealand)	(Australia)	(United States)
1	Great Britain (United Kingdom)	3	3	0	49	14	+35	—	14–7	15–6	20–1
2	New Zealand	3	2	1	33	30	+3	7–14	—	14–7	12–9
3	Australia	3	1	2	27	36	−9	6–15	7–14	—	14–7
4	USA (United States)	3	0	3	17	46	−29	1–20	9–12	7–14	—

== The 1993 Series ==
The 1993 series was contested at Rich River, Moama, New South Wales, Australia and was won by Great Britain.

In the first series each country played each other country in a nine-match test match. The top two countries after the first series played a 21 match final and the bottom two played a 21 match third place play off.

Pos	Country	Pld	W	L	GF	GA	GD	(United Kingdom)	(New Zealand)	(Australia)	(United States)
1	Great Britain (United Kingdom)	3	3	0	21	5	+16	—	6–2	6–3	9–0
2	New Zealand	3	2	1	16	7	+9	2–6	—	6–1	8–0
3	Australia	3	1	2	10	15	−5	3–6	1–6	—	6–3
4	USA (United States)	3	0	3	3	23	−20	0–9	0–8	3–6	—

=== Third Place Play Off ===
- Australia 12 - 6 USA

=== Final ===
- Great Britain 17 - 3 New Zealand

== The 1990 Series ==
The 1990 series was contested in New Zealand across three venues and was won by Great Britain.

Pos	Country	Pld	W	L	GF	GA	GD	(United Kingdom)	(New Zealand)	(Australia)
1	Great Britain (United Kingdom)	2	2	0	30	12	+18	—	12–9	18–3
2	New Zealand	2	1	1	22	17	+5	9–12	—	13–5
3	Australia	2	0	2	8	31	−23	3–18	5–13	—

== The 1986 Series ==
The 1986 series was contested in England across nine venues and was won by New Zealand.

Pos	Country	Pld	W	L	GF	GA	GD
1	New Zealand	6	5	1	36	18	+18
2	Great Britain (United Kingdom)	6	3	3	29	25	+4
3	Australia	6	1	5	16	38	−22

W/L	(Australia)	(United Kingdom)	(New Zealand)
Australia	—	4–5	1–7
Australia	—	2–7	2–7
Australia	—	5–4	1–7
Great Britain (United Kingdom)	5–4	—	4–5
Great Britain (United Kingdom)	7–2	—	3–6
Great Britain (United Kingdom)	4–5	—	6–3
New Zealand	7–1	5–4	—
New Zealand	7–2	6–3	—
New Zealand	7–1	3–6	—

== The 1982 Series ==
The 1982 series was contested in Australia across three venues and was won by Great Britain.

Pos	Country	Pld	W	L	GF	GA	GD
1	Great Britain (United Kingdom)	6	5	1	31	23	+8
2	Australia	6	4	2	28	25	+3
3	New Zealand	6	0	6	21	32	−11

W/L	(Australia)	(United Kingdom)	(New Zealand)
Australia	—	2–7	5–4
Australia	—	5–4	6–2
Australia	—	4–5	6–3
Great Britain (United Kingdom)	7–2	—	5–4
Great Britain (United Kingdom)	4–5	—	5–4
Great Britain (United Kingdom)	5–4	—	5–4
New Zealand	4–5	4–5	—
New Zealand	6–2	4–5	—
New Zealand	3–6	4–5	—

== The 1979 Series ==
The 1979 series was contested in New Zealand across nine venues and was won by New Zealand.

Pos	Country	Pld	W	L	GF	GA	GD
1	New Zealand	6	6	0	45	9	+36
2	Great Britain (United Kingdom)	6	3	3	32	22	+10
3	Australia	6	0	6	4	50	−46

W/L	(Australia)	(United Kingdom)	(New Zealand)
Australia	—	2–7	0–9
Australia	—	2–7	0–9
Australia	—	0–9	0–9
Great Britain (United Kingdom)	7–2	—	4–5
Great Britain (United Kingdom)	7–2	—	3–6
Great Britain (United Kingdom)	9–0	—	2–7
New Zealand	7–1	5–4	—
New Zealand	9–0	6–3	—
New Zealand	9–0	7–2	—

== The 1974 Series ==
The 1974 series was contested in England across eight venues and was won by Great Britain.

Pos	Country	Pld	W	L	GF	GA	GD
1	Great Britain (United Kingdom)	6	6	0	39	15	+24
2	New Zealand	6	2	4	24	30	−6
3	Australia	6	1	5	18	36	−18

W/L	(Australia)	(United Kingdom)	(New Zealand)
Australia	—	2–7	5–4
Australia	—	4–5	4–5
Australia	—	1–8	2–7
Great Britain (United Kingdom)	7–2	—	7–2
Great Britain (United Kingdom)	5–4	—	6–3
Great Britain (United Kingdom)	8–1	—	6–3
New Zealand	4–5	2–7	—
New Zealand	5–4	3–6	—
New Zealand	7–2	3–6	—

== The 1969 Series ==
The 1969 series was contested in Australia across two venues and was won by England.

Pos	Country	Pld	W	L	GF	GA	GD
1	England	6	6	0	47	7	+40
2	New Zealand	6	3	3	27	27	0
3	Australia	6	0	6	7	47	−40

W/L	(England)	(New Zealand)	(Australia)
England	—	7–2	8–1
England	—	7–2	8–1
England	—	9–0	8–1
New Zealand	2–7	—	7–2
New Zealand	2–7	—	8–1
New Zealand	0–9	—	1–8
Australia	1–8	2–7	—
Australia	1–8	1–8	—
Australia	1–8	1–8	—

== The 1963 Series ==
The 1963 series was contested in New Zealand across nine venues and was won by England.

Pos	Country	Pld	W	L	GF	GA	GD
1	England	6	6	0	45	9	+36
2	Australia	6	2	4	17	35	−18
3	New Zealand	6	1	5	17	35	−18

W/L	(England)	(Australia)	(New Zealand)
England	—	7–2	7–2
England	—	8–1	7–2
England	—	9–0	7–2
Australia	2–7	—	6–1
Australia	1–8	—	5–4
Australia	0–9	—	3–6
New Zealand	2–7	1–6	—
New Zealand	2–7	4–5	—
New Zealand	2–7	6–3	—

== The 1956 Series ==
The 1956 series was contested between England and New Zealand in England over five test matches across five venues and was won by England 5-0.

13 - 15 June 1956: England v New Zealand at the Sussex County Croquet Club, Southwick.

- England 6 - 3 New Zealand

23 - 26 June 1956: England v New Zealand at the Nottingham Croquet Club, Nottingham.

- England 6 - 2 New Zealand

19 - 21 July 1956: England v New Zealand at the Hurlingham Club, London.

- England 9 - 0 New Zealand

20 - 22 August 1956: England v New Zealand at the Roehampton Club, London.

- England 8 - 1 New Zealand

18 - 20 September 1956: England v New Zealand at the Budleigh Salterton Croquet Club, Budleigh Salterton.

- England 7 - 2 New Zealand

== The 1950-51 Series ==
The 1950-51 series was contested between England and New Zealand in New Zealand over three test matches across three venues and was won by New Zealand 2-1.

23 - 26 November 1950: New Zealand v England at the Mount Hobson Croquet Club, Auckland

- New Zealand 4 - 3 England

11 - 13 December 1950: New Zealand v England at the Waimarie Croquet Club, Lower Hutt, Wellington

- New Zealand 5 - 2 England

3 - 5 January 1951: New Zealand v England at Dunedin

- New Zealand 2 - 4 England

== The 1937 Series ==
The 1937 series was contested between England and Australia in England over five test matches across five venues and was won by England 5-0.

12 - 13 July 1937: England v Australia at the Hurlingham Club, London

- England 6 - 0 Australia

23 - 24 July 1937: England v Australia at the Cheltenham Croquet Club

- England 6 - 0 Australia

30 - 31 July 1937: England v Australia at Buxton, Derbyshire

- England 5 - 1 Australia

20 - 21 August 1937: England v Australia at the Roehampton Club, London

- England 6 - 0 Australia

4 - 6 September 1937: England v Australia at the Sussex County Croquet Club

- England 4 - 2 Australia

== The 1935 Series ==
The 1935 series was contested in Melbourne, Australia and was won by Australia.

Pos	Country	Pld	W	D	L	GF	GA	GD
1	Australia	6	4	2	0	27	9	+18
2	England	6	3	2	1	20	16	+4
3	New Zealand	6	0	0	6	7	29	−22

W/L	(Australia)	(England)	(New Zealand)
Australia	—	4–2	6–0
Australia	—	3–3	5–1
Australia	—	3–3	6–0
England	2–4	—	4–2
England	3–3	—	4–2
England	3–3	—	4–2
New Zealand	0–6	2–4	—
New Zealand	1–5	2–4	—
New Zealand	0–6	2–4	—

== The 1930 Series ==
The 1930 series was contested between Australia and New Zealand in Australia over three test matches in Melbourne and was won by Australia 3-0.

12 - 15 January 1930: Australia v New Zealand at the Warleigh Club, North Brighton, Melbourne

- Australia 8 - 1 New Zealand

17 - 20 January 1930: Australia v New Zealand at the Warleigh Club, North Brighton, Melbourne

- Australia 8 - 1 New Zealand

23 - 25 January 1930: Australia v New Zealand at the Warleigh Club, North Brighton, Melbourne

- Australia 6 - 3 New Zealand

== The 1927-28 Series ==
The 1927-28 series was contested between Australia and England in Australia over three test matches in Melbourne and was won by Australia on the basis of winning most game (20-19).

16 - 17 December 1927: Australia v England at the Warleigh Club, North Brighton, Melbourne

- Australia 4(9) - 2(5) England

6 - 8 January 1928: Australia v England at the Warleigh Club, North Brighton, Melbourne

- Australia 2(4) - 4(9) England

12 - 14 January 1928: Australia v ZealEngland nd at the Warleigh Club, North Brighton, Melbourne

- Australia 3(6) - 3(6) England

== The 1925 Series ==
The 1925 series was contested between England and Australia in England over three test matches across three venues and was won by England 3-0.

26 - 27 June 1925: England v Australia at the Roehampton Club, London

- England 6 - 0 Australia

24 - 25 July 1925: England v Australia at the Cheltenham Croquet Club

- England 6 - 0 Australia

4 - 5 September 1925: England v Australia at the Sussex County Croquet Club

- England 5 - 1 Australia

== Past results ==
Year	Host	Countries	Winner
1925	England	England, Australia	England
1927–28	Australia	England, Australia	Australia
1930	Australia	New Zealand, Australia	Australia
1935	New Zealand	England, Australia, New Zealand	Australia
1937	England	England, Australia	England
1950–51	New Zealand	England, New Zealand	New Zealand
1956	England	England, New Zealand	England
1963	New Zealand	England, Australia, New Zealand	England
1969	Australia	England, Australia, New Zealand	England
1974	Great Britain	Great Britain, Australia, New Zealand	Great Britain
1979	New Zealand	Great Britain, Australia, New Zealand	New Zealand
1982	Australia	Great Britain, Australia, New Zealand	Great Britain
1986	Great Britain	Great Britain, Australia, New Zealand	New Zealand
1990	New Zealand	Australia, New Zealand, Great Britain & Ireland	Great Britain & Ireland
1993	Australia	Australia, New Zealand, Great Britain & Ireland, USA	Great Britain & Ireland
1996	Great Britain	Australia, New Zealand, Great Britain, USA	Great Britain
2000	New Zealand	Australia, New Zealand, Great Britain, USA	Great Britain
2003	United States	Australia, New Zealand, Great Britain, USA	Great Britain
2006	Australia	Australia, New Zealand, Great Britain, USA	Great Britain
2010	Great Britain	Australia, New Zealand, Great Britain, USA	Great Britain
2014	New Zealand	Australia, England, New Zealand, USA	New Zealand
2017	United States	Australia, England, New Zealand, USA	Australia
2022	Australia	Australia, England, New Zealand, USA	England
2026	England	Australia, England, New Zealand, USA	England

== Records ==
- Most series appearances: 9
  ° John Prince (NZ), 1963–2003
  ° Robert Fulford (GB/England), 1990–2026
- Most titles: 8
  ° Robert Fulford (GB/England), 1990–2026
- Most test matches played: 39
  ° John Prince (NZ), 1963–2003
- Most matches played: 126
  ° Robert Fulford (GB/England), 1990–2026

== See also ==
- World Croquet Federation
