= Bourne Eau =

River in Lincolnshire, England

Coordinates: 52.76565°N 0.38153°W

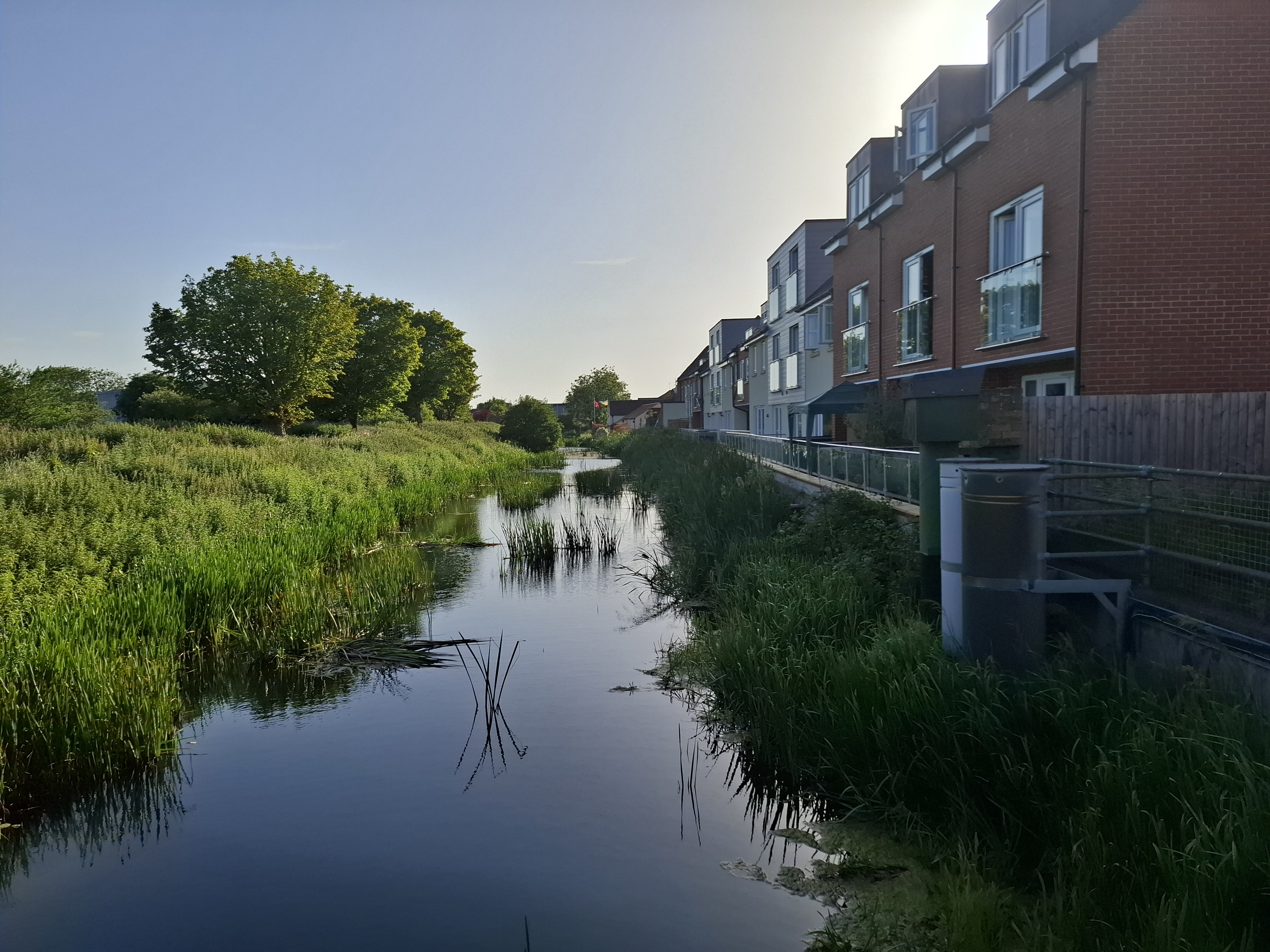
- The location of the terminus of the Bourne Eau Navigation at Bourne
- Interactive map of Bourne Eau

Specifications
- Length: 3.5 miles (5.6 km)
- Original number of locks: 2
- Status: Unnavigable

History
- Original owner: Bourne Eau trustees
- Date of act: 1781
- Date closed: 1860s

Geography
- Start point: St Peters Pool, Bourne
- End point: Tongue End
- Connects to: River Glen, Lincolnshire

Bourne Eau is a short river which rises from an artesian spring in the town of Bourne in Lincolnshire, England, and flows in an easterly direction to join the River Glen at Tongue End. Within the town, it once powered three water mills, one of which is now a heritage centre. At Eastgate, it becomes much wider as it was navigable in the 18th and 19th centuries, and this was the location of the terminal basin. Below the town it is an embanked river, as its normal level is higher than that of the surrounding Fens. Navigation ceased in the 1860s and the river now forms an important part of the drainage system that enables the surrounding fen land to be used for agriculture.

The artesian spring is fed by a limestone aquifer, which has been extensively used to supply drinking water to the locality and to Spalding. After a period of low rainfall in the late 1980s, the spring and hence the upper river dried up completely. A remediation project was implemented in 1992/93 to repair wild boreholes, where artesian water was uncontrollably running to waste. 30 boreholes were plugged or repaired, and water returned to the spring and river.

The river divides North Fen from South Fen. Both were enclosed in the 1770s, and surplus water from the North Fen was fed to the South Forty-Foot Drain. Steam pumping was introduced in 1845, and the drainage is the responsibility of the Black Sluice Internal Drainage Board (IDB). To drain the South Fen Gilbert Heathcote's tunnel was constructed to take water under the River Glen to the Counter Drain. Various engines were used to pump water through the tunnel, but after the failure of a gas engine in 1942, a new pumping station was built, to pump water into the River Glen. Drainage in the South Fen is now the responsibility of the Welland and Deepings IDB.

== Course ==
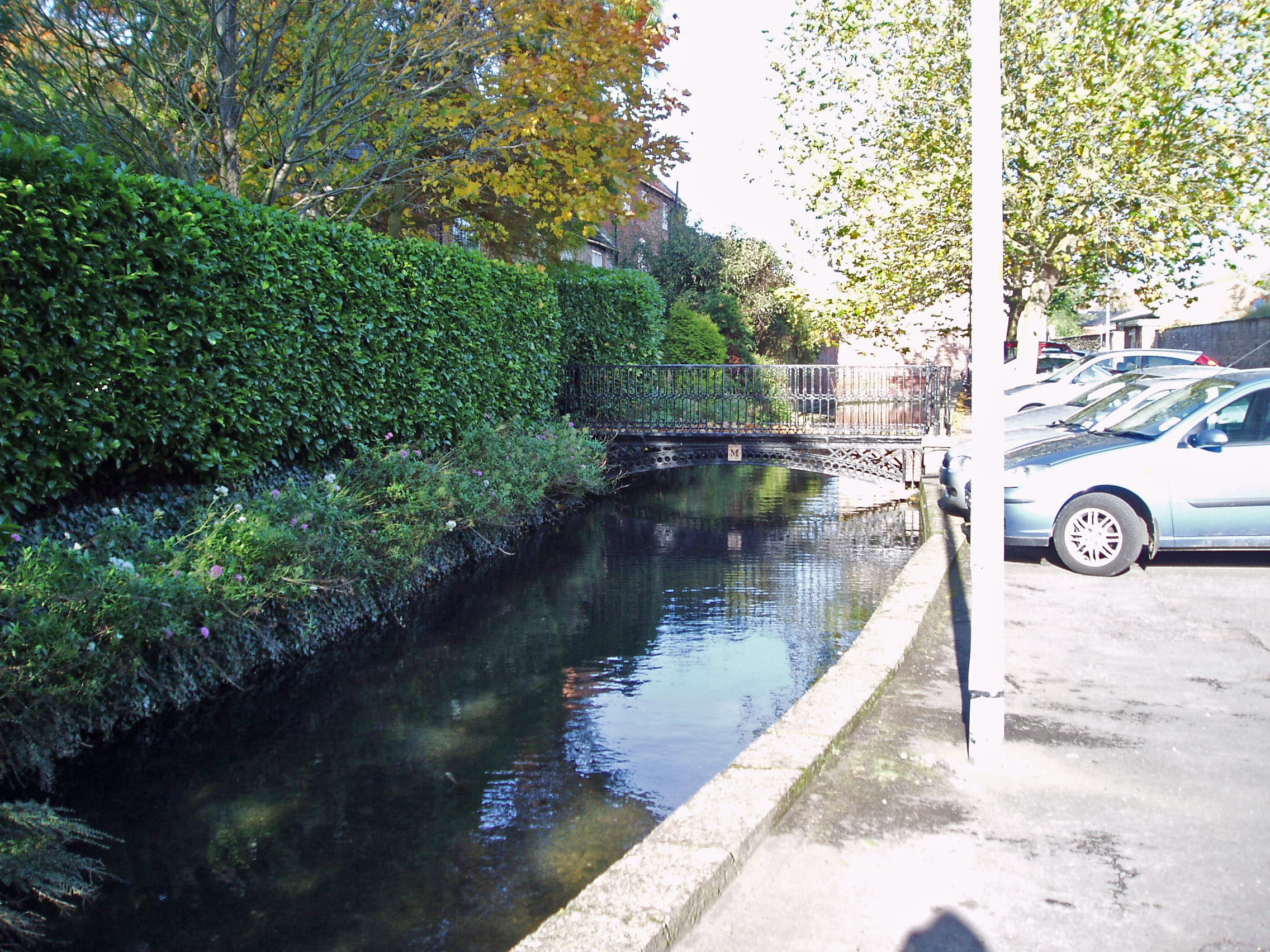
Bourne Eau outside the Abbey Church at Bourne. The iron bridge is dated 1832.

The town of Bourne is surrounded by the River Glen. To the west, the East Glen and West Glen flow from north to south, and become one river to the south of the town. They then flow in a north-easterly direction to the east of the town. Bourne sits over a layer of Middle Jurassic limestone, some 100 feet (30 m) thick, which dips to the east, and is covered by Upper Estuarine mudrocks, which confine groundwater within the limestone layer.

Bourne Eau rises in The Wellhead, otherwise known as St Peter's Pool, in Bourne. The Wellhead is a natural artesian spring, rising from the limestone some 165 feet (50 m) below the land surface. It once formed the source of the water defences for Bourne Castle as well as the power for the town's three mills. From the Wellhead, a branch flows to the east, along the southern edge of the castle site, while another flows north, then east and south, enclosing the castle site and Wellhead Gardens to rejoin the first branch near Baldock's Mill. A culvert carries the water under South Street, and it flows along the edge of Church Lane, where it is crossed by a small cast-iron bridge with gates, providing rear access to Bourne Eau House. It carries the date 1832. On the other side of Church Lane is the parish church of St Peter and St Paul, a grade I listed structure that was originally the chapel for an Arrouaisian order of Canons founded in 1138.

At the north end of Church Lane, another culvert takes it under the gardens of the vicarage. This culvert and the South Street culvert are quite old, since they appear on the 1888 Ordnance Survey map. When the river resurfaces, if turns to the south, running behind the church building and then to the east along the back of gardens belonging to houses on Coggles Causeway. A lengthy culvert carries it under the Abbey Lawn complex and Victoria Place. This culvert is more recent, as it was built in the 1960s when the recreation ground became the Abbey Lawn sports complex. Before the culvert was built, the railway line to Sleaford crossed the river near to where the culvert starts. It passes under Queen's Bridge, and then runs parallel to Eastgate. Half way along Eastgate, the channel becomes much wider, where it formed the terminal basin for the Bourne Eau when it was navigable. The Roman Car Dyke, now reused as a drainage channel, originally ran though the town, passing along the west side of Queen's Bridge, but a modern channel joins the southern section to the basin, on the north bank of which is the Anchor Inn, a small grade II listed public house dating from the 18th century. The A151 Cherry Holt Road crosses the waterway at May's Sluice, and then it enters South Fen, where it is joined by another channel linking to the Car Dyke on its north bank. Below the junction its flow is supplemented by the treated outfall from Bourne sewage treatment works. The river is embanked on both sides, and there are low level catchwater drains running parallel to the banks. A bridge carried the railway to Spalding over the river.

The present course enters the River Glen at Tongue End, a name which derives from the low tongue of land within the enclosing banks of the rivers.

Apart from the spring, most of the water of the river is collected by the Car Dyke, which, near Bourne, is arranged to act as a catchwater drain, gathering the surface water of the upland and feeding it via the Bourne Eau and River Glen to the sea, without its entering The Fens.

== History ==
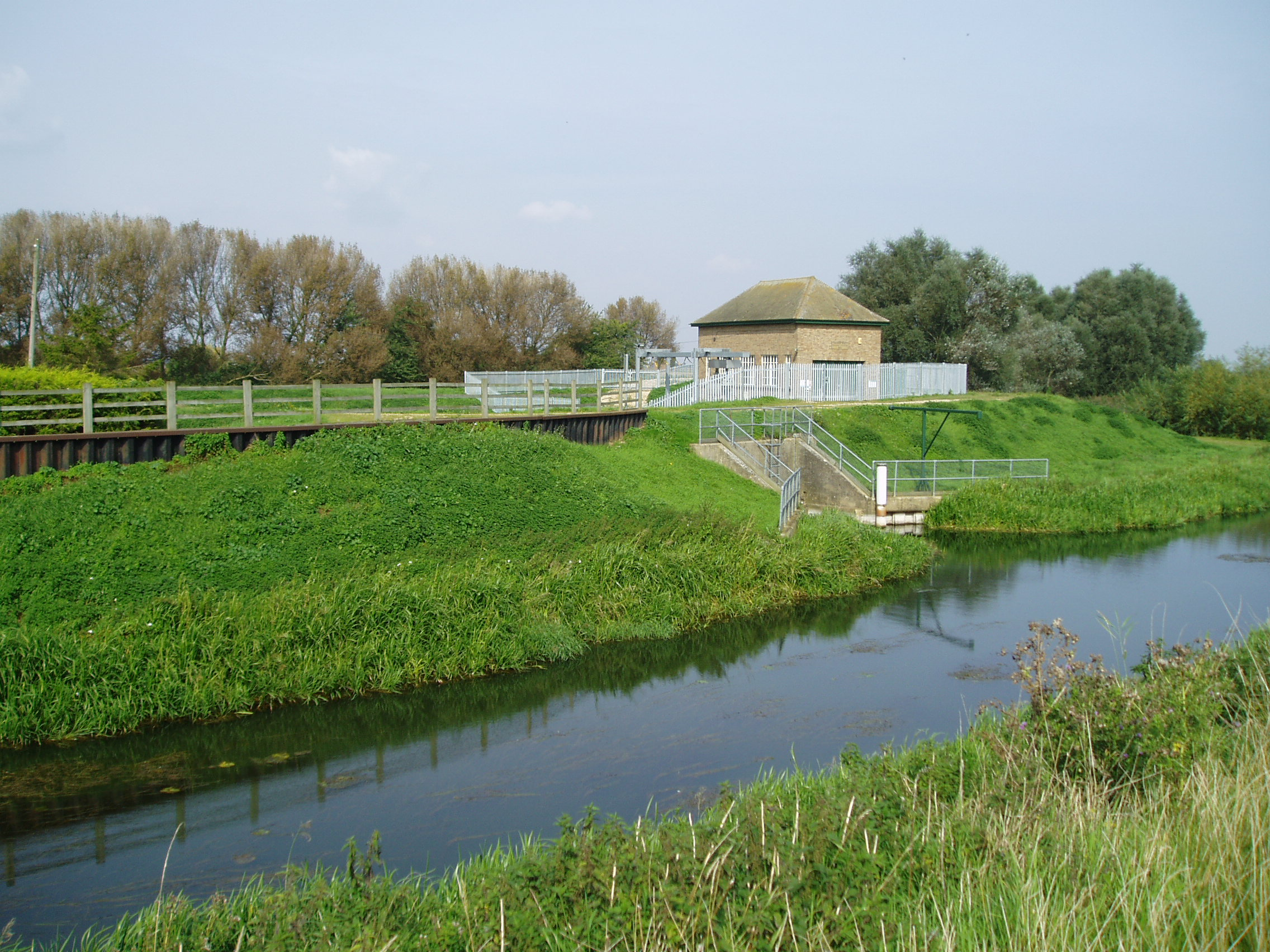
The pumping station at Tongue End, which replaced the former sluice between Bourne Eau and the River Glen.

The course of the river through South Fen is clearly manmade, as the river is above the level of the surrounding land, but there is no known documentary evidence as to when this was first carried out. In the 13th century it was called Bourne Ald Ea or Brunne Ea, and the Commission of Sewers issued an order that it should be raised and scoured by the people of Bourne. Work on the north bank was to extend as far as Goderam's Cote, and on the south bank to Merehirne. Another order was made in 1376, that the Brunne Ald Ea was to be repaired, raised and cleansed, but this time the responsibility for the work was shared between the town and the Abbot of Brunne. Later an order required that the banks be made 12 feet (3.7 m) thick and raised by an extra 2 feet (0.6 m).

Documentary evidence for the use of the Bourne Eau is quite scant, but in the 16th century Bourne was a market town, and it is probable that the river enabled the corn trade to flourish. In 1765, there was serious flooding in the area, following the failure of the banks of both the Bourne Eau and the River Glen. As a result, the north bank of the river became the responsibility of the Black Sluice Commissioners, a body which was created by an Act of Parliament, to construct the Black Sluice where the South Forty-Foot Drain entered The Haven at Boston, and to supervise the drainage of the Fens feeding that system. The north bank was a serious problem, as it was built on a peat subsoil, and defied attempts to raise it, with the result that the Bourne Fens often flooded.

Bourn, Lincolnshire Navigation Act 1781
- Act of Parliament
- Parliament of Great Britain
- Long title: An Act for improving the Navigation of the River called Bourn Eau, from the Town of Bourn to its Junction with the River Glen, at a Place called Tongue End, in the County of Lincoln.
- Citation: 21 Geo. 3. c. 22
- Territorial extent: Great Britain

Dates
- Royal assent: 29 March 1781
- Commencement: 31 October 1780 (Note: Start of session)
Other legislation
Relates to	Kesteven and Holland Inclosures and Drainage Act 1801

Status: Current legislation

Text of statute as originally enacted

Improvements to the 3.5 miles (5.6 km) of river from the River Glen junction to the town of Bourne were authorised by an act of Parliament, the Bourn, Lincolnshire Navigation Act 1781 (21 Geo. 3. c. 22), obtained on 29 March 1781, which suggested that the river had previously been navigable, but had become choked with mud. The act created a body of 12 trustees, who were empowered to maintain a channel which was 30 feet (9.1 m) wide by 5 feet (1.5 m) deep. They could charge tolls on all boats using the navigation, on which the main merchandise was coal and wool, which were shipped to Boston for onward transmission to the north east. Return trips brought coal and groceries to the town, and a coal wharf was erected on Eastgate during the early years of the 19th century. There was also some trade with Spalding, including a regular service to take people and goods to Spalding market every Tuesday, but Thomas Hawkes noted in 1792 that the service was a little intermittent, as there was often too little or too much water in the river. Investigation showed that the river levels rose by 9 or 10 inches (230 or 250 mm) for every quarter of an inch (6 mm) of rainfall in the River Glen catchment. The navigation included two locks, one near the junction with the Glen, and the other near Bourne.

In order to ease the problems caused by the north bank, the Black Sluice Commissioners negotiated with the Trustees to allow them to build a set of self-acting flood gates at Tongue End, where the river joined the Glen, and an overfall weir, which allowed surplus water to flow over the bank and into the Weir Dyke in Bourne Fen. The self-acting doors prevented high water levels in the Glen from flooding back up the Bourne Eau, and it improved navigation for a time, but competition from the railway saw traffic decline. A railway from Boston to Spalding opened in 1848, with a branch from Spalding to Bourne completed in 1866. A link from Bourne to Sleaford followed in 1872. By 1857, boats using the navigation only do so occasionally, and the self-acting doors were replaced by a sluice in the 1860s, which effectively brought navigation to an end. The Bourne Eau Act was repealed in 1962, removing the right of navigation, and the sluice was replaced by a pumping station in 1966, which removed the need for the overfall weir.

=== Milling ===
The river has been used to power mills since at least 1086, when the Domesday Book recorded three mills in the village. There were three mills in the late 1800s, all of which were marked as corn mills on the 1888 map. Cliffe's or West Street Mill was on the stream that ran around the northern edge of the castle site, was at times used for grinding bark for use in the tanning industry. It was demolished in 1910. Baldock's Mill was located where the streams left the castle site, on the western side of South Street, while Notley's Mill was a flour mill, and was located on the west side of Victoria Place, close to Eastgate. It survived until 1973.

Baldock's Mill still exists, and has been repurposed as a heritage centre. The present building was constructed in 1800, and the mill was operated for two three-hour periods each day. This was subsequently increased, by digging a new channel, and was later supplemented by a gas engine. The mill had two water wheels, one make of timber which was 15 feet (4.6 m) in diameter by 3 feet (0.91 m) wide, and a second metal wheel which was 5 feet (1.5 m) by 12 inches (30 cm). The mill produced animal feed from corn and maize, and was used commercially in 1920, when the miller was Mr Baldock. The building was grade II listed in 1973, and initial restoration work was carried out by pupils from Bourne Secondary School, the Robert Manning Technology College (now known as Bourne Academy). It is owned by Bourne United Charities, but has been leased to the Civic Society since 1983, who have gradually turned it into a heritage centre, celebrating the town and the lives of some of its residents. In 2002, the Civic Society decided to restore the wheels. The large wheel could not be rebuilt to its full size, due to modifications made to the building to make it suitable for public use, but the small wheel is operational, and drives a generator, which powers the heating system for the centre.

=== Water abstraction ===
A major component of the flow in the Bourne Eau is from the spring at St Peters Pool. Historically this produced some 4.5 million imperial gallons (20 Ml) per day, and was of sufficient purity that it was bottled and sold as mineral water in the late Victorian period. The flow has since reduced, resulting in the river being smaller than it was. Anglian Water have two boreholes near the junction of Abbey Road and Manning Road, which are authorised to abstract up to 25 Mld (megalitres per day), although they normally abstract around 16 Mld. The water is oxygenated, chlorinated to disinfect it, and checked for clarity. It is then pumped into the public supply network, most of it passing along an 18-inch (46 cm) pipeline to Spalding Tower. Water for Spalding has been obtained from the aquifer below Bourne since 1894, when the first borehole was drilled to a depth of 134 feet (41 m). Boreholes proliferated, and there were about 130 around the town by 1969. Most of these have since been sealed up, and only Anglian Water operates boreholes within the town.

In the late 1960s, engineers began to appreciate that water was being removed from the aquifer at rates which were not sustainable, and several important studies took place to assess the situation. These coincided with a period of low rainfall, which reduced the speed at which the aquifer would recharge. Housing development at Peterborough was expected to require an extra 100 Mld to maintain the public water supply, and it was thought that this could be obtained from the aquifer. However, since the passing of the Water Resources Act 1963, all abstraction had to be licensed, and investigation showed that the aquifer was already being over-abstracted. It was thought that it could supply around 68 Mld, but licences at the time allowed 139 Mld to be abstracted, although only 77 Mld actually were. This imbalance meant that an alternative water supply for Peterborough had to be found, and resulted in the construction of Rutland Water.

These conditions led to a steady lowering of water levels within the aquifer, which were particularly bad in the mid-1970s, when river flows were significantly reduced. Abstraction from the aquifer was reduced, and river flows increased, but the lack of water in the River Glen led to most of the fish dying, and fish populations had still not recovered ten years later. Bourne Eau dried up in 1972, and the curate of the Abbey Church inspired a group of 30 young people to remove all of the rubbish from the muddy river bed. At that time, the existence of a number of wild artesian boreholes was recorded, but attempts to repair one of them proved difficult, and no further action was taken. A wild borehole is one where the discharge of water is no longer under control, and it continually runs to waste. There had been four years of below average rainfall in the late 1980s, resulting in the Bourne Eau drying up again, and the National Rivers Authority undertook a project to seal or repair 30 wild boreholes located to the east of Bourne, between August 1991 and October 1992. Most had been drilled in the later 19th century to supply the isolated farms that were established when the fens were drained. Initially they had been drilled by hand, but later, steam engines were used, with most of them being constructed by J E Noble of Thurlby. The repairs were estimated to retain 7.5 Mld within the aquifer during dry periods, and as much as 18 Mld when conditions were more normal. One obvious benefit of the work was that water again began to flow into St Peters Pool, and Bourne Eau flowed for the first time in several years, although this may have been aided by a very wet winter in 1992.

=== Land drainage ===
Bourn Inclosure Act 1766
- Act of Parliament
- Parliament of Great Britain
- Long title: An Act for allotting, dividing, enclosing, and draining, several Open and Common Fields, Meadows, Waste and Fen Grounds, within the Manor and Parish of Bourn, in the County of Lincoln.
- Citation: 6 Geo. 3. c. 52 Pr.
- Territorial extent: Great Britain

Dates
- Royal assent: 30 April 1766
- Commencement: 17 December 1765

Status: Current legislation

Once Bourne Eau leaves the town of Bourne, it passes through fenland. Until 1772, land on both sides of the river was treated as one unit, but an act of Parliament obtained in 1772 split the North Fen, to the north of the river, and the South Fen, to the south of the river, into two separate drainage districts. Prior to that, rents had been payable to the Black Sluice Commissioners to fund the work they did on the drainage network. An inclosure act, the Bourn Inclosure Act 1766 (6 Geo. 3. c. 52 Pr.) was obtained in 1776, covering the North Fen and fenland in the hamlets of Dyke and Cawthorpe. After dealing will the allocation of land for use as cow parture, it included a clause that ensured that the Well Head would be protected, and its water would continue to feed into Bourne Eau. Maintenance of the south bank of the river was proving difficult, because there was a lack of soil within 120 feet (37 m) of the bank, and this distance had previously been specified as the limits for obtaining material for repairs. The inclosure act extended this to 180 feet (55 m).

Bourne Drainage Act 1841
- Act of Parliament
- Parliament of the United Kingdom
- Long title: An Act for the better Drainage of Lands in Bourn North Fen and Dyke Fen in the Manor and Parish of Bourn in the County of Lincoln.
- Citation: 4 & 5 Vict. c. cxiii
- Territorial extent: United Kingdom

Dates
- Royal assent: 22 June 1841
- Commencement: 22 June 1841 (Note: The Acts of Parliament (Commencement) Act 1793.)
Other legislation
Amended by	Lincolnshire Fens Drainage Act 1843

Status: Amended

Text of statute as originally enacted

Lincolnshire Fens Drainage Act 1843
- Act of Parliament
- Parliament of the United Kingdom
- Long title: An Act for altering, amending and enlarging the Powers and Provisions of an Act passed in Her present Majesty's reign, for the better Drainage of Lands in Bourn North Eau and Dyke Fen, in the Manor and Parish of Bourn, in the County of Lincoln, and for other Purposes concerning the Drainage of the same Lands.
- Citation: 6 & 7 Vict. c. xxxvii
- Territorial extent: United Kingdom

Dates
- Royal assent: 31 May 1843
- Commencement: 31 May 1843
Other legislation
Amends	Bourne Drainage Act 1841

Status: Current legislation

The North Fen drained by gravity into the South Forty-Foot Drain, but the owners wanted to improve the drainage. They intended to use steam engines to pump the water out of the fen and into the South Forty-Foot Drain, but the Black Sluice Commissioners objected to the proposal, on the basis that it would prevent other fens from draining properly. The disagreement took a long time to resolve, but the Proprietors eventually obtained the Bourne Drainage Act 1841 (4 & 5 Vict. c. cxiii), which transferred the responsibility for the North Fen from the Black Sluice Commissioners to trustees representing the owners of land within the North Fen. Significantly, the act allowed the trustees to build steam pumping engines. The introduction to the act stated that a number of wind-powered engines had been built following the 1776 enclosure act, but all had been removed after their condition deteriorated. In order to prevent the South Forty-Foot Drain from being overwhelmed by the volume of water pumped into it, a gauge was erected, and pumping had to stop when water levels exceeded an agreed height. A second act, the Lincolnshire Fens Drainage Act 1843 (6 & 7 Vict. c. xxxvii), transferred the maintenance of the drainage infrastructure within the North Fen from the Black Sluice Commissioners to the Bourne Fen Trust.

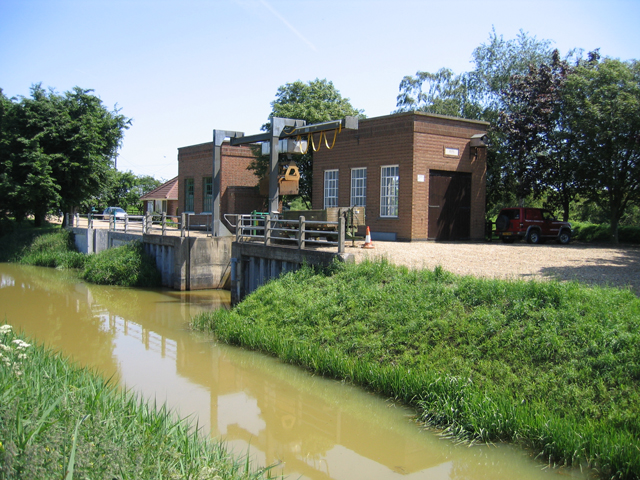
The pumping station for the South Fen. The buildings carry the dates 1946 (left) and 1976 (right).

The pumping engine was built at Guthram Gowt. In 1872, some 2,000 acres (810 ha) of the North Fen were flooded, when the level in the River Glen rose to 2 feet (0.6 m) above any previously known level, and the north bank of Bourne Eau between the lower lock and Tongue End was breached. The Bourne Fen Trust attempted to sue the Black Sluice Commissioners, but the jury found that they had maintained the bank adequately, and therefore dismissed the claim. It was flooded again in 1877 when someone cut through the bank of the River Glen, but despite a reward of £100 being offered, the offender was not discovered. The Guthram Gowt engine was obtained from the Butterley Company and erected in 1845. It was a 30 hp (22 kW) beam engine, driving a scoop wheel which was 15 feet (4.6 m) in diameter. The scoop wheel was replaced by a 20-inch (51 cm) pump manufactured by Easton and Anderson in 1895, and the engine was replaced by a Tangye gas engine in 1918. It drove the Easton and Anderson pump by a belt drive. A Ruston diesel engine driving a 36-inch (91 cm) Gwynnes pump was installed to assist the gas engine in 1933, and both engines were replaced by a 24-inch (61 cm) electric pump in 1968.

Drainage of the South Fen was complicated by the fact that it was hemmed in by Bourne Eau and the River Glen, both of which were embanked. The solution adopted by Thomas Lovell, working on behalf of the Adventurers of Deeping Fen in the early 17th century, was to construct a culvert beneath the River Glen. It was to be maintained by John Heathcote, who owned the land. The culvert, subsequently known as Gilbert Heathcote's tunnel, allowed water to drain into the Slacker Dyke, now called the Counter Drain, from where it flowed to Pode Hole. The South Fen was enclosed in 1772, and ceased to pay taxes to the Adventurers by an act of Parliament obtained in 1738. A subsequent act of Parliament ensured that if the Deeping Fen Trust ever lowered the bed of the Glen, they would first have to lower the culvert. A number of scoop wheels, powered by horses, were used to assist in the drainage of the fen. Under the powers of the Land Drainage Act 1861 (24 & 25 Vict. c. 133), the South Fen Drainage District was created in 1871. They hired a portable engine to drive a scoop wheel, and bought their own engine in 1872. The scoop wheel was supplemented by a centrifugal pump in 1887.

In 1893, the engine was replaced by a new 10 hp (7.5 kW) portable engine, and a new scoop wheel was manufactured in 1904. The drainage district became the Bourne South and Thurlby Fen Drainage Board in 1910, increasing its area by 856 acres (346 ha). In order to manage this larger area, a gas suction engine driving a scoop wheel was built nearer to the tunnel, to replace the previous engine. This worked until 1942, when it broke down. The fen became part of the Deeping Fen Drainage District in 1943, and until a new pumping station was built in 1949, portable pumps were used to maintain the water levels. The new station had two vertical spindle pumps driven by electric motors, and the station was altered in 1973, to lower the pumps. In 1973, the Baston, Langtoft and the Deepings Internal Drainage Board (IDB) as it was by then known, was abolished, together with three other nearby IDBs, and replaced by the Welland and Deepings IDB.

== Etymology ==
Wheeler (1896) gives the name Bourne Old Ea to what is now the Bourne Eau and Bourne Ea or Brunne Ea to that part of the Glen downstream of Kate's Bridge. He then quotes Dugdale, and an act of Queen Elizabeth I:

Brunne, River of, Brunne Hee,Burne Alde Ee. In Dugdale the Brunne Ee is described in the margin as 'now the Glene'...'Which had its course through the midst of the town of Pincbec.' The 'Ware' Dyke is described as extending along 'the river of Burne Ee to Godramscote' in a commission of Sewers held at Hempringingham in Queen Elisabeth's time.

The French-seeming spelling Eau is not unique in English river names. It appears to have arisen in the nineteenth century from a misunderstanding by Ordnance Surveyors of local pronunciations. As late as the 1970s older residents in Lincolnshire pronounced the Eau suffix as "oo-ah". There is a small cluster of watercourses on the Northumberland coastal plain opposite Holy Island also suffixed Eau and which in the early 1970s older inhabitants still pronounced "oo-er". The older spelling was Ea, from Old English ǣ (ultimately from the Proto-Indo-European *hakʷā- "(moving) water"), see also Aach (toponymy) for more detail. Bourne "stream" is from Old English burne, burna ("spring, fountain").

== See also ==
- Bourne-Morton Canal

== Bibliography ==
- Atkinson, Tim; Farrant, Andrew (25 June 2015). "Groundwater in Jurassic carbonates" (PDF). University of Birmingham. Archived (PDF) from the original on 27 February 2021.
- Boyes, John; Russell, Ronald (1977). The Canals of Eastern England. David and Charles. ISBN 978-0-7153-7415-3.
- Chapman, Nigel (16 February 2017). "The landmark through which every drop of fresh water in Spalding area passes". Spalding and South Holland Voice. Archived from the original on 1 March 2021.
- Hinde, K S G (2006). Fenland Pumping Engines. Landmark Publishing. ISBN 978-1-84306-188-5.
- Machin, Steve (2008). "Bourne Eau History". East Anglian Waterways Association. Archived from the original on 3 February 2021.
- Needle, Rex (2003). "Restoration of the water wheel". Bourne Civic Society. Archived from the original on 19 February 2020.
- Needle, Rex (2008). "The villages around Bourne, Lincolnshire - Tongue End". Homepages.which.net. Archived from the original on 11 October 2008.
- Needle, Rex (7 January 2012). "The Bourne Diary". www.bourne-lincs.org.uk. Archived from the original on 4 September 2018.
- Needle, Rex (20 January 2015). "The changing fortunes of the Bourne Eau". Bourne Local. Archived from the original on 24 March 2017.
- Perkins, M A; et al. (April 1993). "South Lincolnshire Limestone Aquifer: Sealing of Wild Boreholes" (PDF). National Rivers Authority.
- Priestley, Joseph (1831). Historical Account of the Navigable Rivers, Canals, and Railways, of Great Britain. Archived from the original on 9 March 2016.
- Scott, P. C. (1986). "Environmental aspects of a conjunctive use scheme in the Oundle Division of Anglian Water" (PDF). Conjunctive Water Use (Proceedings of the Budapest Symposium, July 1986). IAHS.
- Wheeler, M.Inst.C.E, William Henry (1896). A History of the Fens of South Lincolnshire, being a description of the rivers Witham and Welland and their estuary, and an account of the Reclamation, Drainage, and Enclosure of the fens adjacent thereto. (2nd ed.). J.M. Newcombe (Boston), Simpkin, Marshall & Co. (London). doi:10.1680/ahotfosl2e.50358. ISBN 978-0-7277-5035-8. OL 24176538M.
