= The Fens =

Area of low lying land in eastern England

Coordinates: 52.48838°N 0.23118°W

- Natural region
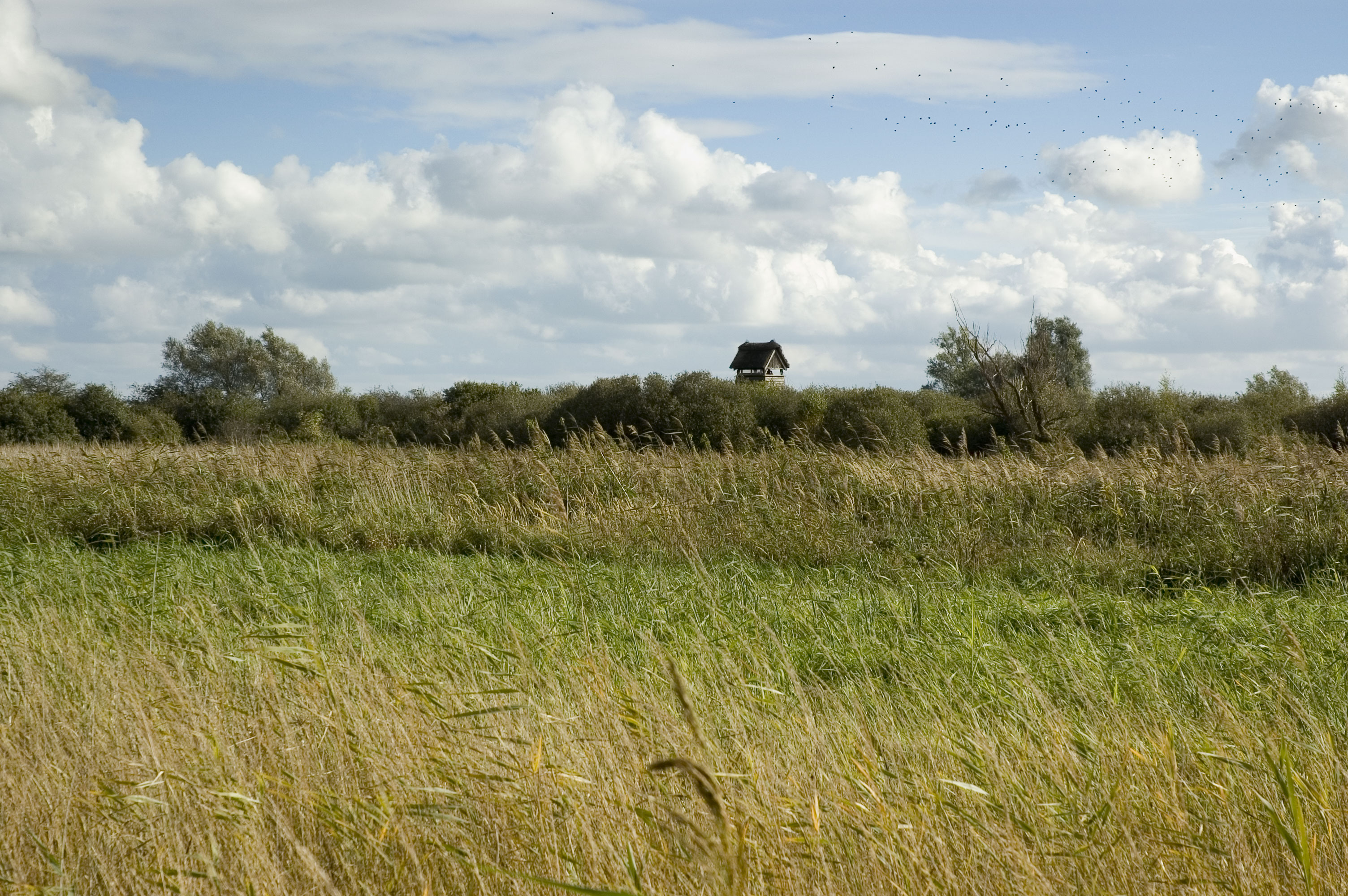
- Wicken Fen

- Map of the Fens within eastern England along with the major settlements, rivers and drains within it.
- Country: United Kingdom
- Constituent country: England
- Region: East of England; East Midlands
- Counties: Lincolnshire, Cambridgeshire, Norfolk; Suffolk

Area
  - Total: 1,500 sq mi (3,900 km^{2})
- Time zone: UTC±0 (Greenwich Mean Time)
  - Summer (DST): UTC+1 (British Summer Time)
- Website: visitcambridgeshirefens.org

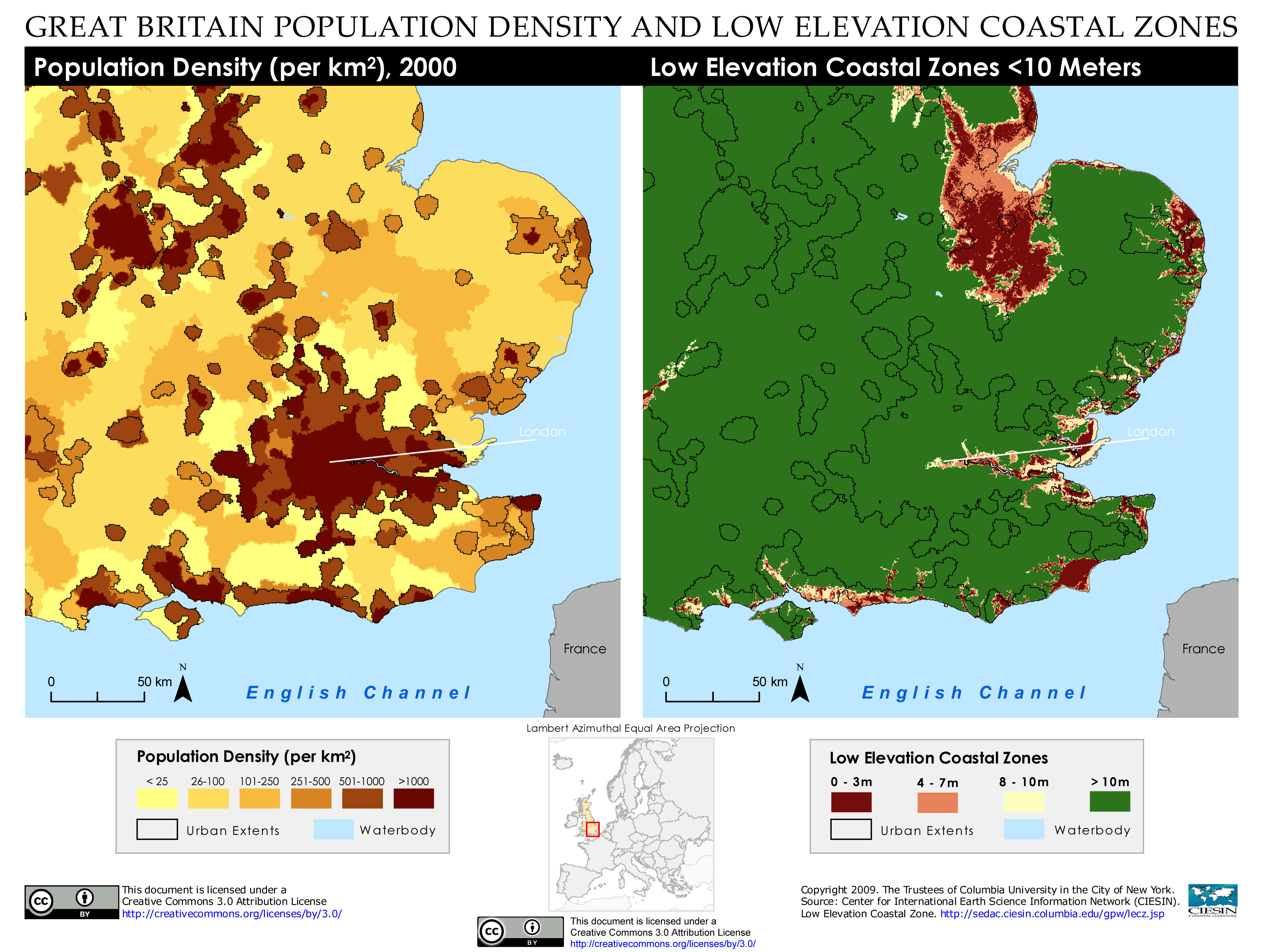
England population density and low elevation coastal zones. The Fens are particularly vulnerable to sea level rise.

The Fens or Fenlands in eastern England are a naturally marshy region supporting a rich ecology and numerous species. Most of the fens were drained centuries ago, resulting in a flat, dry, low-lying agricultural region supported by a system of drainage channels, man-made rivers (dykes and drains), and automated pumping stations. There have been unintended consequences to this reclamation, as the land level has continued to sink and the dykes have been built higher to protect it from flooding.

Fen is the local term for an individual area of marshland or former marshland. It also designates the type of marsh typical of the area, which has neutral or alkaline water and relatively large quantities of dissolved minerals, but few other plant nutrients.

The Fens are a National Character Area, based on their landscape, biodiversity, geodiversity and economic activity.

The Fens lie inland of the Wash, and are an area of nearly 1,500 sq mi (3,900 km^{2}) in the south east of Lincolnshire, most of Cambridgeshire (which also includes parts of the old historic counties of Huntingdonshire and Northamptonshire), and western-most parts of Norfolk and Suffolk.

Most of the Fens lie within a few metres of sea level. As with similar areas in the Netherlands, much of the Fenland originally consisted of fresh- or salt-water wetlands. These have been artificially drained and continue to be protected from floods by drainage banks and pumps. With the support of this drainage system, the Fenland has become a major arable agricultural region for grains and vegetables. The Fens are particularly fertile, containing around half of the grade 1 agricultural land in England.

The Fens have been referred to as the "Holy Land of the English" because of the former monasteries, now churches and cathedrals, of Crowland, Ely, Peterborough, Ramsey and Thorney. Other significant settlements in the Fens include Boston, Downham Market, King’s Lynn, Mildenhall, March, Spalding, and Wisbech.

== Background: historical flooding and drainage ==
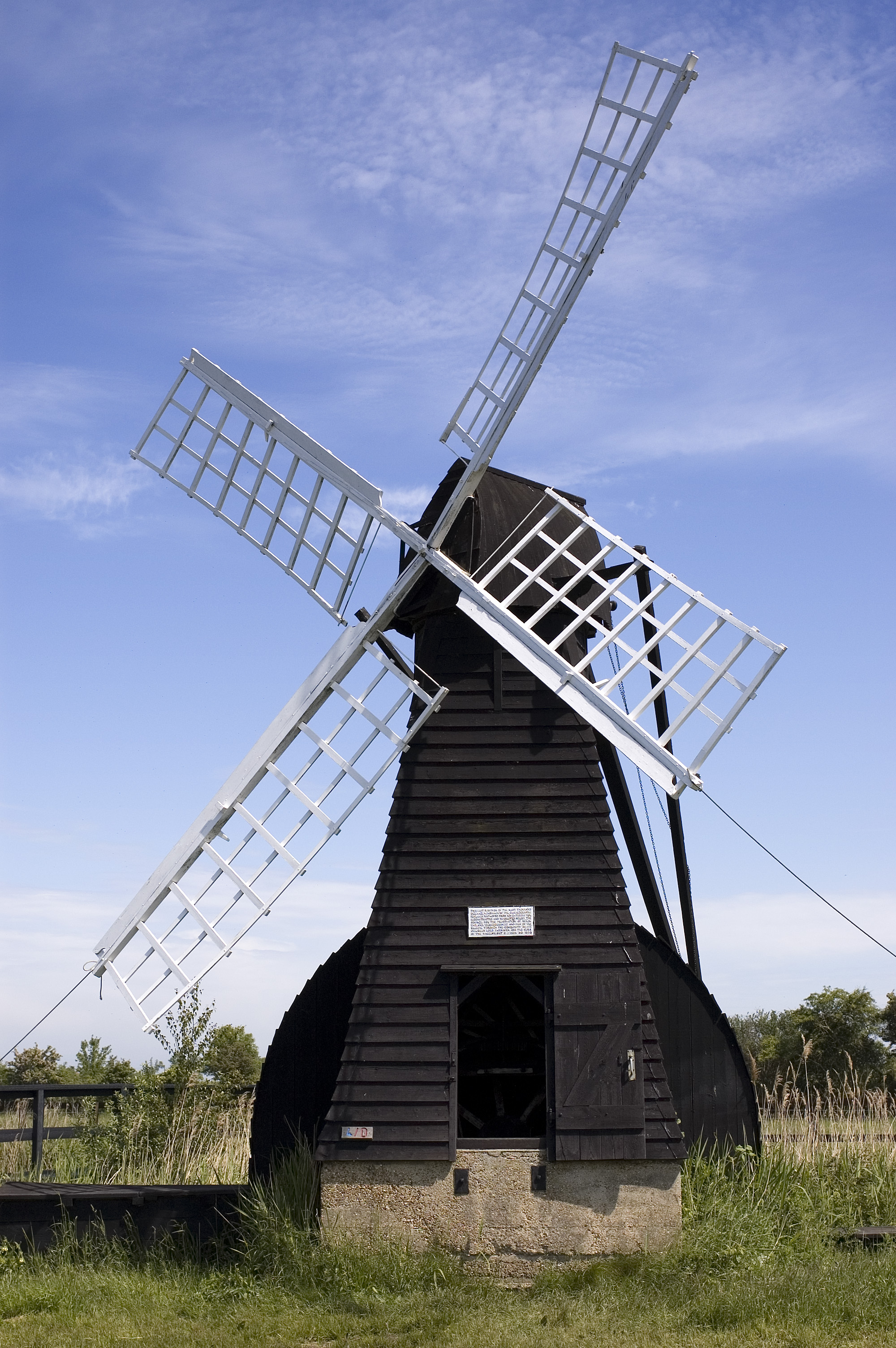
A windpump at Wicken Fen

The Fens are very low-lying compared with the chalk and limestone uplands that surround them – in most places no more than 10 metres (33 ft) above sea level. As a result of drainage and the subsequent shrinkage of the peat fens, many parts of the Fens now lie below mean sea level. Although one writer in the 17th century described the Fenland as entirely above sea level (in contrast to the Netherlands), the area now includes the lowest land in the United Kingdom. Holme Fen in Cambridgeshire is around 2.75 metres (9 ft 0 in) below sea level. Within the Fens are a few hills which have historically been called "islands", as they remained dry when the low-lying fens around them were flooded. The largest of the fen-islands was the 23-square-mile (60 km^{2}) Kimmeridge Clay island, on which the cathedral city of Ely was built: its highest point is 39 metres (128 ft) above mean sea level.

Without artificial drainage and flood protection, the Fens would be liable to periodic flooding, particularly in winter, due to the heavy load of water flowing down from the uplands and overflowing the rivers. Some areas of the Fens were once permanently flooded, creating lakes or meres, while others were flooded only during periods of high water. In the pre-modern period, arable farming was limited to the higher areas of the surrounding uplands, the fen islands, and the so-called "Townlands", an arch of silt ground around the Wash, where the towns had their arable fields. Though these lands were lower than the peat fens before the peat shrinkage began, the more stable silt soils were reclaimed by medieval farmers and embanked against any floods coming down from the peat areas or from the sea. The rest of the Fenland was dedicated to pastoral farming, fishing, fowling, and the harvesting of reeds or sedge for thatch. In this way, the medieval and early modern Fens stood in contrast to the rest of England, which was primarily an arable agricultural region.

Since the advent of modern drainage in the 19th and 20th centuries, the Fens have been radically transformed. Today, arable farming has almost entirely replaced pastoral. The economy of the Fens is heavily invested in the production of crops such as grains, vegetables, and some cash crops such as rapeseed (canola).

== Areas of the Fens ==
Drainage in the Fenland consists of both river drainage and internal drainage of the land between the rivers. The internal drainage was organised by levels or districts, each of which includes the fen parts of one or several parishes. The details of the organisation vary with the history of their development, but the areas generally include:

=== Great Level ===
The Great Level of the Fens is the largest region of fen in eastern England: including the lower drainage basins of the River Nene and the Great Ouse, it covers about 500 sq mi (1,300 km^{2}). It is also known as the Bedford Level, after Francis Russell, 4th Earl of Bedford, who headed the so-called adventurers (investors) in the 17th-century drainage in this area; his son became the first governor of the Bedford Level Corporation. In the 17th century, the Great Level was divided into the North, Middle and South Levels for the purposes of administration and maintenance. In the 20th century, these levels were given new boundaries; they included some fens that were never part of the jurisdiction of the Bedford Level Corporation.

- The South Level lies to the southeast of the Ouse Washes and surrounds Ely, as it did in the 17th century.
- The Middle Level lies between the Ouse Washes and the Nene, but historically was defined as between the Ouse Washes and Morton's Leam, a 15th-century canal that runs north of the town of Whittlesey.
- The North Level now includes all of the fens in Cambridgeshire and Lincolnshire between the Nene and the River Welland. It originally included only a small part of these lands, including the ancient parishes of Thorney and Crowland, but excluding most of Wisbech Hundred and Lincolnshire, which were under their own local jurisdictions.
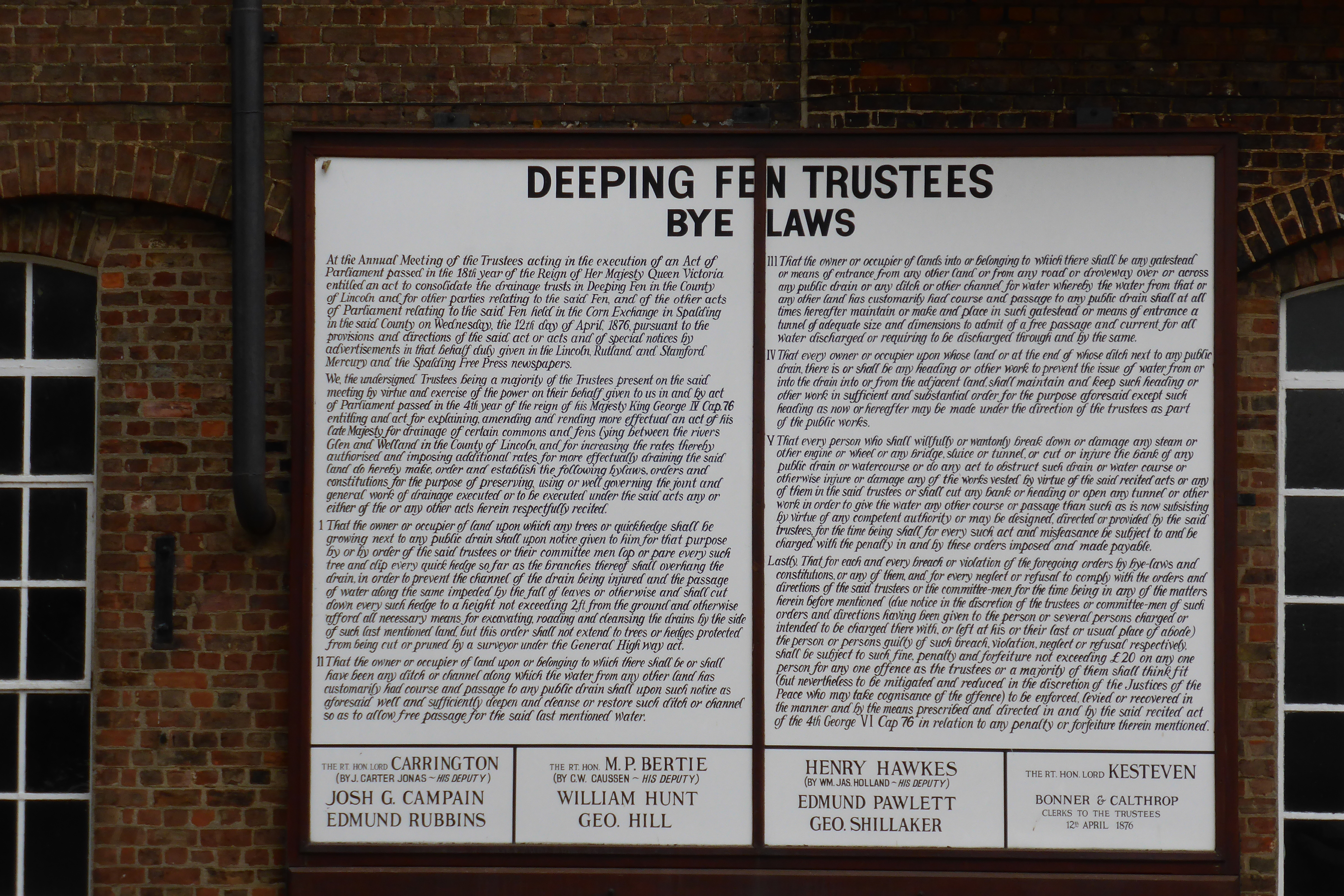
  The former by-laws of Deeping Fen at Pode Hole near Spalding

=== Bourne and Deeping Fens ===
Bourne Fen and Deeping Fen lie in the southern most parts of Lincolnshire, between the Rivers Welland and the Bourne Eau with the River Glen running between the two Fens and the area covers both the town of Bourne as well as The Deepings including the villages of Langtoft and Baston.

=== Black Sluice Level ===
The Black Sluice Level, also known as the Black Sluice District, was first drained in 1639 and extends from the Glen and Bourne Eau to Swineshead and then across to Kirton. Its waters is carried mostly though the South Forty-Foot Drain through to the Haven at Boston though the Black Sluice. Also this area includes the market town of Spalding and the ancient village of Sempringham. The above were all redrained at one time or another after the Civil War (1642–1649).

=== Holland, Wildmore, West and East Fens ===
These areas cover the northern most part of the Fens from Boston right up as far north west as Washingborough near Lincoln along the course of the River Witham and to the north east it extends up as far as the edge of the Lincolnshire Wolds to the seaside town of Skegness.

- The Witham Commission Fens:
  - First District: from Washingborough to Billinghay Dales
  - Second District: Blacksluice – Holland Fen
  - Third District: north of the River Witham above Bardney
  - Fourth District: East, West and Wildmore Fens and the Townland from Boston to Wainfleet
  - Fifth District: Kyme Eau to Billinghay Skirth
  - Sixth District: Blacksluice – Helpringham Eau to Kyme Eau

These were drained in the 18th and 19th centuries.

== Formation and geography ==
At the end of the most recent glacial period, known in Britain as the Devensian, ten thousand years ago, Britain and continental Europe were joined by the ridge between Friesland and Norfolk. The topography of the bed of the North Sea indicates that the rivers of the southern part of eastern England flowed into the Rhine, thence through the English Channel. From the Fens northward along the modern coast, the drainage flowed into the northern North Sea basin. As the ice melted, the rising sea level drowned the lower lands, leading ultimately to the present coastline.

These rising sea levels flooded the previously inland woodland of the Fenland basin; over the next few thousand years both saltwater and freshwater wetlands developed as a result. Silt and clay soils were deposited by marine floods in the saltwater areas and along the beds of tidal rivers, while organic soils, or peats, developed in the freshwater marshes. Fenland water levels peaked in the Iron Age; earlier Bronze and Neolithic settlements were covered by peat deposits, and have only recently been found after periods of extensive droughts revealed them. During the Roman period, water levels fell once again. Settlements developed on the new silt soils deposited near the coast. Though water levels rose once again in the early medieval period, by this time artificial banks protected the coastal settlements and the interior from further deposits of marine silts. Peats continued to develop in the freshwater wetlands of the interior fens.

The wetlands of the fens have historically included:

- Washes: these are places such as tidal mud flats and braided rivers, which are sometimes exposed and at other times covered with water.
- Salt marsh: this is the higher part of a tidal wash, on which salt-adapted plants grew.
- Fen: this is a broad expanse of nutrient-rich shallow water in which dead plants do not fully decay, resulting in a flora of emergent plants growing in saturated peat.
- Moor: this developed where the peat grew above the reach of the land water which carried the nutrients to the fen. Its development was enabled where the fen was watered directly by rainfall. The slightly acidic rain neutralized the hydroxide ions of the peat, making it more suitable for acid-loving plants, notably Sphagnum species. This is the same as bog, but the word moor was applied to this acid peatland occurring on hills. These moors disappeared in the 19th century. Researchers did not think that the Fenland had this kind of peat, until the discovery of archaeological and documentary evidence showing that it did until the early 19th century.
- Waters: these have included:
  - tidal creeks, which reached from the sea into the marsh, the Townlands and in some places, the fen. They were named only if big enough to be regarded as havens
  - meres, or shallow lakes, which were more or less static but aerated by wind action
  - many rivers, both natural and (from Roman times on) artificial

Major areas for settlement were:

- Townlands, a broad bank of silt (the remains of the huge creek levees that developed naturally during the Bronze and Iron Ages), on which the settlers built homes and grew vegetables for households
- fen islands: areas of higher land, which were never covered by the growing peat
- fen edges: uplands surrounding the fens

In general, of the three principal soil types found in the Fenland today, the mineral-based silt resulted from the energetic marine environment of the creeks, the clay was deposited in tidal mud-flats and salt-marsh, while the peat grew in the fen and bog. The peat produces black soils, which are directly comparable to the American muck soils. A roddon, the dried raised bed of a watercourse, is more suitable for building than the less stable peat.

Since the 19th century, all of the acid peat in the Fens has disappeared. Drying and wastage of peats has greatly reduced the depth of the alkaline peat soils and reduced the overall elevation of large areas of the peat fens. It is also recorded that peat was dug out of the East and West Lincolnshire fens in the 14th century and used to fire the salterns of Wrangle and Friskney. In later centuries it was used locally for winter fuel and its digging controlled by the Duchy of Lancaster.

Written records of earthquakes in the Fen area appear as early as 1048. According to Historia Ingulfi, p. 64, (1684) this took place in Lincolnshire. In 1117 one affected Holland, Lincs, "endangering and injuring Crowland Abbey". In 1185 Lincoln was damaged. In 1448 a shock was recorded in south Lincolnshire (Ingulfi, p. 526). In 1750 John Moore records a severe shock attended by a rumbling noise in Bourn after midday. This was felt in Lincolnshire, Leicestershire and Northamptonshire. Houses tottered, slates, tiles and some chimneys fell. As it was a Sunday, some people ran out of the churches "in great consternation". In 1792 another shock was also felt in Bourne and neighbouring towns.

== History ==
=== Pre-Roman settlement ===
There is evidence of human settlement near the Fens from the Mesolithic on. The evidence suggests that Mesolithic settlement in Cambridgeshire was particularly along the fen edges and on the low islands within the fens, to take advantage of the hunting and fishing opportunities of the wetlands. Internationally important sites include Flag Fen and Must Farm quarry Bronze Age settlement and Stonea Camp.

=== Roman farming and engineering ===
The Romans constructed the Fen Causeway, a road across the Fens to link what later became East Anglia with what later became central England; it runs between Denver and Peterborough. They also linked Cambridge and Ely. Generally, their road system avoided the Fens, except for minor roads designed for exporting the products of the region, especially salt, beef and leather. Sheep were probably raised on the higher ground of the Townlands and fen islands, then as in the early 19th century. There may have been some drainage efforts during the Roman period, including the Car Dyke along the western edge of the Fenland between Peterborough and Lincolnshire, but most canals were constructed for transportation.

How far seaward the Roman settlement extended is unclear owing to the deposits laid down above them during later floods.

=== Early post-Roman settlements ===
The early post-Roman settlements were made on the Townlands. It is clear that there was some prosperity there, particularly where rivers permitted access to the upland beyond the fen. Such places were Wisbech, Spalding, Swineshead and Boston. All the Townlands parishes were laid out as elongated strips, to provide access to the products of fen, marsh and sea. On the fen edge, parishes are similarly elongated to provide access to both upland and fen. The townships are therefore often nearer to each other than they are to the distant farms in their own parishes.

The Kingdom of East Anglia during the early Anglo-Saxon period, showing the approximate coastline and the Fens at the time

=== Early Middle Ages and Middle Ages ===
After the end of Roman Britain, there is a break in written records. It is thought that some Iceni may have moved west into the Fens to avoid the Angles, who were migrating across the North Sea from Angeln (modern Schleswig) and settling what would become East Anglia. Surrounded by water and marshes, the Fens provided a safe area that was easily defended and not particularly desirable to invading Anglo-Saxons.

It has been proposed that the names of West Walton, Walsoken and Walpole suggest the native British population, with the Wal- coming from the Old English walh, meaning "foreigner". However, the villages are in close proximity to the old Roman sea wall, so the wal- element is more probably from wal or weal, meaning "wall". Walton is generally believed to mean "wall-town", Walsoken to mean "the district under particular jurisdiction by the wall", and Walpole to mean simply "wall-pole" (Old English wal and pal).

When written records resume in Anglo-Saxon England, the names of a number of peoples of the Fens are recorded in the Tribal Hidage and Christian histories. They include North Gyrwe (Peterborough and Crowland), South Gyrwe (Ely), the Spalda (Spalding), and Bilmingas (part of south Lincolnshire).

View out to the Fens from the roof of Ely Cathedral. The distant fields would have been flooded during the Middle Ages.

In the early Christian period of Anglo-Saxon England, a number of Christians sought the isolation that could be found in the wilderness of the Fens. Later classified as saints, often with close royal links, they include Guthlac, Etheldreda, Pega, and Wendreda. Hermitages on the islands became centres of communities which later developed as monasteries with massive estates. In the Life of Saint Guthlac, a hagiographical account of the life of the East Anglian hermit who lived in the Fens during the early 8th century, Saint Guthlac was described as attacked on several occasions by people he believed were Britons, who were then living in the Fens. However, Bertram Colgrave, in the introduction to one edition, doubts this account, because of the lack of evidence of British survival in the region. British place names in the area are "very few".

Monastic life was disrupted by Danish raids and centuries of settlement from the 8th century but was revived in the mid-10th-century monastic revival. In the 11th century, the whole area was incorporated into a united Anglo-Saxon England. The Fens remained a place of refuge and intrigue. It was here that Alfred Aetheling was brought to be murdered and here where Hereward the Wake based his insurgency against Norman England.

Fenland monastic houses include the so-called Fen Five (Ely Cathedral Priory, Thorney Abbey, Croyland Abbey, Ramsey Abbey and Peterborough Abbey) as well as Spalding Priory. As major landowners, the monasteries played a significant part in the early efforts at drainage of the Fens.

==== Royal Forest ====
During most of the 12th century and the early 13th century, the south Lincolnshire fens were afforested. The area was enclosed by a line from Spalding, along the River Welland to Market Deeping, then along the Car Dyke to Dowsby and across the fens to the Welland. It was deforested in the early 13th century. There is little agreement as to the exact dates of the establishment and demise of the forest, but it seems likely that the deforestation was connected with the Magna Carta or one of its early 13th-century restatements, though it may have been as late as 1240. The forest would have affected the economies of the townships around it and it appears that the present Bourne Eau was constructed at the time of the deforestation, as the town seems to have joined in the general prosperity by about 1280.

Though the forest was about half in Holland (Lincolnshire) and half in Kesteven, it is known as Kesteven Forest.

== Draining the Fens ==
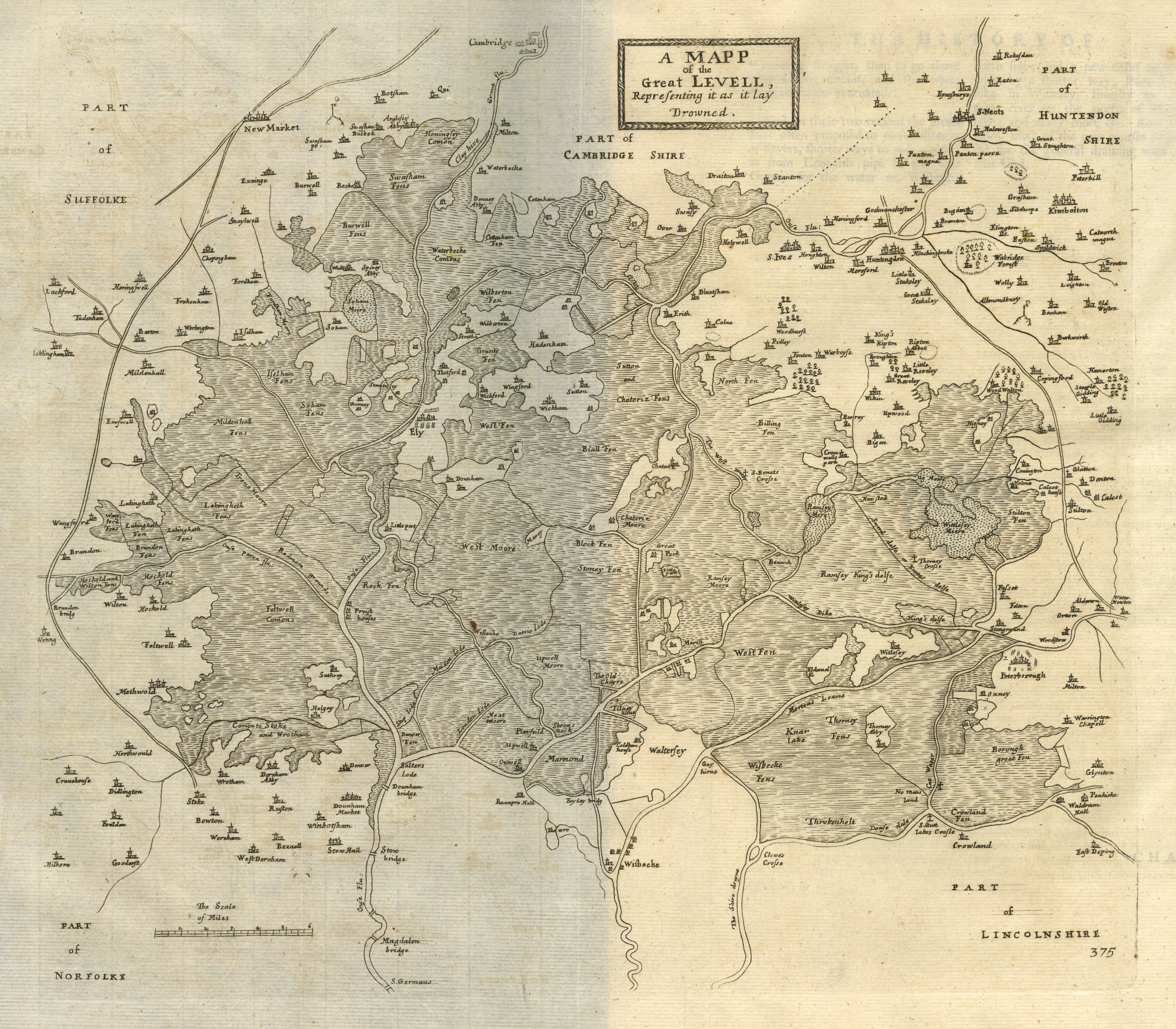
"A Map of the Great Levell, representing it as it lay drowned." from "The history of imbanking and drayning" by William Dugdale (1662)

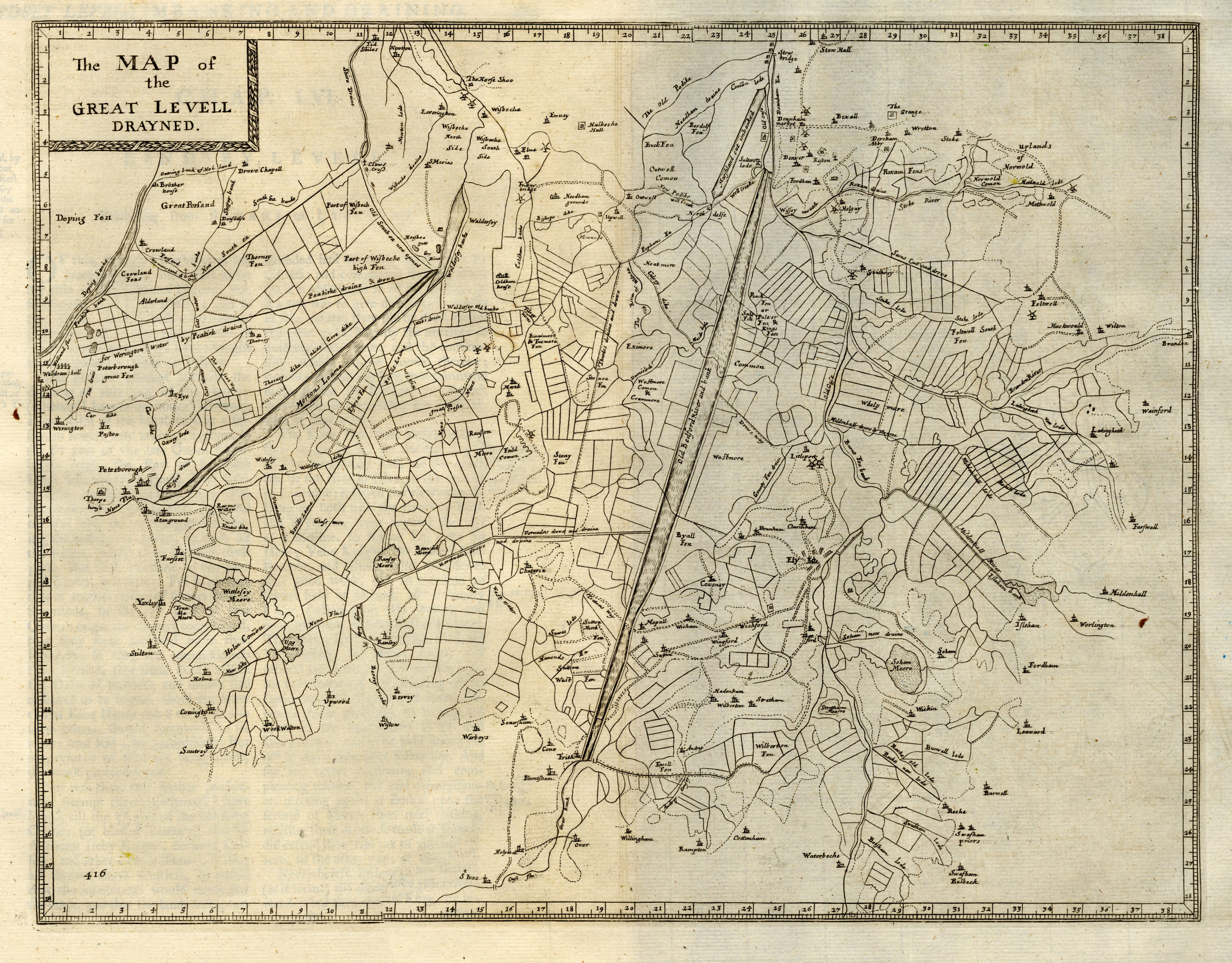
"The Map of the Great Levell drained" from "The history of imbanking and drayning" by William Dugdale (1662)

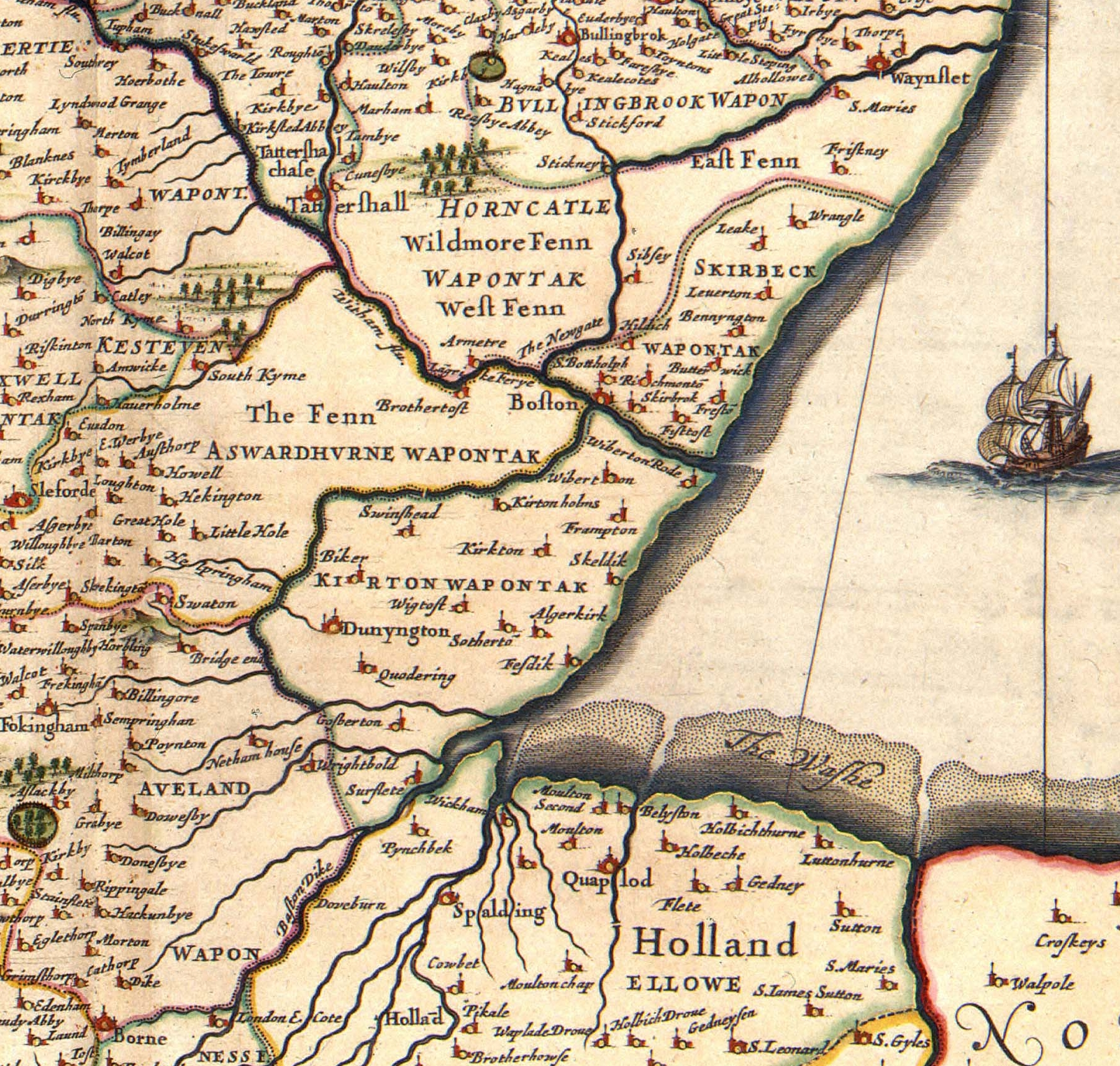
Southern Lincolnshire from a mid-17th-century atlas by Jan Janssonius, showing unsettled areas within undrained fens

=== Early modern attempts to drain the Fens ===
Though some signs of Roman hydraulics survive, and there were also some medieval drainage works, land drainage was begun in earnest during the 1630s by the various investors who had contracts with King Charles I to do so. The leader of one of these syndicates was the Earl of Bedford, who employed Cornelius Vermuyden as engineer. Contrary to popular belief, Vermuyden was not involved with the draining of the Great Fen in Cambridgeshire and Norfolk in the 1630s, but only became involved with the second phase of construction in the 1650s. The scheme was imposed despite huge opposition from locals who were losing their livelihoods based on fishing and wildfowling. Fenmen known as the Fen Tigers tried to sabotage the drainage efforts.

Two cuts were made in the Cambridgeshire Fens to join the River Great Ouse to the sea at King's Lynn – the Old Bedford River and the New Bedford River, the latter being known also as the Hundred Foot Drain. Both cuts were named after the Fourth Earl of Bedford who, along with some gentlemen adventurers (venture capitalists), funded the construction and were rewarded with large grants of the resulting farmland. The work was directed by engineers from the Low Countries. Following this initial drainage, the Fens were still extremely susceptible to flooding, so windpumps were used to pump water away from affected areas. The Company of Adventurers were more formally incorporated in 1663 as the Bedford Level Corporation.

However, their success was short-lived. Once drained of water, the peat shrank, and the fields lowered further. The more effectively they were drained, the worse the problem became, and soon the fields were lower than the surrounding rivers. By the end of the 17th century, the land was under water once again.

Though the three Bedford Levels together formed the biggest scheme, they were not the only ones. Lord Lindsey and his partner Sir William Killigrew had the Lindsey Level inhabited by farmers by 1638, but the onset of the Civil War permitted the destruction of the works until the act of Parliament that led to the formation of the Black Sluice Commissioners, the Black Sluice Drainage Act 1765 (5 Geo. 3. c. 86).

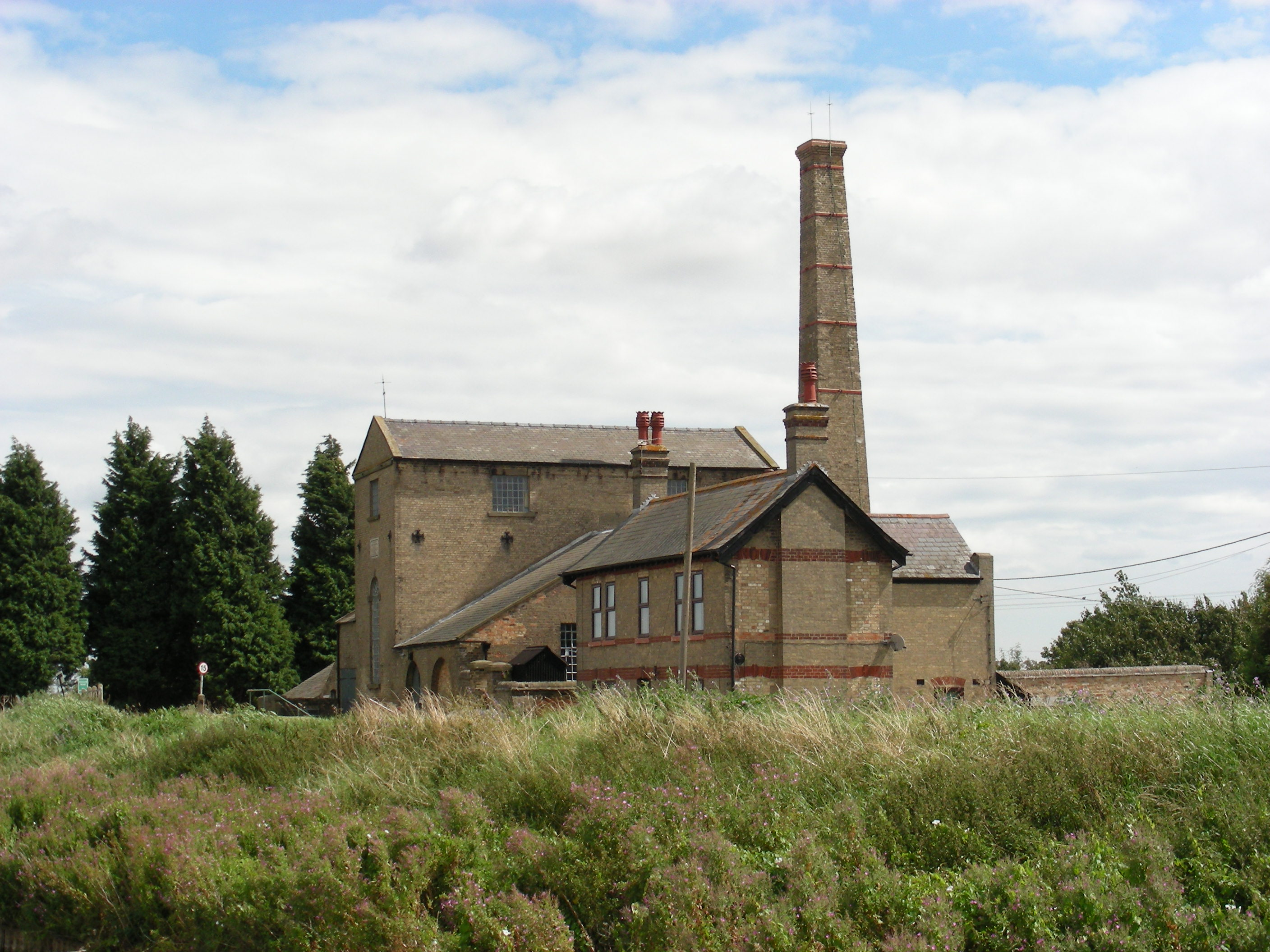
Stretham Old Engine, alongside the River Great Ouse

Many original records of the Bedford Level Corporation, including maps of the Levels, are now held by Cambridgeshire Archives and Local Studies Service at the County Record Office in Cambridge.

=== Modern drainage ===
The major part of the draining of the Fens was effected in the late 18th and early 19th century, again involving fierce local rioting and sabotage of the works. The final success came in the 1820s when windpumps were replaced with powerful coal-powered steam engines, such as Stretham Old Engine, which were themselves replaced with diesel-powered pumps, such as those at Prickwillow Museum and, following World War II, the small electric stations that are still used today.

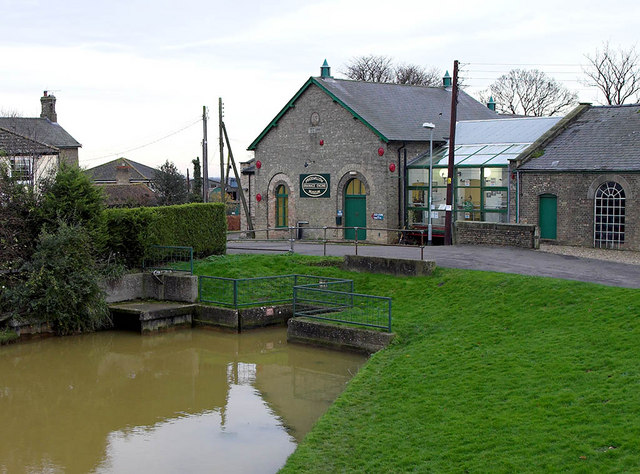
Prickwillow Museum shows the changing face of the Fens and the story of their drainage. It is housed in an old pumping station.

The dead vegetation of the peat remained undecayed because it was deprived of air (the peat being anaerobic). When it was drained, the oxygen of the air reached it, since then the peat has been slowly oxidizing. This, together with the shrinkage on its initial drying and the removal of soil by the wind, has meant that much of the Fens lies below high tide level. As the highest parts of the drained fen are now only a few metres above mean sea level, only sizeable embankments of the rivers, and general flood defences, stop the land from being inundated. Nonetheless, these works are now much more effective than they were.

The Fens today are protected by 60 miles (97 km) of embankments defending against the sea and 96 miles (154 km) of river embankments. Eleven internal drainage board (IDB) groups maintain 286 pumping stations and 3,800 miles (6,100 km) of watercourses, with the combined capacity to pump 16,500 Olympic-size swimming pools in a 24-hour period or to empty Rutland Water in 3 days.

== Modern farming and food manufacturing in the Fens ==
As of 2008, there are estimated to be 4,000 farms in the Fens involved in agriculture and horticulture, including arable, livestock, poultry, dairy, orchards, vegetables and ornamental plants and flowers. They employ about 27,000 people in full-time and seasonal jobs. In turn, they support around 250 businesses involved in food and drink manufacturing and distribution, employing around 17,500 people.

Over 70% of the Fens is involved in environmental stewardship schemes, under which 270 miles (430 km) of hedgerow and 1,780 miles (2,860 km) of ditches are managed, providing large wildlife corridors and habitat for endangered animals such as the water vole.

== Restoration ==
In 2003, the Great Fen Project was initiated to return parts of the Fens to their original pre-agricultural state. The periodic flooding by the North Sea, which renewed the character of the Fenlands, was characterised conventionally by the 1911 Encyclopædia Britannica as "ravaged by serious inundations of the sea". The modern approach is to allow a little farmland to be flooded again and turned into nature reserves. By introducing fresh water, the organisers of the project hope to encourage species such as the snipe, lapwing and bittern. Endangered species such as the fen violet will be seeded.

The Fens Waterways Link is a scheme to restore navigation to some of the drainage works. It is planned to bring the South Forty-Foot Drain and parts of the Car Dyke into use as part of a route between Boston and Cambridge.

== Sports ==
The Fens is the origin of English bandy and Fen skating. It is the base of Great Britain Bandy Association and in Littleport there is a project in place aiming at building an indoor stadium for ice sports. If successful, it will have the largest sheet of ice in the country with both a bandy pitch and a speed skating oval.

== Settlements ==
Many historic cities, towns and villages have grown up in the fens, sited chiefly on the few areas of raised ground. These include:

- Boston, port and administrative centre of the Borough of Boston
- Chatteris, a market town
- City of Ely (meaning "Isle of Eels"), whose cathedral – one of the Fen Five monasteries – is known as the "Ship of the Fens"; administrative centre of the East Cambridgeshire District Council
- Cottenham, one of the five Silicon Fen-Edge Villages strung out along the Fens' southernmost border, just north of Cambridge in Cambridgeshire – from west to east: Willingham, Rampton, Cottenham, Landbeach and Waterbeach;
- Crowland, one of the Fen Five monasteries; also a medieval triangular bridge;
- Donington, birthplace of the explorer Matthew Flinders
- Guyhirn, bridging point over the Nene and home to a 17th-century Puritan chapel
- Holbeach, a market town
- Littleport, a large village approximately 6 miles (9.7 km) north of Ely
- Little Thetford, settled on a boulder clay island within the fens since the Bronze Age, 3 miles (4.8 km) south of Ely
- Long Sutton, a market town and home to UK's largest food cannery
- March, a market town and administrative centre of the Fenland District
- Market Deeping, a market town
- Parson Drove, the village was the last location of a mobile Woad mill.
- City of Peterborough, the largest of the many settlements along the fen edge and sometimes called the "Gateway to the Fens"; its cathedral is one of the Fen Five monasteries; administrative centre of the Peterborough Unitary Authority
- Ramsey, a market town; one of the Fen Five monasteries
- Ring's End named after an early drainage project.
- Soham, a market town.
- Spalding, a market town, administrative centre of South Holland, and famed for its annual Flower Parade held from 1959 to 2013 which was revived in 2023.
- Thorney, one of the Fen Five monasteries; later model village and agricultural estates of the Dukes of Bedford
- Tydd St Giles a low lying village formerly in the hundred of Wisbech.
- Tydd St Mary a parish in South Holland, five miles north of Wisbech.
- Walsoken, formerly in Norfolk, but part of which was merged with Wisbech in the 20th century.
- Whittlesey, a market town; annual Straw Bear Festival
- Wisbech ("Capital of the Fens"), a market town and port.

Ancient sites include:

- Flag Fen, a Bronze Age settlement
- Must Farm, a Bronze Age settlement
- Stonea Camp, an Iron Age hill fort
- Wisbech Castle, the site of a Norman castle.
- March Sconce, a Civil War fieldwork.

== In popular culture and media ==
The so-called "Flag of the Fens", designed by resident vexillographer James Bowman in 2016. Although it has yet to be registered with the Flag Institute, the design has gained widespread popularity as the de facto flag of the region. The tiger is a homage to the term "Fen Tiger", which was originally coined in the 17th century to describe locals who exhibited fierce resistance to the drainage schemes in the Fens. The yellow symbolises the agricultural prosperity of the Fens, while the blue represents both the natural and man-made waterways of the region.

Some authors have featured the Fens repeatedly in their work. For example:

- John Gordon, writer of adolescent fiction and author of The Giant Under The Snow, drew inspiration for many of his supernatural fantasies from the Fens. His books with Fenland themes include: Ride The Wind, Fen Runners and The House On The Brink, which was based on Peckover House in Wisbech.
- Joy Ellis set her multiple detective series in the Fens: DI Nikki Galena series, Detective Matt Ballard series and DI Rowan Jackman & DS Marie Evans series, soon to be turned into a television adaptation (see below). Her stand-alone psychological fiction Guide Star is also set in the Fens.
- Ariana Franklin "Mistress of the Art of Death" series set in the Fens.
- Peter F. Hamilton sets a number of his science-fiction novels in the Fens, including Mindstar Rising and A Quantum Murder.
- M. R. James set several of his ghost stories in the Fens.
- Jim Kelly set The Water Clock, The Moon Tunnel and The Funeral Owl in the Fens.
- Philippa Pearce, a children's author, set many of her books in the Fens, for example Tom's Midnight Garden.
- Gladys Mitchell, prolific writer of detective fiction, took her eccentric sleuth, the psychiatrist Mrs Lestrange Bradley, to the Fens in several books, notably The Worsted Viper, Wraiths and Changelings and The Mudflats of the Dead.
- Robert Louis Stevenson's The Black Arrow has several chapters set in the Fens.
- Nick Warburton wrote a series of radio plays entitled On Mardle Fen, one of the longest-running series of plays on BBC Radio 4.
- Susanna Gregory's Matthew Bartholomew chronicles' title character is a fictional physician living in 14th-century Cambridge.
- G. A. Henty's book Beric the Briton mentions some sections in the Fens.
- Norah Lofts features a character called Ethelreda Benedict, who comes from a small island in the Fens in the 17th century, in the second book of her ‘House’ trilogy, The House at Old Vine.
- Louis L'Amour's To The Far Blue Mountains, the central character Barnabas Sackett from Sackett's Land returns to his home in the Fens one last time in the opening chapter.

The following fictions, or substantial portions of them, are set in the Fens:

- Joy Ellis: D.I. Nikki Galena series, Jackman and Evans series, Detective Matt Ballard series, Guide Star
- Sabine Baring-Gould: Cheap Jack Zita
- Hal Foster: Prince Valiant
- Martha Grimes: The Case Has Altered, set in and around Algarkirk, Lincolnshire
- Georgette Heyer: A Civil Contract
- Charles Kingsley: Hereward the Wake
- Louis L'Amour: Sackett's Land
- Dorothy L. Sayers: The Nine Tailors
- Gregory Maguire: Confessions of an Ugly Stepsister
- Graham Swift: Waterland (made into a film, listed below)
- Robert Westall: Futuretrack 5
- Eric Flint and Andrew Dennis: 1635: A Parcel of Rogues
- Philip Pullman: Northern Lights
- Lesley Glaister: Honour Thy Father.
- P. D. James: Death of an Expert Witness
- Constance Heaven: Lord of Ravensley
- Paul Kingsnorth: The Wake
- Jordy Rosenberg: Confessions of the Fox
- Stella Tillyard: The Great Level
- H. G. Wells: The Croquet Player
- Jill Dawson: The Tell-Tale Heart
- Caryl Churchill: Fen

Some films have large portions set in the Fenlands:

- Dad Savage (1998), starring Patrick Stewart, was set and filmed in the King's Lynn area.
- Waterland (1992), directed by Stephen Gyllenhaal.

And television:

- Fenlands 1945 documentary film
- The 1974 Look and Read series Cloud Burst was set and filmed in the Fens.
- The episode Three Miles Up of the 1995 BBC series Ghosts was set in the Fens.
- Thomas & Friends has a bridge on the Brendam Branch called the Fenland Track that crosses over a marsh.
- The 2019 TV series Wild Bill was set around Boston, Lincolnshire.

Music:

- Ralph Vaughan Williams: In the Fen Country

Video games also have been set in the Fens:

- The Bedford Level appears in the video game Tom Clancy's EndWar as a possible battlefield.
- The Lost Crown: A Ghost-Hunting Adventure is set in a fictional town called Saxton, located in the Fens.
- In the game Sir, You Are Being Hunted the Fens is an area that the game can randomly generate.

== See also ==
- Prickwillow Museum, the changing face of the Fens, including restored drainage engines
- Whittlesey Museum, a social history museum located on the ground floor of a 19th-century Town Hall.
- Wisbech & Fenland Museum, one of the oldest purpose-built museums in the UK.
- Fen skating, a sport for which the Fens were famous
- Gilbert Heathcote's tunnel, a drainage project in the 1630s
- Hereward the Wake, who led the English resistance to the Norman Conquest from the fens
- High Fens, between Belgium and Germany
- Pinchbeck Engine, a museum of fen drainage based around the longest-working beam engine and scoopwheel
- Somerset Levels, a similar area of wetlands in the southwest of England
- Wicken Fen, one of the few remaining undrained fens, owned by the National Trust
- Devil's Dyke, Cambridgeshire, a long straight ditch and bank
- The Broads, the navigable waterway system which crosses the fenland of Norfolk and Suffolk
- History of malaria
- Grand Kankakee Marsh, a former major wetland in Indiana and Illinois, USA, with a history of extensive drainage and farming similar to the English Fens.
- Great Black Swamp, a former major wetland in Indiana, Ohio, and Michigan, USA, with a history of extensive drainage and farming similar to the English Fens.
- Tulare Lake, a former major wetland in California, USA, with a history of extensive drainage and farming similar to the English Fens.
