= Tongue End =

Village in Lincolnshire, England

Coordinates: 52.75371°N 0.2801°W

- Location within Lincolnshire
- Population: 41
- OS grid reference: TF161187
  - London: 90 mi (140 km) S
- Civil parish: Deeping St. Nicholas
- District: South Holland
- Shire county: Lincolnshire
- Region: East Midlands
- Country: England
- Sovereign state: United Kingdom
- Post town: SPALDING
- Postcode district: PE11
- Dialling code: 01775
- Police: Lincolnshire
- Fire: Lincolnshire
- Ambulance: East Midlands
- UK Parliament: South Holland and The Deepings

Tongue End is a small village in the South Holland district of Lincolnshire, England. It is situated 4 miles (6 km) east from Bourne and 6 miles (10 km) south-west from Spalding, and alongside the Counter Drain that runs between Baston and Pode Hole.

Tongue End comprises Victorian red-brick farmworkers' cottages and early 20th-century former council houses. It once had a village school (built in 1876), and three public houses.

The name is said to refer to the shape of the land between the rivers Glen and Bourne Eau. There is a location on the Stamford Canal which is similarly formed and has the same name.

Tongue End falls within the drainage area of the Welland and Deepings Internal Drainage Board. Gilbert Heathcote's tunnel drained into the Counter Drain nearby.

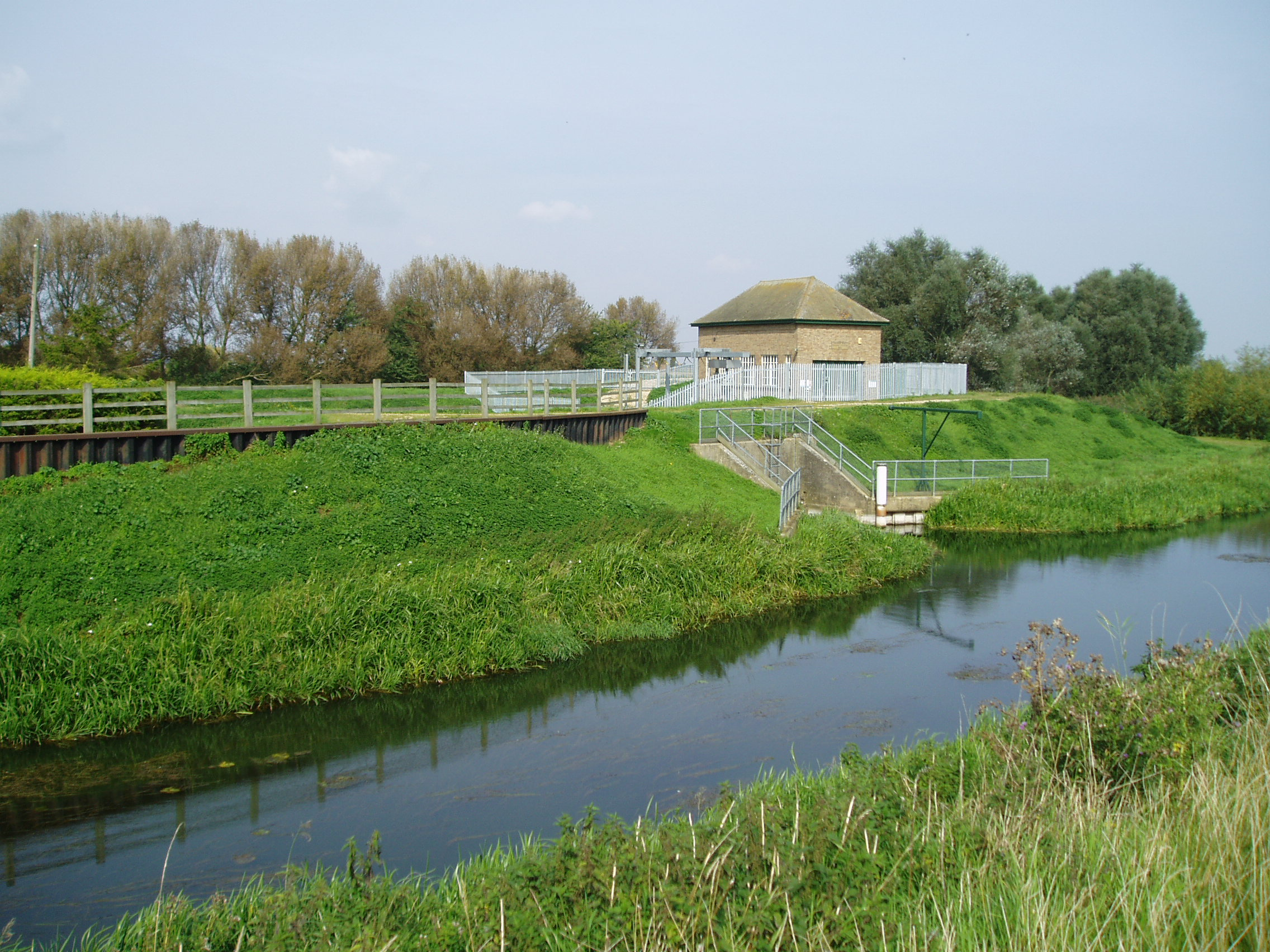
The pumping station (built 1966) at the confluence of the River Glen and the Bourne Eau.

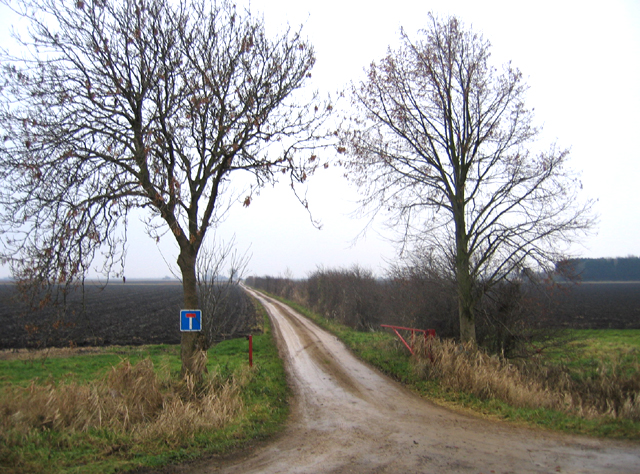
Track near Tongue End.

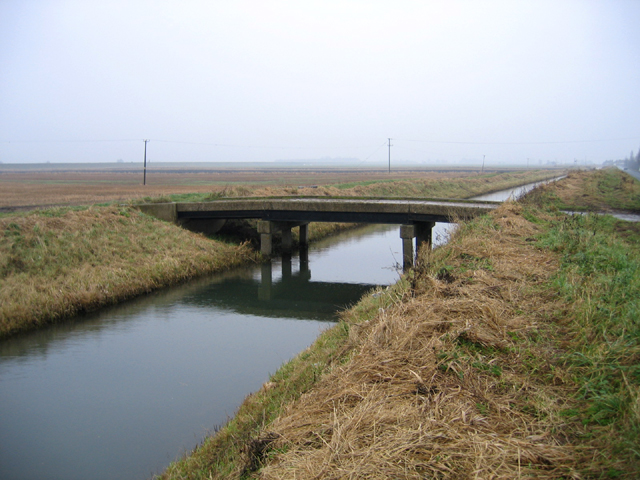
Bridge over the Counter Drain

== See also ==
- Bourne Eau
- Counter Drain railway station
