= Civil contract =

Civil contract may refer to:

- Contract, a promise enforced by civil law
- Civil Contract (Armenia), a political party
- Civil union, a legally recognized relationship similar to marriage

== See also ==
- A Civil Contract, a novel by Georgette Heyer
