= Eastgate, Bourne =

Historic area in Bourne

Coordinates: 52.7653°N 0.3652°W

Eastgate
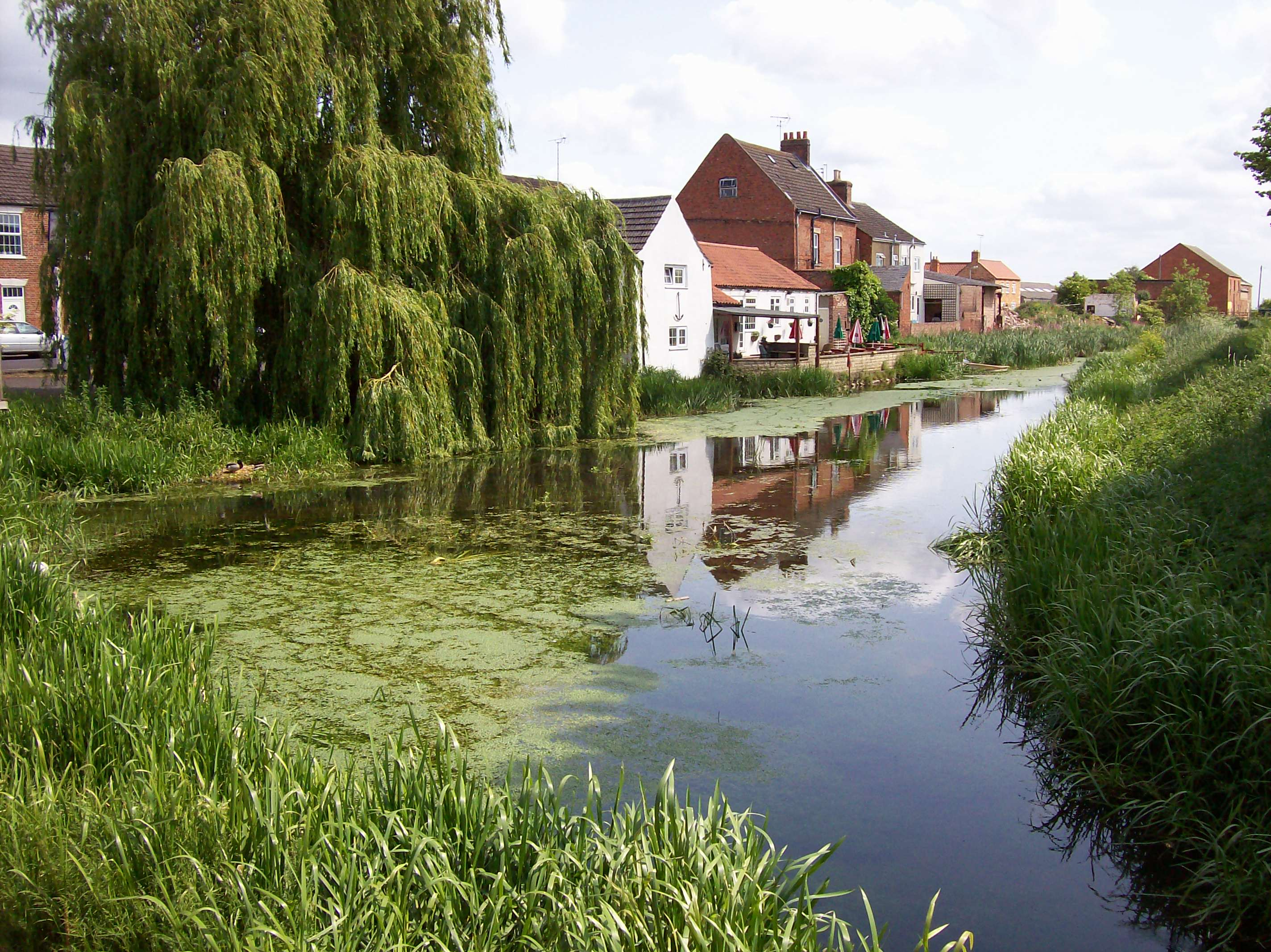
- Bourne Eau at Eastgate

- Location within Lincolnshire
- OS grid reference: TF104198
  - London: 90 mi (140 km) S
- Civil parish: Bourne
- District: South Kesteven
- Shire county: Lincolnshire
- Region: East Midlands
- Country: England
- Sovereign state: United Kingdom
- Post town: BOURNE
- Postcode district: PE10
- Dialling code: 01778
- Police: Lincolnshire
- Fire: Lincolnshire
- Ambulance: East Midlands
- UK Parliament: Grantham and Bourne

Eastgate is a historic street and suburb in the town of Bourne, Lincolnshire, running alongside the Bourne Eau. It was associated with the town's pottery industry in mediaeval times, which came to an end after a fire in 1637, and later became the centre of Bourne's automotive industry in the 20th century. It is the site of several notable buildings, including The Anchor Inn public house, and Eastgate House, a large Regency style property that was home to racing driver Raymond Mays.

== History ==
=== Early history ===
A single piece of worked flint, dating from the early Neolithic to late Bronze Age, was found at Eastgate in 1998.

The pottery industry in Eastgate can be dated back to at least the late 12th century. An archaeological survey in 2002 found the remains of a building dating to the 13th century, with a large amount of sherds located at the same site. This building had fallen out of use in the 16th century. Kilns dating from the 14th and 16th centuries were also found at another location to the east end of the street, attached to a house and workshop, during excavations for roadworks and building extensions. However, in 1637, there was a fire that destroyed much of the street, and this brought an end to the pottery industry.

Notley's Mill was built in 1729, and was located on Victoria Place, to the west of Eastgate, bordering Abbey Lawn, with a large water storage pond behind it. The Bourne Eau was formerly navigable up to Eastgate, where it meets the Car Dyke. Owing to this, by the early 19th century, there were many warehouses in Eastgate that took advantage of the Eau, with ships carrying up to ten tons of cargo being capable of navigating it in 1816.

=== Nineteenth century ===
Coal was brought into a wharf at Eastgate along the Bourne Eau, until it became easier to transport by train. The coming of the railways, in conjunction with a lack of maintenance, led to the Eau eventually becoming unnavigable, although it continued to flow through Eastgate, albeit with many sections running through culverts. By 1857, it was said that only occasionally did boats visit Bourne. A United Reformed Church was built on the west of the street in 1846, which also operated a Sunday school; in 1874 this had 235 children and 18 teachers. The building was also used by other groups, including the Boys’ Brigade and Girls’ Brigade.

In 1857, a national school was opened on the nearby Willoughby Road, designed by Edward Browning, with funds gathered from the congregation, and by 1885 it had an average attendance of 97. The school closed on 31 October 1903, with the students transferred to the school on Abbey Road, and two years later the building re-opened as an Anglican mission church. The mission church closed in 1950, and after briefly being used by British Racing Motors to store steel, the building was demolished in 1960, replaced by two bungalows.

There was previously a pub called the Old Wharf Inn in Eastgate, whose location is unknown. Another pub, the Woolpack, which was also used as a butcher, was listed for let in 1848.

On the afternoon of 30 August 1878, a heavy storm resulted in the death of an eleven-year-old boy from Eastgate. In 1880, Queen's Bridge, located on the west end of Eastgate, was replaced with a new concrete structure. The Bourne Eau at the site of the bridge was cleared out in October 1898, revealing a ford or crossing, possibly of Roman origin. The Eau occasionally overflowed its banks, and this resulted in a flood circa 1930.

=== World War II and later history ===
During World War II, on 4 May 1941, a Luftwaffe bomber crashed into the Butcher's Arms, a local pub, destroying it. Seven people on the ground were killed, including the publican and his wife (Charles and Fanny Lappage), and three soldiers billeted there. Six other soldiers who were staying in the building next to the pub were injured as a result of the crash, while the pilot survived and was taken prisoner. On 11 August 1964, an unexploded bomb was discovered on the site of the Butcher's Arms, by then in use as a garage; the bomb was removed the following day by a bomb disposal unit from RAF Newton. Another suspected bomb was discovered on 11 January 2022 at an auctioneer's to the west of Eastgate, however, it was declared not to be a threat by explosive ordnance disposal specialists, who removed it for destruction.

In 1973, Notley's Mill was demolished, in light of high maintenance costs, marking the closure of the last working mill in Bourne. Queen's Bridge was replaced in 2013, to bring it in line with the 40 tonne weight capacity guidelines (it had previously only had a maximum weight capacity of 7.5 tonnes), with works finishing in December.

The Delaine Bus Museum is located nearby on Spalding Road, on the former site of the English Racing Automobiles workshop, north of Eastgate. The United Reformed Church closed in 2024, due to a dwindling congregation; its final service was held on 23 March and was attended by 100 people. The building was subsequently put up for sale by the church synod.

== Buildings ==
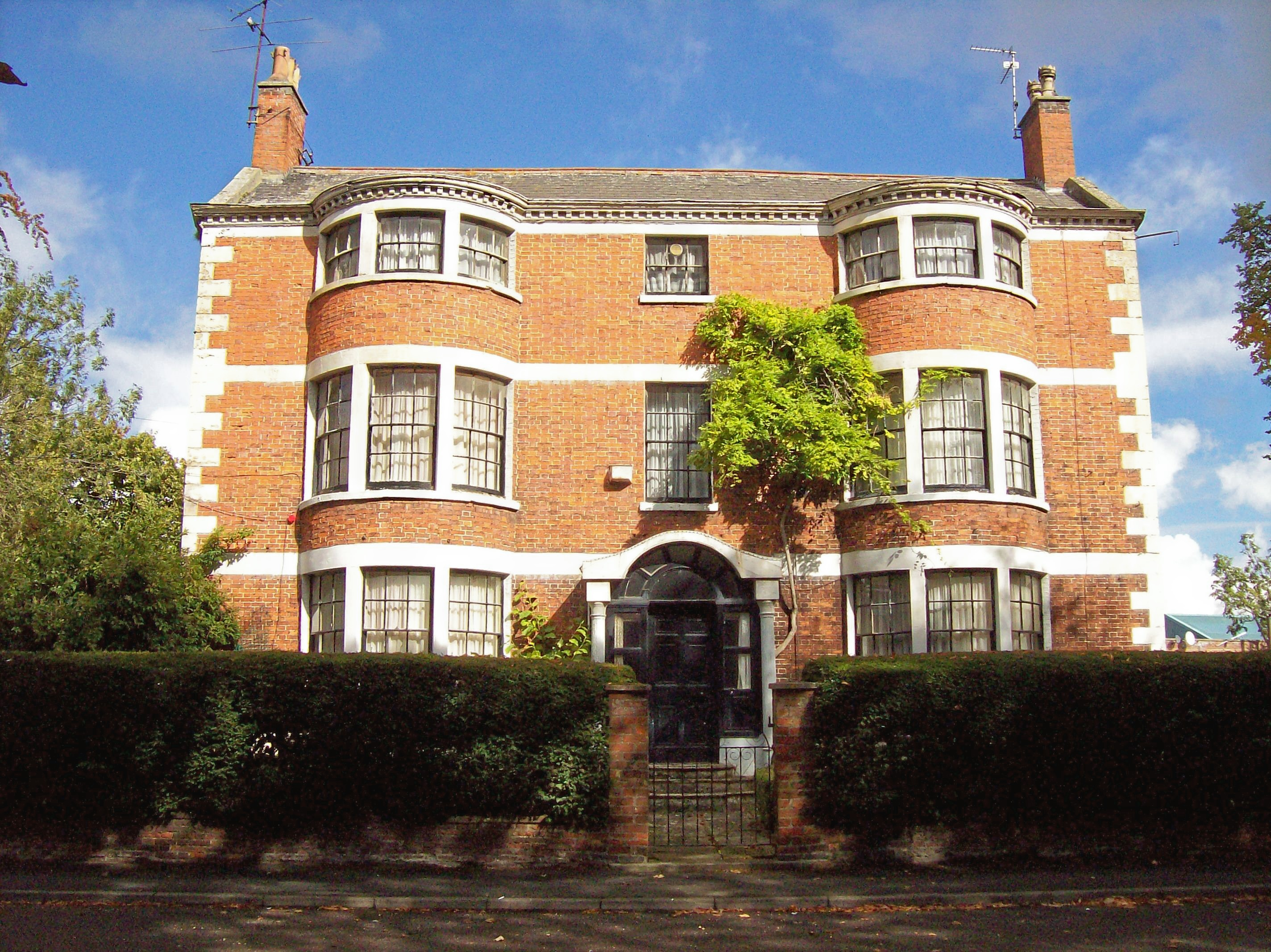
Eastgate House

=== Eastgate House ===
Eastgate House was erected in the late 18th century (the side door has a date stamp of 1769, alongside a coat of arms). It was bought by Thomas Chamberlain, a miller, in 1794; the property passed to his son, John, who in 1827 built a brewery, bakery, barns, and stables on the grounds by it. He proved unable to afford this expansion, and so the house was listed for sale by his trustees. It was bought by Thomas Mays, a fellmonger, in 1856, making it the family home. His grandson, Raymond Mays, was born there on 1 August 1899, who founded English Racing Automobiles and later British Racing Motors, both of which were run from workshops located behind the house, the latter of which at one point employed 120 people. The aviator Amy Johnson frequently visited the house, and was an admirer of Mays. The house was given Grade II listed status in 1949. After Mays' death in 1980, the house was sold, but a commemorative plaque was installed on the wall outside it, which was restored in 1993. It was listed for sale again in 2024, with an asking price of £800,000.

The house is built in Regency style, and has three storeys, featuring two rounded bays on its front façade, spanning all three storeys, with a Welsh slate roof. Behind it, there are several outbuildings, alongside a walled garden.

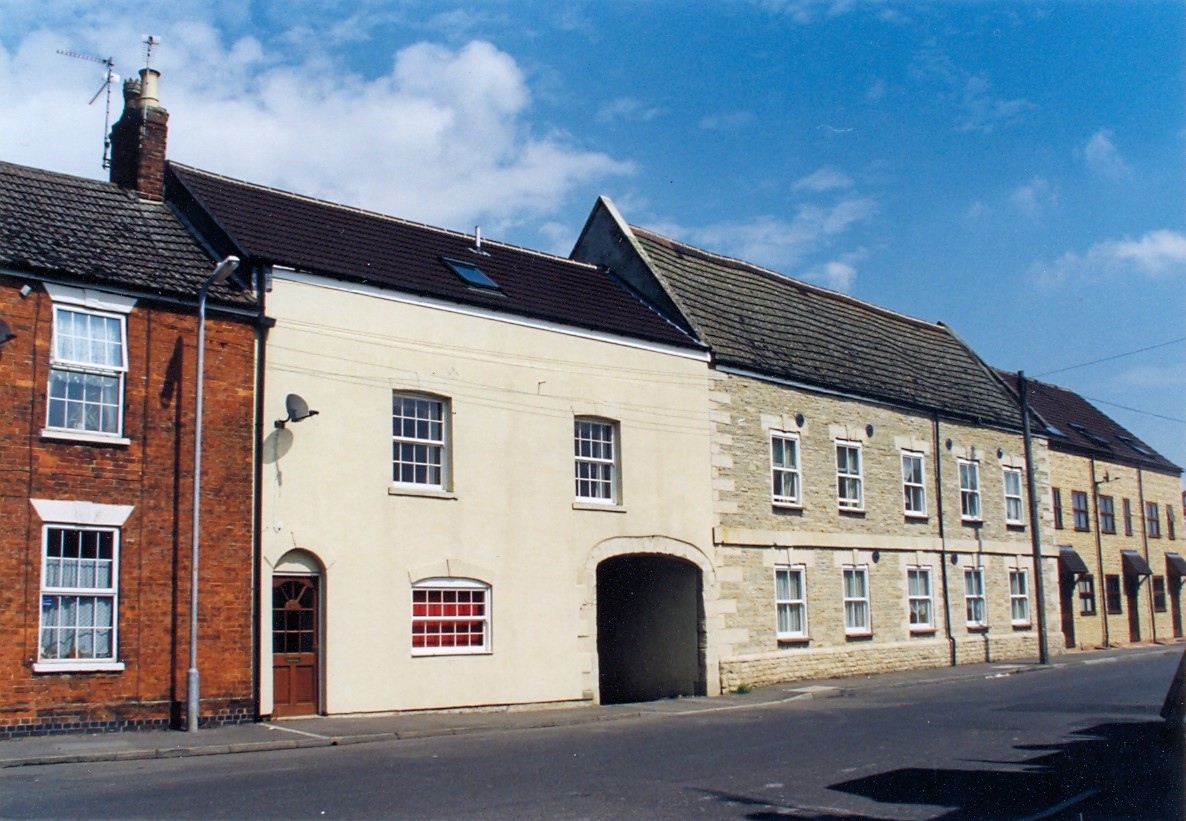
Old Tannery

=== Old Tannery ===
Construction of the Old Tannery began in the late 17th century and completed in the late 18th century. It served as a tannery for some time, hence the name, and it includes a carriage arch; the building is two storeys tall. It is presently divided into two properties, 45 and 47 Eastgate, the latter of which has a modern concrete tile roof.

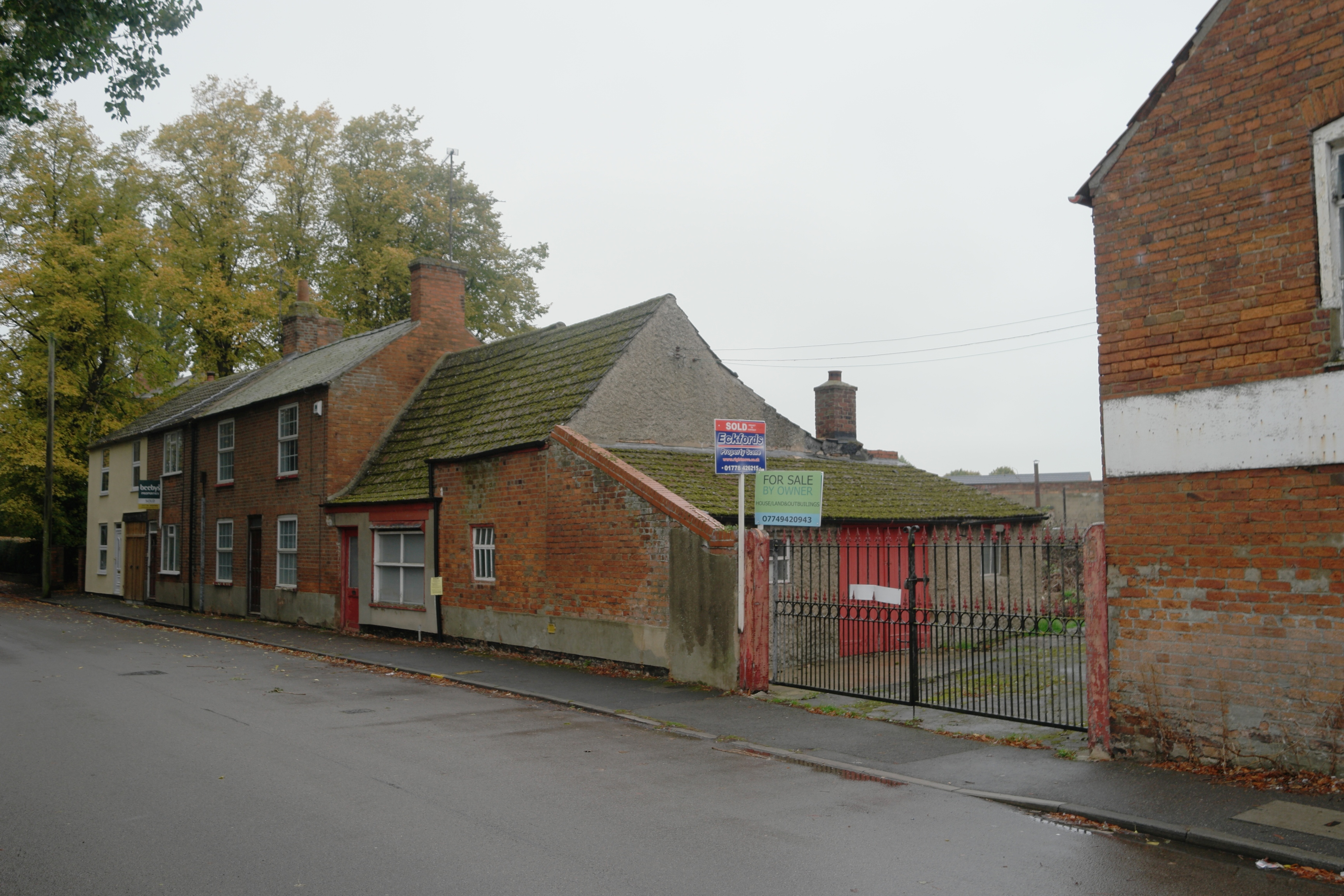
13 Eastgate

=== 13 Eastgate ===
There was formerly a small single-storey house at 13 Eastgate, dating to the 18th century, or earlier. It served as a shop for some time, and as such included a 19th-century shop-front window. A two-storey barn was attached to it, as well as a single-storey wing. It was demolished at some point prior to 2008, and was subsequently de-listed by English Heritage.

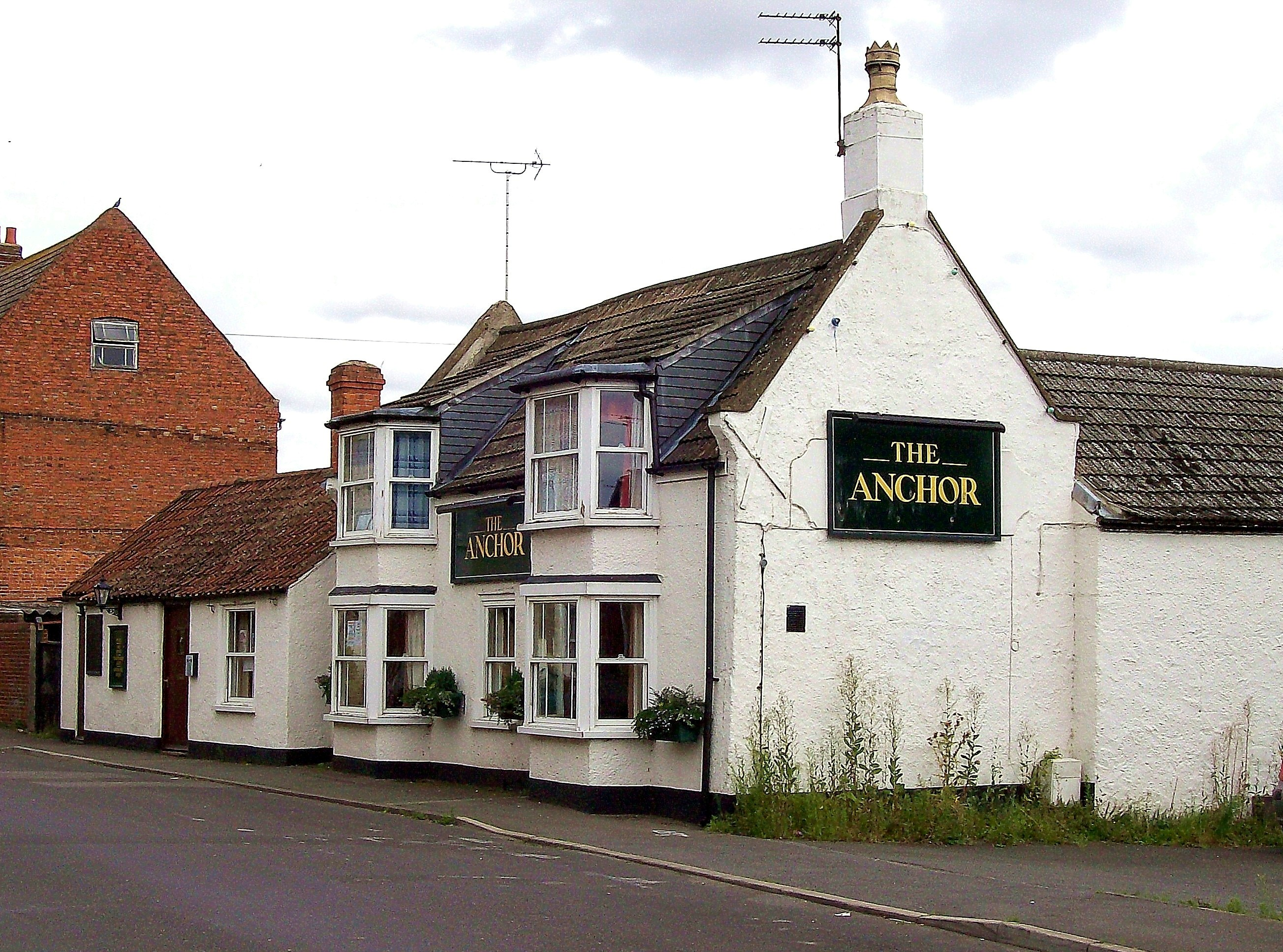
The Anchor Inn

=== The Anchor Inn ===
The Grade II listed Anchor Inn, which is dated to the 18th century, is the only pub that remains open on the street. The building has two storeys, and is small and roughcast, with the front containing 2 chamfered bays with windows, which on the second storey form snoped dormers, with a pantiled roof. The pub's patio backs onto the Bourne Eau.
