= Pode Hole =

Village in Lincolnshire, England

Coordinates: 52.78214°N 0.20288°W

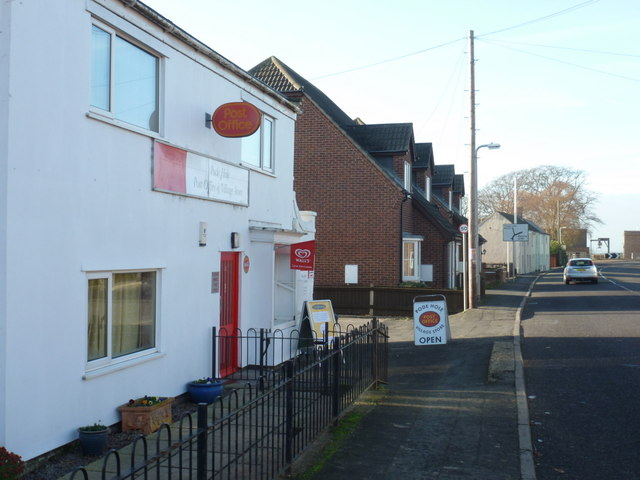
- Pode Hole post office

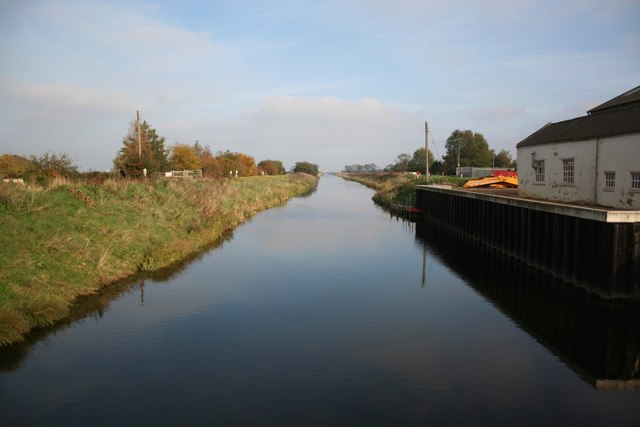
- Vernatt's Drain

- Location within Lincolnshire
- OS grid reference: TF213220
  - London: 85 mi (137 km) S
- Civil parish: Pinchbeck
- District: South Holland
- Shire county: Lincolnshire
- Region: East Midlands
- Country: England
- Sovereign state: United Kingdom
- Post town: SPALDING
- Postcode district: PE11
- Dialling code: 01775
- Police: Lincolnshire
- Fire: Lincolnshire
- Ambulance: East Midlands
- UK Parliament: South Holland and The Deepings

Pode Hole is a village in South Holland, Lincolnshire, England. It is 2 miles (3.2 km) from Spalding and 10 miles from Bourne. The village lies at the confluence of several drainage channels, where two pumping stations discharge water into Vernatt's Drain from land in Deeping Fen to the South and West. Water from Pinchbeck South Fen to the North is also lifted into Vernatt's Drain. The village arose to service the pumping stations.

The village is largely a ribbon development stretching from the pumping stations and the Fishermans Arms public house along Bourne Road toward Spalding. The village post office and small shop is now also a bed and breakfast, and an outside catering service.

No separate population statistic is available for Pode Hole. The best available report is for the whole Pinchbeck civil parish, which covers several settlements north and east of Spalding with a total of 5,153. At the 2011 census population details can be found under the civil parish of Pinchbeck.

The name may well be a reference to a marshy location, possibly with a population of frogs and toads. Pode Hole farm, near Thorney probably derives its name the same way.

Pode Hole has one of the earliest rain gauge records of precipitation, beginning in 1726.

Pode Hole falls within the drainage area of the Welland and Deepings Internal Drainage Board, successors to the original Deeping Fen commissioners.

== Pumping stations ==
Pumping stations were installed because the cill at Vernatt's Sluice, where the drain discharges into the Welland above Spalding, was higher than the cill of the precursor sluices at Pode Hole. The fen drains could not naturally discharge into Vernatt's Drain. There was a history of windmill-driven pumps and later small steam engines across the Fens but the two engines at Pode Hole were the first of the large scale pumping efforts, and an encouragement to later schemes.

John Rennie was consulted in 1818, and he proposed diverting the upper reaches of Vernatt's Drain from the Welland to the Witham to improve the fall. It is unclear if this would have worked, but the funds were not available and a later proposal for steam engines at Pode Hole was interrupted by his death. In the end an engineer called Benjamin Bevan appointed by the commissioners placed orders for two beam engines from separate engineers, Fenton and Murray of Leeds, and Butterley of Derby. The first was 60hp, the second 80 hp. Butterley supplied both scoop wheels. The engines started work early in 1825, and continued in use until 1925.

A third steam engine was erected on the North bank of Vernatt's drain to lift water from Pinchbeck South Fen. This operated between the early 1830s until the end of the century. This was built as much because that fen was under separate control for those years as because the capacity was required. The water from the South drain is piped under Vernatt's drain to the Pode Hole station, much as it was tunnelled before the 1830 engine was built. (The idea of a tunnel under a river is not unique. Not far away at Bourne South Fen Gilbert Heathcote's tunnel was built under the River Glen, and might have been the inspiration for the system at Pode Hole.)

The beam engines were maintained in storage until 1952, but then scrapped. Diesel engines were already in use across the fens when Pode Hole was modernised in 1925. The current Ruston diesel engines date from 1964 and vertical axis axial flow Foster Gwynnes pumps are driven by David Brown gear boxes. The second station alongside uses electric pumps and was built in the 1960s.

The original pumping station building is a feature in the village and is in use for workshops and a small museum. The by-laws of the original commissioners are prominently posted on the outside.

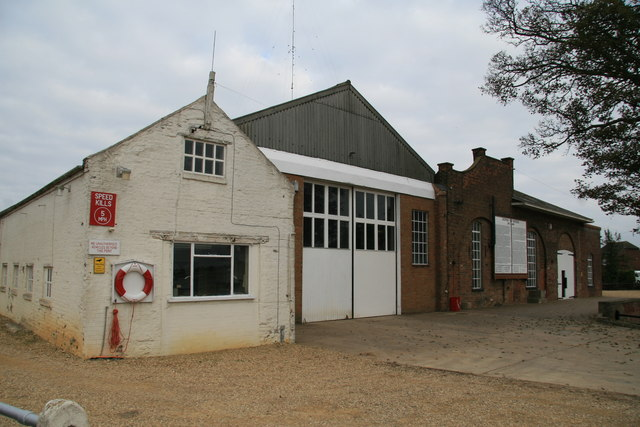
Original pumping station

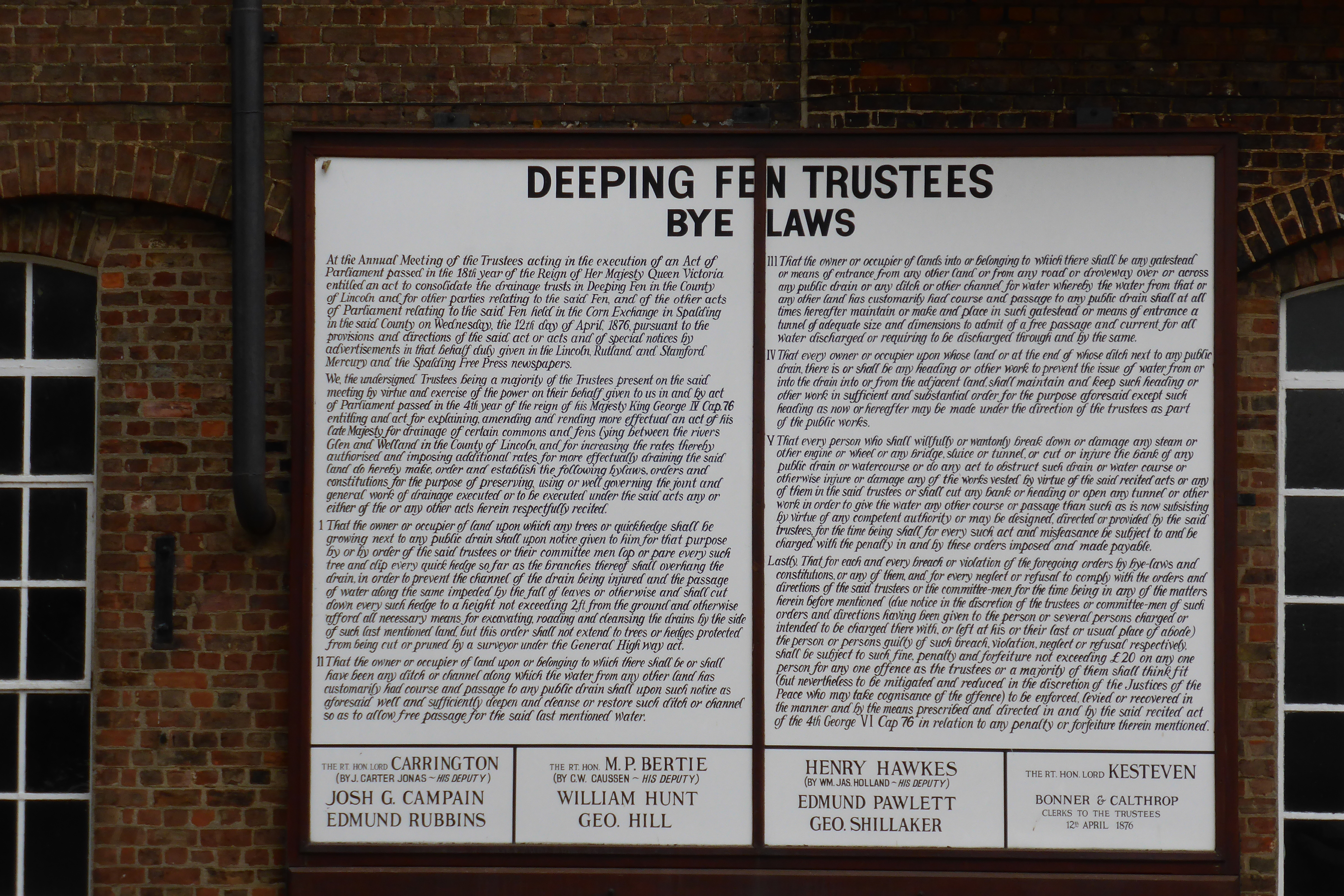
Bylaws posted on the old pump station

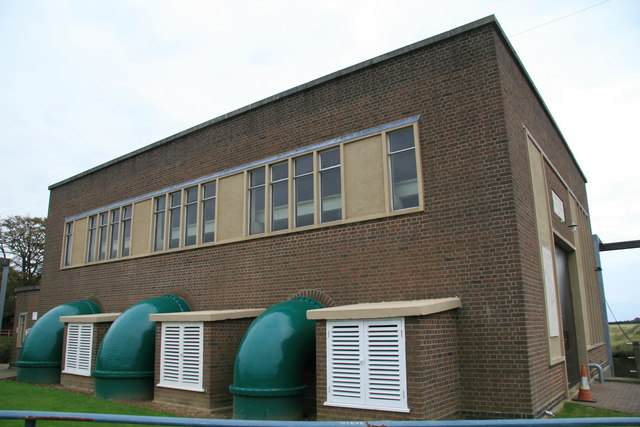
Modern pumping station

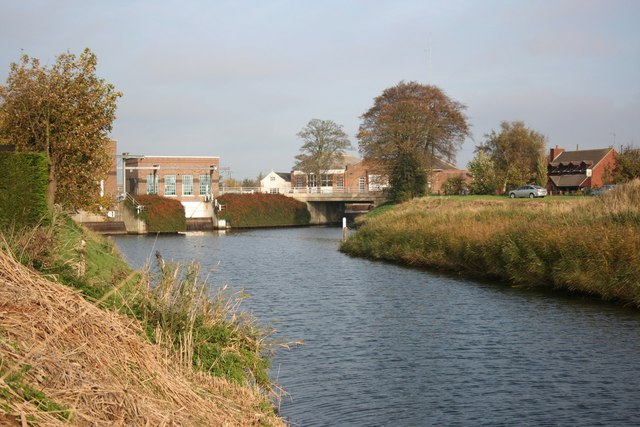
Electric pumping station, known as the Adventurers pumping station

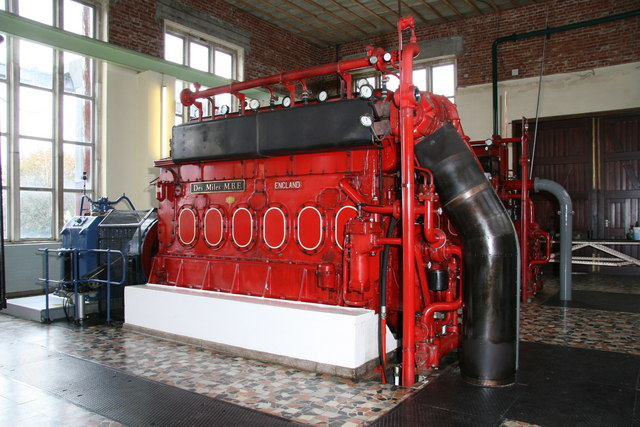
Ruston diesel engine

== See also ==
- Pinchbeck Engine - an intact beam engine & scoop wheel pumping station maintained as a museum by the Welland and Deeping IDB
