= Gilbert Heathcote's tunnel =

Tunnel in Lincolnshire, England

Coordinates: 52.7483°N 0.29816°W

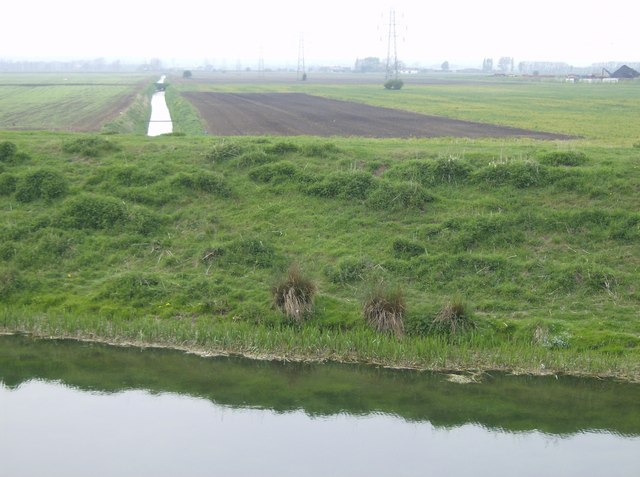
Looking along the original drain from above the source of the tunnel

Gilbert Heathcote's tunnel was an engineering project dating from the 1630s as one of the earliest modern attempts to drain The Fens in Lincolnshire. Rendered obsolete by the mechanical drainage improvements after World War II, it was finally removed in 1991.

It carried water, under gravity, from Bourne South Fen, Thurlby Fen and Northorpe Fen to the Counter Drain and thence to Deeping Fen. A tunnel was required under the River Glen which was (and still is) artificially banked with a level some 3 metres above the surrounding lands and above the Counter Drain. The Counter Drain was pumped further downstream by wind-driven machinery, erected later. At the time of construction Deeping Fen was still inundated.

In 1871 the Bourne South Fen Drainage District was formed to take over the drainage, which had been in the hands of adventurers, and from 1872 a succession of steam engines were used to assist the flow through the tunnel.

The location is around 500m upstream on the Glen of the confluence with the Bourne Eau. Tongue End is the nearest settlement. The modern by-road alongside the original drain to the tunnel is still called Tunnel Bank.

The Gilbert Heathcote for whom it is named appears to be the grandfather of Sir Gilbert Heathcote, 1st Baronet, and an ancestor of the first Baron Aveland. That family later inherited nearby Grimsthorpe Castle, but must have had land and associations with this area to claim the title of Aveland.

The area drained falls within the area of the Welland and Deepings Internal Drainage Board.
