= A Civil Contract =

1961 Regency romance novel by Georgette Heyer

- First edition
- Author: Georgette Heyer
- Cover artist: Arthur Barbosa
- Language: English
- Genre: Regency, Romance
- Publisher: William Heinemann
- Publication date: 1961
- Publication place: United Kingdom
- Media type: Print (Hardback & Paperback)
- Pages: 384 pp

A Civil Contract is a Regency era novel by Georgette Heyer, first published in October 1961 by Heinemann in the UK and in January 1962 by G. P. Putnam's Sons in the US. Set between 1814–1815, the story centres on a bankrupted viscount who reluctantly enters a marriage of convenience with a wealthy merchant's daughter.

== Plot summary ==
After the death of his father, the 5th Viscount Lynton, in a riding accident, twenty-six-year-old Captain Adam Deveril is summoned home from his regiment in the closing year of the Peninsular War. On arrival he discovers that his Lincolnshire estates are bankrupted by debt. Lacking any means of restoring his family's wealth, and with his mother and two sisters - Charlotte and Lydia - to support, he begins liquidating his assets. He also mentions the necessity of selling Fontley Priory, his historic family home, on a visit to Lord Oversley, with whose beautiful daughter Julia he had been in love, but must now relinquish.

Oversley suggests that Adam listen instead to the proposal of his friend Mr Jonathan Chawleigh, an extremely wealthy city merchant, who wishes his daughter Jenny to marry into the aristocracy. While on the plain and plump side, Jenny has been very well educated, and is exceptionally bright, capable, and practical in a way Julia never was. As it happened, Jenny had already met and been impressed by Adam during previous visits to the Oversley household and so, with full awareness by all parties, the arranged marriage is quickly accomplished. It is a simple contract; Jenny gains the title of Lady Lynton and Adam receives enough money to take care of his family obligations and save his estate. The chief difficulty is to prevent Chawleigh from being too generous.

The marriage is an awkward one, with Jenny devoted to making life as comfortable as she can for her husband, learning her duties with alacrity, while Adam buries his feelings for Julia and concentrates on launching his wife into society. Nevertheless, Julia lacks Adam's self-control and almost precipitates a scandal by fainting on coming face to face with him at one of the most exclusive social functions of the London season. It is only thanks to Jenny's initiative that gossip is averted. Drawing on her previous acquaintance with the Oversley family, she arranges to be seen driving in public on friendly terms with Julia and to hold a select dinner at Lynton House in Grosvenor Street at which the family – and even one of Julia’s many other admirers – are present.

Towards the end of the season, Jenny reveals that she is pregnant and Adam takes her to Fontley, where he begins to immerse himself in the improvement of his land. Jenny is at first hesitant to make any changes to the rather dilapidated Priory, but Adam is content to leave it in her hands, particularly as she does so out of her own funds, rather than relying on her father, as they had been obliged to do in London. The couple are now more at ease with each other, but Julia again disturbs this by visiting Fontley in the company of her parents and Lord Rockhill, her latest suitor. In particular she hints that once she is married, she would be available to Adam, a prospect he rejects not only out of loyalty to Jenny but out of personal propriety, since his late father was a known rake who kept an expensive mistress, with his wife's knowledge—something Adam had always despised.

After a row with his domineering father-in-law, Adam settles it that the expected baby will be born at Fontley, where Jenny is happy, and under the care of a doctor of their choosing. Nevertheless, he is irked by his financial dependence on Chawleigh and decides to gamble on the stock exchange at a crucial time. Having followed the news of Napoleon’s exile and return, his own past involvement in the army leads Adam to the conviction that Wellington will not lose, so instead of taking his father-in-law's advice to sell his stocks, he buys when prices are low and makes his fortune. Rather than insult Chawleigh with repayment of what he owes, however, Adam delights him by suggesting that the Lynton property titles held by Chawleigh be passed on directly to his new-born grandson.

In the excitement of so much business, Adam leaves too late to attend the engagement party of his sister Lydia being held at Fontley, but more than makes up for it by arriving with the newspapers announcing the victory at Waterloo before his guests leave next morning. The only discontented person is Julia, due to not being the centre of interest. Seeing through her shallowness, Adam makes his devoted Jenny realize how much genuine affection he feels for her now that he has outgrown his youthful dreams. While she privately tells herself that he will never feel the elevated passion for her that he did for Julia, married life is about a series of small intimate moments, and she has the better of the bargain.

== A historical genre fiction ==
Although A Civil Contract is usually bracketed among Georgette Heyer’s Regency romances, some critics have classified it with those of her social comedies that focus on other themes than exclusively romance. Jennifer Clement compares the novel to The Convenient Marriage (1934), Friday's Child (1944) and April Lady (1957) in this respect as "a reverse romance...where the central pair begin by getting married and end by realising their love for one another". The story of A Civil Contract is chiefly about class and wealth and Clement traces the ancestry of this sub-genre back to Jane Austen, a realist novelist of manners who was fully conscious of the financial demands of the upper class lifestyle. In addition, the contrasting attitudes exhibited in Austen's Sense and Sensibility are similarly to be found, for example, in Heyer's A Civil Contract, particularly in the behaviour of Julia, who uses her reputation for sensibility to get her own way, and in Jenny's, who is not so without emotion as she pretends, but by her commonsense behaviour gains admiration, acceptance and affection from others.

Finance is also a focus throughout Heyer's novel: beyond what it could buy, there is as well the theme of how money is best expended to assure future income, for instance on improving the estate from which part of one's regular income comes. Keeping a watch on investments is equally important, as well as cultivating a close relationship with one's bankers. This particular theme culminates in the depiction of the "Waterloo panic" through which Adam keeps his nerve and relies on private experience of a military kind, enabling him to recoup his fortune in the end, with the aid of a loan from Drummonds Bank.

Writing to her publisher in February 1960, Heyer announced that her next book "will be neither farcical nor adventurous, & will depend for success on whether I can make the hero as charming as I believe he was! And also, of course, if I can make a quiet story interesting." It is a story of personalities as well as a depiction of class differences. Upper-class climbing, in which the material interests of his family are neglected, in the case of the 5th Lord Lynton and his interaction with the set about the Prince Regent, compares with Jonathan Chawleigh's balancing his business acumen with his extravagant devotion to his daughter's welfare. Another conflict of interest appears in the way the self-centred Julia Oversley focusses only on her own emotional distress rather than sparing Adam's feelings, while Jenny always puts her husband’s emotional welfare before her own.

The timeline upon which the progress of the plot depends, covering the seventeen months from the end of January 1814 to June 1815, comes to its grand finale in the confused reactions and financial panic in Britain during Napoleon's invasion of Belgium, from which Adam ultimately profits. But the passing of this very specific time is also marked by gossip on social occasions in the wake of the disruptive family behaviour of the royal family, such as the Prince Regent's relationship with his estranged wife, Caroline of Brunswick, and the scandal caused by his rebellious daughter, Princess Charlotte. Equally occurring off-stage but establishing the period and having their effect on the novel's participants are the first of the Corn Law riots in London.

Other contemporary allusions in the novel are of more intimate concern to its main characters. In order to improve his run-down estate, Adam studies the farming methods of Thomas Coke and visits his experimental farm at Holkham Hall, as his grandfather, the 4th viscount, had done before him. Also consulted, to nearly disastrous effect on Jenny's behalf, was the obstetrician Sir Richard Croft, whose reducing regime for expectant mothers was currently fashionable. But another fashion of the time is put to farcical use in describing the homecoming of the honeymooning couple to Lynton House, which Mr Chawleigh, mistaking opulence for elegance, has had redecorated for them in neoclassical style and with 'Egyptian' furnishings. These include "couches with crocodile legs...lyre-backed chairs, footstools on lion-legs and several candelabra on pedestals entwined with lotus and anthemion garlands", not to mention a bath in the shape of a shell that is greeted by the normally quiet Jenny with shouts of laughter.

== Bibliography ==
- Jennifer Clement, "Loving and giving: emotional hypocrisy and generosity in A Civil Contract" in Georgette Heyer, History and Historical Fiction, UCL Press, 2021
- Jane Aiken Hodge, The Private World of Georgette Heyer , Sourcebooks 2011
- Jennifer Kloester, Georgette Heyer's Regency World, Heinemann 2005
- Jennifer Kloester, Georgette Heyer, Sourcebooks 2011
