= Golf Croquet World Championships =

The Golf Croquet World Championships is the major golf croquet championship competition organised by the World Croquet Federation. The competition has been held annually between 1996-1998 and biennially since then. A team version has been held every 4 years since 2012. Egypt has been the most successful nation in this form of croquet.

== Medallists ==
Year	Location	Gold	Silver	Bronze
1996	(Italy) Milan	Khaled Younis (EGY)	Hisham Abuosbaa (EGY)	Salah Hassan (EGY); Charles von Schmieder (IRL)
1997	(Egypt) Cairo	Salah Hassan (EGY)	Walid Salah (EGY)	Nahed Hassan (EGY); Hany Elshobaky (EGY)
1998	(England) Leamington Spa	Khaled Younis (EGY)	Mik Mehas (USA)	Evan Newell (IRL); Yasser Esmat (EGY)
2000	(Egypt) Cairo	Salah Hassan (EGY)	Khaled Younis (EGY)	Walid Salah (EGY); Stephen Mulliner (ENG)
2002	(United States) West Palm Beach, Florida	Khaled Younis (EGY)	Salah Hassan (EGY)	Walid Salah (EGY); Yasser Esmat (EGY)
2004	(England) Southwick, West Sussex	Ahmed Nasr (EGY)	Dennis Bulloch (NZL)	Mark McInerney (IRL); Khalid Younis (EGY)
2006	(New Zealand) Hastings, Hawke's Bay	Mohamed Nasr (EGY)	Salah Hassan (EGY)	Mark McInerney (IRL); Stephen Mulliner (ENG)
2008	(South Africa) Cape Town	Ahmed Nasr (EGY)	Reg Bamford (RSA)	Mohamed Nasr (EGY); Chris Clarke (ENG)
2011	(England) London	Mark McInerney (IRL)	Hisham Abuosbaa (EGY)	Ahmed Nasr (EGY); Hamish McIntosh (NZL)
2013	(Egypt) Cairo	Reg Bamford (RSA)	Ahmed Nasr (EGY)	Ahmed Elmahdy (EGY); Hamy Erian (EGY)
2015	(New Zealand) Tauranga	Ahmed Elmahdy (EGY)	Hamy Erian (EGY)	Chris Clarke (NZL); Stephen Mulliner (ENG)
2017	(Australia) Melbourne, Victoria	Reg Bamford (RSA)	Ahmed Nasr (EGY)	Felix Webby (NZL); Hamy Erian (EGY)
2019	(England) Southwick, West Sussex	Ben Rothman (USA)	Mohamed Karem (EGY)	Joshua Freeth (NZL); Hamy Erian (EGY)
2022	(England) Southwick, West Sussex	Matthew Essick (USA)	Robert Fulford (ENG)	Reg Bamford (RSA); Robert Fletcher (AUS)
2024	(United States) Chesapeake Bay, Virginia	Blake Fields (USA)	Robert Fletcher (AUS)	Euan Burridge (ENG); Khaled Kamel (EGY)
