= List of Olympic venues in discontinued events =

At the Summer Olympics, there have been eight Olympic sports that have been discontinued.

For the 2016 Summer Olympics in Rio de Janeiro, long-discontinued sports in golf (last competed in 1904) and rugby (last competed in 1924) were reinstated as Olympic sports, though rugby was as rugby sevens (having previously been rugby union).

For the 2028 Summer Olympics in Los Angeles, long-discontinued sports in cricket (only appearance in 1900) and lacrosse (last competed in 1908) will be reinstated as Olympic sports, though lacrosse will be as six-a-side (having previously been field lacrosse).

One basque pelota, one croquet, one jeu de paume, six polo, one racquets, one roque, five tug of war, and one water motorsports venues have been used at the Summer Olympics.

== Basque pelota ==

Games	Venue	Other sports hosted at venue for those games	Capacity	Ref.
1900 Paris	Neuilly-sur-Seine	None	Not listed.	

== Croquet ==

Games	Venue	Other sports hosted at venue for those games	Capacity	Ref.
1900 Paris	Bois de Boulogne	Polo, Tug of war	Not listed.	

== Jeu de paume ==

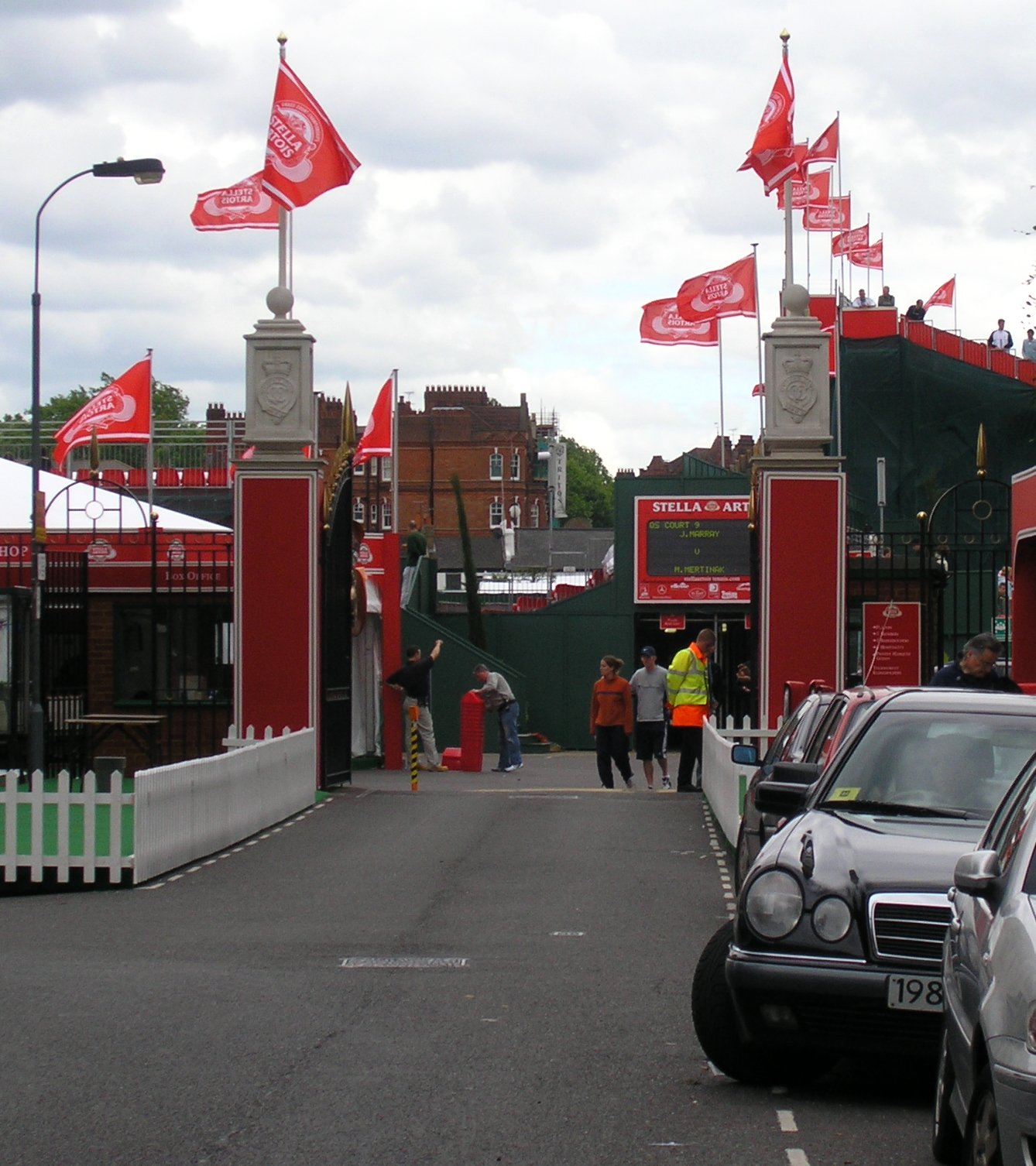
Queen's Club hosted the jeu de paume events for the 1908 Summer Olympics in London.

Games	Venue	Other sports hosted at venue for those games	Capacity	Ref.
1908 London	Queen's Club	Racquets	Not listed.	

== Polo ==

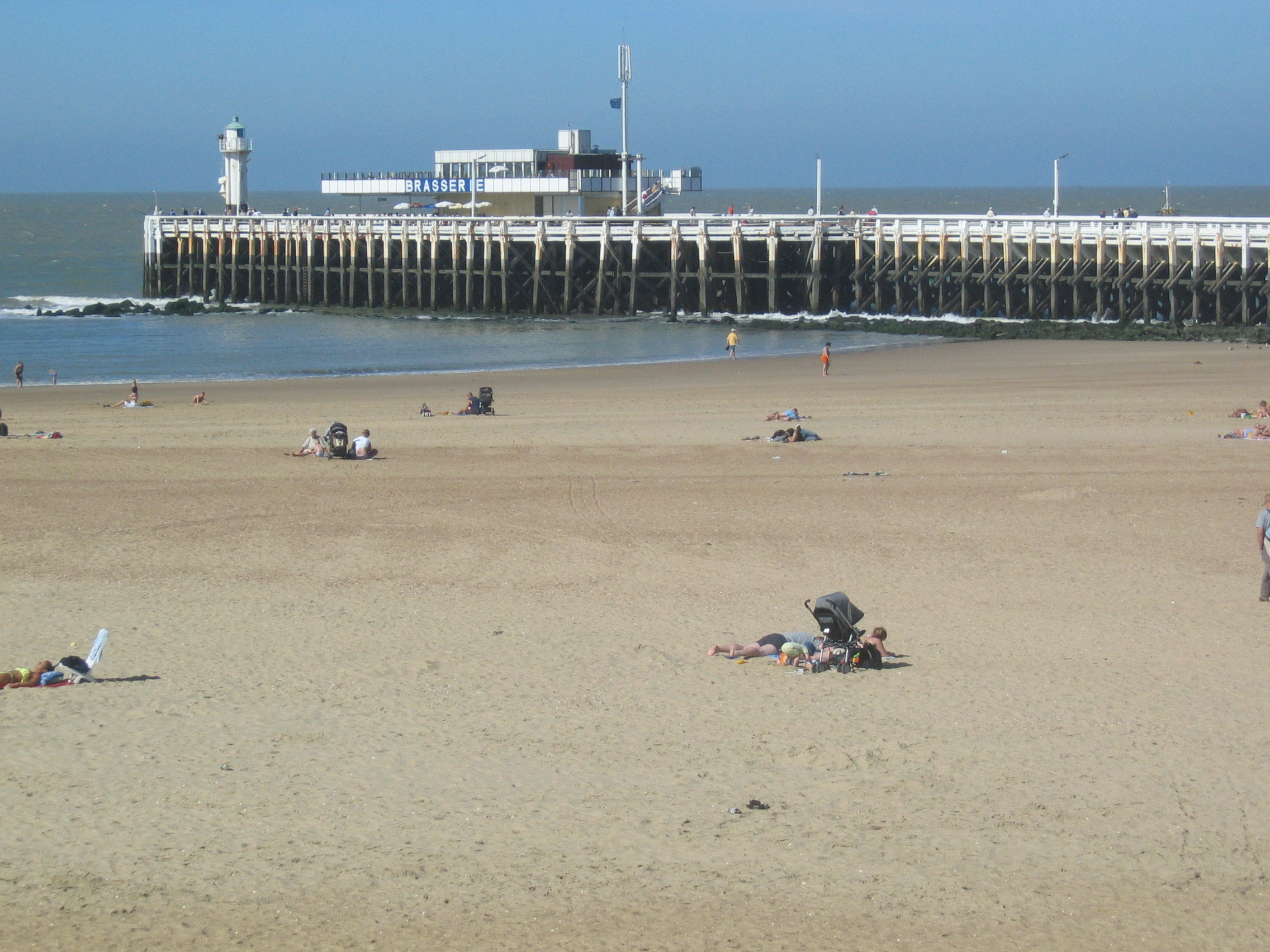
Ostend hosted the polo events for the 1920 Summer Olympics in Antwerp.

Games	Venue	Other sports hosted at venue for those games	Capacity	Ref.
1900 Paris	Bois de Boulogne	Croquet, Tug of war	Not listed.	
1908 London	Hurlingham Club	None	Not listed.	
1920 Antwerp	Ostend	Sailing	Not listed.	
1924 Paris	Bagatelle	None	598	
1924 Paris	Saint-Cloud	None	7,836	
1936 Berlin	Mayfield	Equestrian (dressage)	75,000	

== Racquets ==

Games	Venue	Other sports hosted at venues for those games	Capacity	Ref.
1908 London	Queen's Club	Jeu de paume	Not listed.	

== Roque ==

Games	Venue	Other sports hosted at venue for those games	Capacity	Ref.
1904 St. Louis	Francis Field	Archery, Athletics, Cycling, Football, Gymnastics, Lacrosse, Tennis, Tug of war, Weightlifting, and Wrestling	19,000.	

== Tug of war ==

Games	Venue	Other sports hosted at venue for those games	Capacity	Ref.
1900 Paris	Bois de Boulogne	Croquet, Polo	Not listed.	
1904 St. Louis	Francis Field	Archery, Athletics, Cycling, Football, Gymnastics, Lacrosse, Roque, Tennis, Weightlifting, and Wrestling	19,000.	
1908 London	White City Stadium	Archery, Athletics, Cycling (track), Diving, Field hockey, Football, Gymnastics, Lacrosse, Rugby union, Swimming, Water polo (final), Wrestling	97,000.	
1912 Stockholm	Stockholm Olympic Stadium	Athletics, Equestrian, Football (final), Gymnastics, Modern pentathlon (running), Wrestling	33,000.	
1920 Antwerp	Olympisch Stadion	Athletics, Equestrian, Field hockey, Football (final), Gymnastics, Modern pentathlon, Rugby union, Weightlifting	12,771	

== Water motorsports ==

Games	Venue	Other sports hosted at venue for those games	Capacity	Ref.
1908 London	Southampton Water	Sailing	Not listed.	
