= Marcel Haëntjens =

French croquet player and equestrian (1869-1915)

- Born: 24 June 1869; Saint-Corneille, Second French Empire
- Died: 10 June 1915 (aged 45); Paris, France

Marcel Marie Louis Haëntjens (24 June 1869 – 10 June 1915) was a French croquet player. He competed at the 1900 Summer Olympics in both the one ball singles and the two ball singles and did not finish in either.
