= Jeanne Filleul-Brohy =

French croquet player

- Born: 1 January 1867; Paris, Second French Empire
- Died: 20 April 1937 (aged 70); Le Loroux-Bottereau, France

Jeanne Marie Henriette Filleul-Brohy née Haëntjens, (1 January 1867 – 20 April 1937) was a French croquet player. She competed at the 1900 Summer Olympics in two events; finishing 5th in the two ball singles and not finishing in the one ball singles.
