= Ohier =

Ohier is a surname. Notable people with the surname include:

- Gustave Ohier (1814–1870), French admiral
- Marie Ohier (1853–1941), French croquet player
- Odile Ohier (born 1963), French long-distance runner
