= Marie Ohier =

French croquet player

Personal information
- Nationality: (France) French
- Born: 13 October 1853; Paris, France
- Died: 31 March 1941 (aged 87)

Sport
- Sport: Croquet

Marie Pierrette Sophie Pauline Ohier (13 October 1853 – 31 March 1941) was a French croquet player. She was born in Paris. She competed at the 1900 Summer Olympics in two events; not finishing in either the two ball singles or the one ball singles.
