= Al. Blachère =

French croquet player and Olympic competitor

Personal information
- Nationality: French

Sport
- Sport: Croquet

Achievements and titles
- Olympic finals: 1900 Summer Olympics

Al. Blachère was a French croquet player who competed at the 1900 Summer Olympics in Paris. He participated in two croquet events and finished fourth in both the one-ball singles and the two-ball singles competitions.

== Olympic career ==
Blachère represented France in croquet at the 1900 Summer Olympics, where the sport was included as part of the Olympic programme. He competed in the individual events, placing fourth in both the one-ball and two-ball singles tournaments.

The 1900 Olympic croquet competitions were notable for being among the earliest Olympic events to include competitors from France, and they remain the only Olympic Games in which croquet was officially contested.

== Personal life ==
Little biographical information about Blachère is available. His date of birth, date of death, and place of birth and death have not been recorded in major Olympic databases.
