= Louise Anne Marie Després =

French croquet player

Louise Anne Marie Després (19 September 1874 in Vervins – 21 August 1906 in Paris) was a French croquet player. She competed at the 1900 Summer Olympics and came fifth in both her events; the one ball singles and the two ball singles.
