= Georges Johin =

French croquet player

Medal record

Men's croquet

Representing France

Olympic Games
Gold medal – first place	1900 Paris	Doubles
Silver medal – second place	1900 Paris	Singles, one ball

Georges Édouard Johin (31 July 1877 in Paris – 6 December 1955 in Tessancourt-sur-Aubette) was a French croquet player and Olympic champion. He received a silver medal in Singles, one ball at the 1900 Summer Olympics in Paris.

He also received a gold medal in Doubles (with Gaston Aumoitte), as the only participants in that competition.
