= Gaston Aumoitte =

French croquet player

Medal record

Men's croquet

Representing France

Olympic Games
Gold medal – first place	1900 Paris	Singles, one ball
Gold medal – first place	1900 Paris	Doubles

Gaston Achille Louis Aumoitte (19 December 1884 in Hanoi, Tonkin Protectorate – 30 December 1957 in Sainte-Foy-la-Grande, France) was a French croquet player and Olympic champion. He received a gold medal in Singles, one ball at the 1900 Summer Olympics in Paris.

He also received a gold medal in Doubles (with Georges Johin), as the only participants in that competition.
