= William Chalfant =

American roque player

Personal information
- Born: June 22, 1854; Mount Pleasant, Ohio, United States
- Died: July 31, 1930 (aged 76); Springfield, Missouri, United States

Sport
- Sport: Roque

William Chalfant (June 22, 1854 – July 31, 1930) was an American roque player who competed in the roque tournament at the 1904 Summer Olympics.
