= Chrétien Waydelich =

French croquet player

Medal record

Men's croquet

Representing France

Olympic Games
Gold medal – first place	1900 Paris	Singles, two balls
Bronze medal – third place	1900 Paris	Singles, one ball

Chrétien André Waydelich (28 November 1841 in Strasbourg – 7 September 1917 in Paris) was a French croquet player and Olympic champion. He received a gold medal in croquet singles, two balls at the 1900 Summer Olympics in Paris beating Maurice Vignerot. He was also the bronze medalist for croquet singles, one ball according to the IOC database.
