= Smith Streeter =

American roque player

Olympic medal record

Men's Roque
Silver medal – second place	1904 St. Louis	Individual

Smith O. Streeter (July 14, 1844 – December 17, 1930) was an American roque player who competed in the 1904 Summer Olympics. He was born in Ontario, Canada. In 1904 he won the silver medal in the Olympic roque tournament.
