= Charles Brown (roque player) =

American roque player, born 1867

Olympic medal record

Men's Roque
Bronze medal – third place	1904 St. Louis	Individual

Charles Brown (March 12, 1867 – June 7, 1937) was an American roque player who competed in the 1904 Summer Olympics. In 1904 he won the bronze medal in the Olympic roque tournament.
