= Jacques Sautereau =

French croquet player

- Born: 7 September 1860; Louveciennes, Yvelines, Second French Empire
- Died: 23 November 1936 (aged 76); Saint-Mandé, Val-de-Marne, France

Olympic medal record

Croquet

Representing France
Bronze medal – third place	1900 Paris	Two ball singles

Marie Maurice Jacques Alfred Sautereau (7 September 1860 – 23 November 1936) was a French croquet player. He competed at the 1900 Summer Olympics in two events. He won a bronze medal in the two ball singles. He also competed in the one ball singles where he did not finish.
