= Maurice Vignerot =

French croquet player

Medal record

Men's croquet

Representing France

Olympic Games
Silver medal – second place	1900 Paris	Singles, two balls

Maurice Marie Joseph Vignerot (French: [mɔʁis viɲəʁo]; 25 November 1879 in Paris – 28 September 1953 in Gap, Hautes-Alpes) was a French croquet player and Olympic silver medallist. He was beaten to the gold medal by Chrétien Waydelich in Singles, two balls at the 1900 Summer Olympics in Paris. All the contestants in the competition were French. He died at Gap, Hautes-Alpes, France in 1953.
