= Charles Jacobus =

American roque player

Medal record

Men's roque

Representing the United States

Olympic Games
Gold medal – first place	1904 St. Louis	Individual

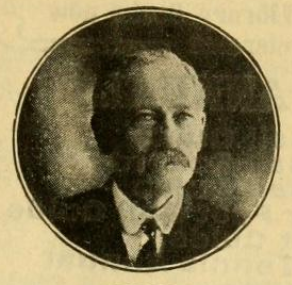
Photo of Charles Jacobus

Charles Jacobus (May 1, 1840 – November 24, 1922) was an American roque player who competed in the 1904 Summer Olympics in St. Louis. In 1904 he won the gold medal in the Olympic roque tournament.
