= Croquet at the 1900 Summer Olympics =

Croquet at the Games of the II Olympiad
- Venues: Bois de Boulogne
- Competitors: 10 from 1 nation

Croquet at the Summer Olympics
- IOC Code: CQT
- Governing body: WCF
- Events: 3 (men)

Summer Olympics
- 1896; 1900; 1904; 1908; 1912; 1920; 1924; 1928; 1932; 1936; 1948; 1952; 1956; 1960; 1964; 1968; 1972; 1976; 1980; 1984; 1988; 1992; 1996; 2000; 2004; 2008; 2012; 2016; 2020; 2024; 2028; 2032
- Medalists

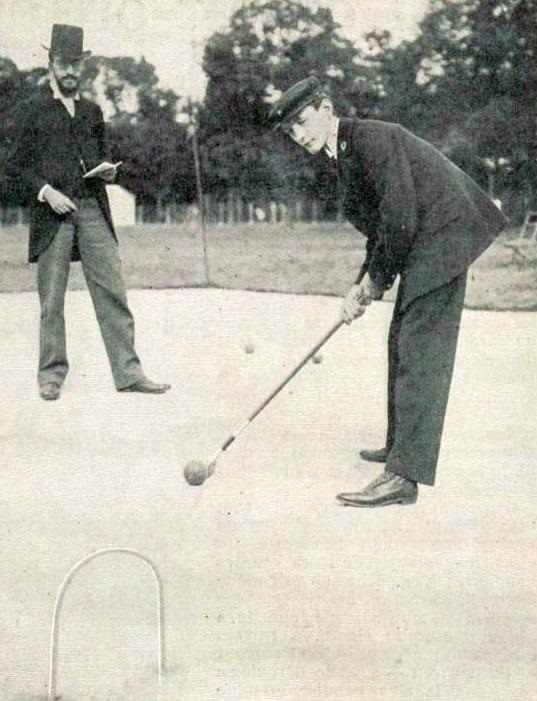
The 1900 Olympic croquet tournament

At the 1900 Summer Olympics, three croquet events were contested. Seven men and three women participated. The doubles competition was scheduled first, though it is unclear whether the French pair that won had any competition. The one-ball singles was played the next week, followed by two-ball singles the week after. France, which supplied all 10 competitors, therefore won all the medals.

This was the only Olympiad where croquet was part of the official programme, though there was the variant called roque at the 1904 Summer Olympics. All events which were restricted to amateurs, open to all nations, open to all competitors, and without handicapping, are now regarded as Olympic events (except for ballooning). Although croquet satisfied three criteria, it had been thought to have an entrant from Belgium, Marcel Haëntjens, (Haëntjens is a Flemish name) and thus have been an international competition. Haëntjens is now known to have been from France, as were the other croquet players. Only one paying spectator attended the event.

== Medal table ==
Rank	Nation	Gold	Silver	Bronze	Total
1	France	3	2	2	7
Totals (1 entries)		3	2	2	7

== Medal summary ==
Event	Gold	Silver	Bronze
Singles, one ball	Gaston Aumoitte (FRA)	Georges Johin (FRA)	Chrétien Waydelich (FRA)
Singles, two balls	Chrétien Waydelich (FRA)	Maurice Vignerot (FRA)	Jacques Sautereau (FRA)
Doubles	France Gaston Aumoitte; Georges Johin	Not known	Not known

== Participating nations ==
A total of 10 players from 1 nation competed at the Paris Games:

- France (10)

== See also ==
- List of Olympic venues in discontinued events
- Roque at the 1904 Summer Olympics
