= Chris Clarke (croquet player) =

English croquet player (born 1971)

Chris Clarke (born 1971 in Lancashire) is an English croquet player who has been ranked among the world's top players since the late 1980s. He now represents New Zealand. Chris has won two World Championships in Association Croquet, in 1995 and again in 2008, six AC World Team Champs and one GC World Team Champs. 2008 was perhaps Chris's finest year, overtaking previous world champions Robert Fulford and Reg Bamford to regain the position of world number one player, which he held for in excess of 16 months. He also reached the semi-finals of the WCF Golf Croquet World Championships in March 2008 in Cape Town, South Africa and led the English team to the finals of the 2009 European team championships.

Clarke now lives in Christchurch, New Zealand. On 30 January 2008 he was married to Jenny Clarke (née Williams), who plays for New Zealand. The pair were therefore due to be on opposing sides when Great Britain played New Zealand in the 2010 MacRobertson Shield, before Clarke withdrew with a back injury.

In October 2012, Clarke returned to competitive association croquet singles, having won multiple Open doubles titles in the meantime as well as GC singles events where he rose to world number 2. In November 2012, he completed the requisite ten matches needed to return to the world rankings, which he did in first place. Clarke switched to represent New Zealand following his controversial non-selection for England's golf croquet squad, and was a member of their victorious 2014 MacRobertson Shield team, playing at number 1 where he was the player in the event with the most wins.

In 2016, Clarke played his last International event involving singles when he captained NZ to win the GC World Championship, once again being the player with the most wins. This victory made Clarke the first player to win three of the four WCF Open World Titles. He finished his career having won 9 World titles and never having lost a major International Test Match.

== Start of career ==
Clarke started playing croquet while a 13-year-old student at Queen Elizabeth's Grammar School, Blackburn under the coaching of French teacher Andrew Bennet.

== Achievements ==
World Ranking at 1 August 2005: 2

World Ranking at 18 November 2007: 3

World Ranking at 29 July 2008: 1

World Ranking at 29 June 2009: 1

World Ranking at 20 November 2012: 1

World Ranking at 20 August 2014: 1

World Croquet Federation World Championships:

- 2008 - Winner
- 2005 - 1st Round
- 2002 - Quarter final
- 2001 - 2nd Round
- 1995 - Winner
- 1994 - Finalist
- 1992 - 1st Round
- 1991 - Semi Final
- 1990 - 1st Round
- 1989 - 4th Round

5-times President's Cup winner.

Represented Great Britain in five MacRobertson Shield competitions (captain in 1996), and New Zealand once.

Chris has won 10 British Open Doubles titles (9 with Robert Fulford).

He has won the British Opens Singles title in 1997, British Men's Championships in 2005, Sonoma-Cutrer World Croquet Championship in 1997.

=== 2006 ===
- Winner South Island Doubles (with Jenny Williams)
- Runner-up South Island Singles
- Winner New Zealand Open Doubles (with Robert Fulford)
- Winner Australian Open Doubles (with Robert Fulford)
- Winner British Men's Championships
- Winner Australian Open Singles
- Winner New Zealand Golf Croquet Open

=== 2007 ===
- Winner New Zealand Open Singles
- Winner New Zealand Open Doubles (with Jenny Williams)
- Winner South Island Doubles (with JW)
- Winner South Island Singles
- Winner Championship of Surrey
- Winner British Mixed Doubles Championships (with JW)
