= Croquet at the 1900 Summer Olympics – Doubles =

Croquet at the Olympics

Doubles croquet at the Games of the II Olympiad
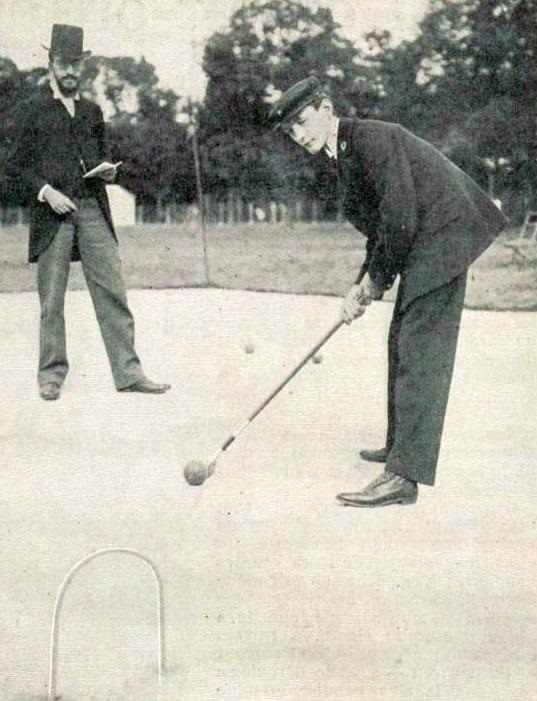
- Croquet at the 1900 Summer Olympics
- Venue: Bois de Boulogne
- Date: 22 July
- Competitors: ≥2 from ≥1 nations

Medalists
1st place, gold medalist(s)		Gaston Aumoitte and Georges Johin; France

The 1900 Olympic Croquet doubles tournament has only one double from France known. It was held on 22 July 1900. The rest of the results are unknown. Gaston Aumoitte and Georges Johin, who had taken first and second in the singles one-ball event, were the winning pair. Very little is known about the event, including the competition format.

== Background ==
This was the only appearance of the event at the Olympics; it was one of three croquet competitions in 1900. Croquet was one of the first Olympic sports open to women (with only sailing having female competitors before croquet, due to that sport taking place earlier in 1900); it is unknown whether any women competed in the doubles.

== Schedule ==
Date	Time	Round
Sunday, 22 July 1900		Final
