= Croquet at the 1900 Summer Olympics – Singles, one ball =

Croquet at the Olympics

One ball singles croquet at the Games of the II Olympiad
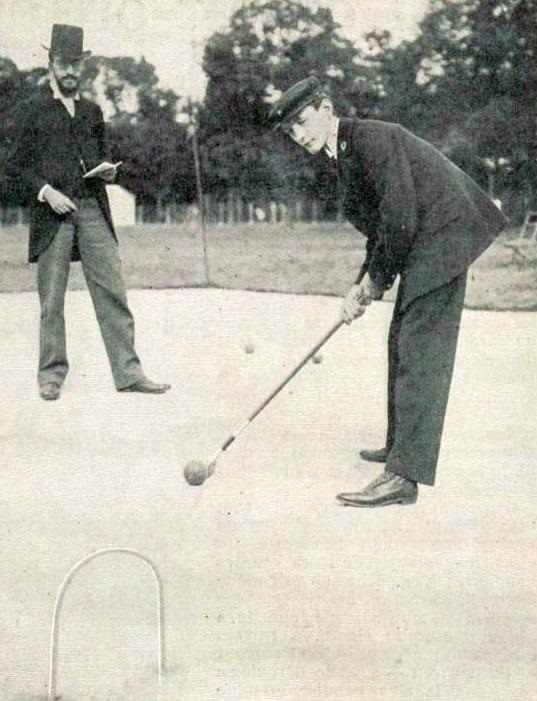
- Croquet at the 1900 Summer Olympics
- Venue: Bois de Boulogne
- Date: June 28
- Competitors: 9 from 1 nation

Medalists
1st place, gold medalist(s)		Gaston Aumoitte; France
2nd place, silver medalist(s)		Georges Johin; France
3rd place, bronze medalist(s)		Chrétien Waydelich; France

The 1900 Olympic Croquet one-ball singles tournament was held over three rounds on 28 June 1900. Nine athletes from France competed. The event was won by Gaston Aumoitte, with Georges Johin taking second and Chrétien Waydelich third.

== Background ==
This was the only appearance of the event at the Olympics; it was one of three croquet competitions in 1900.

Croquet was also one of the first Olympic sports open to women (only sailing had female competitors before croquet, due to that sport taking place earlier in 1900), with three of the nine players in this event being women.

An Englishman was the only fan who watched, having traveled from Nice to do so.

== Competition format ==
The competition was a three-round tournament. The top four players in the first round advanced to the second round; the top two in the second round moved on to the final.

== Schedule ==
Date	Time	Round
Thursday, 28 June 1900		First round Second round Final

== Results ==
=== First round ===
The first round eliminated five players, allowing four to advance. Four players, including two of the three women, did not finish the round. The third woman, Desprès, finished the round with 24 points but did not advance among the top four.

Rank	Player	Nation	Score	Notes
1	Chrétien Waydelich	France	11	Q
2	Georges Johin	France	13	Q
3	Al. Blachère	France	17	Q
4	Gaston Aumoitte	France	18	Q
5	Louise Anne Marie Després	France	24	
—	Jeanne Filleul-Brohy	France	DNF	
—	Marcel Haëntjens	France	DNF	
—	Marie Ohier	France	DNF	
—	Jacques Sautereau	France	DNF	

=== Second round ===
Waydelich and Blachère were eliminated in the second round. Waydelich, in third place, is now considered by the International Olympic Committee to be a bronze medalist.

Rank	Player	Nation	Score	Notes
1	Georges Johin	France	16	Q
2	Gaston Aumoitte	France	18	Q
3rd place, bronze medalist(s)	Chrétien Waydelich	France	20	
4	Al. Blachère	France	22	

=== Final ===
Gaston Aumoitte won the championship.

Rank	Player	Nation	Score
1st place, gold medalist(s)	Gaston Aumoitte	France	15
2nd place, silver medalist(s)	Georges Johin	France	21
