= Robert Fulford (croquet player) =

English croquet player (born 1969)

Robert Ian Fulford (born 1969) is a leading English croquet player who has dominated the sport since the turn of the 1990s.

== Life and career ==
Born in Colchester, England, he was educated at Colchester Royal Grammar School and Durham University followed by the University of Essex.

Fulford also coaches croquet, particularly in Australia and the Chattooga Club in North Carolina. Robert has made croquet videos with Australian croquet expert Kevin Brereton in which Robert teaches both basic and advanced break tactics. He has won the Association Croquet World Championship 6 times:

- 1990 at The Hurlingham Club, England
- 1992 at the International Tennis Hall of Fame, Newport, Rhode Island, USA
- 1994 at Carden Park, Cheshire, England
- 1997 at the Moorabinda Croquet Club, Bunbury, Western Australia
- 2002 in Wellington, New Zealand
- 2023 at The Hurlingham Club, England

Fulford has also won the President's Cup twelve times (1989, 1998, 1999, 2001, 2002, 2006, 2008, 2009, 2010, 2011, 2012 and 2018), the Open Championship twelve times (1991, 1992, 1996, 1998, 2003, 2004, 2006, 2007, 2008, 2014, 2015 and 2025) and the Men's Championship four times (1990, 1998, 2006, 2011).

== Career statistics ==
=== Major tournament performance timeline ===
Key
W	F	SF	QF	#R	RR	Q#	DNQ	A	NH

(W) winner; (F) finalist; (SF) semifinalist; (QF) quarterfinalist; (#R) rounds 4, 3, 2, 1; (RR) round-robin stage; (Q#) qualification round; (DNQ) did not qualify; (A) absent; (NH) not held; (SR) strike rate (events won / competed); (W–L) win–loss record.
To avoid confusion and double counting, these charts are updated at the conclusion of a tournament or when the player's participation has ended.

Tournament	1987	1988	1989	1990	1991	1992	1993	1994	1995	1996	1997	1998	1999	2000
World Championship			4R*	W	SF	W		W	F		W			
Open Championship	2R	1R	4R*	F	W	W	QF	SF	F	W	SF	W	F	SF
Men's Championship	A	QF	SF	W	A	A	A	A	A	A	SF	W	A	A
Presidents' Cup	5=	6	W	2	4=	2=	5=	A	A	A	3=	W	W	A
Win-loss	1-1	2-2	5-2	13-1	8-1	10-0	2-1	8-1	9-2	6-0	12-2	10-0	4-1	3-1

Tournament	2001	2002	2003	2004	2005	2006	2007	2008	2009	2010
World Championship	F*	W			F			SF	3R	
Open Championship	F*	A	W	W	2R	W	W	W	SF	QF
Men's Championship	F	A	F	2R	A	W	A	A	A	A
Presidents' Cup	W	W	3=	2	5=	W	4=	W	W	W
Win-Loss	8-2	5-0	8-1	5-1	5-2	9-0	5-0	8-1	4-2	2-1

Tournament	2011	2012	2013	2014	2015	2016	2017	2018	2019	2020	2021	2022	2023	2024	2025	SR	W–L	Win %
World Championship		3R	3R			A		A					W		3R	6 / 16	51–10	85
Open Championship	F	F	QF	W	W	A	F	QF	A	A	F	A	A	SF	W	12 / 33	117–21	84.8
Men's Championship	W	A	A	A	A	A	A	A	A		A	A	A	A	A	4 / 10	32–6	84.2
Presidents' Cup	W	W	6=	2	A	2	2=	W	A	2=	A	A	A	A	A	12 / 28		
Win-Loss	8-1	4-2	2-2	4-0	4-0	0-0	3-1	1-1	0-0	0-0	4-1	0-0	5-0	2-1	5-1	22 / 59	200–37	84.4

^{*} The 1989 and 2001 World and Open Championships were combined events.

The President's Cup is played as a 8/10 player round-robin and the number indicates the final position achieved.

=== Major championship finals: 42 (27 titles, 15 runners-up) ===
Outcome	Year	Championship	Opponent	Score
Runner-up	1990	NZ Championship	Joe Hogan	-26tp -17tp
Winner	1990	Men's Championship	Stephen Mulliner	+26tp +7tp -6tp +14
Runner-up	1990	Open Championship	Stephen Mulliner	-23 -24tp
Winner	1990	World Championship	Mark Saurin	+26 +24tp
Winner	1991	Open Championship	Chris Clarke	+14otp +26tp -8 +26tp
Winner	1992	World Championship	John Walters	-5tp +4tp +12tp
Winner	1992	Open Championship	Stephen Mulliner	+26tp -14otp +14 -12tpo +26tp
Winner	1993	NZ Championship	Bob Jackson	+21tp +12
Winner	1994	Australian Championship	Rohan Carter	+24tp +3
Winner	1994	World Championship	Chris Clarke	-12tpo +12tp +18tp +13
Runner-up	1995	NZ Championship	Bob Jackson	-26 -26
Runner-up	1995	World Championship	Chris Clarke	-18tp +12tpo -26tp +26tp -26
Runner-up	1995	Open Championship	Reg Bamford	-24tp -26tp +26tp +26tp -26tp
Winner	1996	Open Championship	Aaron Westerby	+24tp -26tp +26tp -13tpo +26tp
Winner	1997	World Championship	Stephen Mulliner	+17 -3tpo +9otp +11otp
Winner	1990	Men's Championship	Phil Cordingley	+4 +14tp +24
Winner	1998	Open Championship	Jacques Fournier	+26tp +22tp +25tp +26tp
Runner-up	1999	Open Championship	Reg Bamford	-26tp +26tp +26tp -26tp -26tp
Winner	2000	NZ Championship	Chris Clarke	+26tp +26tp
Runner-up	2001	Men's Championship	Reg Bamford	-3 +8tp -8 +20tp -17qnp
Runner-up	2001	World Championship	Reg Bamford	+16tp -17sxp +2 -26sxp -26qp
Winner	2002	World Championship	Toby Garrison	+26tp +26tp -17tp +15tp
Runner-up	2003	Men's Championship	Pete Trimmer	-16tp -18tp -26tp
Winner	2003	Open Championship	Reg Bamford	+26tp +12 +18tp
Winner	2004	Open Championship	Pete Trimmer	+26tp -26tp -18tp +16 +26tp
Winner	2005	NZ Championship	Ronan McInerney	+26tp +26
Runner-up	2005	World Championship	Reg Bamford	-17tp -26sxp -17sxp
Winner	2006	NZ Championship	Paul Skinley	+26sxp +25sxp +26tp
Winner	2006	Men's Championship	Jack Wicks	+26tp +26tp +26tp
Winner	2006	Open Championship	Reg Bamford	-2qp +25sxp +26qnp -8sxp +1
Winner	2007	Open Championship	Reg Bamford	+26tp +25sxp -16tp +26sxp
Runner-up	2008	NZ Championship	Rutger Beijderwellen	-26qp -17tp +26 -26tp
Winner	2008	Open Championship	Samir Patel	+16qp +17 +26tp
Winner	2011	Men's Championship	Paddy Chapman	-25tp +20tp +26tp +4
Runner-up	2011	Open Championship	Reg Bamford	+18tp -26sxp -17 -26sxp
Runner-up	2012	Open Championship	Reg Bamford	-25sxp +14tp -24sxp -24sxp
Winner	2014	Open Championship	Reg Bamford	+16 +5qp +18qp
Winner	2015	Open Championship	Paddy Chapman	+20 +7
Runner-up	2017	Open Championship	Reg Bamford	+25sxp, +3, -20sxp, -26sxp, -19sxp
Runner-up	2021	Open Championship	Reg Bamford	+3sxp, -25sxp, -24sxp, -19sxp
Winner	2023	World Championship	Matthew Essick	-17tp, -17tp, +4tp, +26tp, +8otp
Winner	2025	Open Championship	Jenny Clarke	+19tp, +7

== Style ==
Fulford's playing style includes the ability to play a range of shots. His tactic of peeling an opponent's ball through hoop 1 makes a triple peel as hard as possible for the opponent. His sextuple peels are also more frequent than those of any other player. Robert Fulford uses an Irish grip [rather like a golf grip] and employs "casting" [swinging mallet over the ball] about three times before each shot. He has strong wrists which makes the Irish grip work for him without it causing the R.S.I. that the grip is sometimes blamed for. In fact, Robert admits that he has quite a wrist-dominated technique which contradicts most coaching manuals that advise minimal wrist involvement.

== World Championship results ==
Fulford has played in the following AC World Championships:

- 1989: Round 4: (lost to John Prince +26tp, -17, -26tp)
- 1990: won (beat Mark Saurin +26, +24tp)
- 1991: S/F (lost to John Walters -14otp, -26tp)
- 1992: won (beat John Walters -5tp, +4tp, +12tp)
- 1994: won (beat Chris Clarke -12tpo, +12tp, +18tp, +13)
- 1995: runner-up (lost to Chris Clarke -18tp, +12tpo, -26tp, +26tp, -26)
- 1997: won (beat Stephen Mulliner +17, -3tpo, +9otp, +11otp)
- 2001: runner-up (lost to Reg Bamford +16tp, -17sxp, +3, -26sxp, -26qp)
- 2002: won (beat Toby Garrison +26tp, +26tp, -17tp, +15tp)
- 2005: runner-up (lost to Reg Bamford -17tp, -26sxp, -17sxp)
- 2008: S/F (lost to Chris Clarke +26tp, +26tp, -11tpo, -17, -26)
- 2009: Round 3: (lost to Ben Rothman -14, -15tp, -17)
- 2012: Round 3: (lost to Marcus Evans +26tp, -20tp, +26sxp, -3tp, -25qnp)
- 2013: Round 3: (lost to Andrew Johnston +17tp, +12tp, -26, -15, -15)
- 2023: won (beat Matthew Essick -17tp, -17tp, +4tp, +26tp, +8otp)
- 2025: Round 3: (lost to Ben Rothman -25tp, -25tp, +8, -17tp)
