= World Croquet Federation =

World governing body for croquet

- Sport: Croquet
- Jurisdiction: International
- Abbreviation: WCF
- Founded: 1986
- President: Jose Alvarez-Sala
- Secretary: Rosemary Landrebe

Official website
- worldcroquet.org

The World Croquet Federation (WCF) is the world governing body for croquet. Its primary objective is to make the various codes of the game "well-known, well-understood, well-respected and well-supported sports in countries throughout the world". To that end, it encourages, promotes and develops Golf Croquet and Association Croquet internationally at all levels. The WCF sanctions various croquet tournaments for both individuals and national teams, held worldwide, maintains world rankings for individuals and nations, and governs changes to the laws of Association Croquet and the rules of Golf Croquet.

The WCF was first formed in 1986 as a committee spearheaded by members of the English Croquet Association, with the intention of holding a World Championship. The first General Meeting was held alongside the first World Championship in July 1989. At the outset, Australia, England, Ireland, Japan, New Zealand, Scotland, and the USA were Full Members, with Canada, France, Italy, Jersey, and South Africa as Observer Members.

== Member Countries ==
Croquet-playing Nations must satisfy strict criteria prior to membership being accepted by the WCF.

=== Full Members ===
- Australia
- Canada
- Egypt
- England
- Germany
- Ireland
- New Zealand
- Scotland
- South Africa
- Spain
- Sweden
- United States
- Wales

=== Associate Members ===
- Czech Republic
- Latvia
- Mexico
- Norway
- Portugal
- Switzerland

=== Recognised Croquet Organisations ===
- Austria
- Belgium
- Corfu
- Finland
- Hong Kong
- India
- Iran
- Japan
- Jersey
- Mauritius
- Netherlands
- Uruguay

== World Champions (Singles) ==
=== Association Croquet ===
| Year | Winner | Runner up | Bronze Medals | Venue |
|---|---|---|---|---|
| 1989 | (New Zealand) Joe Hogan | (England) Mark Avery | (Republic of Ireland) Colin Irwin, (England) David Openshaw | (England) The Hurlingham Club, London |
| 1990 | (England) Robert Fulford | (England) Mark Saurin | (England) Stephen Mulliner, (United States) Jerry Stark | (England) The Hurlingham Club, London |
| 1991 | (England) John Walters | (England) David Openshaw | (England) Chris Clarke, (England) Robert Fulford | (England) The Hurlingham Club, London |
| 1992 | (England) Robert Fulford | (England) John Walters | (New Zealand) Bob Jackson, (England) David Openshaw | (United States) Newport, Rhode Island |
| 1994 | (England) Robert Fulford | (England) Chris Clarke | (England) Steve Comish, (New Zealand) Aaron Westerby | (England) Carden, Cheshire |
| 1995 | (England) Chris Clarke | (England) Robert Fulford | (Wales) Ian Burridge, (England) Stephen Mulliner | (France) Fontenay-le-Comte, Pays de la Loire |
| 1997 | (England) Robert Fulford | (England) Stephen Mulliner | (New Zealand) Shane Davis, (England) David Maugham | Bunbury, Western Australia |
| 2001 | (South Africa) Reg Bamford | (England) Robert Fulford | (New Zealand) Dennis Bulloch, (United States) Jacques Fournier | (England) The Hurlingham Club, London |
| 2002 | (England) Robert Fulford | (New Zealand) Toby Garrison | (Republic of Ireland) Andrew Johnston, (New Zealand) Brian Wislang | (New Zealand) Wellington |
| 2005 | (South Africa) Reg Bamford | (England) Robert Fulford | (England) James Death, (Scotland) Jonathan Kirby | (England) Cheltenham, Gloucestershire |
| 2008 | (England) Chris Clarke | (England) Stephen Mulliner | (England) Robert Fulford, (New Zealand) Aaron Westerby | (New Zealand) Christchurch, Canterbury |
| 2009 | (South Africa) Reg Bamford | (United States) Ben Rothman | (England) Chris Farthing, (Australia) Robert Fletcher | (United States) West Palm Beach, Florida |
| 2012 | (South Africa) Reg Bamford | (Australia) Robert Fletcher | (England) Marcus Evans, (Australia) Simon Hockey | Adelaide, South Australia |
| 2013 | (Australia) Robert Fletcher | (New Zealand) Paddy Chapman | (South Africa) Reg Bamford, (Republic of Ireland) Andrew Johnston | (England) London |
| 2016 | (England) Stephen Mulliner | (United States) David Maloof | (South Africa) Reg Bamford, (England) David Maugham | (United States) West Palm Beach, Florida |
| 2018 | (New Zealand) Paddy Chapman | (South Africa) Reg Bamford | (England) Stephen Mulliner, (Spain) Jose Riva | (New Zealand) Wellington |
| 2020 | (South Africa) Reg Bamford | (United States) Matthew Essick | (Australia) Robert Fletcher, (Australia) Edward Wilson | (Australia) Melbourne, Victoria |
| 2023 | (England) Robert Fulford | (United States) Matthew Essick | (United States) Thomas Balding, (Australia) Robert Fletcher, | (England) London |
| 2025 | (South Africa) Reg Bamford | (England) Mark Avery | (Australia) Robert Fletcher, (New Zealand) Logan McCorkindale | (United States) West Palm Beach, Florida |

=== Women's Association Croquet ===
| Year | Winner | Runner up | Bronze Medals | Venue |
|---|---|---|---|---|
| 2012 | (New Zealand) Jenny Clarke | (Australia) Alison Sharpe | (Australia) Chloe Aberley, (Australia) Rosemary Landrebe | (Australia) Cairnlea, Victoria |
| 2015 | (England) Miranda Chapman | (England) Gabrielle Higgins | (New Zealand) Jenny Clarke, (Australia) Alison Sharpe | (England) Nottingham, Nottinghamshire |
| 2023 | (England) Debbie Lines | (England) Gabrielle Higgins | (New Zealand) Jenny Clarke, (Australia) Alison Sharpe | (New Zealand) Christchurch, Canterbury |

=== Golf Croquet ===
| Year | Winner | Runner up | Bronze Medals | Venue |
|---|---|---|---|---|
| 1996 | (Egypt) Khalid Younis | (Egypt) Hisham Abousbaa | (Egypt) Salah Hassan, (Republic of Ireland) Charlie von Schmieder | Milan, Italy |
| 1997 | (Egypt) Salah Hassan | (Egypt) Walid Salah | (Egypt) Nahed Hassan, (Egypt) Hani El-Shobaki | Cairo, Egypt |
| 1998 | (Egypt) Khalid Younis | (United States) Mik Mehas | (Egypt) Yasser Esmat, (Republic of Ireland) Evan Newell | Leamington Spa, England |
| 2000 | (Egypt) Salah Hassan | (Egypt) Yasser Esmat | (England) Stephen Mulliner, (Egypt) Walid Salah | Cairo, Egypt |
| 2002 | (Egypt) Khalid Younis | (Egypt) Salah Hassan | (Egypt) Yasser Esmat, (Egypt) Walid Salah | West Palm Beach, USA |
| 2004 | (Egypt) Ahmed Nasr | (New Zealand) Dennis Bulloch | (South Africa) Reg Bamford, (Republic of Ireland) Mark McInerney | Southwick, England |
| 2006 | (Egypt) Mohammed Nasr | (Egypt) Salah Hassan | (Republic of Ireland) Mark McInerney, (England) Stephen Mulliner | Hawkes Bay, New Zealand |
| 2008 | (Egypt) Ahmed Nasr | (South Africa) Reg Bamford | (England) Chris Clarke, (Egypt) Mohammed Nasr | Cape Town, South Africa |
| 2011 | (Republic of Ireland) Mark McInerney | (Egypt) Hisham Abousbaa | (Egypt) Ahmed Nasr, (New Zealand) Hamish McIntosh | Hurlingham, London, England |
| 2013 | (South Africa) Reg Bamford | (Egypt) Ahmed Nasr | (Egypt) Ahmed El Mahdi, (Egypt) Hami Erian | Cairo, Egypt |
| 2015 | (Egypt) Ahmed El Mahdi | (Egypt) Hami Erian | (New Zealand) Chris Clarke, (England) Stephen Mulliner | Bay of Plenty, New Zealand |
| 2017 | (South Africa) Reg Bamford | (Egypt) Ahmed Nasr | (Egypt) Hami Erian, (New Zealand) Felix Webby | Melbourne, Australia |
| 2019 | (United States) Ben Rothman | (Egypt) Mohamed Karem | (Egypt) Hami Erian, (New Zealand) Josh Freeth | Southwick, England |
| 2022 | (United States) Matthew Essick | (England) Robert Fulford | (South Africa) Reg Bamford, (Australia) Robert Fletcher | Southwick, England |
| 2024 | (United States) Blake Fields | (Australia) Robert Fletcher | (England) Euan Burridge, (Egypt) Khaled Kamel | Chesapeake Bay, USA |

=== Women's Golf Croquet ===
| Year | Winner | Runner up | Bronze Medals | Venue |
|---|---|---|---|---|
| 2005 | (Egypt) Nahed Hassan | (Egypt) Iman El Faransawy | (Egypt) Shereen Hamdy, (Egypt) Abeer Mostafa | Cairo, Egypt |
| 2007 | (Egypt) Iman El Faransawy | (Egypt) Marwa Mostafa | (Egypt) Hemat Mostafa, (New Zealand) Jenny Williams | Dublin, Ireland |
| 2009 | (Australia) Alix Verge | (Egypt) Iman El Faransawy | (New Zealand) Jenny Clarke, (Egypt) Shaden Okasha | Cairnlea, Victoria, Australia |
| 2011 | (England) Rachel Rowe | (New Zealand) Jenny Clarke | (Australia) Rosemary Graham, (Egypt) Marwa Mostafa | Bay of Plenty, New Zealand |
| 2014 | (South Africa) Judith Hanekom | (New Zealand) Jenny Clarke | (Egypt) Mona Hegazy, (Egypt) Abeer Mostafa | Cairo, Egypt |
| 2019 | (Egypt) Soha Mostafa | (Egypt) Manal Khoudeir | (New Zealand) Jenny Clarke, (Egypt) Iman El Faransawy | Hawkes Bay, New Zealand |
| 2023 | (Australia) Jamie Gumbrell | (England) Rachel Gee | (Egypt) Soha Mostafa, (Egypt) Maram Nabil | Southwick, England |

== World Champions (Teams) ==
=== Association Croquet ===
Tier 1 (MacRobertson Shield)
| Year | Winner | Runner up | Venue |
|---|---|---|---|
| 2010 | (United Kingdom) Great Britain | New Zealand | Various, England |
| 2014 | New Zealand | England | Various, New Zealand |
| 2017 | Australia | England | Mission Hills, California, USA |
| 2022 | England | Australia | Melbourne, Australia |
| 2026 | England | New Zealand | Various, England |

Tier 2.1
| Year | Winner | Runner up | Venue |
|---|---|---|---|
| 2010 | Wales | South Africa | Hurlingham, England |
| 2014 | (Republic of Ireland) Ireland | Wales | Carrickmines, Ireland |
| 2017 | Wales | Scotland | Sussex, England |
| 2022 | Scotland | Wales | Budleigh Salterton, England |
| 2026 | Wales | (Republic of Ireland) Ireland | Nottingham, England |

Tier 2.2
| Year | Winner | Runner up | Venue |
|---|---|---|---|
| 2010 | Scotland | Canada, Spain | Eastbourne, England |
| 2014 | Spain | Austria | Sussex, England |
| 2017 | Sweden | Canada | Sussex, England |
| 2022 | Canada | Austria | Budleigh Salterton, England |
| 2026 | Sweden | (Czech Republic) Czechia | Nottingham, England |

Tier 3
| Year | Winner | Runner up | Venue |
|---|---|---|---|
| 2010 | Czech Republic | Sweden | Eastbourne, England |
| 2014 | Austria | Germany | Sussex, England |
| 2017 | Germany | Czech Republic | Sussex, England |
| 2022 | South Africa | Germany | Budleigh Salterton, England |
| 2026 | Germany | Latvia | Nottingham, England |

=== Golf Croquet ===
Tier 1
| Year | Winner | Runner up | Venue |
|---|---|---|---|
| 2012 | Egypt | New Zealand | Johannesburg, South Africa |
| 2016 | New Zealand | Egypt | Surbiton, England |
| 2020 | New Zealand | Egypt | Nelson, New Zealand |
| 2025 | (United States) USA | Egypt | Launceston, Tasmania, Australia |

Tier 2
| Year | Winner | Runner up | Venue |
|---|---|---|---|
| 2012 | Wales | Belgium | Cairo, Egypt |
| 2016 | Australia | Spain | Bath, England |
| 2021 | Spain | Wales | Cadiz, Spain |
| 2025 | Sweden | Canada | Southwick, England |

Tier 3
| Year | Winner | Runner up | Venue |
|---|---|---|---|
| 2016 | Norway | Russia | Godalming, England |
| 2022 | Mexico | Portugal | Godalming, England |
| 2025 | Scotland | Germany | Southwick, England |

=== National Associations ===
- Australian Croquet Association
- Croquet Canada
- Egyptian Croquet Federation
- Croquet Association
- Croquet Association of Ireland
- Croquet New Zealand
- Scottish Croquet Association
- South African Croquet Association
- Federación Española de Croquet
- United States Croquet Association
- Austrian Croquet Federation
- Asociace Českomoravského Kroketu
- Deutscher Krocket Bund
- Federazione Italiana Sport Croquet
- Croquet Association of Japan
- Latvijas kroketa federācija
- Norges Croquet Forbund
- Svenska krocketförbundet
- Association Suisse de Croquet
- Welsh Croquet Association
- Croquet Federation of Belgium
- Suomen Krokettiliitto
- Croquet Federation of India
- Jersey Croquet Club
