= Ben Rothman =

American croquet player

Ben Rothman is, as of May 2012, the number one ranked Association croquet player in North America. After focusing his life towards the game in 2007, he has become a notable player in competitions around the world. Rothman has won many high-profile croquet tournaments and competed in such major competitions as many USCA National Championships, the WCF World Championships, the MacRobertson Shield, and the Solomon Trophy.

== Early life ==
Benjamin Hunter Rothman (aka Brothman) was born on November 9, 1983, in Berkeley, California. While visiting family in Maine over the summers during his childhood, he learned to play croquet from a cousin, Larry Stettner. Rothman began playing nine-wicket croquet, entering his first tournament in 1995, the Claremont Classic. By 1996 he was playing American six-wicket croquet. Association croquet and golf croquet tournaments soon followed.

Following high school, Rothman graduated from the University of California, San Diego, in 2006 with a bachelor's degree in psychology. During his time at UCSD he remained a competitive sportsman through his active participation in ultimate frisbee. After graduation, Rothman soon turned to croquet full-time.

== Professional life ==
Ben has been described as a "croquet nomad" due to his extensive travelling, and competitive croquet lifestyle. Currently Rothman spends his winters in Rancho Mirage, California, at the Mission Hills Country Club where he is the resident croquet professional for the Mission Hills Croquet Club. The 2011/2012 season marks his third year at Mission Hills and under his tutelage, the Mission Hills Croquet Club has won the USCA "Club of the Year" twice in a row (2010 and 2011). Here Ben directs regional, national, and club tournaments, as well as instructs groups and individuals for clinics and private lessons. The summer months he spends traveling the world, playing tournaments as well as directing clinics and tournaments across the United States.

== Serious play ==
Rothman began touring across North America in 2007 and less than a year later, in 2008, was touring internationally. He is a top competitor in any tournament he enters and has numerous wins under his belt. In 2009 and again in 2010, he was #1 in the US Croquet Association's annual Grand Prix and was awarded "Player of the Year" by the USCA. Rothman became the first player to finish at the top of the Grand Prix standings two years in a row since the Grand Prix was reinstituted in 1999 when he finished the 2010 season with a record 35,150 points. In international tournaments Ben has made a strong showing as well. In 2009 he was a finalist in the WCF World Championships, where Reg Bamford took the title. This was the best showing to date of an American in the history of the tournament.

Due to his outstanding track record and professionalism Ben has been chosen to represent the United States in many international events and test matches. He was a member of the USA team during the 2008, 2010 and 2011 Solomon Trophy, helping the US team rise to victory in the year 2010 on American soil (this was the first time the US had won this prestigious honor since the inception of the Solomon Trophy), then again in 2011 on English soil, as well as being the US team captain for the 2011 Carter Challenge against the Irish.

=== Notable wins ===
- 2008 North American Open Champion
- 2009 National Singles and Doubles Champion
- 2009 Selection Eights Champion
- 2009 U.S. Open Champion
- 2010 North American Open Champion
- 2010 American Rules National Champion, and Doubles Champion with Brian Cumming
- 2010 Golf Croquet National Champion, and Doubles T-3rd
- 2011 North American Open Champion
- 2012 USCA AC National Doubles Champion with Doug Grimsley

=== Other wins ===
- 2007 Big Lobster Tournament Champion
- 2008 Palm Beach Invite Tournament Champion
- 2008 Mission Hills Invite Tournament Champion
- 2008 Arizona Open Tournament Champion
- 2008 Peachwood Classic Champion
- 2008 Berkshires Invite Champion
- 2008 North East Regionals Champion, and Doubles Champion
- 2009 Desert Classic Champion
- 2009 Arizona Open Tournament Champion
- 2009 Peachwood Classic Champion
- 2009 Berkshires Invite Champion
- 2009 Aboyne Open Champion
- 2009 Claremont Doubles Champion
- 2009 Merion Invitational Singles and Doubles Champion
- 2009 Osborn Cup Singles and Doubles Champion
- 2010 Desert Classic Champion
- 2010 Peachwood Classic Champion
- 2010 Rocky Mountain International Open Champion
- 2010 North Carolina Open Champion
- 2010 Greenwich Invitational Champion
- 2010 Merion Invitational Association Laws Champion
- 2010 Winner of Kamal v. Rothman: Pasadena Play-Off GC Exhibition
- 2011 Desert Classic Champion
- 2011 Mission Hills Invitational Champion, and Doubles Champion with Larry Stettner
- 2011 Arizona Closed Champion
- 2011 USCA Western Regional Champion
- 2011 IPC International Weekend Croquet Champion
- 2011 British Open Consolation Doubles Winner with Brian Cumming
- 2012 Desert Classic Champion
