= The Croquet Player =

1936 novella by H.G. Wells

- First edition (UK)
- Author: H. G. Wells
- Illustrator: Clifton Line
- Language: English
- Publisher: Chatto and Windus (UK); Viking Press (US)
- Publication date: 1936 (UK); 1937 (US)
- Publication place: United Kingdom
- Pages: 98
- Preceded by: The Anatomy of Frustration
- Followed by: Star Begotten

The Croquet Player is a 1936 novella by H. G. Wells, "a sort of ghost story." It has been called "a short allegory written under the stimulus of the Spanish War."

== Plot summary ==
Georgie, a gentleman with "soft hands and an ineffective will," is dependent on his wealthy aunt, Miss Frobisher. He is "refreshingly unimaginative." Croquet is his and his aunt's "especial gift," and he and his aunt play often as they "move about a lot." While relaxing one summer day on a terrace at Les Noupets in Normandy, Georgie strikes up a conversation with an English doctor named Dr. Finchatton, who tells him his life story.

Finchatton has purchased a medical practice in a quiet English district called Cainsmarsh, but this location turns out to be less tranquil than he had hoped. He slowly becomes persuaded that some malign influence is warping life in Cainsmarsh. He consults an old vicar, who tells him that there is indeed "something evil" at work there. The vicar attributes this to the "grisly ghosts" of "a tribe of cave men" whose graves have been disturbed by "local archaeologists and naturalists."

Troubled by this, Finchatton visits the curator of the local museum. The latter shows him some Neanderthal remains that are the museum's "prize specimen" and Finchatton learns that such creatures "had slouched and snarled over the marshes for a hundred times the length of recorded history." The curator explains that Finchatton's disturbed state is due to humanity's "breaking the frame of our present" by being forced out of the "magic sphere" where "we felt taken care of and safe." The only solution is to "broaden your mind to the new scale."

The curator recommends a psychiatrist named Norbert in London "if you still find you are slipping." Finchatton is pushed to this point by discovering a dog beaten to a pulp and then learning that the old vicar has tried to kill his wife. Norbert's cure involves Finchatton telling his story to "reasonably balanced" people so as to return to "a rational insensitiveness."

To Georgie's dismay, at this point Norbert himself appears. When Georgie keeps a rendez-vous with him the next day, he learns from Norbert that Finchatton is mad, and that his story is in many respects the invention of his diseased mind. Norbert, too, is "infected" with the fear of ancestral ghosts, or rather fear of influence from "the cave man" in us who "has never died. . . . There has been no real change, no real escape. Civilization, progress, all that, we are discovering, was a delusion." Georgie flees the gesticulations and shouting of this dire prophet, but finds has nevertheless been "in a sort of way hypnotized" by these two men. The croquet player has written this narrative in an attempt to "try and get them in a proper perspective."

== Reception ==
Dave Langford reviewed The Croquet Player for White Dwarf #60, and stated that "It's evocation of nameless evil haunting English marshland is better than anything Lovecraft could do; but the horror relates to pre-historic savageries of our ancestors, a haunting [...] from deep inside our own minds. As civilization totters, the blood-spattered caveman begins to re-emerge. Read this; remember what happened soon after its publication; look around you today; and allow yourself a shudder."

The Croquet Player was serialized in the London Evening Standard and was "fairly widely read"; J.B. Priestley praised it and compared it to Thomas Mann's 1929 novella Mario and the Magician.
