= Roque at the 1904 Summer Olympics =

Men's singles roque at the Games of the III Olympiad
- Dates: August 3, 1904– August 8, 1904
- Competitors: 4 from 1 nation

Medalists
1st place, gold medalist(s)		Charles Jacobus	United States
2nd place, silver medalist(s)		Smith Streeter	United States
3rd place, bronze medalist(s)		Charles Brown	United States

At the 1904 Summer Olympics in St. Louis, a roque tournament was contested. It was the only time that roque was included in the Olympic program.

== Participating nations ==
4 players from the host nation competed.

- United States (4)

== Results ==
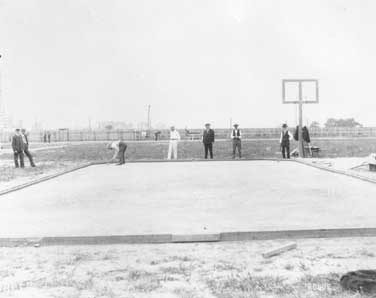
The roque competition in 1904

The competitors played a double round-robin tournament, with each player playing their opponents twice.

Rank	Player	Won	Lost
1	Charles Jacobus (USA)	5	1
2	Smith Streeter (USA)	4	2
3	Charles Brown (USA)	2	4
4	William Chalfant (USA)	1	5

Source: Sports Reference.

== Medal table ==
Gold	Silver	Bronze
United States	United States	United States

== See also ==
- Croquet at the 1900 Summer Olympics
- List of Olympic venues in discontinued events
