= Stephen Mulliner =

English croquet player

Stephen Mulliner (born 4 September 1953) is an English international croquet player, who has won championships in both major disciplines, Association Croquet (AC) and Golf Croquet (GC). He won the British AC Open Championship in 1988, 1990, and 2000; the British GC Open Championship in 2000, 2001, 2010, 2011, 2012, 2013, 2016 and 2020; the European GC Championship in 2007, 2009, 2013, 2015 and 2019; and the World AC Championship in 2016.

In the 2016 World AC Championships held at the National Croquet Center, West Palm Beach in Florida, he defeated Christian Carter, Stephen Forster, Danny Huneycutt, and Reg Bamford before reaching the final. Bamford, having won the World Championship on four previous occasions, was a favourite to win and took the first two games in the best-of-five match decisively, but Mulliner scraped through in the third game, took the fourth with a sextuple peel that nearly went badly wrong, and then took the fifth game with convincing form.

In the final match against David Maloof (USA), Mulliner again went 2-0 down, but scraped a victory in the third game to remain in the match and then played solidly to take the last two games. The five games were played over 11½ hours in a single day. The victory made Mulliner the oldest world champion at 62 (he had reached the final on two previous occasions, in 1997 and 2008).

Mulliner has also been active in management of the sport, serving as Vice-President of the Croquet Association, President of the European Croquet Federation, and Secretary-General of the World Croquet Federation.

Outside the world of croquet, Mulliner had a City career and is now a management consultant and a Conservative local councillor. He is married to Sarah and they have four children. He lives in Haslemere, Surrey.
