= Reginald Bamford =

South African croquet player (born 1967)

Reg Bamford (born 11 October 1967 in Cape Town, South Africa) is a croquet world champion from London, England. Although resident in England, he plays croquet for his native South Africa.

Since 2001, he has dominated world croquet. He is the only player to have won both versions of the World Championships (Golf Croquet and Association Croquet) and held both titles simultaneously in 2013. He has won the Association Croquet World Croquet Championship six times (2001, 2005, 2009, 2012, 2020 and 2025), and the WCF World Golf Croquet Championship twice (2013 and 2017). He was runner-up on two occasions (2018 in AC and 2012 in GC) and semi-finalist on two occasions (2014 and 2016 in AC). He has won the British AC Open Championship 12 times and the British GC Open Championship 12 times, the premier events in the UK of each code.

Furthermore, he was ranked 29th in the 100 Best Sportspeople in the World for the year 2020 by Sports Media. He enjoys a rivalry with Robert Fulford, whom he has faced in eleven British AC Open singles finals.

He is a businessman and qualified Chartered Accountant (after completing his articles at Deloitte SA in 1992), who founded and runs Sable International, a company that offer services to expats and high-net-worth individuals. He is known throughout the Antipodean and South African communities in London. He has two sons and is married to Adrienne.

== Career statistics (Association Croquet) ==
=== Major tournament performance timeline ===
Key
W	F	SF	QF	#R	RR	Q#	DNQ	A	NH

(W) winner; (F) finalist; (SF) semifinalist; (QF) quarterfinalist; (#R) rounds 4, 3, 2, 1; (RR) round-robin stage; (Q#) qualification round; (DNQ) did not qualify; (A) absent; (NH) not held; (SR) strike rate (events won / competed); (W–L) win–loss record.
To avoid confusion and double counting, these charts are updated at the conclusion of a tournament or when the player's participation has ended.

Tournament	1984	1987	1988	1989	1990	1991	1992	1993	1994	1995	1996	1997	1998	1999
World Championship				A	A	QF	1R		QF	2R		QF		
Open Championship	1R	SF	A	A	A	A	A	W	W	W	2R	SF	QF	W
Men's Championship	A	A	A	A	A	A	A	W	F	A	A	A	A	W
Win–loss	0-1	3-1	0-0	0-0	0-0	1-1	0-1	10-0	11-2	6-1	1-1	5-2	2-1	9-0

Tournament	2000	2001	2002	2003	2004	2005	2006	2007	2008	2009	2010
World Championship		W*	2R			W			1R	W	
Open Championship	F	W*	W	F	SF	SF	F	F	SF	SF	W
Men's Championship	W	W	W	A	W	A	A	A	A	A	A
Win–loss	8-1	10-0	9-1	4-1	7-1	8-1	3-1	4-1	3-2	7-1	5-0

Tournament	2011	2012	2013	2014	2015	2016	2017	2018	2019	2020	2021	2022	2023	2024	2025	SR	W–L	Win %
World Championship		W	SF			SF		F		W			2R		W	6 / 17	48 - 11	81.4
Open Championship	W	W	W	F	QF	QF	W	A	F	1R	W	F	SF	QF	A	12 / 33	104 - 21	83.2
Men's Championship	A	SF	A	A	A	A	A	A	A	NH	A	A	A	A	A	6 / 8	33 - 2	94.3
Win–loss	5-0	11-1	7-1	4-1	1-1	4-2	4-0	4-1	3-1	5-1	4-0	3-1	3-2	1-1	5-0	24 / 58	185 - 34	84.5

^{*} The 1989 and 2001 World and Open Championships were combined events.

=== Major Championship Finals: 32 (22 titles, 10 runners-up) ===
Outcome	Year	Championship	Opponent	Score
Winner	1993	Men's Championship	Chris Clarke	+tpo, +tp, +tp
Winner	1993	Open Championship	David Maugham	-25tp, +26tp, +19, -11tp, +26tp
Runner-up	1994	Men's Championship	Michael Taylor	+26tp, -26tp, -26tp
Winner	1994	Open Championship	Chris Clarke	+16tp, +26
Winner	1995	Open Championship	Robert Fulford	+24tp, +26tp, -26tp, -26tp, +26tp
Winner	1999	Men's Championship	Stephen Mulliner	-17, -17tp, +26tp, +10, +16tp
Winner	1999	Open Championship	Robert Fulford	+26tp, -26tp, -26tp, +26tp, +26tp
Winner	2000	Men's Championship	Toby Garrison	+26tp, +1, -26tp, +26tp
Runner-up	2000	Open Championship	Stephen Mulliner	+25tp, -9tpo, -20tp, -20tp
Winner	2001	Men's Championship	Robert Fulford	+3, -8tp, +8, -20tp, +17qnp
Winner	2001	World Championship	Robert Fulford	-16tp, +17sxp, -3, +26sxp, +26qp
Winner	2002	Men's Championship	David Goacher	+17sxp, +15sxp, +17octp
Winner	2002	Open Championship	Chris Clarke	+12, +26sxp, +26sxp
Runner-up	2003	Open Championship	Robert Fulford	-26tp, -12, -18tp
Winner	2004	Men's Championship	Peter Trimmer	-8tp, +17sxp, +26sxp, -19tp, +26sxp
Winner	2005	World Championship	Robert Fulford	+17tp, +26sxp, +17sxp
Runner-up	2006	Open Championship	Robert Fulford	+2qp, -25sxp, -26qnp, +8sxp, -1
Runner-up	2007	Open Championship	Robert Fulford	-26tp, -25sxp, +16tp, -26sxp
Winner	2009	World Championship	Ben Rothman	+13tp, +22, +18tp
Winner	2010	Open Championship	Robert Fletcher	+16 -17tp +17tp -26tp +12tpo
Winner	2011	Open Championship	Robert Fulford	-18tp, +26sxp, +17, +26sxp
Winner	2012	World Championship	Robert Fletcher	-12tpo, +17tp, -26tp, +17tp, +26qp
Winner	2012	Open Championship	Robert Fulford	+25sxp, -14tp, +24sxp, +24sxp
Winner	2013	Open Championship	Samir Patel	+26sxp, +25sxp, +15qnp
Runner-up	2014	Open Championship	Robert Fulford	-16, -5qp, -18qp
Winner	2017	Open Championship	Robert Fulford	-25sxp, -3, +20sxp, +26sxp, +19sxp
Runner-up	2018	World Championship	Paddy Chapman	-7tp, +26tp, +26tp, -15tp, -17tp
Runner-up	2019	Open Championship	James Death	-18tp, -18tp
Winner	2020	World Championship	Matthew Essick	+14tp, -12, +17tp, +26tp
Winner	2021	Open Championship	Robert Fulford	-3sxp, +25sxp, +24sxp, +19sxp
Runner-up	2023	Open Championship	James Death	-19tp, +17sxp, -2, -26tp
Winner	2025	World Championship	Mark Avery	+7tp, +26tp, +26tp

The 2001 World Championship and Open Championship were a combined event.
