= Croquet at the 1900 Summer Olympics – Singles, two balls =

Olympic croquet event

Two ball singles croquet at the Games of the II Olympiad
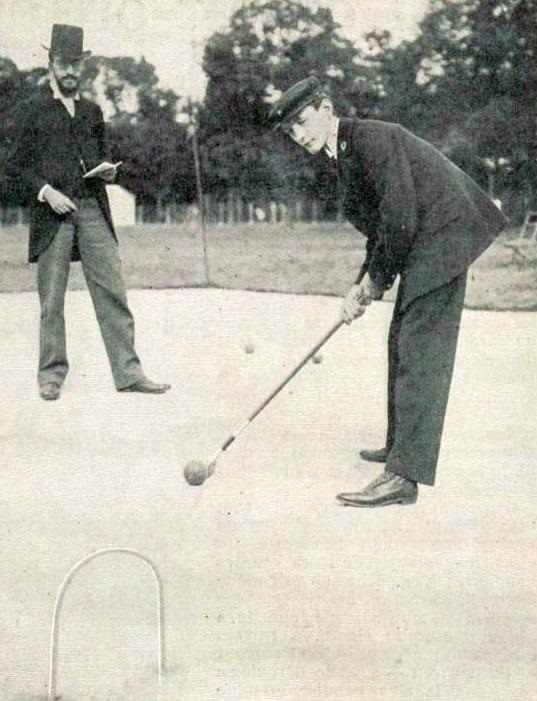
- Croquet at the 1900 Summer Olympics
- Venue: Bois de Boulogne
- Dates: July 4 and 11
- Competitors: 6 from 1 nation

Medalists
1st place, gold medalist(s)		Chrétien Waydelich; France
2nd place, silver medalist(s)		Maurice Vignerot; France
3rd place, bronze medalist(s)		Jacques Sautereau; France

The 1900 Olympic Croquet two-ball singles tournament was held on 4 and 11 July 1900. Eight athletes from France competed. The event was won by Chrétien Waydelich, the only person to earn two singles medals in Olympic croquet (with a bronze in the one-ball competition as well). Silver went to Maurice Vignerot and bronze to Jacques Sautereau.

== Background ==
This was the only appearance of the event at the Olympics; it was one of three croquet competitions in 1900. Croquet was one of the first Olympic sports open to women (with only sailing having female competitors before croquet, due to that sport taking place earlier in 1900), with two of the six players in this event being women.

== Competition format ==
The competition format is unclear. There were two rounds. The first round appears to have been a head-to-head, best-of-three competition. The winners advanced to the second round, as did one of the losers. The second round appears to have been a round-robin with each match being best-of-three.

== Schedule ==
Date	Time	Round
Wednesday, 4 July 1900		First round
Wednesday, 11 July 1900		Final

== Results ==
=== Round 1 ===
Winner	Score	Loser
Maurice Vignerot (FRA)	2-0 (42-40)	Louise Anne Marie Després (FRA)
Jacques Sautereau (FRA)	2-0 (41-19)	Al. Blachère (FRA)
Chrétien Waydelich (FRA)	w/o	Jeanne Filleul-Brohy (FRA)

=== Final ===
The second round was conducted as a round-robin.

Pos	Player	Nation	W	L	CW	MV	JS	AB
1st place, gold medalist(s)	Chrétien Waydelich	France	3	0		2–1	1–0 (Note: Games and scores unknown)	1–0 (Note: Games and scores unknown)
2nd place, silver medalist(s)	Maurice Vignerot	France	2	1	1–2		2–1	2–0 (Note: Walkover)
3rd place, bronze medalist(s)	Jacques Sautereau	France	1	2	0–1 (Note: Games and scores unknown)	1–2		1–0 (Note: Games and scores unknown)
4	Al. Blachère	France	0	3	0–1 (Note: Games and scores unknown)	0–2 (Note: Walkover)	0–1 (Note: Games and scores unknown)	

Source: Olympedia

== Results summary ==
Rank	Player	Nation
1st place, gold medalist(s)	Chrétien Waydelich	France
2nd place, silver medalist(s)	Maurice Vignerot	France
3rd place, bronze medalist(s)	Jacques Sautereau	France
4	Al. Blachère	France
5	Louise Anne Marie Després	France
5	Jeanne Filleul-Brohy	France
