= Roque =

American variant of croquet

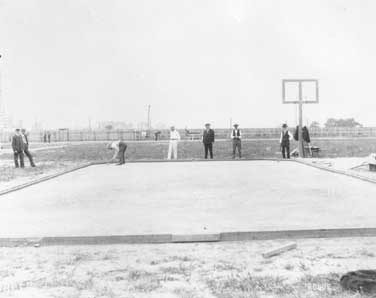
- The Olympic roque competition in 1904.
- Highest governing body: American Roque League (1916-1970s?) National Two Ball Roque Association (?-1970s?); National Roque Association (1899-?) National Croquet Association (1882-99)
- First played: 1880s

Characteristics
- Team members: 1-on-1
- Type: Outdoor, croquet
- Equipment: Mallets, balls
- Venue: Curbed clay court, with arches

Presence
- Olympic: Summer 1904
- Obsolete: Yes

Roque (/roʊk/ ROHK) is an American variant of croquet played on a hard, smooth surface. Popular in the first quarter of the 20th century and billed "the Game of the Century" by its enthusiasts, it was an Olympic sport in the 1904 Summer Games, replacing croquet from the previous games.

== Roque court and equipment ==
Roque is played on a hard sand or clay 30 by 60 foot (approximately 9 by 19 m) court bordered by a boundary wall, a curb bevelled at the corners to form an octagon. Players use this wall to bank balls similarly to how billiard balls are played off the cushions of a billiard table.

The wickets, called arches, are permanently anchored in the court. The arches are narrow as in professional six-wicket croquet. The court has ten arches in seven points configured in a double diamond (or figure-8). The two farthest end points and the central point of the figure-8 are double arches (one after the other) while the four side (or corner) points have single arches. Each arch of the double arches at either end of the court count as a separate arch, but the double arches in the center (which are closer together) are scored as a single arch. While in nine-wicket croquet the single central wicket opens up to the length of the court facing the stakes, in roque the double center arches face the sides of the court. Roque uses two stakes: at the head of the court is the "head stake"; the other stake at the far end of the court is the "turning stake."

The mallets with which the balls are struck have a shorter handle (approx. 24 inches or 60 cm) than croquet mallets. One end of the mallet is surfaced with rubber, the other with wood, plastic, or aluminum.

== Differences from croquet ==
The rules of roque are largely similar to those of croquet, with some notable exceptions:

- In roque, a wall marks the boundary of the court off of which the ball may be caromed. There is also a "playing line" 28 inches in from the wall marked in chalk. A player's ball which comes to rest between the playing line and the wall is out of bounds and the fouled ball is placed at the point where the ball crossed the line (rather than a point nearest the line as in croquet).
- The hard court surface is "faster" than the grass croquet court, which affects swerve and deflection much as the speed of billiard table cloth affects billiard play.
- Using the rubber side of the mallet, roque players apply spin to a ball to affect its movement, as in billiards.
- In croquet, the two teams are the balls colored red and yellow versus blue and black. In roque, the two teams are red and blue versus black and white. The order of play is red, white, blue, black.
- In roque, the starting player is determined similarly to billiards: each player "lags" the ball, i.e. shoots it from one end of the court to the other, and the player whose ball is closest to the playing line at the opposite end of the court without touching the opposing wall, arches, or other balls, wins the lag and goes first.
- After the opening lag, the balls are placed on the court at the four boundary line corners nearest the center of the court, with partner balls (red and blue, white and black) diagonally opposite from each other. The playing ball and ball next in sequence occupy the corners at the head of the court, with the choice of corners going to the player who won the lag. The player then attempts to make the first arch through roqueting another ball, caroming into the arch, or by any other lawful means. The player may also forfeit his opening shot.
- While croquet is played with six wickets or nine wickets, roque is played with ten arches configured similarly to nine-wicket lawn croquet. However, the two center arches count as a single arch. Roque has two stakes, as in lawn croquet, the "home stake" and the "turning stake."
- The double center arches score as a single arch. While the center arches can be made in several successive turns of play, the ball must remain "within limits of center," have committed no foul, and contacted no live ball.
- After scoring the center arches, the player scores the side (or corner) arches by passing the ball from the corner of the court through the arch heading towards the center of the court, opposite from lawn croquet.
- "A ball is within the limits of the center when any part of it is within the lines of a rectangle circumscribed by laying a straight edge successively against the inside of both stems of each arch, the inside of the stem of each arch nearest the home stake, and the inside of the stem of each arch nearest the turning stake." Rule 95, Official Rules and Regulations of the American Roque League (1958).
- The double arches at the head and turn of the court count as separate arches and are wider apart than the center arches.
- The most points that can be scored by one side in a game is 32: 16 points per ball (14 points for the arches and 2 points for the stakes).
- Like baseball, roque is played in "innings," with ten innings per game. The game is over once one side either "stakes out" (thus scoring 32 points) or after ten innings expire. If both teams have the same score after 10 innings, the game ends in a tie (although some tournaments may permit extra innings). Scoring all of the arches in a single inning, thus winning the game outright, is called a "home run." Some games could, by agreement or tournament rule, be timed.
- In roque, the side (or corner) arches (identified as points 3, 5, 11, and 13) can only be scored by a roquet or continuation shot.
- Unlike croquet, both balls must be staked out in the same turn in order to outright win the game. By necessity, this requires the first ball to be staked out on a roquet shot and the second ball to be staked out on the ensuing continuation shot. Thus, unlike croquet, one side cannot defensively "stake-out" an opponent's rover in roque.
- Like croquet, roque makes use of deadness. However, unlike American croquet which employs the carryover deadness rule, roque follows the Association rule wherein deadness is cleared after the player's turn ends.
- Like croquet, roque players mark their progress on the court by placing colored markers on the arches. However, while croquet traditionally places the marker on the top of the wicket for the first pass-through and on the side of the wicket for the second pass, roque markers were usually placed at the top of the arch and were labeled on one side. The labeled side would be facing the position side.

Roque developed sub-variants, including two-ball roque and royal roque.

== History ==
=== Historical roque ===
The name "roque" was suggested by Samuel Crosby of New York City in 1899, who came to it by removing the initial "c" and final "t" from "croquet." The National Croquet Association, formed in 1882, thereafter changed its name to the National Roque Association in 1899. "Roque" is not to be confused with "roquet" /roʊˈkeɪ/, the term used in both roque and croquet for the bonus shot a player earns after striking another ball (on which he is not "dead") with his own.

The American Roque League was founded in 1916 and, after mergers with various other roque entities, it became the centralized roque league on August 20, 1920. It last published its rules in 1959; the National Two Ball Roque Association last published its revised rules in 1961.

=== Contemporary roque ===
In 2004, the American Roque and Croquet Association suspended tournaments indefinitely as the number of participants at the Nationals had dropped to single figures.

Roque is still played by a small number of people in the United States. An historic roque court in Clinton, Illinois was restored to playing condition in 2013. A roque tournament is held annually in Angelica, New York.
