= Croquet =

Sport

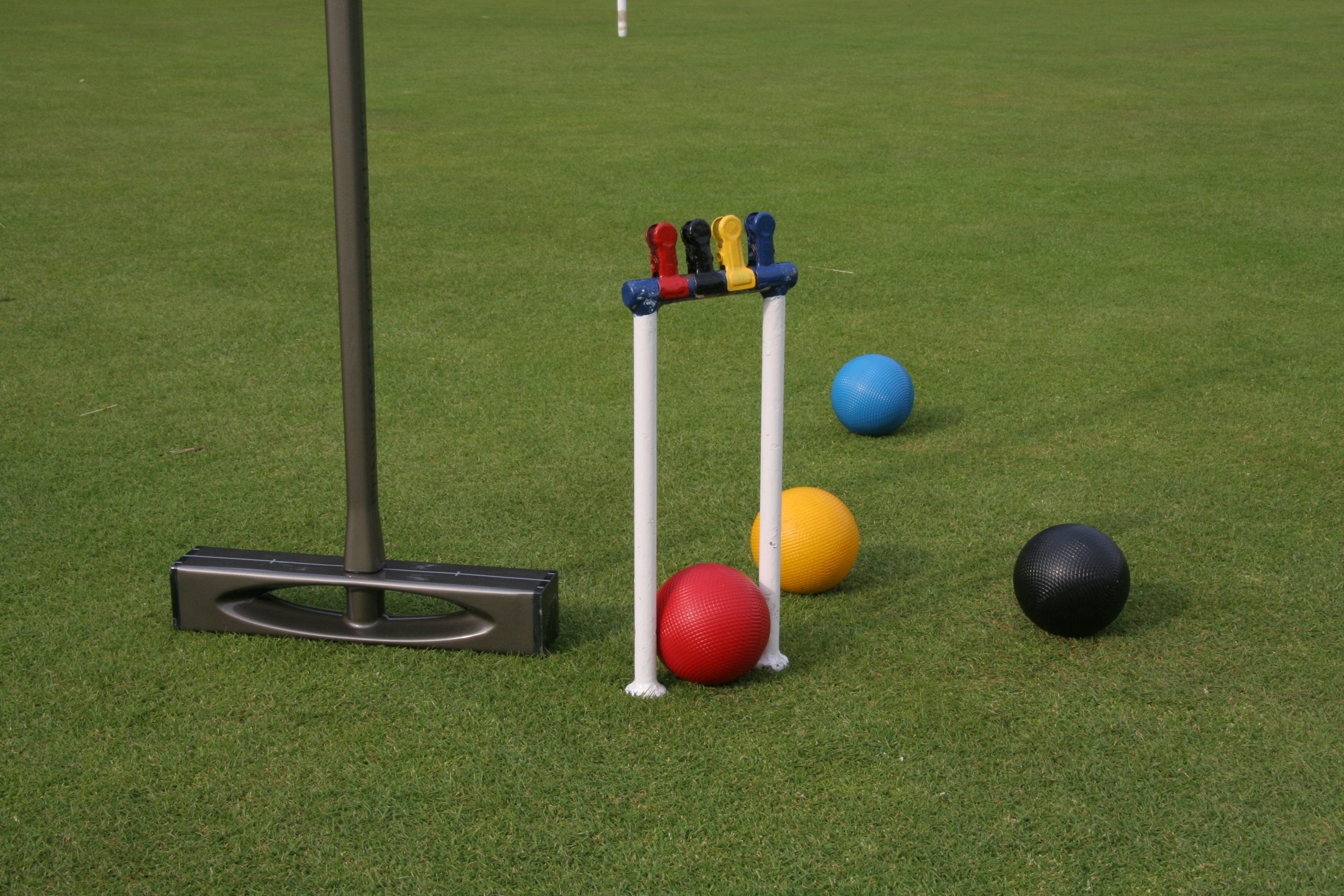
- Modern croquet equipment
- Highest governing body: World Croquet Federation (WCF) (association and golf); United States Croquet Association (USCA) (6-wicket and 9-wicket)
- First played: 1856, England

Characteristics
- Contact: No
- Team members: Singles, doubles, and team events
- Type: Mallet sport
- Equipment: Mallets, balls, stakes, hoops or wickets

Presence
- Olympic: Only in 1900 Summer Olympics
- Paralympic: No
- World Games: No

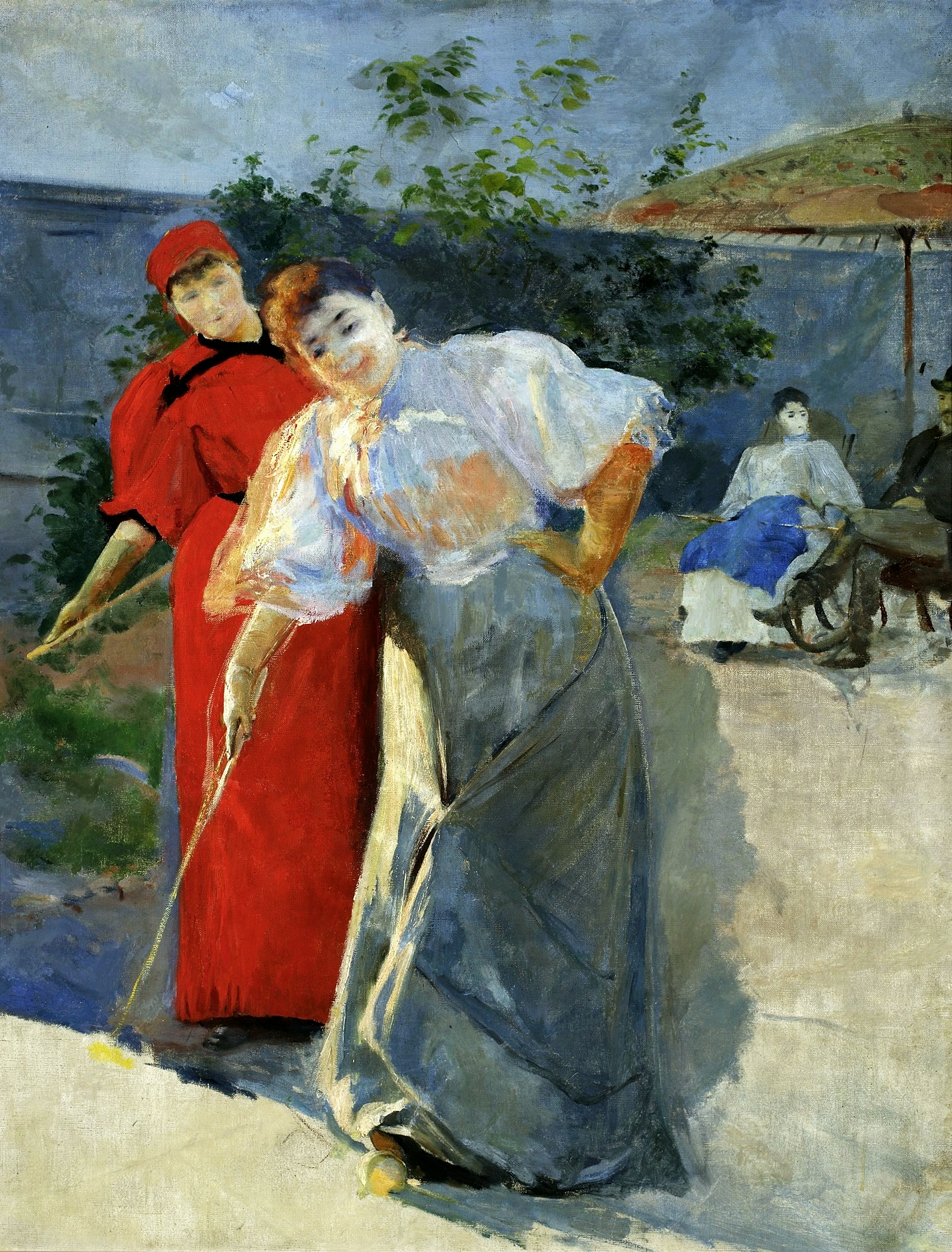
Leon Wyczółkowski, A Game of Croquet (1892–1895), National Museum, Warsaw

Croquet (UK: /ˈkroʊkeɪ, -ki/ or US: /kroʊˈkeɪ/) is a sport which involves hitting wooden, plastic, or composite balls with a mallet through hoops (often called "wickets" in the United States) embedded in a grass playing court.

The sport was codified in England in the 1860s and then spread overseas. However, similar games have been recorded back to the late Middle Ages. Today, there are several variations of the game.

At its highest level, the game is played internationally with top players coming from Australia, Egypt, England, South Africa, Spain, and the United States among other countries.

== Variations ==
In all forms of croquet, individual players or teams take turns striking the balls, scoring points by knocking them through a hoop. The game ends when a player or team reaches a predetermined number of points. Several variations exist that differ in when and how a stroke may be legally played, when points are scored, the layout of the lawn, and the target score. Commonly, social games adopt further non-standard variations to adapt play to the conditions. In all versions, players of all ages and genders compete on equal terms and are ranked together.

Two versions of the game are directly governed by the World Croquet Federation, which organises individual and team World Championships. Other regional variants which developed in parallel remain common in parts of the world.

=== Association croquet ===
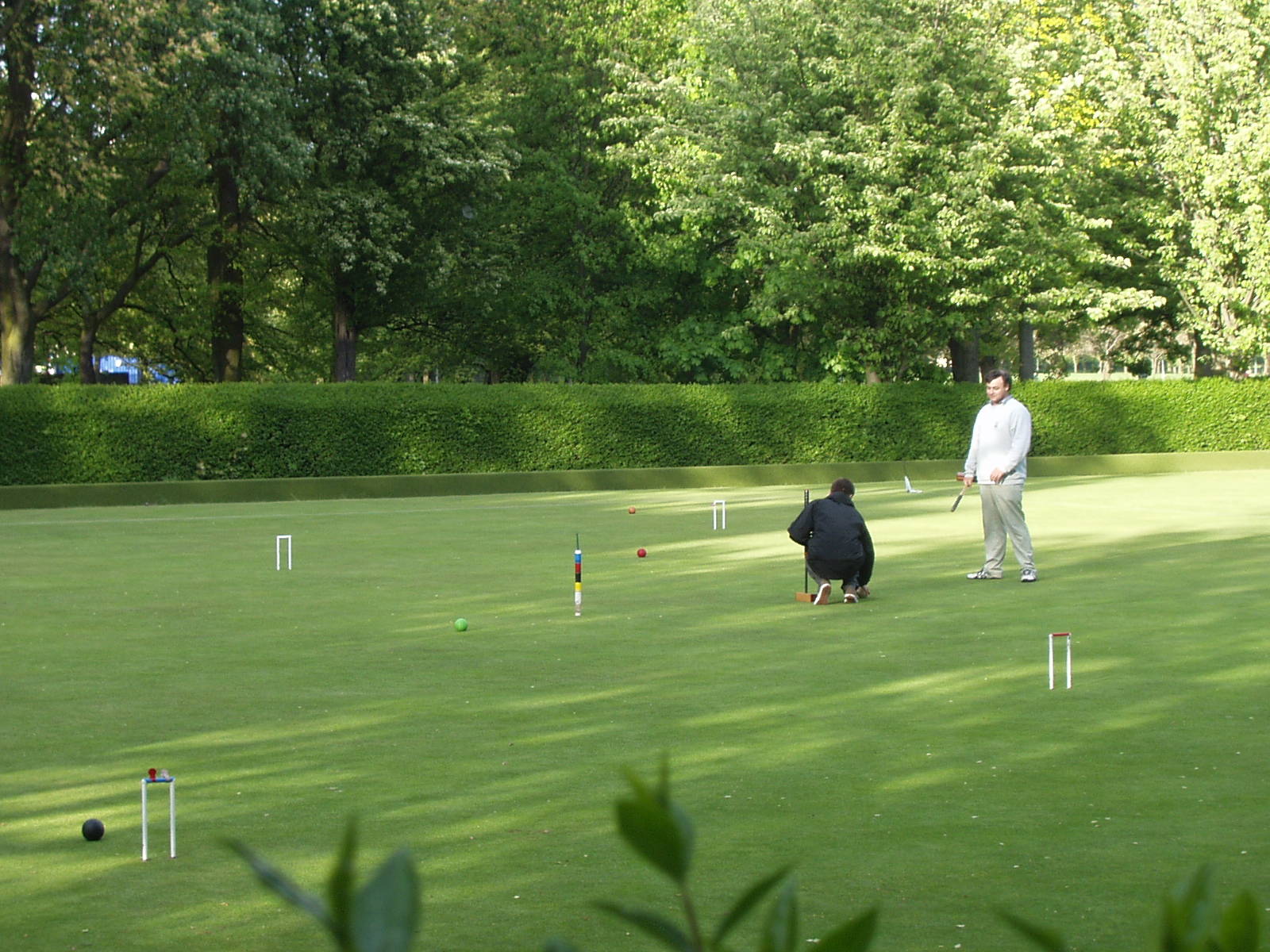
Croquet being played at a club in the UK; four balls are visible on the lawn black, green, red, and brown showing that two games are in progress (known as "double-banking"): red and black belong to one game, green and brown to the other

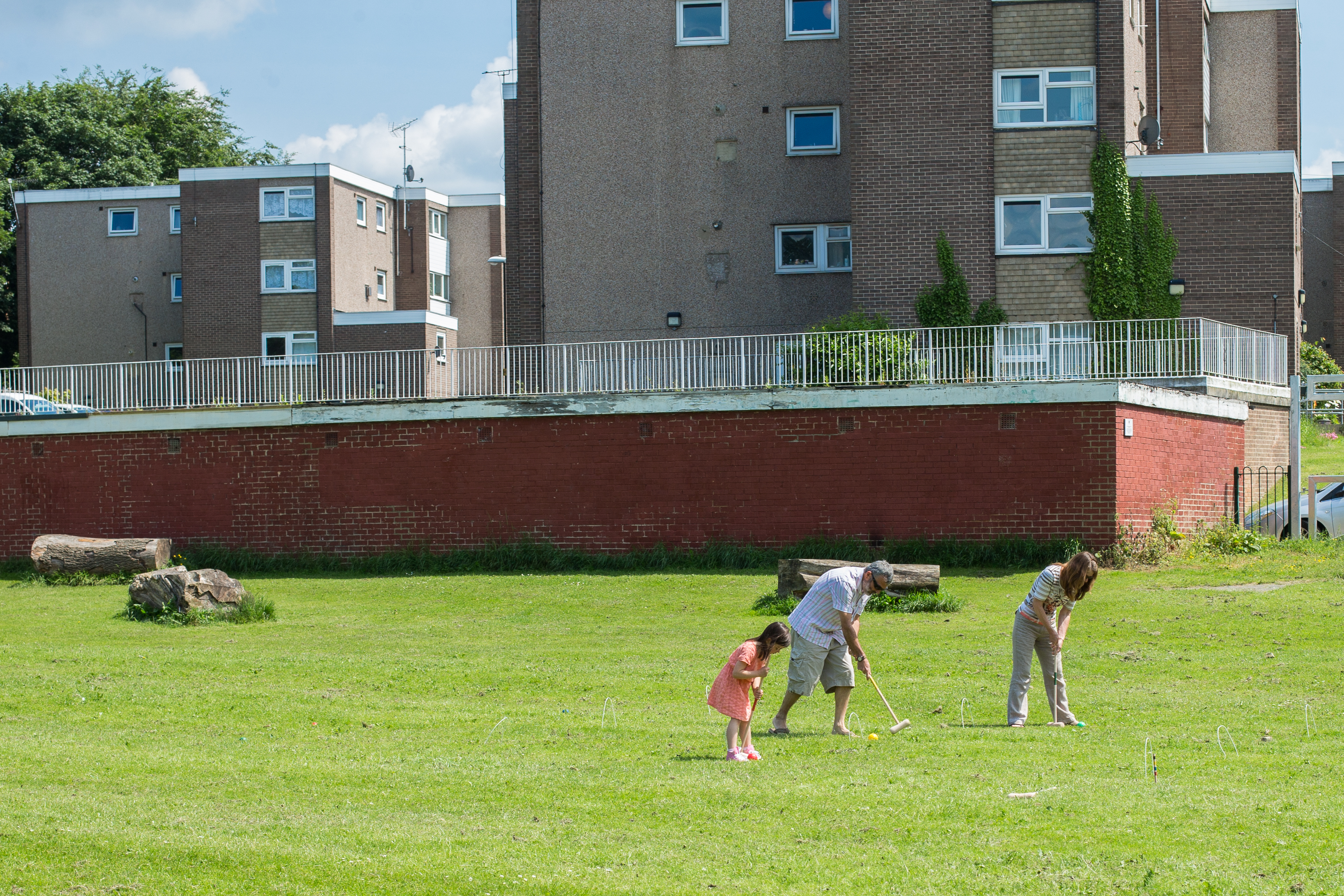
Croquet being played recreationally in Wetherby, West Yorkshire

Association croquet is played between two individuals or teams, each playing with two balls. The object of the game is to be the first to strike each of one's balls through all six hoops in both directions, in a fixed order, and to strike the central peg. Each of these actions scores a point, with the maximum score being 26 points.

The first four turns must be taken to play the four balls onto the lawn from one of two "baulk lines" defined as one yard into the lawn on the western half of the south boundary and the eastern half of the north boundary. After this, a player elects at the start of each turn which of their two balls to play for the duration of that turn.

During a turn, a player may earn extra shots in two ways. A player earns a single extra shot by scoring a hoop point (hitting the striker's ball through a hoop), or two extra shots by causing their ball to contact another ball-an action called a "roquet". When a roquet is made, the player may pick up their ball and place it in contact with the roqueted ball. The next shot must move both the player's ball and the roqueted ball, and it is the "croquet" stroke that gives the game its name. After a successful croquet stroke, the player has a single further shot, known as the "continuation". During a turn, each of the other three balls may only be croqueted once between hoop points, but by stringing together a series of roquets, croquets, and scored hoops, several points may be scored in a single turn.

Advanced variants of association croquet give further penalties to dissuade skilled players from running every hoop with a ball on a single break, while handicap versions give weaker players chances to continue play after making an error. The extra turns, called "bisques" are effective in levelling the odds of winning.

=== Golf croquet ===
Golf croquet is played between two individuals or teams, each playing with two balls. The object of the game is to reach a certain number of points, typically seven, earned by being the first to run a hoop.

The game opens by playing each ball into the lawn from the fourth (south-eastern) corner of the lawn. Balls must be played in order (for the primary ball colours, this is blue, red, black, and yellow), and this order of play is maintained throughout the game. Hoops are contested in a fixed order, with a point awarded to the owner of the first ball to pass through the hoop in the correct direction. After a point is awarded, all players move on to contest the next hoop. Balls that are played more than halfway to the next hoop before a point is scored are considered offside, and are moved to penalty areas.

Golf croquet is the fastest-growing version of the game, owing largely to its simplicity and competitiveness. There is an especially large interest in competitive success among players in Egypt. By comparison with association croquet, golf croquet requires a smaller variety of shots and emphasises strategic skills and accurate shot-making. Games are shorter, balls are more likely to be hit harder, and 'jump' shots are more likely to be witnessed, where a ball is played to deliberately jump off the ground and over another ball.

=== American six-wicket ===
The American-rules version of croquet is the dominant version of the game in the United States and is also widely played in Canada. It is governed by the United States Croquet Association. Its genesis is mostly in association croquet, but it differs in a number of important ways that reflect the home-grown traditions of American "backyard" croquet. Official rules were first published in 1894 by the Spalding Athletic Library, as adopted by the National American Croquet Association.

American six-wicket uses the same six-wicket layout as both association croquet and golf croquet, and is also played by two individuals or teams, each owning two balls.

Like association croquet, the object of the game is to be the first to pass each of their balls through all six hoops in both directions and to strike the central peg, for a total of 26 points. Unlike association croquet, balls are always played in the same sequence (blue, red, black, yellow). The limitation of roqueting each ball once between hoop points is, unlike in association croquet, carried over from turn to turn until the ball scores the next hoop. In American six-wicket, this is termed "deadness", and a separate board is required to keep track of the deadness for all four balls. A further difference is the more restrictive boundary-line rules of American croquet. In the American game, roqueting a ball out of bounds or running a hoop so that the ball goes out of bounds causes the turn to end, and balls that go out of bounds are replaced only nine inches (23 cm) from the boundary rather than one yard (91 cm) as in association croquet. "Attacking" balls on the boundary line to bring them into play is thus far more challenging.

=== Nine-wicket ===
Nine-wicket croquet is played mainly in the United States and Canada. In this version of croquet, there are nine wickets, two stakes, and up to six players with one ball each. The course is arranged in a double-diamond pattern, with one stake at each end of the course. Players start at one stake, navigate one side of the double diamond, hit the turning stake, then navigate the opposite side of the double diamond and hit the starting stake to end. If playing individually (Cutthroat), the first player to stake out is the winner. In partnership play, all members of a team must stake out, and a player might choose to avoid staking out (becoming a Rover) in order to help a lagging teammate.

Each time a ball is roqueted, the striker gets two bonus shots. For the first bonus shot, the player has four options:

- From a mallet-head distance or less away from the ball that was hit ("taking a mallet-head")
- From a position in contact with the ball that was hit, with the striker's ball held steady by the striker's foot or hand (a "foot shot" or "hand shot")
- From a position in contact with the ball that was hit, with the striker's ball not held by foot or hand (a "croquet shot")
- From where the striker ball stopped after the roquet

The second bonus shot ("continuation shot") is an ordinary shot played from where the striker ball came to rest.

An alternative endgame is "poison": in this variant, a player who has scored the last wicket but not hit the starting stake becomes a "poison ball", which may eliminate other balls from the game by roqueting them. A non-poison ball that roquets a poison ball has the normal options. A poison ball that hits a stake or passes through any wicket (possibly through the action of a non-poison player) is eliminated. The last person remaining is the winner.

== International croquet ==
International croquet competition is governed by the World Croquet Federation, often referred to as the WCF. Croquet Europe is a subsidiary of the WCF set up to manage European croquet tournaments and provide a closer link to European clubs in the management of international croquet.

As well as club-level games, county-level tournaments, and leagues, there are regular world championships and international matches between croquet-playing countries. The sport has particularly strong followings in the United Kingdom, Spain, United States, New Zealand, Australia, and Egypt; many other countries also play. Both association croquet (AC) and golf croquet (GC) are competed in international championships. Every four years, the top countries play in the World Team Championships in AC (the MacRobertson Shield) and GC (the Openshaw Shield). The current world rankings show England in top place for AC, followed by Australia in second place, and New Zealand in third place, with the United States in fourth position. The same four countries appear in the top six of the GC country rankings, below Egypt in top position, and with Spain at number six.

Individual World Championships usually take place every two or three years. The 2025 AC World Championships took place in West Palm Beach, Florida; the winner was Reg Bamford. The current Women's Association Croquet World Champion (2023) is Debbie Lines of England.

The most prestigious international team competition in association croquet is the MacRobertson International Croquet Shield. It is contested every three to four years among Australia, England, New Zealand, and the United States. Other nations compete in Tier 2 and Tier 3 World Team Championships. Teams are promoted and relegated between the lower tiers, but there is no relegation to or promotion from the MacRobertson Shield. The current holders of the MacRobertson Shield are England, who won the title in 2023. At the Golf Croquet World Team Championships, eight nations contest the Openshaw Shield. There is promotion and relegation between Tier 1, Tier 2, and Tier 3. The current holders of the Openshaw Shield are the USA, who won in 2025. The world's top 10 association croquet players as of October 2025 were Robert Fletcher (Australia), Jamie Burch (England), Reg Bamford (South Africa), Zack Watson (USA), Mark Avery (England), Paddy Chapman (New Zealand), Matthew Essick (USA), Logan McCorkindale (New Zealand), Robert Fulford (England) and Simon Hockey (Australia).

In April 2013, Reg Bamford of South Africa beat Ahmed Nasr of Egypt in the final of the Golf Croquet World Championship in Cairo, becoming the first person to simultaneously hold the title in both association croquet and golf croquet. As of 2025, the Golf Croquet World Champion was Blake Fields (USA), and the Women's Golf Croquet World Champion was Jamie Gumbrell (Australia). In 2018, two international championships open to both sexes were won by women: in May, Rachel Gee of England beat Pierre Beaudry of Belgium to win the European Golf Croquet championship, and in October, Hanan Rashad of Egypt beat Yasser Fathy (also from Egypt) to win the World over-50s Golf Croquet championship.

Croquet was an event at the 1900 Summer Olympics. Roque, an American variation on croquet, was an event at the 1904 Summer Olympics. Croquet is recognized as the first Olympic sport to include female participants. In the 1900 Olympic croquet events, France claimed victory in all three competitions. Gaston Aumoitte won the one-ball singles, Chrétien Waydelich won the two-ball singles, and the doubles event was won by the pair of Gaston Aumoitte and Georges Johin, securing all the medals as all 10 participants were French.

== History ==
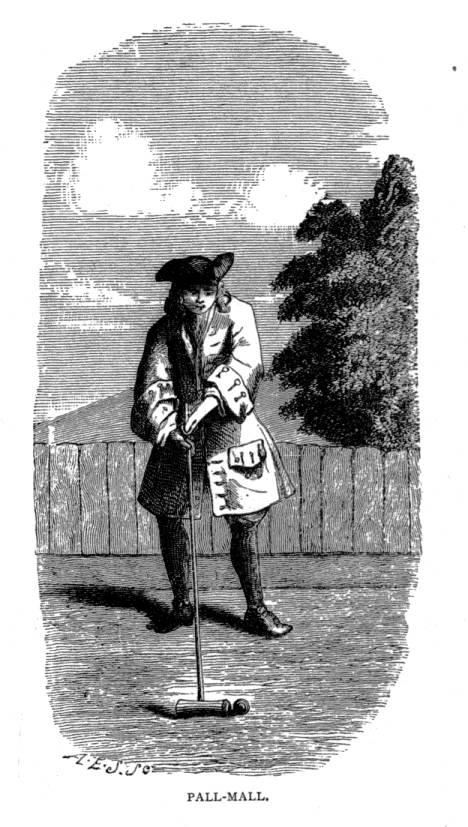
Paille-maille (pall-mall) illustrated in Old English Sports, Pastimes and Customs, published 1891; original image by Lauthier, 1717

The oldest document to bear the word croquet with a description of the modern game is the set of rules registered by Isaac Spratt in November 1856 with the Stationers' Company of London. This record is now in the Public Record Office. In 1868, the first croquet all-comers meet was held at Moreton-in-Marsh, Gloucestershire, and in the same year, the All England Croquet Club was formed in Wimbledon, London.

Regardless of when and by what route it reached the British Isles and the British colonies in its recognizable form, croquet is, like pall-mall and trucco, among the later forms of ground billiards, which as a class have been popular in Western Europe back to at least the Late Middle Ages, with roots in classical antiquity, including sometimes the use of arches and pegs along with balls and mallets or other striking sticks (some more akin to modern field hockey sticks). By the 12th century, a team ball game called la soule or choule, akin to a chaotic version of hockey or football (depending on whether sticks were used), was regularly played in France and southern Britain between villages or parishes; it was attested in Cornwall as early as 1283.

In the book Queen of Games: The History of Croquet, Nicky Smith presents two theories of the origin of the modern game of croquet, which took England by storm in the 1860s and then spread overseas.

=== French origin theory ===
The first explanation is that the ancestral game was introduced to Britain from France during the 1660–1685 reign of Charles II of England, Scotland, and Ireland and was played under the name of paille-maille (among other spellings, today usually pall-mall), derived ultimately from Latin words for 'ball and mallet' (the latter also found in the name of the earlier French game, jeu de mail). This was the explanation given in the ninth edition of Encyclopædia Britannica, dated 1877.

In his 1801 book The Sports and Pastimes of the People of England, Joseph Strutt described the way pall-mall was played in England at the time:

Pale-maille is a game wherein a round box[wood] ball is struck with a mallet through a high arch of iron, which he that can do at the fewest blows, or at the number agreed upon, wins. It is to be observed that there are two of these arches, that is, one at either end of the alley. The game of mall was a fashionable amusement in the reign of Charles the Second, and the walk in Saint James's Park, now called the Mall, received its name from having been appropriated to the purpose of playing at mall, where Charles himself and his courtiers frequently exercised themselves in the practice of this pastime.

While the name pall-mall and various games bearing this name also appeared elsewhere (France and Italy), the description above suggests that the croquet-like games in particular were popular in England by the early 17th century. Some other early modern sources refer to pall-mall being played over a large distance (as in golf); however, an image in Strutt's 1801 book shows a croquet-like ground billiards game (balls on the ground, hoop, bats, and peg) being played over a short, garden-sized distance. The image's caption describes the game as "a curious ancient pastime", confirming that croquet games were not new in early-19th-century England.

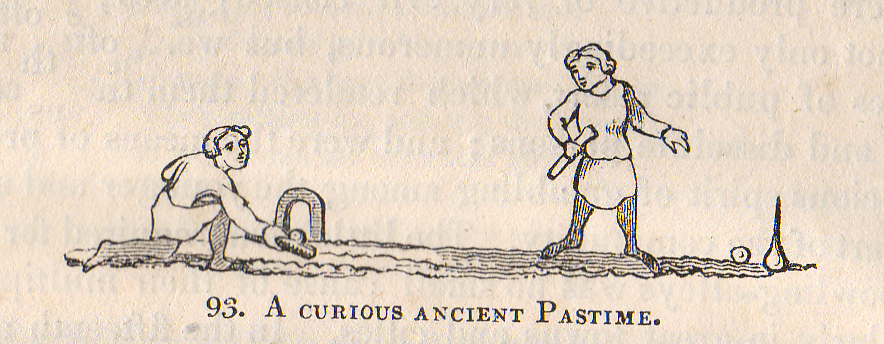
Early croquet-like game from The Sports and Pastimes of the People of England, first published in 1801; a hoop, peg, and two players with balls are clearly shown Such implements in ground billiards games date to classical antiquity.

In Samuel Johnson's 1755 dictionary, his definition of "pall-mall" clearly describes a game with similarities to modern croquet: "A play in which the ball is struck with a mallet through an iron ring". However, there is no evidence that pall-mall involved the croquet stroke, which is the distinguishing characteristic of the modern game.

=== Irish origin theory ===
The second theory is that the rules of the modern game of croquet arrived in Ireland during the 1850s, perhaps after being brought there from Brittany, where a similar game was played on the beaches. Regular contact between Ireland and France had continued since the Norman invasion of Ireland in 1169. By no later than the early 15th century, the game jeu de mail (itself ancestral to pall-mall and perhaps to indoor billiards) was popular in France, including in the courts of Henry II in the 16th century and Louis XIV of the 17th.

At least one version of it, rouët ('wheel'), was a multi-ball lawn game. Records show a game called "crookey", similar to croquet, being played at Castlebellingham in County Louth, Ireland, in 1834, which was introduced to Galway in 1835 and played on the bishop's palace garden, and in the same year to the genteel Dublin suburb of Kingstown (today Dún Laoghaire) where it was first spelled as "croquet". There is, however, no pre-1858 Irish document that describes the way the game was played; in particular, there is no reference to the distinctive croquet stroke, which is described above under "Variations: Association". The noted croquet historian Dr. Prior, in his book of 1872, makes the categorical statement, "One thing only is certain: it is from Ireland that croquet came to England and it was on the lawn of the late Lord Lonsdale that it was first played in this country."

John Jaques apparently claimed in a letter to Arthur Lillie in 1873 that he had himself seen the game played in Ireland, writing, "I made the implements and published directions (such as they were) before Mr. Spratt [mentioned above] introduced the subject to me." Whatever the truth of the matter, Jaques certainly played an important role in popularising the game, producing editions of the rules in 1857, 1860, and 1864.

=== Heyday and decline ===
Croquet became highly popular as a social pastime in England during the 1860s. It was enthusiastically adopted and promoted by the Earl of Essex, who held lavish croquet parties at Cassiobury House, his stately home in Watford, Hertfordshire, and the Earl even launched his own Cassiobury brand croquet set. By 1867, Jaques had printed 65,000 copies of his Laws and Regulations of the game. It quickly spread to other Anglophone countries, including Australia, Canada, New Zealand, South Africa, and the United States. No doubt one of the attractions was that the game could be played by both sexes; this also ensured a certain amount of adverse comment.

It is no coincidence that the game became popular at the same time as the cylinder lawn mower, since croquet can only be played well on a lawn that is flat and finely-cut.

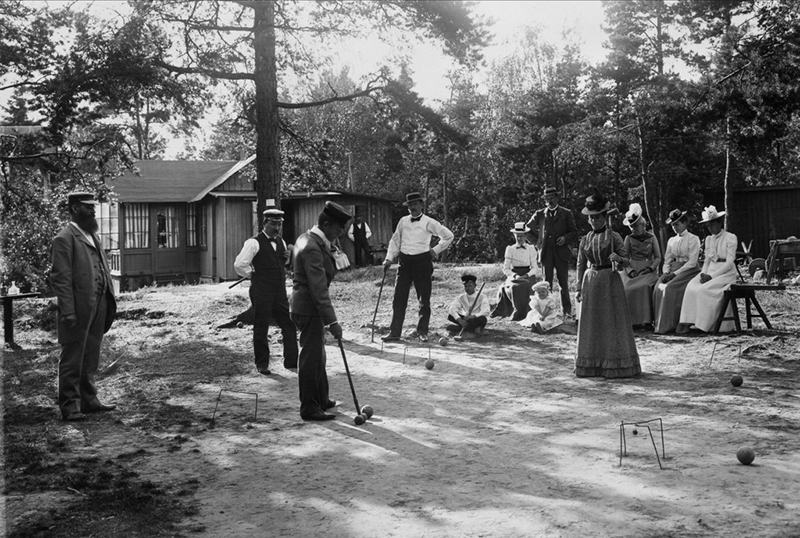
Croquet players in Sweden, early 20th century

By the late 1870s, however, croquet had been eclipsed by another fashionable game, lawn tennis, and many of the newly created croquet clubs, including the All England Club at Wimbledon, converted some or all of their lawns into tennis courts. There was a revival in the 1890s, but going forward croquet was always a minority sport, with national individual participation amounting to a few thousand players. The All England Lawn Tennis and Croquet Club still has a croquet lawn, but has not hosted any significant tournaments. Its championship was won 38 times by Bernard Neal. The English headquarters for the game is now in Cheltenham.

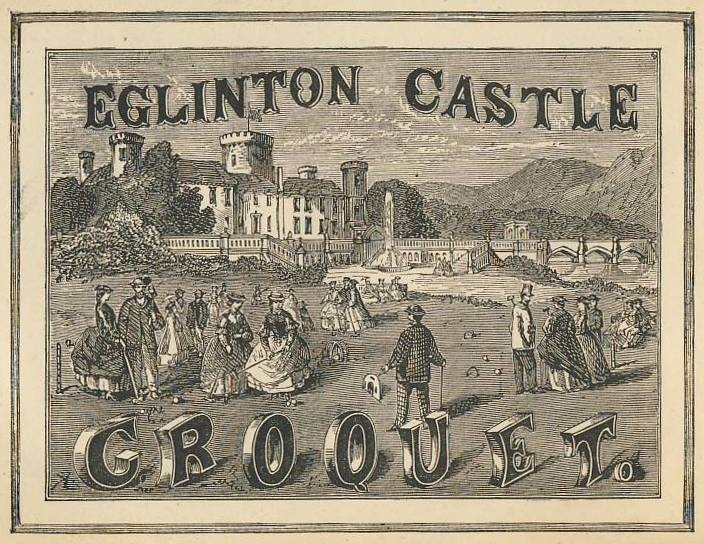
A game of croquet being played at Eglinton Castle, North Ayrshire, in the early 1860s

The earliest known reference to croquet in Scotland is the booklet The Game of Croquet, its Laws and Regulations, which was published in the mid-1860s for the proprietor of Eglinton Castle, the Earl of Eglinton. On the page facing the title page is a picture of Eglinton Castle with a game of "croquet" in full swing.

The croquet lawn existed on the northern terrace, between Eglinton Castle and the Lugton Water. The 13th Earl developed a variation on croquet named Captain Moreton's Eglinton Castle croquet, which had small bells on the eight hoops "to ring the changes", two pegs, a double hoop with a bell, and two tunnels for the ball to pass through. In 1865, the 'Rules of the Eglinton Castle and Cassiobury Croquet' was published by Edmund Routledge. Several incomplete sets of this form of croquet are known to exist, and one complete set is still used for demonstration games in the West of Scotland.

== Glossary of terms ==
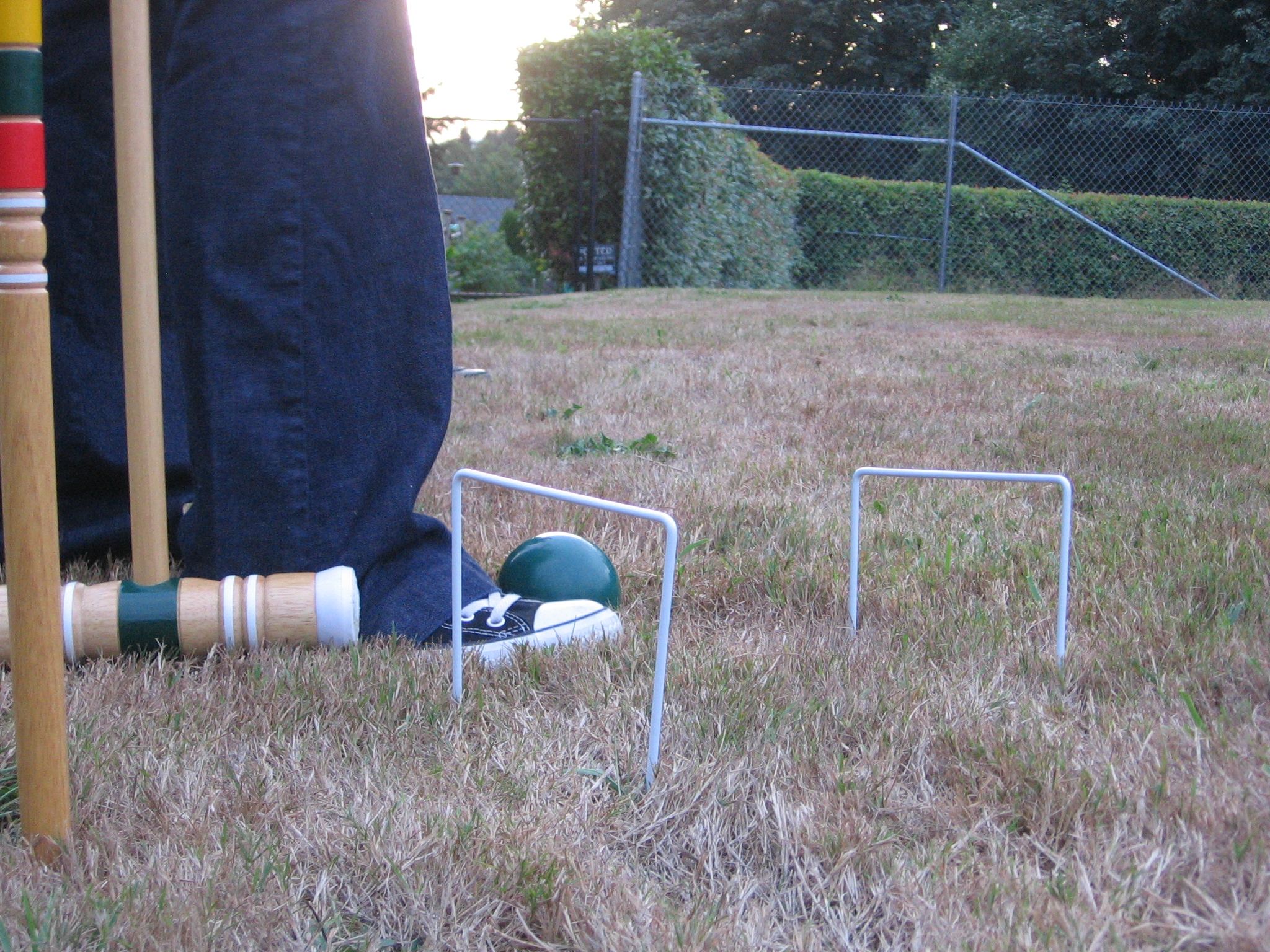
Backyard croquet being played in rough grass with inexpensive equipment, Pacific Northwest, August 2009

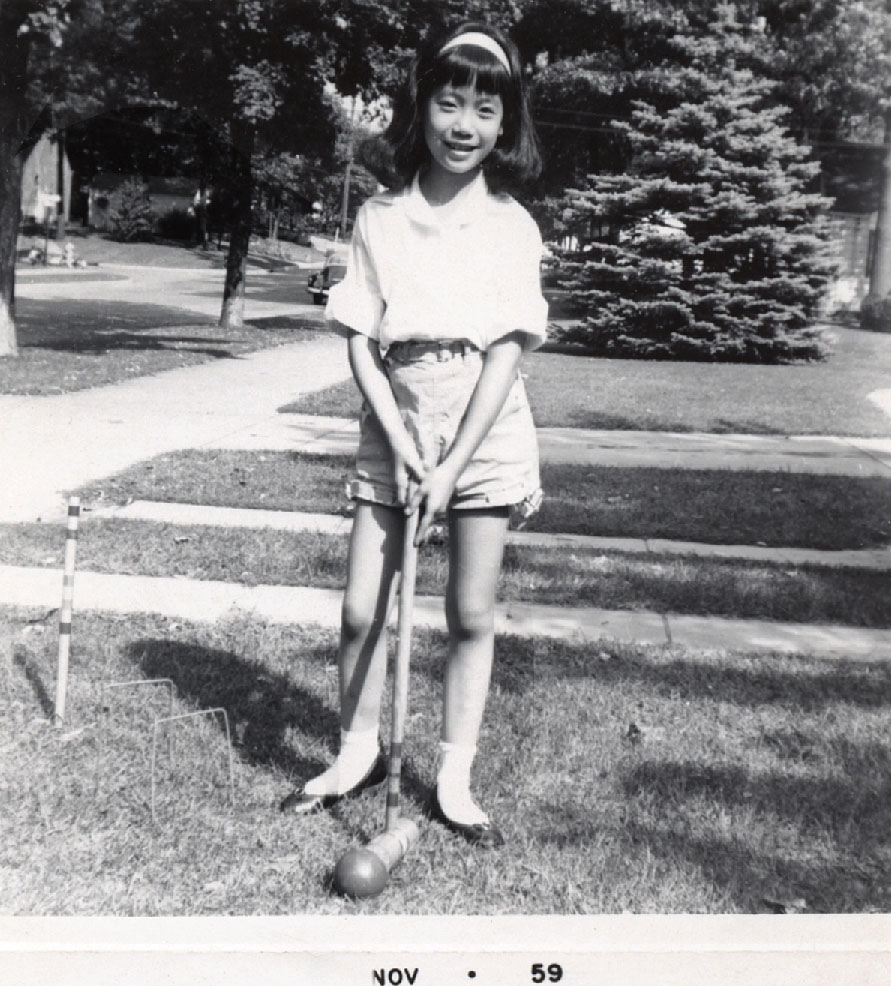
Croquet player in a front yard in Grand Rapids, Michigan, 1959

Backward ball
The ball of a side that has scored fewer hoops (compare with 'forward ball')
Ball-in-hand
A ball that the striker can pick up to change its position, for example:
1. Any ball when it leaves the court has to be replaced on the yard-line
2. The striker's ball after making a roquet must be placed in contact with the roqueted ball
3. The striker's ball when the striker is entitled to a lift
Ball in play
A ball after it has been played into the game, which is not a ball in hand or pegged out
Baulk
An imaginary line on which a ball is placed for its first shot in the game, or when taking a lift: The A-baulk coincides with the western half of the yard line along the south boundary; the B-baulk occupies the eastern half of the north boundary yard line.
Bisque, half-bisque
A bisque is a free turn in a handicap match. A half-bisque is a restricted handicap turn in which no point may be scored.
Break down
To end a turn by making a mistake
Cannon
In association croquet, a shot which results after a roqueted ball comes to rest in contact with another ball on the lawn: The laws allow for this third ball to also be moved on the resulting croquet stroke, staying in touch with the roqueted ball (on which the striker is now ball-in-hand). The croquet stroke with the three balls in contact is referred to as a "cannon".
Continuation stroke
Either the bonus stroke played after running a hoop in order or the second bonus stroke played after making a roquet
Corner cannon
In association croquet, a cannon taken from a corner of the court : Corner cannons occur a good deal more frequently than other cannons because skilled players seek them out as a way of getting a ball out of a corner and into a break. The corner is a fairly large target into which to rush and set up a corner cannon.
Croquet stroke
A stroke taken after making a roquet, in which the striker's ball and the roqueted ball are placed together in contact
Crush
a crush is a fault that happens when mallet, ball, hoop are all in simultaneous contact during a stroke />
Double tap
A fault in which the mallet makes more than one audible sound when it strikes the ball
Double banking
The practice of playing 2 games of croquet simultaneously on the same lawn/court : This is done by using primary colours and secondary colours. When the two games impinge on each other players mark the balls to allow the other game to proceed.
Dolly rush
A rush with a very short distance (a foot or less) between the balls; a dolly rush is easy to control and is generally considered quite desirable
Forward ball
The ball of a player or team that has scored more hoops (compare with 'backward ball')
Hit in
To make a roquet, usually at distance, which starts a break
Hoop
Metal (inverted) U-shaped gate inserted into ground (also called a wicket in the US, which is of the same etymology as wicket gate)
Leave
The position of the balls after a successful break, in which a player leaves the balls placed so as to make life as difficult as possible for the opponent and/or easy for themselves on the next turn if the opponent misses
Lift
A turn in which the player is entitled to remove the ball from its current position and play instead from either baulk line; a lift is permitted when a ball has been placed by the opponent in a position where it is wired from all other balls, and also in advanced play when the opponent has completed a break that includes hoops 1-back or 4-back
Object ball
A ball which is going to be rushed
Peg out
To cause a rover ball to strike the peg and conclude its active involvement in the game
Peel
To send a ball other than the striker's ball through its next hoop in order
Pioneer
A ball placed in a strategic position near the striker's next-but-one or next-but-two hoop, to assist in running that hoop later in the break
Primary colours or first colours
The main croquet ball colours used are blue, red, black and yellow. One player or team plays blue and black, the other red and yellow.
Push
A fault when the mallet pushes the striker's ball with an extended contact, rather than making a clean strike
Roquet
(Second syllable rhymes with "play") : When the striker's ball hits a ball with which the player is entitled to then take a croquet shot, it is a roquet. At the start of a turn, the striker is entitled to roquet all the other three balls once. Once the striker's ball goes through its target hoop, the player is again entitled to roquet the other balls once.
Rover ball
A ball that has run all 12 hoops in order, and can therefore be pegged out
Rover hoop
The last hoop, indicated by a red top bar; the first hoop has a blue top
Run a hoop
To send the striker's ball through a hoop; if the hoop is the hoop in order for the striker's ball, the striker earns a bonus stroke
Rush
A roquet when the roqueted ball is sent to a specific position on the court, such as the next hoop for the striker's ball or close to a ball that the striker wishes to roquet next.
Scatter shot
A continuation stroke used to hit a ball which may not be roqueted in order to send it to a less dangerous position
Secondary colours
(Also known as second colours or alternate colours): The colours of the balls used in the second game played on the same court in double-banking are green, pink, brown and white. Green and brown versus pink and white, are played by the same player or pair.
Sextuple peel (SXP)
To peel the partner ball through its last six hoops in the course of a single turn; very few players have achieved this feat, but it is being seen increasingly at championship level
Tice
A ball sent to a location that will entice an opponent to shoot at it but miss
Triple peel (TP)
To send a partner ball through its last three hoops, and then peg out both partner ball and striker's ball, in the course of a single turn; see also Triple Peel : A variant is the Triple Peel on Opponent (TPO), where the opponent's ball, rather than the partner ball, is peeled. The significance of this manoeuvre is that in advanced play, making a break that includes the tenth hoop (called 4-back) is penalized by granting the opponent a lift (entitling him to take the next shot from either baulk line). Therefore, many breaks stop voluntarily with three hoops and the peg still to run.
Wired
When a hoop or the peg impedes the path of a striker's ball, or the swing of the mallet, a player will often endeavour to finish a turn with the opponent's balls wired from each other.
Yard line
An imaginary line one yard (0.91 m) from the boundary; balls which go off the boundary are generally replaced on the yard line (but if this happens on a croquet stroke, the turn ends)

== In art and literature ==
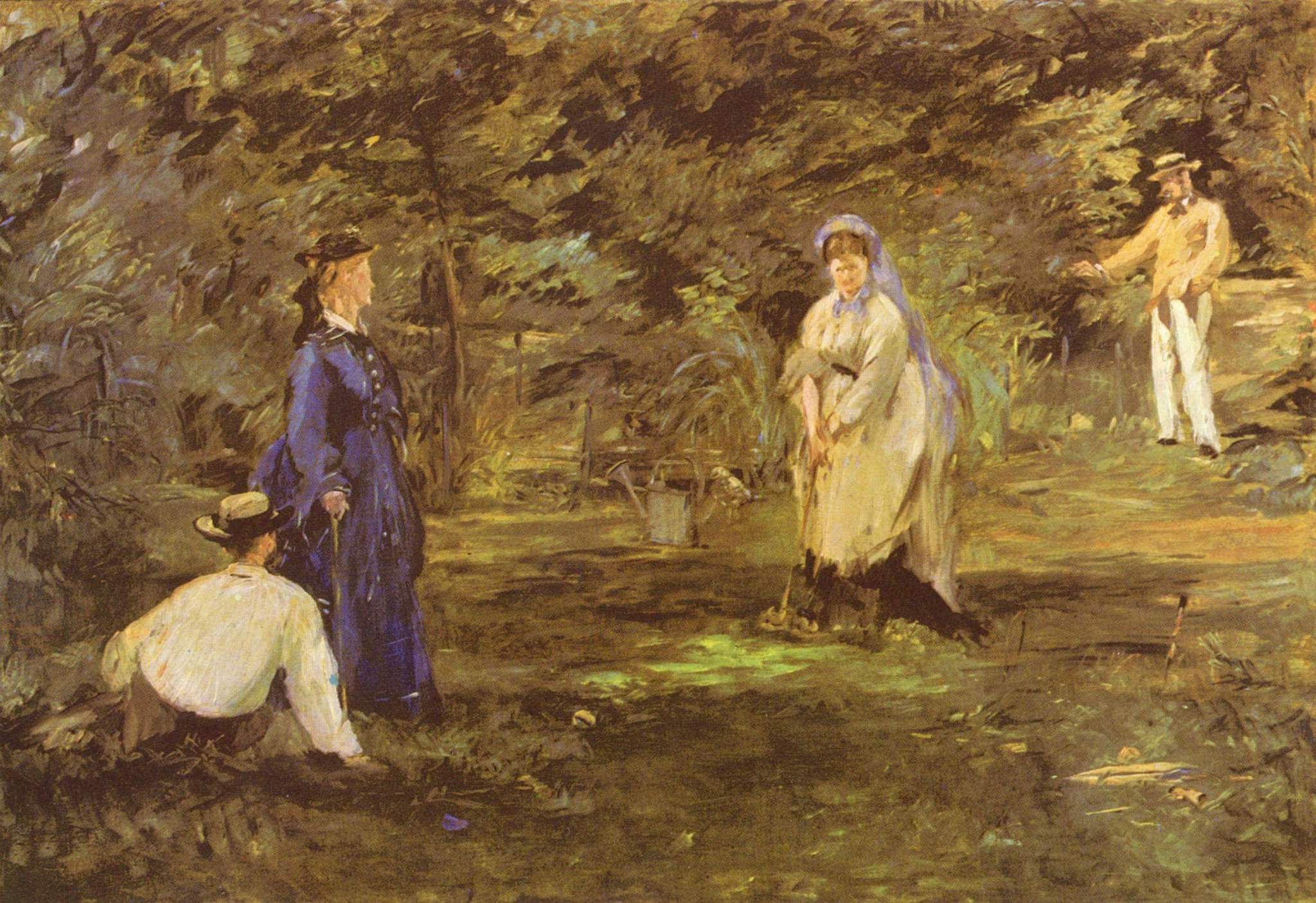
The Croquet Game, Édouard Manet, 1873

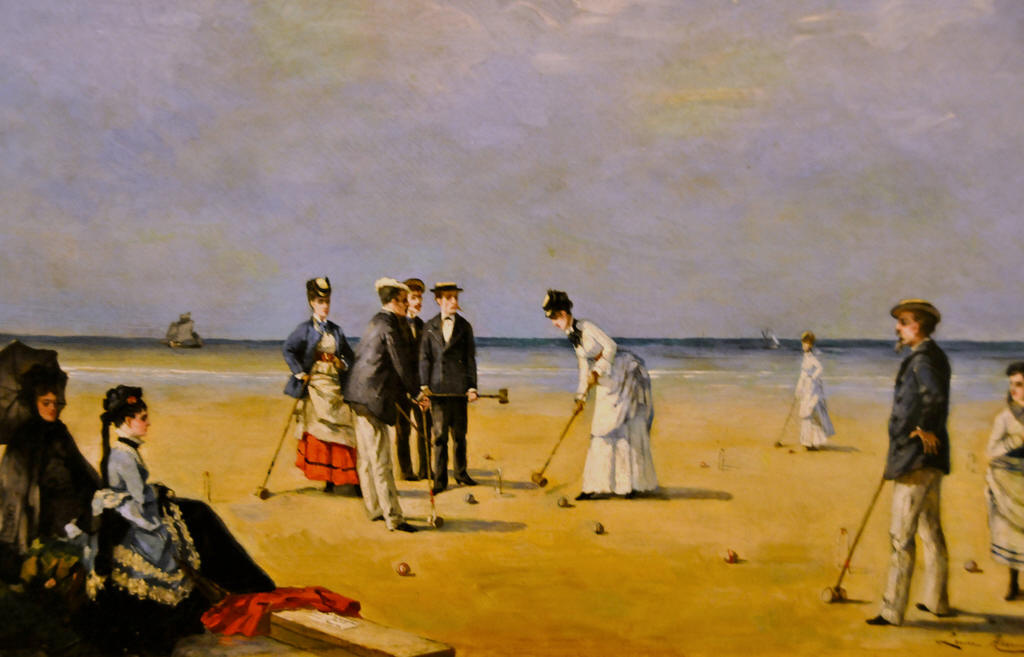
Louise Abbéma, A Game of Croquet (Trouville, 1872), private collection

Croquet is popularly believed to be viciously competitive. That may derive from the fact that (unlike in golf) players will often attempt to move their opponents' balls to unfavourable positions. However, purely negative play is rarely a winning strategy; successful players (in all versions other than golf croquet) will use all four balls to set up a break for themselves, rather than simply making the game as difficult as possible for their opponents.

The way croquet is depicted in paintings and books says much about popular perceptions of the game, though little about the reality of modern play.

- In 1868 a song titled "Croquet" (essentially anonymous: by M. B. C. S. and W. O. F.) was included in a popular song book by W. O. Perkins, The Golden Robin (Pub. Oliver Ditson & Company, New York). ("Upon the smoothly shaven lawn, Beneath the skies of May, Oh, boys and girls, this merry morn, Come out and play Croquet ..."); there are four full verses.
- Winslow Homer, Édouard Manet, and Pierre Bonnard all have paintings titled The Croquet Game.
- Norman Rockwell often depicted the game, including in his painting Croquet.
- Edward Gorey's The Epiplectic Bicycle features illustrations of the main characters playing with croquet mallets.
- Croquet is popular pastime of Leo Tolstoy's Anna Karenina characters.
- H. G. Wells wrote The Croquet Player which uses croquet as a metaphor for the way in which people confront the very problem of their own existence.

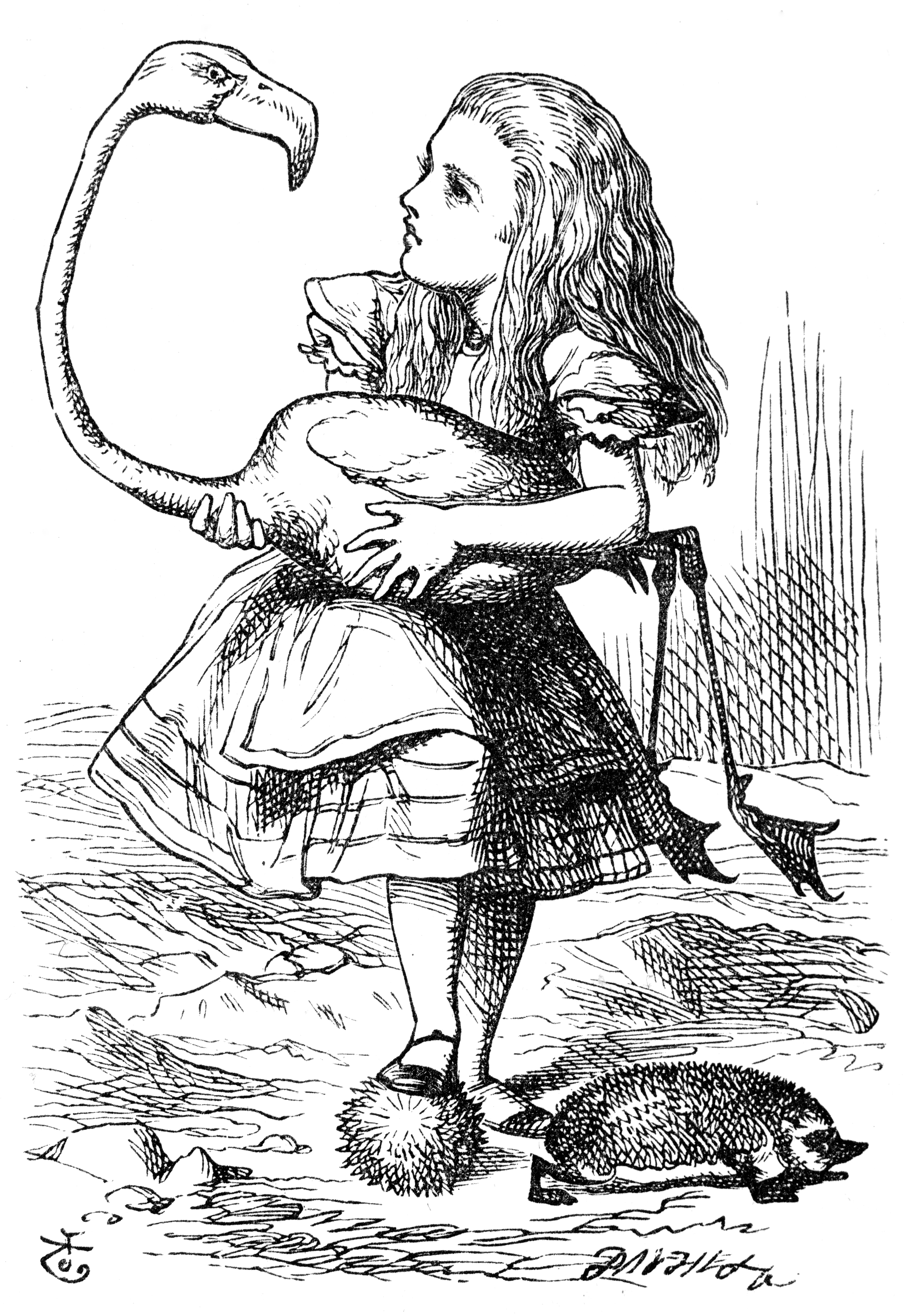
Alice trying to play croquet with a flamingo in Alice's Adventures in Wonderland (1865)

- Lewis Carroll featured a nonsense version of the game in the popular children's novel Alice's Adventures in Wonderland: a hedgehog was used as the ball, a flamingo as the mallet, and playing cards as the hoops.
- In the Thursday Next series of novels, notably Something Rotten, Jasper Fforde depicts an alternative world in which croquet is a brutal mass spectator sport.
- The cover of the 1971 Genesis album Nursery Cryme shows Cynthia, a character in the song "Musical Box" holding a croquet mallet with a few heads on the playing field including another character of the song Henry's head that she removed with said mallet.
- In Stephen King's 1977 novel The Shining, the main character, Jack Torrance, uses a croquet mallet to chase and attack the other characters. The 1997 miniseries features the use of croquet however, Stanley Kubrick's 1980 film adaptation uses a fire axe instead.
- In the 1980s geography game Where in the World Is Carmen Sandiego?, one of the characters, Fast Eddie B, is described as a "world class croquet player", and two other gang members, Ihor Ihorovich and Scar Graynolt, also play the sport.
- In the 1988 film Heathers, Veronica (Winona Ryder) and her friends, the Heathers, are depicted as playing croquet, though at the beginning, the Heathers are playing croquet to hit Veronica on the head. Croquet mallets also feature in the publicity posters for Heathers: The Musical.
- Croquet is featured prominently in the music video for "I'm Not Okay (I Promise)" by My Chemical Romance.
- Croquet is featured in the novel Grapes of Wrath by John Steinbeck wherein the Joads stay at the government camp in Weedpatch, Ca.
- In the 1951 Woody Woodpecker animated short Wicket Wacky, Woody sneaks into a croquet field to play, while a gopher bothered by the noise tries to stop him.

== Clubs ==
About 200 croquet clubs across the United States are members of the United States Croquet Association.

Many colleges have croquet clubs as well, such as The University of Virginia, The University of Chicago, Pennsylvania State University, Bates College, SUNY New Paltz, Harvard University, and Dartmouth College. Notably, St. John's College and the US Naval Academy engage in a yearly match in Annapolis, Maryland. Both schools also compete at the collegiate level and the rivalry continues to be an Annapolis tradition, attracting thousands of spectators each April.

In England and Wales, there are over 200 clubs affiliated with Croquet England. The All England Lawn Tennis and Croquet Club at Wimbledon is famous for its lawn tennis tournament, but retains an active croquet section. There are clubs in many universities and colleges, with an annual varsity match being played between Oxford and Cambridge. With over 1800 participants, the 2011 Oxford University "Cuppers" (inter-college) tournament claimed to be not only the largest croquet tournament ever, but the largest sporting event in the university's history.

Australia has croquet clubs in every state with about 10,000 players. Croquet Australia is the national body with each State having its own Association.

In Spain there are 37 clubs federated to the Federación Española de Croquet. Croquet is a growing sport in Spain with four new clubs joining the FEC in 2024.

There are 112 clubs in New Zealand, affiliated with 19 associations. They are governed by Croquet New Zealand.

== See also ==
- Croquet Hall of Fame
- Jaques of London
- Roque
- US intercollegiate croquet champions
- Woodball
