= Green Gables =

Green Gables may refer to:

== Homes ==
- Green Gables (Melbourne, Florida), a historic home
- Mortimer Fleishhacker House in Woodside, California, also called Green Gables
- Green Gables (Prince Edward Island), a 19th-century farmhouse, setting of the novel Anne of Green Gables

== Other ==
- Green Gables (Palo Alto, California), a 1950s subdivision and neighborhood
- Green Gables Croquet Club, Spring Lake, New Jersey
- Needs Convenience, a chain of convenience stores formerly known as "Green Gables"

== See also ==
- Anne of Green Gables, a 1908 novel by Lucy Maud Montgomery set on Prince Edward Island
