= Mary Astor =

American actress (1906–1987)

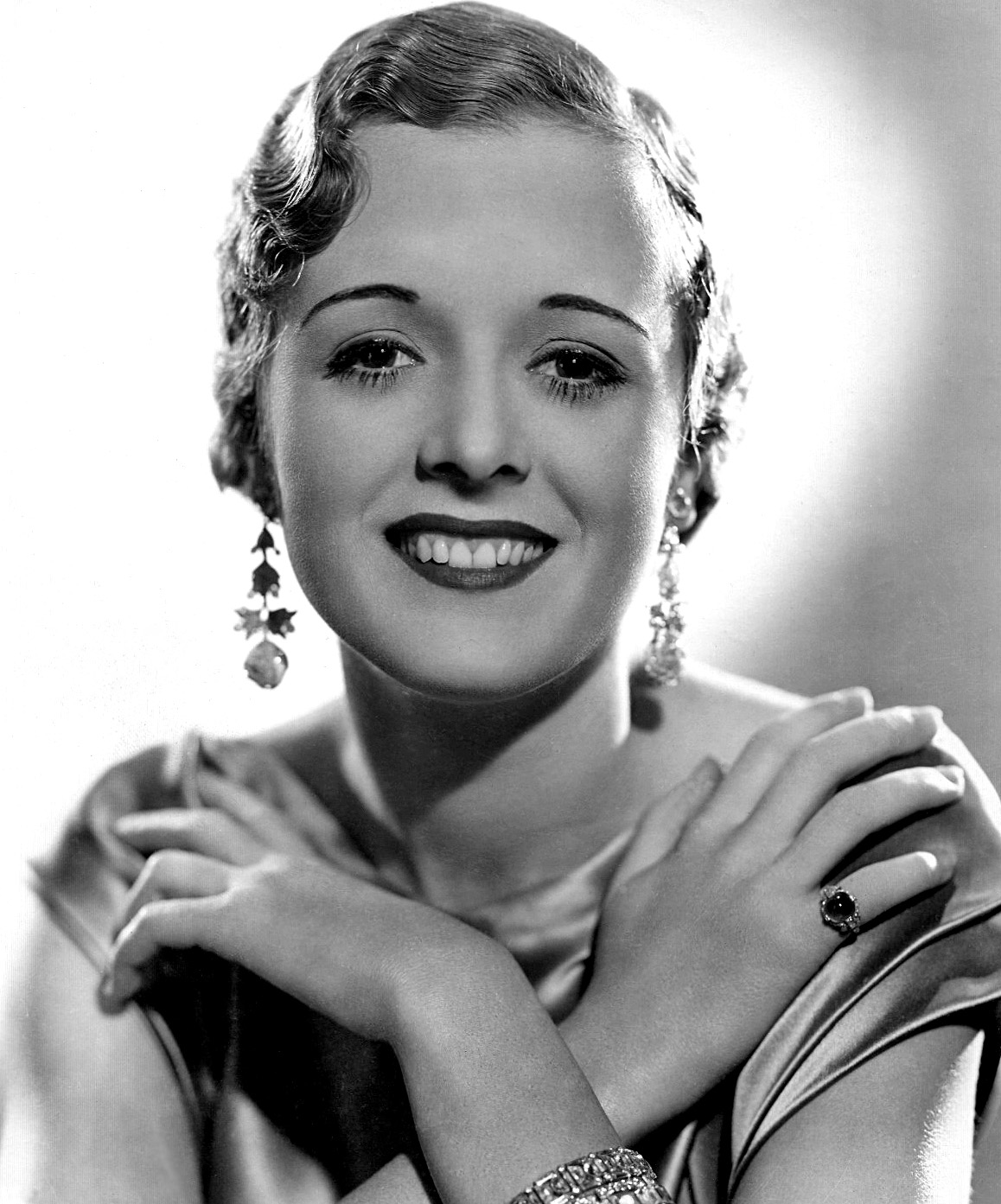
- Astor in 1933
- Born: Lucile Vasconcellos Langhanke; May 3, 1906; Quincy, Illinois, U.S.
- Died: September 25, 1987 (aged 81); Los Angeles, California, U.S.
- Resting place: Holy Cross Cemetery
- Occupation: Actress
- Years active: 1921–1964
- Spouses: Kenneth Hawks (m. 1928; died 1930) Franklyn Thorpe (m. 1931; div. 1935) Manuel del Campo (m. 1936; div. 1941) Thomas Gordon Wheelock (m. 1945; div. 1955)
- Children: 2
- Relatives: Howard Hawks (brother-in-law); William Hawks (brother-in-law); Bessie Love (sister-in-law); Athole Shearer (sister-in-law)
- Awards: Hollywood Walk of Fame

Mary Astor (born Lucile Vasconcellos Langhanke; May 3, 1906 – September 25, 1987) was an American actress. Although her career spanned several decades, she may be best remembered for her performance as Brigid O'Shaughnessy in The Maltese Falcon (1941).

Astor began her long motion picture career when a teenager in the silent movies of the early 1920s. When talkies arrived, her voice was initially considered too masculine and she was off the screen for a year. After she appeared in a play with her friend Florence Eldridge, film offers returned, and she resumed her career in sound pictures.

In 1936, Astor's career was nearly destroyed by scandal. She had an affair with the playwright George S. Kaufman and was branded an adulterous wife by her former husband during a custody fight over their daughter. Overcoming these stumbling blocks in her private life, she went on to greater film success, eventually winning an Academy Award for Best Supporting Actress for her portrayal of the concert pianist Sandra Kovak in The Great Lie (1941).

Astor was a Metro-Goldwyn-Mayer contract player through most of the 1940s and continued to work in film, television and on stage until her retirement in 1964. She authored five novels. Her autobiography was a bestseller, as was her later book, A Life on Film, which was about her career.

The director Lindsay Anderson wrote of Astor in 1990 that when "two or three who love the cinema are gathered together, the name of Mary Astor always comes up, and everybody agrees that she was an actress of special attraction, whose qualities of depth and reality always seemed to illuminate the parts she played."

== Life and career ==
Astor was born in Quincy, Illinois, the only child of Otto Ludwig Wilhelm Langhanke and Helen Marie de Vasconcellos. Her parents were teachers. Her German father immigrated to the United States from Berlin in 1891 and became a naturalized U.S. citizen; her American mother was born in Jacksonville, Illinois, and had Portuguese roots. They married on August 3, 1904, in Lyons, Kansas.

Astor's father taught German at Quincy High School until the U.S. entered World War I. Later on, he took up light farming. Astor's mother, who had always wanted to be an actress, taught drama and elocution. Astor was home-schooled in academics and was taught to play the piano by her father, who insisted she practice daily. Her piano talents came in handy when she played piano in her films The Great Lie and Meet Me in St. Louis.

In 1919, Astor sent a photograph of herself to a beauty contest in Motion Picture Magazine, becoming a semifinalist. When Astor was 15, the family moved to Chicago, Illinois, with her father teaching German in public schools. Astor took drama lessons and appeared in various amateur stage productions. The following year, she sent another photograph to Motion Picture Magazine, this time becoming a finalist and then runner-up in the national contest. Her father then moved the family to New York City, in order for his daughter to act in motion pictures. He managed her affairs from September 1920 to June 1930.

A Manhattan photographer, Charles Albin, saw her photograph and asked the young girl with haunting eyes and long auburn hair whose nickname was "Rusty" to pose for him. The Albin photographs were seen by Harry Durant of Famous Players–Lasky and Astor was signed to a six-month contract with Paramount Pictures. Her name was changed to Mary Astor during a conference among Paramount Pictures chief Jesse Lasky, film producer Walter Wanger, and gossip columnist Louella Parsons.

=== Silent movie career ===
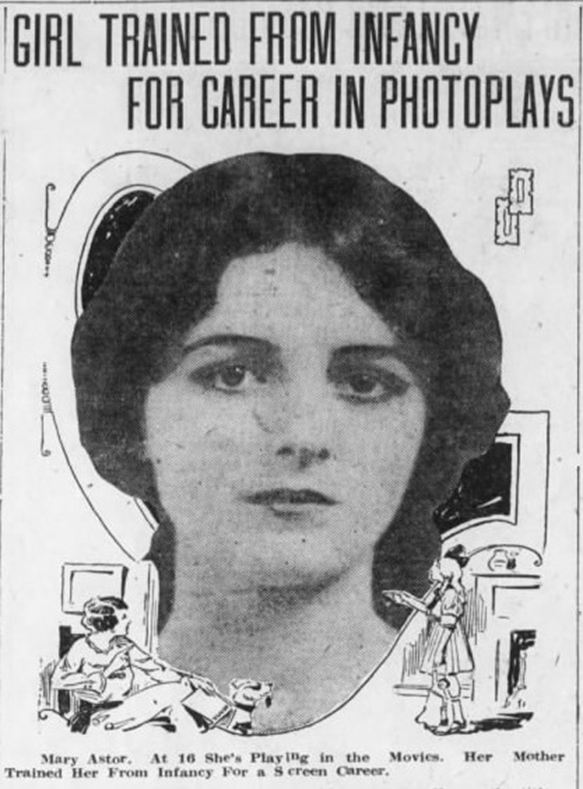
Newspaper clipping, May 19, 1921

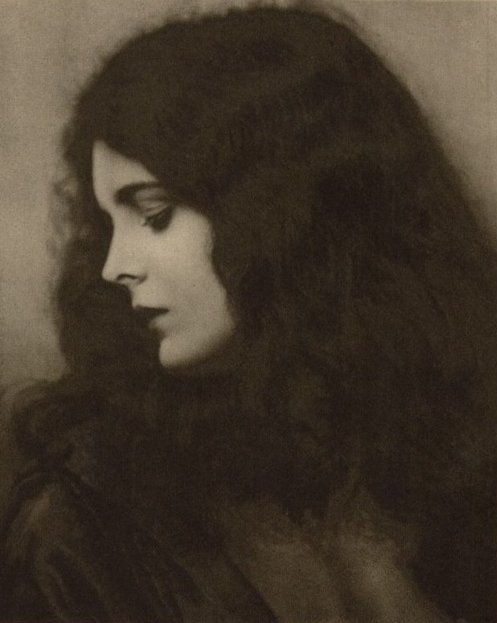
A 1924 publicity photo of Astor from Stars of the Photoplay

Astor's first screen test was directed by Lillian Gish, who was so impressed with her recitation of Shakespeare that she shot a thousand feet of film with her.

She made her debut at age 14 in the 1921 film Sentimental Tommy, but her small part in a dream sequence wound up on the cutting room floor. Paramount let her contract lapse. She then appeared in some movie shorts with sequences based on famous paintings. She received critical recognition for the 1921 two-reeler The Beggar Maid. Her first feature-length movie was John Smith (1922), followed that same year by The Man Who Played God. In 1923, she and her parents moved to Hollywood.

After appearing in several larger roles at various studios, she was again signed by Paramount, this time to a one-year contract at $500 a week. After she appeared in several more movies, John Barrymore saw her photograph in a magazine and wanted her cast in his upcoming movie. On loan-out to Warner Bros., she starred with him in Beau Brummel (1924). The older actor wooed the young actress, but their relationship was severely constrained by Astor's parents' unwillingness to let the couple spend time alone together; Mary was only seventeen and underage. It was only after Barrymore convinced the Langhankes that his acting lessons required privacy that the couple managed to be alone at all. Their secret engagement ended largely because of the Langhankes' interference and Astor's inability to escape their heavy-handed authority, and because Barrymore became involved with Astor's fellow WAMPAS Baby Star Dolores Costello, whom he later married.

In 1925, Astor's parents bought a Moorish style mansion with 1 acre (4,000 m^{2}) of land known as "Moorcrest" in the hills above Hollywood. The Langhankes not only lived lavishly off of Astor's earnings, but kept her a virtual prisoner inside Moorcrest. Moorcrest is known not only for its ornate style, but its place as the most lavish residence associated with the Krotona Colony, a utopian society founded by the Theosophical Society in 1912.

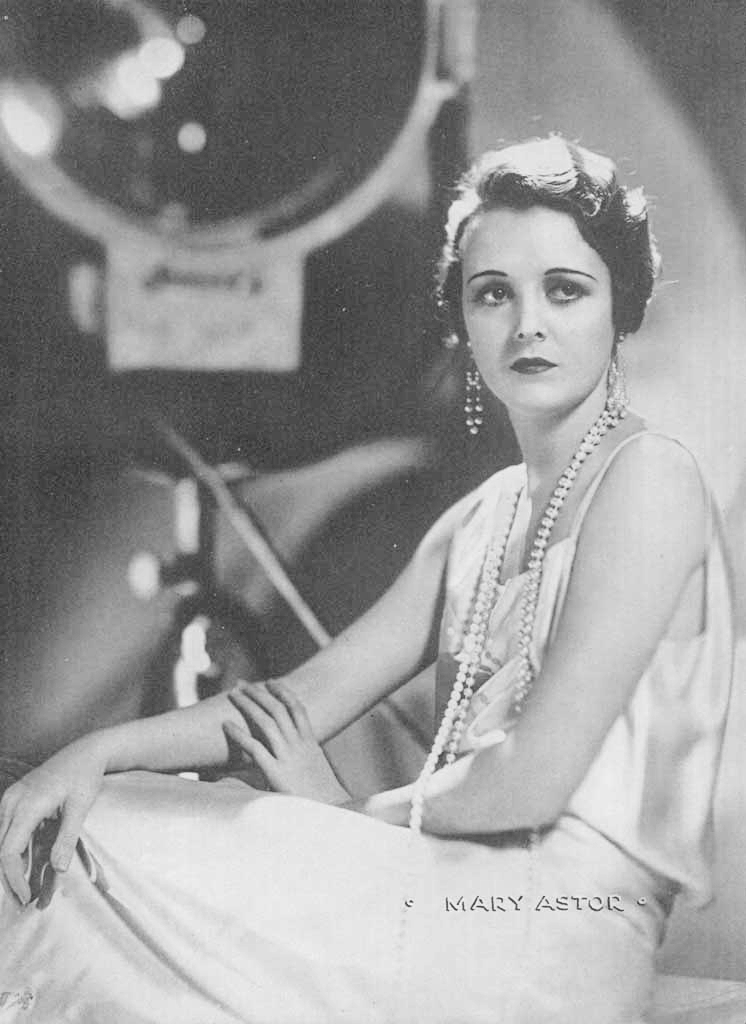
A 1931 publicity photo of Astor for Argentinean Magazine

Astor's parents were not Theosophists, though the family was friendly with both Marie Hotchener and her husband Harry, prominent Theosophical Society members. Hotchener negotiated Astor's right to a $5 a week allowance (at a time when she was making $2,500 a week) and the right to go to work unchaperoned by her mother. The following year when she was 19, Astor, fed up with her father's constant physical and psychological abuse as well as his control of her money, climbed from her second floor bedroom window and escaped to a hotel in Hollywood, as recounted in her memoirs. Hotchener facilitated her return by persuading Otto Langhanke to give Astor a savings account with $500 and the freedom to come and go as she pleased. Nevertheless, Astor did not gain control of her salary until she was 26 years old, at which point her parents sued her for financial support. Astor settled the case by agreeing to pay her parents $100 a month.

Astor continued to appear in movies at various studios. When her Paramount contract ended in 1925, she was signed at Warner Bros. Among her assignments was another role with John Barrymore, this time in Don Juan (1926). She was named one of the WAMPAS Baby Stars in 1926, along with Mary Brian, Dolores Costello, Joan Crawford, Dolores del Río, Janet Gaynor, and Fay Wray. On loan to Fox Film Corporation, Astor starred in Dressed to Kill (1928), which received good reviews, and the sophisticated comedy Dry Martini (also 1928). She later said that, while working on the latter, she "absorbed and assumed something of the atmosphere and emotional climate of the picture." She said it offered "a new and exciting point of view; with its specious doctrine of self-indulgence, it rushed into the vacuum of my moral sense and captivated me completely." When her Warner Bros. contract ended, she signed a contract with Fox for $3,750 a week. In 1928, she married director Kenneth Hawks at her family home, Moorcrest. He gave her a Packard automobile as a wedding present and the couple moved into a home high up on Lookout Mountain, Los Angeles above Beverly Hills. As the film industry made the transition to talkies, Fox gave her a sound test, which she failed because the studio found her voice to be too deep. Though this result was probably due to early sound equipment and inexperienced technicians, the studio released her from her contract and she found herself out of work for eight months in 1929.

=== New beginnings ===
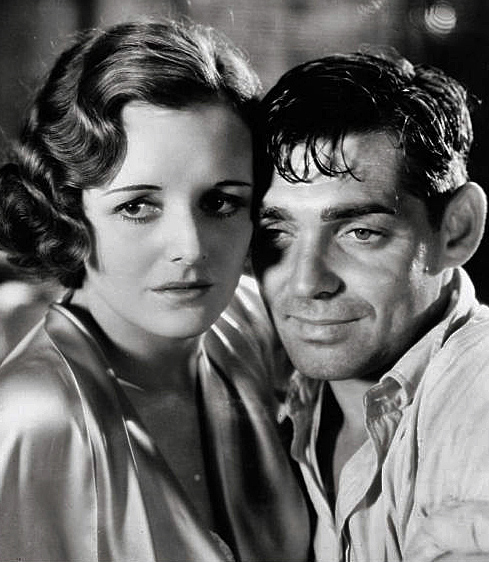
With Clark Gable in Red Dust (1932)

During her time off, Astor took voice training and singing lessons with Francis Stuart, an exponent of Francesco Lamperti, but no roles were offered. Her acting career was then given a boost by her friend, Florence Eldridge, (wife of Fredric March), in whom she confided. Eldridge, who was to star in the stage play Among the Married at the Majestic Theatre in Downtown Los Angeles, recommended Astor for the second female lead. The play was a success, and her voice was deemed suitable, being described as low and vibrant. She was happy to work again, but her happiness soon ended. On January 2, 1930, while filming sequences for the Fox movie Such Men Are Dangerous, Kenneth Hawks was killed in a mid-air plane crash over the Pacific. Astor had just finished a matinee performance at the Majestic when Florence Eldridge gave her the news. She was rushed from the theatre to Eldridge's apartment. A replacement, Doris Lloyd, stepped in for the next show. Astor remained with Eldridge at her apartment for some time, then soon returned to work.

Shortly after her husband's death, she debuted in her first talkie, Ladies Love Brutes (1930) at Paramount, in which she co-starred with her friend Fredric March. While her career picked up, her private life remained difficult. After working on several more movies, she suffered delayed shock over her husband's death and had a nervous breakdown. During the months of her illness, she was attended to by Dr. Franklyn Thorpe, whom she married on June 29, 1931. That year, she starred as Nancy Gibson in Smart Woman, playing a woman determined to retrieve her husband from a gold-digging flirtation.

In May 1932, the Thorpes purchased a yacht and sailed to Hawaii. Astor was expecting a baby in August, but gave birth in June in Honolulu. The child, a daughter, was named Marylyn Hauoli Thorpe: her first name combined her parents' names, and her middle name is Hawaiian (Hau'oli is a Hawaiian word that means joyful, happy, full of delight). When they returned to Southern California, Astor freelanced and gained the pivotal role of Barbara Willis in MGM's Red Dust (1932) with Clark Gable and Jean Harlow. In late 1932, Astor signed a featured player contract with Warner Bros. Meanwhile, besides spending lavishly, her parents invested in the stock market, which often turned out unprofitable. While they remained in Moorcrest, Astor dubbed it a "white elephant," and she refused to maintain the house. She had to turn to the Motion Picture Relief Fund in 1933 to pay her bills. She appeared as the female lead, Hilda Lake, niece of the murder victims, in The Kennel Murder Case (1933), co-starring with William Powell as detective Philo Vance. Film critic William K. Everson pronounced it a "masterpiece" in the August 1984 issue of Films in Review.

Soon unhappy with her marriage, due to Thorpe having a short temper and a habit of listing her faults, by 1933 Astor wanted a divorce. At a friend's suggestion, she took a break from movie-making in 1933 and visited New York alone. While there, enjoying a whirlwind social life, she met the playwright George S. Kaufman, who was in a strong, but open marriage. She documented their affair in her diary. Thorpe, by now making use of his wife's income, discovered Astor's diary, and told Astor that her liaisons with other men, including Kaufman, would be used in any divorce proceeding to support the charge that she was an unfit mother.

=== Custody case ===
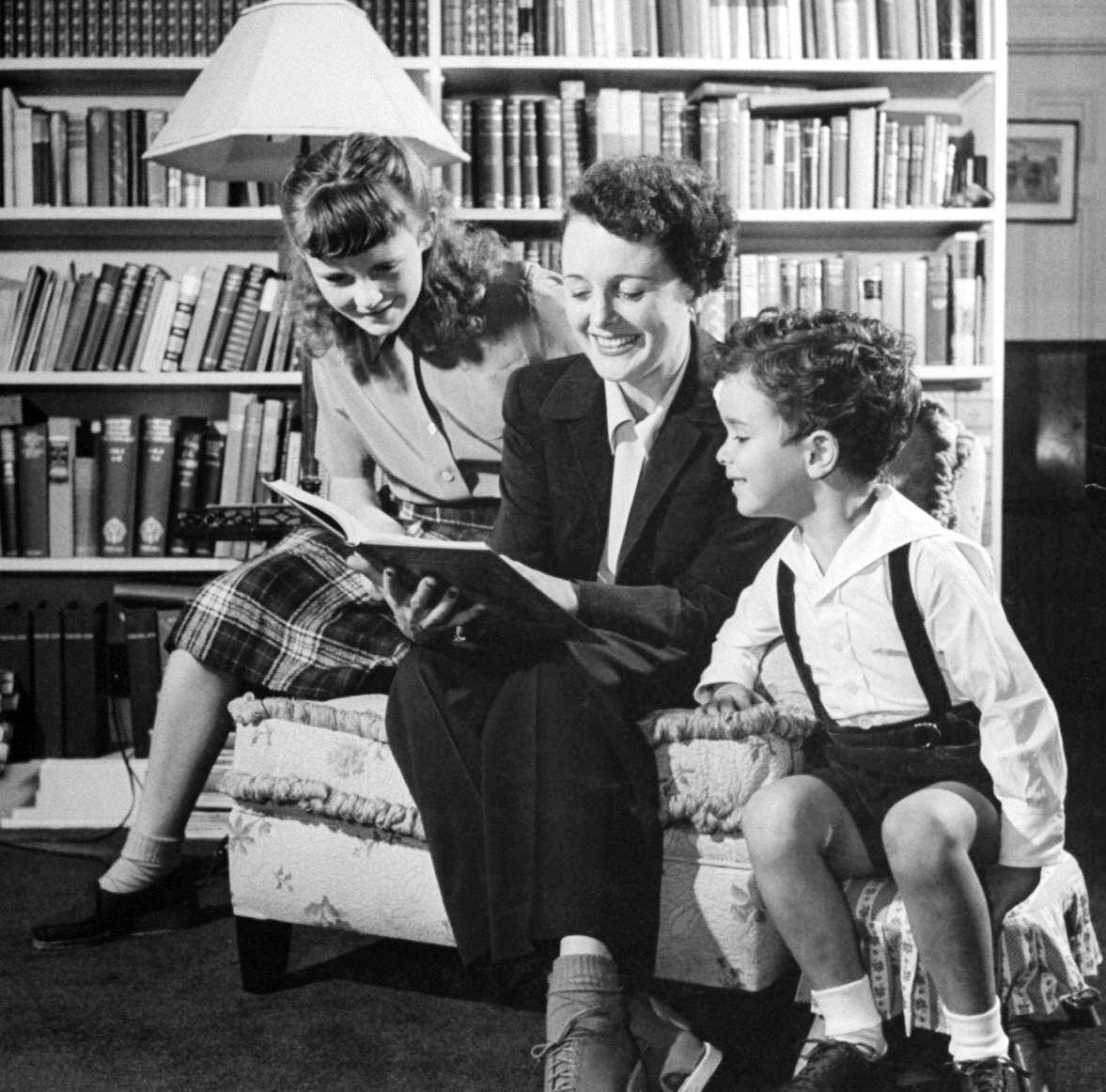
Astor with her daughter, Marylyn Thorpe, and her son, Anthony del Campo (1944)

Thorpe divorced Astor in April 1935. A custody battle over their four-year-old daughter, Marylyn, drew press attention to Astor in 1936. Astor's diary was never formally offered as evidence during the trial, but Thorpe and his lawyers constantly referred to it, and its notoriety grew. Astor admitted that the diary existed and that she had documented her affair with Kaufman, but maintained that many of the parts that had been referred to were forgeries, following the theft of the diary from her desk. The diary was deemed inadmissible as a mutilated document because Thorpe had removed pages referring to himself and had fabricated content. The trial judge, Goodwin J. Knight, ordered it sealed and impounded. Florabel Muir, then with the New York Daily News, is known to have invented fabricated diary passages in her articles.

News of the diary became public when Astor's role in Dodsworth (1936), as Edith Cortwright, was beginning to be filmed. Producer Samuel Goldwyn was urged to fire her because her contract included a morals clause. Goldwyn refused. With Walter Huston in the title role, Dodsworth received rave reviews on release, and the public's acceptance assured the studios that casting Astor remained a viable proposition. Ultimately, the scandal caused minimal harm to Astor's career, which was actually revitalized because of the custody fight and the publicity it generated.

In 1952, by court order, Astor's diary was removed from the bank vault where it had been sequestered for 16 years, and was destroyed.

=== Mid-career ===
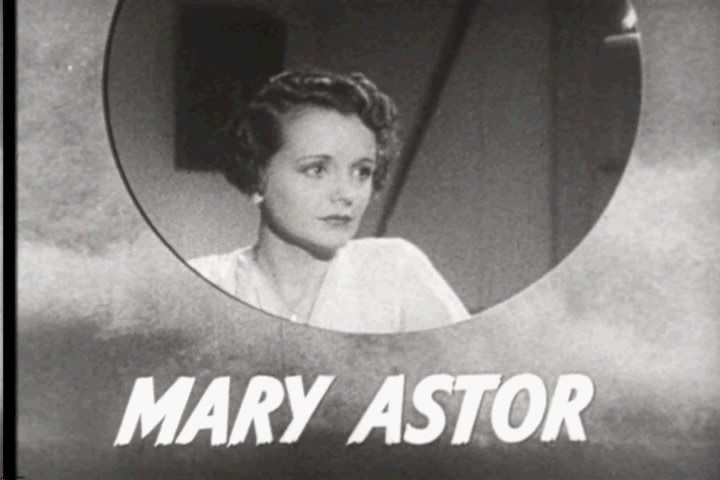
The trailer for The Hurricane (1937)

In 1937, Astor returned to the stage in well-received productions of Noël Coward's Tonight at 8.30, The Astonished Heart, and Still Life. She also began performing regularly on radio. Over the next few years, she had roles on film in The Prisoner of Zenda (1937), John Ford's The Hurricane (1937), Midnight (1939) and Brigham Young (1940). In John Huston’s classic The Maltese Falcon (1941), Astor played scheming temptress Brigid O'Shaughnessy. The film, based on the novel by Dashiell Hammett, also starred Humphrey Bogart and featured Peter Lorre and Sydney Greenstreet. For her performance in The Great Lie (also in 1941) she won an Oscar as Best Supporting Actress in the 14th Academy Awards. As Sandra Kovak, the self-absorbed concert pianist who relinquishes her unborn child, her intermittent love interest was played by George Brent, but the film's star was Bette Davis. Davis wanted Astor cast in the role after watching her screen test and seeing her play Tchaikovsky's Piano Concerto No. 1. She then recruited Astor to collaborate on rewriting the script, which Davis felt was mediocre and needed work to make it more interesting. Astor further followed Davis's advice and sported a bobbed hairdo for the role.

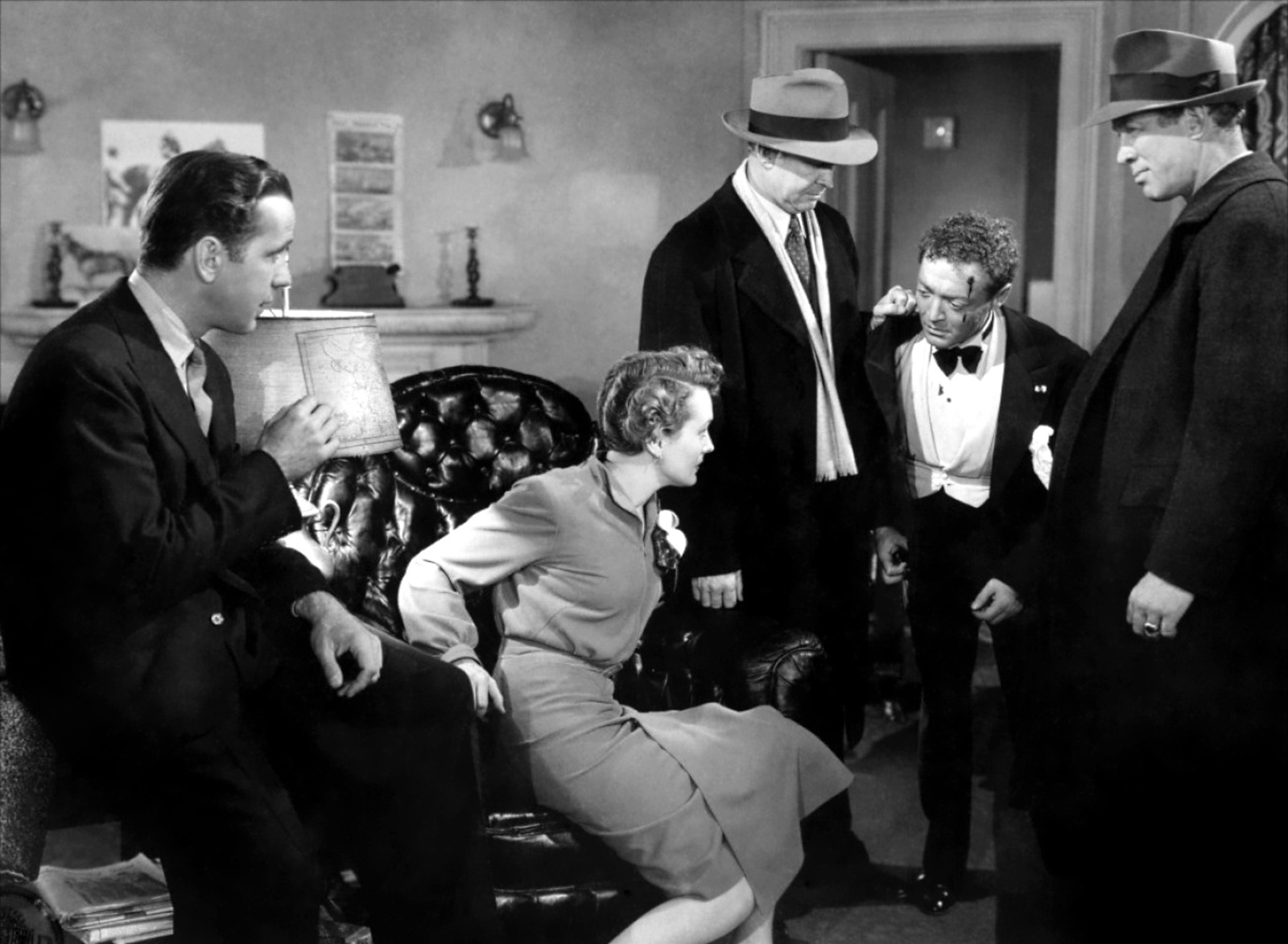
Humphrey Bogart, Mary Astor, Barton MacLane, Peter Lorre and Ward Bond in The Maltese Falcon (1941)

The soundtrack of the movie in the scenes where she plays the concerto, with violent hand movements on the piano keyboard, was dubbed by pianist Max Rabinovitch. Davis deliberately stepped back to allow Astor to shine in her key scenes. In her Oscar acceptance speech, Astor thanked Bette Davis and Tchaikovsky. Astor and Davis became good friends.

Astor was not propelled into the upper echelon of movie stars by these successes, however. She always declined offers to star in her own right. Not wanting the responsibility of top billing and having to carry the picture, she preferred the security of being a featured player. She reunited with Humphrey Bogart and Sydney Greenstreet in John Huston's Across the Pacific (1942). Though usually cast in dramatic or melodramatic roles, Astor showed a flair for comedy as The Princess Centimillia in the Preston Sturges film, The Palm Beach Story (also 1942) for Paramount.

In February 1943, Astor's father, Otto Langhanke, died in Cedars of Lebanon Hospital as a result of a heart attack complicated by influenza. His wife and daughter were at his bedside.

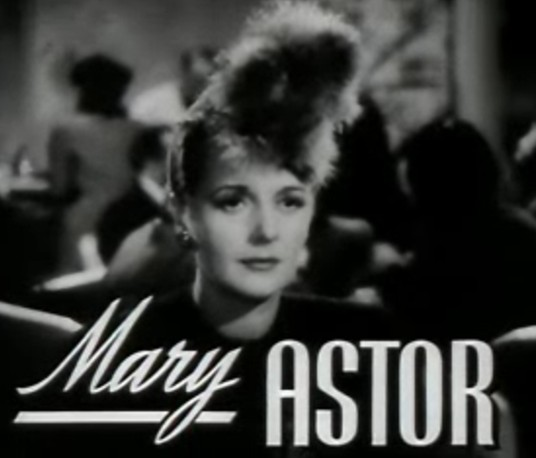
Astor in the trailer for The Great Lie (1941)

That same year, Astor signed a seven-year contract with Metro-Goldwyn-Mayer (MGM), a move she soon came to regret. She was kept busy, playing what appeared to be under-written and largely interchangeable supporting roles, a category Astor later dubbed "Mothers for Metro." After Meet Me in St. Louis (1944), the studio allowed her to debut on Broadway in Many Happy Returns (1945). The play was a failure, but Astor received good reviews. On loan-out to 20th Century Fox, she played a wealthy widow in Claudia and David (1946). She was also loaned to Paramount to play Fritzi Haller in Desert Fury (1947), the tough owner of a saloon and casino in a small mining town.

Before Helen Langhanke died of a heart ailment in January 1947, Astor said she sat in the hospital room with her mother, who was delirious and did not know her, and she listened quietly as her mother told her all about terrible, selfish Lucile, referring to Astor by her birth name. After her death, Astor said she spent countless hours copying her mother's diary so she could read it and was surprised to learn how much she was hated.

At MGM, Astor continued being cast in undistinguished, colorless mother roles. One exception was when she played a prostitute in the film noir Act of Violence (1948). The last straw came when she was cast as Marmee March in Little Women (1949). Astor found no redemption in playing what she considered another humdrum mother and grew despondent. She later described her disappointment with her cast members and the shoot in her memoir A Life on Film:

The girls all giggled and chattered and made a game of every scene. Taylor was engaged, and in love, and talking on the telephone most of the time (which is fine normally, but not when the production clock is ticking away the company's money). June Allyson chewed gum constantly and irritatingly, and Maggie O'Brien looked at me as though she were planning something very unpleasant.

The studio wanted to renew her contract, promising better roles, but she declined the offer.

=== Middle years ===
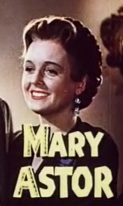
Fiesta (1947)

At the same time, Astor's drinking was growing troublesome. She admitted to alcoholism as far back as the 1930s, but it had never interfered with her work schedule or performance. She hit bottom in 1949 and went into a sanitarium for alcoholics.

In 1951, she made a frantic call to her priest and said that she had taken too many sleeping pills. She was taken to a hospital and the police reported that she had attempted suicide, this being her third overdose in two years. The story made headline news. She maintained it had been an accident.

That same year, she joined Alcoholics Anonymous and converted to Roman Catholicism. She credited her recovery to a priest, Peter Ciklic, also a practicing psychologist, who encouraged her to write about her experiences as part of therapy. She also separated from her fourth husband, Thomas Wheelock (a stockbroker she married on Christmas Day 1945), but did not actually divorce him until 1955.

In 1952, she was cast in the leading role of the play The Time of the Cuckoo, which was later made into the movie Summertime (1955), and subsequently toured with it. After the tour, Astor lived in New York for four years and worked in the theater and on television.

Her TV debut was in The Missing Years (1954) for Kraft Television Theatre. She acted frequently in TV during the ensuing years and appeared on many big shows of the time, including The United States Steel Hour, Alfred Hitchcock Presents, Rawhide, Dr. Kildare, Burke's Law, and Ben Casey. In 1954, she appeared in the episode "Fearful Hour" of the Gary Merrill NBC series Justice in the role of a desperately poor and aging film star who attempts suicide to avoid exposure as a thief. She also played an ex-film star on the Boris Karloff-hosted Thriller in an episode titled "Rose's Last Summer."

Astor starred on Broadway again in The Starcross Story (1954), another failure, and returned to southern California in 1956. She then went on a successful theatre tour of Don Juan in Hell directed by Agnes Moorehead and co-starring Ricardo Montalbán.

Astor's memoir, My Story: An Autobiography, was published in 1959, becoming a sensation in its day and a bestseller. It was the result of Father Ciklic urging her to write. Though she spoke of her troubled personal life, her parents, her marriages, the scandals, her battle with alcoholism, and other areas of her life, she did not mention the movie industry or her career in detail. In 1967, a second book was published, A Life on Film, where she discussed her career. It, too, became a bestseller. Astor also tried her hand at fiction, writing the novels The Incredible Charley Carewe (1960), The Image of Kate (1962), which was published in 1964 in a German translation as Jahre und Tage, The O'Conners (1964), Goodbye, Darling, be Happy (1965), and A Place Called Saturday (1968).

Astor appeared in several movies during this time, including Stranger in My Arms (1959). She made a comeback in Return to Peyton Place (1961) playing Roberta Carter, the domineering mother who insists the "shocking" novel written by Allison Mackenzie should be banned from the school library, and received good reviews for her performance. According to film scholar Gavin Lambert, Astor invented memorable bits of business in her last scene of that film, where Roberta's vindictive motives are exposed.

=== Final years and death ===
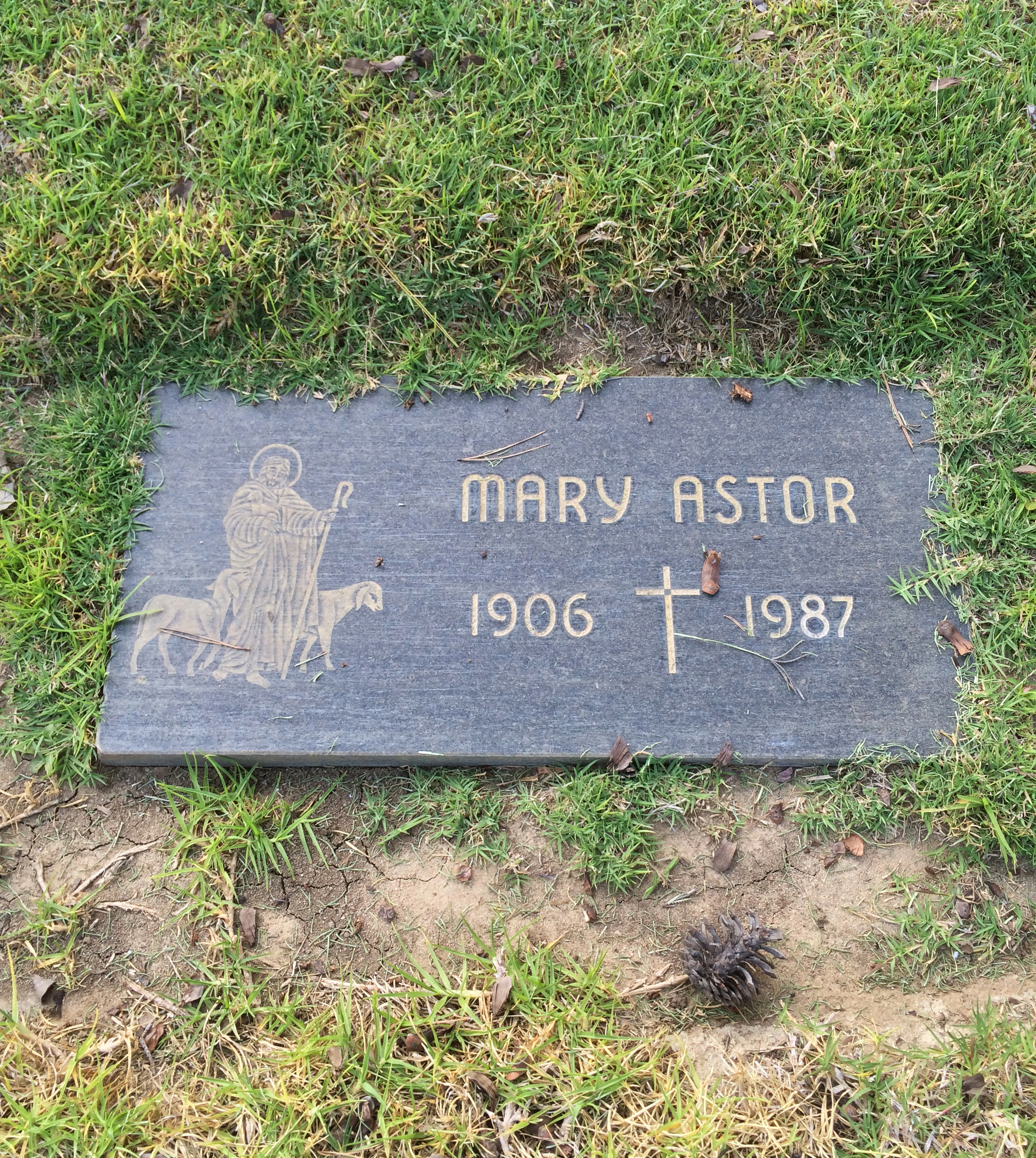
Astor's grave at Holy Cross Cemetery

After a trip around the world in 1964, Astor was lured away from her Malibu, California home, where she was gardening and working on her third novel, to make what she decided would be her final film. She was offered the small role as a key figure, Jewel Mayhew, in the murder mystery Hush...Hush, Sweet Charlotte (1964), starring her friend Bette Davis. She filmed her final scene with Cecil Kellaway at Oak Alley Plantation in southern Louisiana. In A Life on Film, she described her character as "a little old lady, waiting to die." Astor decided it would serve as her swan song in the movie business. After 109 movies in a career spanning 45 years, she turned in her Screen Actors Guild card and retired.

Astor later moved to Fountain Valley, California, where she lived near her son, Anthony del Campo (from her third marriage to Mexican film editor Manuel del Campo), and his family, until 1971. That same year, suffering from a chronic heart condition, she moved to a small cottage on the grounds of the Motion Picture & Television Country House, the industry's retirement facility in Woodland Hills, Los Angeles, where she had a private table when she chose to eat in the resident dining room. She appeared in the television documentary series Hollywood: A Celebration of the American Silent Film (1980), co-produced by Kevin Brownlow, in which she discussed her roles during the silent film period. After years of retirement, she had been urged to appear in Brownlow's documentary by a former sister-in-law Bessie Love, who also appeared in the series.

Astor died on September 25, 1987, at age 81, of respiratory failure due to pulmonary emphysema while in the hospital at the Motion Picture House complex. She is interred in Holy Cross Cemetery in Culver City, California. Astor has a motion pictures star on the Hollywood Walk of Fame at 6701 Hollywood Boulevard.

== Radio appearances ==
Year	Program	Episode/source
1939	The Campbell Playhouse	"The Hurricane"
1941	Gulf Screen Guild Theatre	No Time for Comedy
1943	Gulf Screen Guild Theatre	The Maltese Falcon
1944	Inner Sanctum Mystery	"The Melody of Death" (April 22)

== In popular culture ==
- Edward Sorel wrote and drew the graphic novel Mary Astor's Purple Diary: The Great American Sex Scandal of 1936, about Mary Astor.

== See also ==
- List of actors with Academy Award nominations

== Bibliography ==
=== Works ===
- My Story: An Autobiography (1959)
- The Incredible Charlie Carewe (1963)
- The O'Conners (1964)
- Goodbye Darling, Be Happy (1965)
- The Image of Kate (1966)
- A Life on Film (1967)
- A Place Called Saturday (1968)

=== Sources ===
- Sorel, Edward (2016). Mary Astor's Purple Diary: The Great American Sex Scandal of 1936. Liveright Publishing. ISBN 978-1-63149-023-1.
- Egan, Joseph (2016). The Purple Diaries: Mary Astor and the Most Sensational Hollywood Scandal of the 1930s. Diversion Publishing. ISBN 978-1-68230-299-6.
- Kathleen Spaltro The Great Lie: The Creation of Mary Astor (2021) ISBN 9798706724467
