= Junior League of Boston =

Women's service organisation

- Formation: 1906
- Founder: Sarah Lawrence Slattery
- Parent organization: Association of Junior Leagues
- Website: www.jlboston.org
- Formerly called: Sewing Circle League

The Junior League of Boston is a women’s service organization that has worked to improve the communities of the greater Boston area since the beginning of the 20th century. Founded in 1906, it was the second Junior League in the world. The Boston League currently has over 500 members who together provide over 16,000 service hours each year. It is a member of the Association of Junior Leagues International.

The Junior League of Boston’s official mission statement is: "The Junior League of Boston is an organization of women whose mission is to advance women’s leadership for meaningful community impact through volunteer action, collaboration, and training."

The organization’s primary goal is to improve the communities of the greater Boston area. Since its founding, it has provided both money and manpower to causes including increasing unemployment funds during the Great Depression and advocating for disability issues and child abuse during the 1960s and 1970s. In recent decades, it has focused its efforts on the empowerment of girls and women with service projects, including one-on-one mentoring and arts education for elementary school girls.

Beyond its primary purpose of service, the Junior League has also been central to Boston society. Particularly in its early years, the League counted some of Boston’s most prominent women as members. Speakers who have visited the organization include Booker T. Washington, William Howard Taft, and John F. Kennedy.

== History ==
In 1906, former debutante Sarah Lawrence Slattery established the Sewing Circle League, a charity group based from her sewing circle of upper-class Boston women. She modeled the group after the Junior League of New York, founded in 1901, and aimed to provide young women opportunities to do stimulating work, to help their communities, and to form female friendships. In these early years, the group aimed its charitable efforts primarily towards poor children, the sick, and the elderly, but also expanded its reach to settlement houses. From the beginning, the group emphasized the training of its members. Training mainly consisted of field trips to various Boston charitable and municipal agencies, lectures on Boston’s social problems, and group workshops for the women. By 1912, the Sewing Circle League had 160 members and was engaged with over 50 charitable organizations. On October 25, 1916, the group voted to change its name to “The Junior League of Boston” and became the second Junior League in the United States.

Over the years, the Junior League adapted its efforts to changing times. During the Great Depression, the League raised money to supplement relief funds and unemployment assistance in Boston. During World War II, the League helped other organizations that aided soldiers, including the American Red Cross. After the war, as awareness of limitations caused by disabilities increase, the League engaged in more related projects. In 1950, they released The Guide to Boston for the Handicapped. In the 1960s, the League produced several documentaries with WGBH-TV, including “The Innocents,” which examined establishments for people with disabilities. In the 1970s, the League established a child abuse center for the Massachusetts Welfare Department. In 1985, two members of the Junior League testified before Congress in hearing for a bill called “Amendments to the Foster Care and Adoption Assistance Program,” aiming to establish more transitional houses for homeless youth.

The League also underwent several demographic changes in the 1970s and 1980s. Originally, membership was only granted to women who were “proposed” by a current member, then “endorsed” by two others. As a result, the League tended to exclude women outside of elite social circles. The proposal and endorsement requirement was removed in the 1980s, as part of an increased effort to diversify the membership. The League saw an increase in employed members, meaning that members had fewer hours to spare for volunteering. In response, the League organized more workshops geared towards the professional world as part of member training. In addition, the average age of members increased from 22 to 31 between the 1970s and 1980s.

=== Headquarters ===
The League’s headquarters were originally at Zero Marlboro St., opposite from the Boston Public Garden. In 1953, the Katherine Gibbs School took over their building, so the League temporarily met in the Harvard Club of Boston. They purchased a new place for headquarters at 117 Newbury St. in 1958, and remain there today. In 2011, the League began renovation and refurbishment of this space, in part to make it handicap accessible and better suited to the modern needs of the organization.

== Noteworthy events ==
=== Notable Speakers Series ===
The Junior League of Boston began hosting notable speakers soon after their founding. They have hosted Dr. Richard C. Cabot (founder of Social Services), Charles W. Eliot (president of Harvard University), Booker T. Washington, Jane Addams (founder of Hull House), William Howard Taft, and a warden of Sing-Sing. Most notably, the Junior League of Boston hosted President John F. Kennedy on October 23, 1946. President Kennedy gave his famous speech, “Why I am a Democrat.” Given shortly before his campaign came to a close, the speech’s moderate stance helped to center his candidacy.

=== Show House ===
Historically, the Junior League of Boston contributed to a greater movement throughout the 1920s to foster the arts among their members. The women of the Junior League of Boston were highly involved in a national effort to make the arts available to women and part of a healthy community life. In the 1920s, the Junior League of Boston was known for their avant-garde taste, opting for a fresh and modern art deco style for their clubhouse. For many women of the Junior League of Boston, the use of arts in their headquarters was an act of self-expression.

Their skills in interior decorating were not limited to their headquarters. Since 1970, the Junior League of Boston’s Show House event had been one of its most noteworthy and well known. Originally held annually and called the Decorator’s Show House and Garden Tour, the fundraiser brought together numerous designers who redecorated, and at times restored, a historic site to then be toured by the public. In the past, it was the only League-wide event, and all members were expected to contribute to the project. Ticket sales from tours are donated to the Junior League and the community organizations with whom they work. Funds raised through the first Show House allowed the League to develop and open the Gilday Center, a daycare facility for abused children. By 1984, the annual event had raised over $1 million.

Previous sites have included the 1802 Norfolk Inn and the 1921 Potter Estate. The 2016 Show House was held at the 1854 Nathaniel Allen House. In this execution of the event, most of the décor and artwork was available for purchase, increasing the League’s fundraising potential.

=== Charity Gala ===
The Junior League of Boston hosted an annual charity gala, which was one of its most famous and successful events of the year. The League’s history of hosting galas and balls dates back over sixty years. These events provided crucial fundraising for their operations. The 2016 Gilded Gala raised over $85,000 through ticket sales and live and silent auctions.

== Notable members ==
- Peggy Stuart Coolidge: composer and conductor
- Helen Morton: member of the Boards of Directors of the Community Music Center of Boston, United South End Settlements, the Boston Center for the Arts, and the Harbor Light Homeless Shelter.
- Nora Saltonstall: received the Croix de Geurre for her work as a wartime chauffeur on the Western Front in World War I. Her letters were also published as Out Here at the Front: The World War I Letters of Nora Saltonstall.
- Sarah Lawrence Slattery: founder of JL Boston and daughter of William Lawrence
- Hilary R. Sessions: mother of Tiffany Sessions and author of Where’s My Tiffany?
- Carolyn G. Connors: treasurer for Mayor Kevin White of Boston and vice president of Massachusetts Special Olympics
- Virginia Walker: Hollywood film actress

== Publications ==
=== Cookbooks ===
- Presenting Boston… : A Cookbook (1st ed. 1976)
- More than a Tea Party: a Collection of Regional Recipes from the Junior League of Boston (1989)
- Boston Uncommon: a Culinary Journey through Boston’s Distinctive Neighborhoods (2006)

=== Documentaries ===
- The Innocents (1960)
- The Disquieted (1960)
- The Exceptional Child (196-)

=== Guidebooks ===
- A Guide to Boston (1945): written for servicemen returning after World War II
- The Guide to Boston for the Handicapped (1950)
- Along the Coast of Essex County; A Guidebook (1970)

=== Opera ===
- The Fisherman’s Wife (1967): children’s opera commissioned for its 50th Anniversary

=== Periodicals ===
- Bulletin (1929-1975)
- Junior League of Boston Magazine (1945-1947)
- Happenings (1970-)
- Community Newsletter (1981-1993)
