= Herbert Bayard Swope =

20th-century American journalist

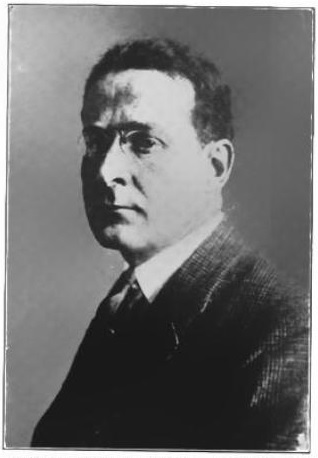
- Swope circa 1917
- Born: January 5, 1882; St. Louis, Missouri, U.S.
- Died: June 20, 1958 (aged 76); Manhattan, New York, U.S.
- Occupations: Editor, journalist
- Spouse: Margaret
- Children: 2
- Relatives: Gerard Swope (brother); Henrietta Hill Swope (niece)
- Writing career
- Notable awards: Pulitzer Prize for Reporting

Herbert Bayard Swope Sr. (/ˈbaɪɑːrd/; January 5, 1882 – June 20, 1958) was an American editor, journalist and intimate of the Algonquin Round Table. Swope spent most of his career at the New York World. He was the first and three-time recipient of the Pulitzer Prize for Reporting. Swope was called the "best reporter in America" by Lord Northcliffe of the London Daily Mail.

== Background ==
Herbert Bayard Swope was born on January 5, 1882, in St. Louis, Missouri, to German immigrants Ida Cohn and Isaac Swope, a watchcase maker. He was the youngest of four children – the younger brother of businessman and General Electric president Gerard Swope.

== Career ==
=== Newspaper career ===
At the age of 18, Swope worked for St. Louis Post-Dispatch. According to Swope, he was fired for spending too much time coaching football. He then worked for the Chicago Tribune and the New York Herald. In 1908, he joined New York World.

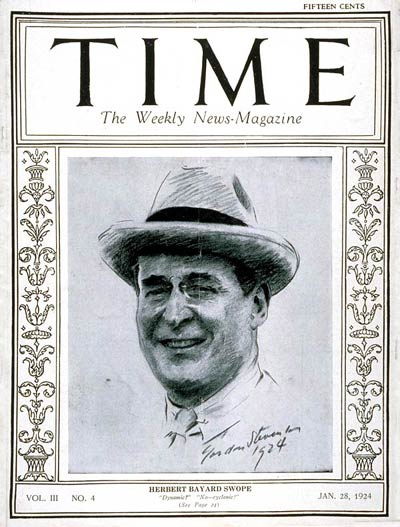
Time cover, January 28, 1924

Swope was the first recipient of the Pulitzer Prize for Reporting in 1917 for a series of articles that year entitled "Inside the German Empire". The articles formed the basis for a book released in 1917 entitled Inside the German Empire: In the Third Year of the War (ISBN 9781436646178), which he co-authored with James W. Gerard. Swope led the official press delegation at the Paris Peace Conference. In 1920, he became executive editor of the New York World and remained in the role for nine years until his resignation in 1929 following a disagreement with its owners.

He is known for saying, "I can't give you a sure-fire formula for success, but I can give you a formula for failure: try to please everybody all the time." He is also credited with coining the phrase "Cold War".

Although standard editorial pages have been printed by newspapers for many centuries, Swope established the first modern op-ed page in 1921. When he took over as editor in 1920, he realized that the page opposite the editorials was "a catchall for book reviews, society boilerplate, and obituaries." He wrote:

It occurred to me that nothing is more interesting than opinion when opinion is interesting, so I devised a method of cleaning off the page opposite the editorial, which became the most important in America... and thereon I decided to print opinions, ignoring facts.

He hired the widowed Consuela Sheridan (nee Frewen), the maternal cousin of Winston Churchill, as a roving reporter in Europe, and she landed many scoops including interviews with the negotiating parties for Irish Independence.

Swope served as the editor for New York World's 21-day crusade against the Ku Klux Klan in October 1921, which won the newspaper the Pulitzer Prize for Public Service in 1922. As an example of investigative journalism, it was ranked 81st of the top 100 journalism stories of the 20th century by New York University's journalism department.

Swope was called the "best reporter in America" by Lord Northcliffe of the London Daily Mail.

=== Public service ===
Following the U.S. declaring war on Germany, Swope became the assistant of his friend Bernard Baruch of the War Industries Board. From 1942 to 1946, he was personal consultant to the U.S. Secretary of War. He was spokesman for Baruch when Baruch was U.S. delegate to the United Nations Atomic Energy Commission.

=== Gaming career ===
In 1934, Governor Herbert H. Lehman named Swope as chairman of the New York's state racing commission. He held the post for 11 years. He was a legendary poker player, at one point winning over $470,000 in a game with an oil baron, a steel magnate, and an entertainer. He was also a member of a social club, the precursor to the Algonquin Round Table known as the Thanatopsis Inside Straight and Pleasure Club. He was inducted into the Croquet Hall of Fame of the United States Croquet Association in 1979 and his son Herbert Bayard Swope, Jr. in 1981.

== Mansion ==
His home was known as Land's End, Prospect Point, Sands Point, New York. He hosted parties with the Duke and Duchess of Windsor, Vivien Leigh and Laurence Olivier, Dorothy Parker, Harpo Marx, Winston Churchill, Averell Harriman, Albert Einstein, Alexander Woollcott – as well as F. Scott Fitzgerald. These associations, along with other similarities to the houses and events in The Great Gatsby, helped give rise to unsubstantiated reports that Fitzgerald had modeled Daisy Buchanan's home in the 1925 novel after Swope's home.

However, Swope did not buy Land's End until late 1928. The more likely explanation that ties Swope to Fitzgerald is the time period of 1922–24, when Fitzgerald was living in nearby Great Neck. Prior to buying the Sands Point mansion, Swope had been renting a home since 1919 on East Shore Road in Great Neck, overlooking Manhasset Bay. The property was directly north of 325 East Shore Road, the residence of sportswriter Ring Lardner. The two were good friends. David O. Selznick and Jock Whitney met at the home many times throughout the 20s and 30s and held meetings at the mansion that secured funding for Gone with the Wind.

Other reports suggest the home, built in 1902, had been designed by Stanford White – although most sources dispute the claim.

The clapboard colonial mansion included 15 bedrooms and 14 baths (eleven full baths), a seven-car garage, a tennis court with a tennis pavilion, a rose garden and a guest house – on 13.35 acres. The 20,000-square-foot (1,900 m^{2}) waterfront mansion had originally been built for clothing merchant John S. Browning Sr. in 1911 and originally named Kidd's Rocks. It was purchased in 1921 by Malcolm D. Sloane, whose wife renamed the estate "Keewaydin". The house had been a site for a Vanity Fair photo shoot with Madonna and had been a location for the 1978 shooting of The Greek Tycoon, a film on the life of Aristotle Onassis.

Keith Richards' family lived there for a time in the early 1980s. Charles Shipman Payson and his wife, Virginia Kraft, purchased the house in the 1980s. In 2005 she sold the house to developer Bert Brodsky of Port Washington for $17.5 million. "They misrepresented themselves", Payson told The Observer, "I would not show it to any developer. He said that his life's ambition was to live in that manor, but it was very clear at the closing that they had no intention of living in it. They are the most awful people I have ever heard of, and that includes terrorists and dictators. They have taken a work of art and permitted it to be totally decimated. It was in pristine condition when I left ... He let it fall apart. He stripped everything out that he could sell, which is sacrilegious. I went by the house perhaps two years after we sold it, and that's when I realized how he was going to get around the town's objections. Broken windows, storming in—it's sinful". In 2011, the home was demolished and the property was subdivided.

== Personal life ==
Swope married Margaret. They had a son and daughter, Herbert Jr. and Mrs. Robert Brandt. He had surgery on his intestines and died from postoperative pneumonia on June 20, 1958, aged 76, at Doctors Hospital.

Awards and achievements
Preceded by Henry Cabot Lodge	Cover of Time magazine January 28, 1924	Succeeded by Edward Eberle
