= William Hawks =

American film producer (1901–1969)

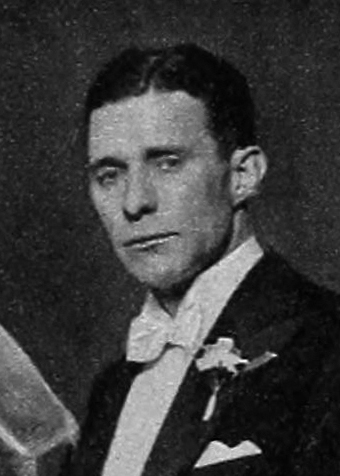
- Hawks in 1929
- Born: William Bellinger Hawks; January 29, 1901; Neenah, Wisconsin, U.S.
- Died: January 10, 1969 (aged 67); Santa Monica, California, U.S.
- Education: Yale University
- Occupation: Film producer
- Years active: 1930–1958
- Spouses: Bessie Love (m. 1929; div. 1936) Virginia Walker (m. 1938; div. 1942) Frances Koshland Judge (m. 1951)
- Relatives: Howard Hawks (brother); Kenneth Hawks (brother); Mary Astor (sister-in-law); Athole Shearer (sister-in-law)

William Bellinger Hawks (January 29, 1901 – January 10, 1969) was an American film producer.

== Career ==
Hawks attended Yale University, where he was a member of Scroll and Key and graduated in 1923. In his early career, Hawks was a stockbroker. By the early 1930s, Hawks was a Hollywood talent agent and, as such, brought novelist William Faulkner to his brother Howard Hawks' attention in 1932, becoming Faulkner's Hollywood agent.

He created United Producers Corporation in 1940 with Charles Boyer, Ronald Colman, Irene Dunne, Anatole Litvak, and Lewis Milestone. They intended to produce ten films for RKO Pictures. My Life with Caroline was the first of the intended series, thus Hawks became a film producer.

== Personal life ==
Hawks married actress Bessie Love at St. James' Episcopal Church in South Pasadena, California, on December 27, 1929. Mary Astor, Carmel Myers, and Norma Shearer were her bridesmaids, and Howard Hawks and MGM wunderkind Irving Thalberg ushered. Mary Astor was William's sister-in-law, married to brother Kenneth Hawks. Their reception was held at the Ambassador Hotel.

Hawks and Love then lived at the Havenhurst Apartments in Hollywood. They had a daughter, Patricia Hawks (February 19, 1932, Los Angeles), who had some bit parts in 1952 movies. They divorced in 1936.

He married actress Virginia Walker (July 31, 1916, Boston, Massachusetts – December 23, 1946, Los Angeles) in late June 1938 in Mexico. She had played Miss Alice Swallow in the 1938 comedy film Bringing Up Baby, her first film role. They divorced in 1942.

He was married to Boston socialite Frances Koshland Judge (1916–1993) on October 3, 1951, in West Los Angeles by Municipal Judge Louis Kaufmann.

Hawks died in Santa Monica, California, of a respiratory illness, on January 10, 1969.

=== Croquet ===
He was a member of the United States Croquet Association and was inducted posthumously into their Croquet Hall of Fame in 1981, as was brother Howard in 1980. He often played with actor George Sanders, who was also a posthumous 1980 inductee. Hawks most often played with a Jaques mallet, as did Sanders.

== Filmography ==
- My Life with Caroline (1941)
- The Tall Men (1955)
- The Last Wagon (1956)
- The Law and Jake Wade (1958)
- Imitation General (1958)
