= Green Gables Croquet Club =

The Green Gables Croquet Club of Spring Lake, New Jersey was founded in 1957 by Suzie Linden (1913–1996). It is the oldest continuous croquet club in the United States and among the three founding members of the United States Croquet Association. It is believed that the original property has been sold; on 23 November 2008 the author of this update, who is a resident of Spring Lake, witnessed the demolition of the original house (also known by the same name.)

== Early years ==
Green Gables began in 1957 when Suzie Linden (then Oakes) invited a few friends for a game of croquet on the lawn of her ocean front Spring Lake home, known as Green Gables. Since forming, generations of players enjoyed the ocean breeze and boardwalk view while playing on the croquet malls. GGCC is recognized as the first on the east coast, and now the oldest continuously running club in the USA.

== Transition ==
After Suzie's death her property was sold and the croquet courts removed by the new owners. In 1999, the club built three world class courts in Sea Girt, NJ on state owned leased land in front of the general's house on the NJ National Guard Center.

== Basic Information ==
A growing club with a current membership of 70, Green Gables has three championship croquet courts and is the site of an invitational croquet tournament in mid-July each year.

== Noteworthy ==
Green Gables Croquet Club is the oldest continuous croquet club in the United States today and one of the founding members of the United States Croquet Association. In 1977, Jack Osborn gathered representatives of the clubs on the US East Coast, to meet in to agree on a standard set of rules for croquet in the United States. This group eventually agreed on the rules and formed the USCA.

== On Strategy ==
In the New York Times, founder Suzie Linden described the mental aspects of Croquet as a "combination of bilards and chess," adding, "You always have to think three moves ahead!" Suzie Linden was inducted into the Croquet Hall of Fame in 1980, followed in 2008 by her daughter Diane.

== See also ==
- Absence of mallets feared, Croquet tradition at stake By Mark McGarrity for The Star-Ledger, Newark, N.J., (1997) on speculation that the Green Gables Croquet Club might close following Suzie Linden's death.
- United States Croquet Association
- USCA Croquet News Magazine
- Main website
- Suzie's Story:The Autobiography of Socialite, Philanthropist & World Traveler
