= Imitation General =

1958 film by George Marshall

- Theatrical release poster
- Directed by: George Marshall
- Written by: William Bowers
- Based on: Imitation General; 1956 short story by William Chamberlain
- Produced by: William B. Hawks
- Starring: Glenn Ford; Red Buttons; Taina Elg
- Cinematography: George J. Folsey
- Edited by: Harold F. Kress
- Distributed by: Metro-Goldwyn-Mayer
- Release date: August 20, 1958
- Running time: 88 minutes
- Country: United States
- Language: English
- Budget: $944,000
- Box office: $3,165,000

Imitation General is a 1958 American black-and-white comedy drama war film in CinemaScope, directed by George Marshall, produced by William B. Hawks, and starring Glenn Ford, Red Buttons, and Taina Elg. The film, distributed by Metro-Goldwyn-Mayer, is based on a short story of the same name by William Chamberlain.

== Plot ==
In the aftermath of a big battle during World War II, Americans Brigadier General Charles Lane, Master Sergeant Murphy "Murph" Savage, and Corporal Chan Derby are cut off behind enemy lines. The general takes over a farmhouse belonging to annoyed Frenchwoman Simone. Lane determines that there is a gap in the American lines and decides to organize a defense from whatever stragglers he can gather together. Shortly afterwards, however, he is killed saving Murph's life.

The first American soldier to show up, Corporal Terry Sellers, mistakes Murph for Lane, as Murph is holding the general's helmet. This gives Murph an idea. Recalling Lane's assessment that leadership is desperately needed to rally the disorganized troops, Murph masquerades as the general, with Derby and Simone's reluctant help. Murph manages to repulse a couple of attacks spearheaded by German tanks, all the while avoiding the devious and vicious Private Orville Hutchmeyer, who knows Murph and holds a grudge against him.

At the end of the engagement, Murph is knocked out by shrapnel, allowing him to "die" and resume his real identity, while General Lane is honored—posthumously—for Murph's actions.

== Cast ==
- Glenn Ford as M/Sgt. Murphy Savage
- Red Buttons as Cpl. Chan Derby
- Taina Elg as Simone
- Dean Jones as Cpl. Terry Sellers
- Kent Smith as BG Charles Lane
- Tige Andrews as Pfc. Orville Hutchmeyer
- John Wilder as Lt. Jeff Clayton
- Ralph Votrian as American Pfc.

== Reception ==
According to MGM records, the film earned $1,915,000 in the US and Canada and $1,250,000 elsewhere, resulting in a profit of $1,095,000.

In his August 21, 1958, review for The New York Times, Bosley Crowther praised the film: “That blessing called "G. I. humor," which truly and fortunately has prevailed in the face of the worst circumstances, including enemy fire and weak scripts, is the durable prop on which the nonsense of (the film) leans. ...(This sort of humor) ...has to have the ring of authenticity in concept as well as in the words. And this calls for more than accurate writing; it calls for accurate delivery, too. There are few things more depressing than soldier humor that is badly forced or fake. Fortunately, the dialogue in this romp is pretty genuine, after allowance is made for the omission of the inevitable scattering of naughty words.” The screen play is “ ... salted with soldier skepticism and wisecracks of sharp and icy mirth. And George Marshall has conned their delivery in lively and flavorsome style ...This is fortunate, we say, because ... the authors and director bandy weapons and killings tastelessly in the midst of what has the nature and the attitude of farce.... It's hard to tell what's going on, except that our side is winning and lots of Germans are being killed. However, ...Mr. Buttons does a most amusing job ... Mr. Andrews is also amusing and remarkably potent with a line as a villainous and vengeful scrounger .... and Mr. Ford takes on the airs of a general with occasionally nice satiric point....”
