= The Tall Men (film) =

1955 film by Raoul Walsh

- Theatrical release poster
- Directed by: Raoul Walsh
- Screenplay by: Sydney Boehm; Frank Nugent
- Based on: The Tall Men by Heck Allen (as Clay Fisher)
- Produced by: William A. Bacher; William B. Hawks
- Starring: Clark Gable; Jane Russell; Robert Ryan; Cameron Mitchell
- Cinematography: Leo Tover
- Edited by: Louis R. Loeffler
- Music by: Victor Young
- Production company: 20th Century-Fox
- Distributed by: 20th Century-Fox
- Release dates: September 22, 1955 (Los Angeles); October 11, 1955 (New York City)
- Running time: 122 minutes
- Country: United States
- Language: English
- Budget: $3.1 million
- Box office: $12 million (worldwide)

The Tall Men is a 1955 American Western film directed by Raoul Walsh, and starring Clark Gable, Jane Russell, and Robert Ryan. It was produced by William A. Bacher and William B. Hawks. Sydney Boehm and Frank S. Nugent wrote the screenplay, based on the 1954 novel of the same name by Heck Allen (as Clay Fisher). Filming took place in Sierra de Órganos National Park in the municipality of Sombrerete, Mexico.

== Plot ==
Brothers Ben and Clint Allison are on their way to the goldfields of Montana after serving with the Confederate Army's Quantrill's Raiders. In need of money, they decide to rob wealthy businessman, Nathan Stark. At gunpoint, they force him to go with them to a hideout, where they tell him he will be allowed to leave the next day, minus his money. Stark talks them into becoming partners with him on a cattle drive from Texas to Montana using Stark's money and the Allisons' expertise. While the three are on their way to buy the cattle, their pack horse loaded with supplies falls in an icy river. They come upon a party of starving settlers, who give them shelter from a blizzard. Among them is Nella Turner, whom both Ben and Stark find intriguing.

The next day, the Allisons and Stark continue on their way, but discover Sioux Indians are likely to attack the settlers. Ben heads back to help, while Clint and Nathan head to an army post from where they can embark to San Antonio. All the settlers, except Nella, have been killed; she goes with Ben, and they find a cabin where they wait out the storm. They begin to fall in love, but become estranged when they discover that their dreams for life do not match; Nell had a hellish childhood on a farm, and now wants more than that narrow world; Ben merely wants his own ranch. Once the storm subsides, a rescue party of soldiers arrives. Ben learns that his brother and Stark have taken the stagecoach to San Antonio. Nella wants to go to California, but she is told that due to the weather, the only road open is the one to San Antonio.

Once they arrive in San Antonio, Ben and Nella go their separate ways, after sniping at each other as they disembark from the stagecoach. As Nella is checking in at the hotel, Stark comes down the stairs and is delighted to see her. He romances her with a fancy meal and champagne; afterwards, she shows up where Ben is staying, tipsily picks a fight with him, and behaves jealously toward a Mexican woman, who she thinks is talking about her and trying to take Ben somewhere, though she is really looking for help to find Clint.

Ben recruits a gang of loyal vaqueros for the rugged 1,500-mile (2,414 km) trek to Montana. On the journey, Nella demonstrates a romantic interest in Stark; he has the bigger dreams she prefers, but she flirts with Ben. They harp and snap at each other so much, though, that Stark has the impression that the two truly dislike each other. Nella occasionally sings "The Tall Men", but varies the lyrics, depending on her mood. When she sings, she always makes sure that Ben is listening.

Along the trail, the cattle drive is confronted by a gang of jayhawkers, demanding $5,000 for permission to cross into Kansas; Ben refuses, and a gunfight ensues. Many Jayhawkers are killed. After several instances of losing his cool with Stark and general volatility, Clint asks Ben to let him scout the route ahead, in case of attack by the Sioux. One day, Clint's horse returns without him, and he is found tied to a tree, with about half a dozen Sioux arrows in his chest. For days, Ben scouts the movements of the Sioux, then returns to present a strategy of using the cattle and horses in a stampede against the Indians. After the ensuing battle, only about 100 to 150 head of cattle are lost.

When they arrive in Mineral City, Montana, Stark is paid $170,000 for the herd. Ben goes to Stark's office, in the rear of the saloon, to receive his portion and the bonus for the drovers. Stark gets a dig in at Ben, telling him that he is in a hurry to get to the hotel where Nella and he will be celebrating. Then, he announces that he has another reason, beyond the money, that he has been waiting for "this day", and that is to exact revenge on a man who shoved a gun in his belly. Stark calls in members of the "vigilante committee", who are set to hang Ben; Ben, however, having deduced that something like this might happen, has had his men hold everyone in the saloon at gunpoint and be ready to act against Stark. Stark changes his mind. Ben magnanimously only takes $16,000 for his men, $10,000 for himself, and $100 which he gives to the saloonkeeper toward a bottle of champagne for Stark and Nella's wedding. Stark remarks to his henchmen that he is not certain he would have let them hang Ben. He is the only man he has ever respected – "He's what every boy thinks he's going to be when he grows up, and wishes he had been when he's an old man."

Ben returns to his camp, and as he unwraps his sleeping bag, Nella begins singing her song from inside his wagon. This time, her words reflect her love for him – "The only one for me".

== Cast ==
- Clark Gable as Colonel Ben Allison
- Jane Russell as Nella Turner
- Robert Ryan as Nathan Stark
- Cameron Mitchell as Clint Allison
- Juan García as Luis, Allison's head vaquero
- Harry Shannon as Sam, cattleman robbed by jayhawkers
- Emile Meyer as Chickasaw Charlie
- Steve Darrell as Colonel Norris, U.S. Cavalry (credited as Stevan Darrell)

== Reception ==
The film received mixed reviews. Variety wrote:

This is the Clark Gable of old in a role that's straight up his alley – rough, tough, quick on the draw and yet with all the 'right' instincts. The vet actor seems to enjoy himself thoroughly and he is equally at ease in the saddle as in his swap-a-quip dialog with Jane Russell.
There’s no use quibbling about Russell. She goes through most of the film taunting both Gable and Robert Ryan. It's probably only fair to assume that her pancake-flat acting is a secondary consideration. She does show a sense of comedy in a couple of scenes and the pic benefits from it.
