= Marie Russak =

American opera singer and architect (1865–1945)

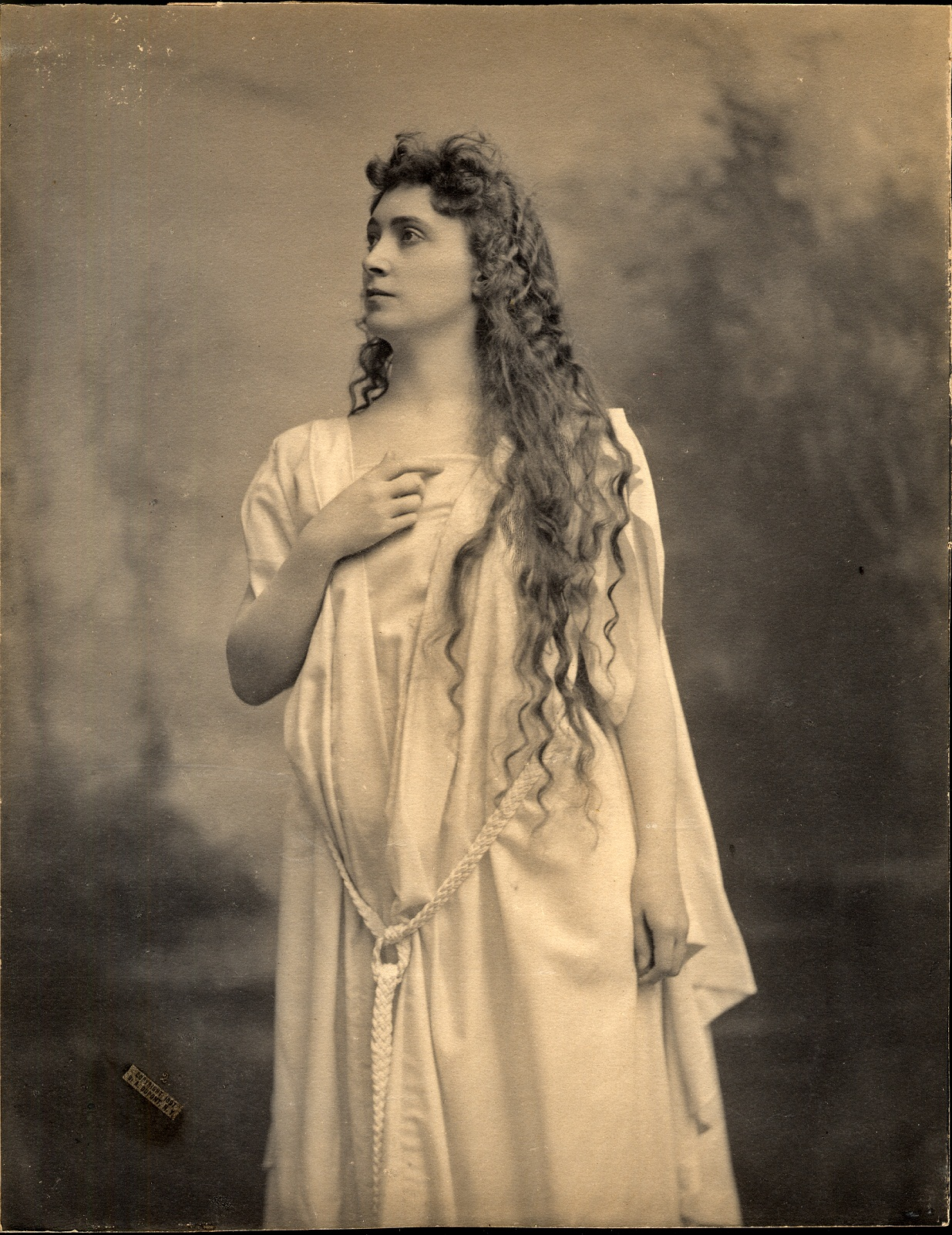
- Marie Russak
- Born: October 7, 1865; Four Corners, California
- Died: March 4, 1945 (aged 79); Hollywood, California
- Occupations: opera singer, architect

Marie Russak (October 7, 1865 – March 4, 1945), also known as Marie Hotchener or Marie Barnard, was an American opera singer and architect.

== Biography ==
Born on October 7, 1865, in the small city of Four Corners, Butte County in northern California, she studied music at Mills College in Oakland. She became a renowned singer, performing in several European cities. In 1899, she married the opera producer Frank Russak and moved to Paris, France with him in 1901. She was deeply interested in Theosophy and became active in the Theosophical Society.

Between 1906 and 1910 she lived in Adyar (Chennai), India, where she deepened her study of esoterism and Theosophy. She participated actively in Co-Masonry, and in 1912 she co-founded the Order of the Temple of the Rosy Cross with Annie Besant. She worked actively with the Rosicrucians until the group was dissolved in 1918.

Soon after leaving India in 1912, Marie helped to found the Krotona Colony. She held a substantial role in building Krotona and designed a number of houses for Theosophists including a well known house at 6106 Temple Hill Drive.

Marie Russak was also involved in architectural design, and her work can still be seen in Krotona. Some of her designs were inspired by Moorish and Mission styles. One of her buildings is Moorcrest.

Marie Russak was born Mary Ellen Barnard, the daughter of Judge Allyn Matther Barnard of California; she later took the stage name of Marie Ellene Barna. She married first, professor, author and later Pulitzer Prize winner Justin Harvey Smith on May 22, 1892, in Boston, Massachusetts; they divorced in 1895. She married second, Frank Russak on September 19, 1899, in Newport, New York; he died in 1918. She married third, Henry Hotchener on 10 Jul 1916 in Los Angeles, California. Russak died on March 4, 1945, in Hollywood, California.
