= Moorcrest =

House in Los Angeles

- Interactive map of the Moorcrest area

General information
- Location: 6147 Temple Hill Drive; Los Angeles, California 90068
- Coordinates: 34.11142°N 118.32305°W
- Year built: 1920
- Owner: Andy Samberg; Joanna Newsom

Technical details
- Floor area: 6,432 square feet (597.6 m^{2})

Design and construction
- Architect: Marie Russak

Moorcrest is a house in Beachwood Canyon, Los Angeles, California, United States. It was built in 1921 for the Utopian Krotona Colony in Beachwood Canyon and was designed by Marie Russak, an architect who designed several buildings for the Theosophist community; Moorcrest is thought of as one of her most famous works.

In the heart of the Hollywood Hills, Moorcrest was once the home of actor Charlie Chaplin. Later, Mary Astor, the star of The Maltese Falcon, sometimes lived at Moorcrest. Her parents, Otto and Helen Langhanke, owned the home for a time.

As of 2014, the house is owned by musician Joanna Newsom and comedian Andy Samberg.
