= Kenneth Hawks =

American film director and producer (1898–1930)

- Born: Kenneth Neil Hawks; August 12, 1898; Goshen, Indiana, U.S.
- Died: January 2, 1930 (aged 31); Santa Monica, California, U.S.
- Occupation: Film director
- Years active: 1926–1930
- Spouse: Mary Astor (m. 1928)
- Relatives: Howard Hawks (brother); William Hawks (brother); Bessie Love (sister-in-law); Athole Shearer (sister-in-law)

Kenneth Neil Hawks (August 12, 1898 – January 2, 1930) was an American film director and producer.

== Life and career ==
Hawks served in the United States Army Air Service during World War I. He then graduated from Yale University in 1919. He soon moved to Hollywood, California with brother Howard Hawks; He became a writer, editor and supervisor at Fox Films Corporation in 1926. He began directing films for Fox in 1929. He was supervising producer of the Fox documentary film True Heaven (1929). On January 2, 1930, while directing filming of aerial scenes for the film Such Men Are Dangerous, he was killed in a mid-air plane crash over the Pacific Ocean along with 9 others: pilot Walter Ross Cook, cameraman George Eastman, assistant director Ben Frankel, assistant director Max Gold, Tom Harris, Harry Johannes, Otho Jordan, pilot Halleck Rouse, and cinematographer Conrad Wells (also known as Abraham Fried). The planes that crashed into each other were identical Stinson SM-1F Detroiters; sun glare was listed as probable cause.

His body was recovered and after cremation his ashes were scattered over the site of his death.

== Family ==
He was the brother of director Howard Hawks and producer William Hawks.

Kenneth met actress Mary Astor in 1927; the couple married on February 26, 1928, at her home, Moorcrest. Kenneth gave Astor a new Packard as a wedding gift. They soon moved to a home on Lookout Mountain in Los Angeles, California.

== Filmography as director ==
- Masked Emotions (1929)
- Big Time (1929)
- Such Men Are Dangerous (1930)
