= Big Time (1929 film) =

1929 film by Kenneth Hawks

- Lobby card
- Directed by: Kenneth Hawks
- Written by: Wallace Smith (story); Sidney Lanfield; William K. Wells
- Starring: Lee Tracy; Mae Clarke
- Cinematography: L. William O'Connell
- Edited by: Alfred DeGaetano
- Production company: Fox Film Corporation
- Release date: September 7, 1929
- Running time: 87 minutes
- Country: United States
- Language: English

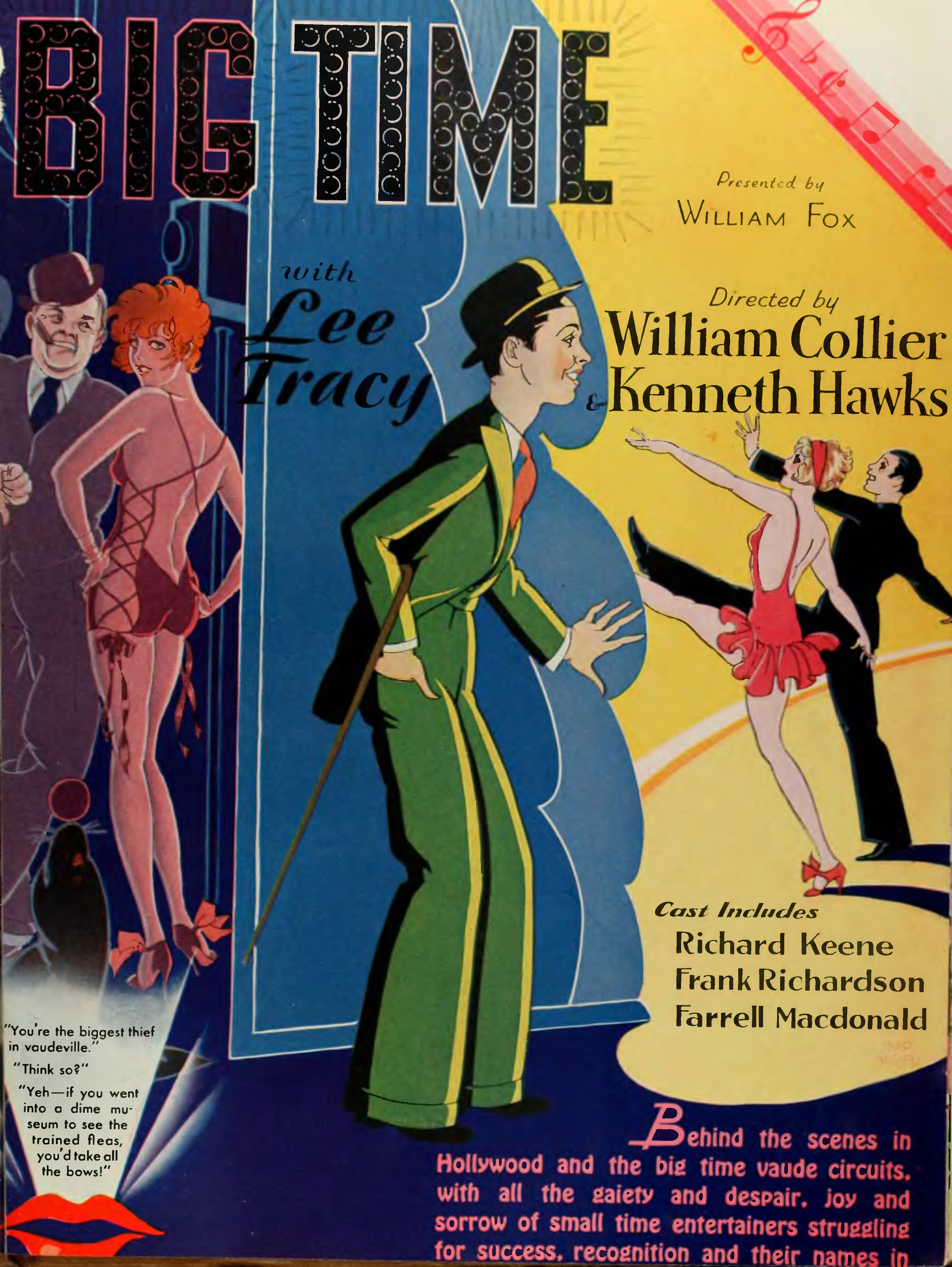
Big Time ad in The Film Daily, 1929

Big Time is a 1929 American all-talking pre-Code drama film starring Lee Tracy and Mae Clarke as a show business couple who break up over his infidelity. This was Clarke's film debut. Director Kenneth Hawks was Howard Hawks' brother.

== Cast ==
- Lee Tracy as Eddie Burns
- Mae Clarke as Lily Clark
- Daphne Pollard as Sybil
- Josephine Dunn as Gloria
- Stepin Fetchit as Eli

== Plot ==
The relationship between a male dancer and his actress girlfriend is threatened by a scheming chorister.

Director John Ford had a cameo as himself.

== See also ==
- List of early sound feature films (1926–1929)
