= Virginia Walker =

American actress (1908-1946)

- Walker in a 1945 publicity photo for A Royal Scandal
- Born: Virginia May Walker; July 31, 1908; Cambridge, Massachusetts, U.S.
- Died: December 23, 1946 (aged 38); Los Angeles, California, U.S.
- Other names: Virginia Walker Hawks
- Occupation: Film actress
- Years active: 1938–1945
- Known for: Alice Swallow in Bringing Up Baby
- Spouse: William Hawks (1938-1942)

Virginia May Walker Hawks (July 31, 1908 – December 23, 1946) was an American model and film actress. Born in Cambridge, Massachusetts, she studied Japanese art at the School of the Museum of Fine Arts and pursued a modeling career in national magazine advertisements, through which she was spotted by a Universal Pictures scout and signed to a film contract. Upon arriving in Hollywood, she met filmmaker Howard Hawks, who negotiated her release from Universal and signed her to a personal contract. She made her film debut in Hawks's Bringing Up Baby (1938), and the following year married Hawks's brother William. After their 1942 divorce, she appeared in four more feature film roles, three of them uncredited, for 20th Century Fox.

== Early life and education ==
Virginia May Walker was born in Cambridge, Massachusetts, on July 31, 1908. She was the only daughter of William Homer Walker (1869–1912), a local attorney, and Eva M. Walker (née Perry), originally from Paris. She had two older brothers.

Walker grew up in Boston and Cambridge; the family vacationed in Miami, Florida, during the winters. At age 10, Walker moved to Miami and eventually graduated from Miami High School. She returned to Boston to study Japanese art at the School of the Museum of Fine Arts, with a specialty in Japanese prints. She was a member of the Junior League of Boston.

== Early work ==
Walker began modeling in national magazine advertisements for various companies, including a car manufacturer and a garment designer. She performed in amateur stage productions in Brookline, including dramatic plays staged by the Harvard Dramatic Club and comedies produced by the Hasty Pudding Club. Additionally, she created a skin care product which she manufactured in her home kitchen.

== Film career ==
In 1935, Walker responded to a call for "new faces" by Hollywood filmmaker Cecil B. DeMille, who sought a new actress for his production of Samson and Delilah. DeMille received 3,000 entries from around the country and chose Walker's picture together with five others for further consideration. She was ultimately not chosen for a screen test, but in June 1937, a Universal Pictures scout saw Walker's picture in a magazine advertisement for a soap product, signed her to a contract, and brought her to Hollywood.

Before the studio cast her in a film, however, Walker and a friend went to visit executives at RKO Pictures, including director Howard Hawks. Hawks recognized Walker from her magazine advertisements and wanted her to work for him. He negotiated Walker's release from Universal and signed her to a personal contract. She was one of the first actresses whom Hawks signed to a personal contract, and was loaned to RKO to appear in Hawks's 1938 film Bringing Up Baby. Walker made her film debut playing Alice Swallow, the fiancée of Cary Grant's character.

She put aside her screen career upon her marriage in 1938, but resumed it after her 1942 divorce. In the second part of her career, she signed with 20th Century Fox and played bit roles in four films, three of them uncredited. In 1945 she was signed to appear with James Dunn in Command to Embezzle, a drama film that was ultimately shelved.

== Personal life ==
Walker married film producer William Hawks, brother of Howard Hawks, in June 1938 in Mexico. It was the second marriage for Hawks. The couple divorced in October 1942 in Reno, Nevada.

Walker died on December 23, 1946, after a months-long illness and a surgical procedure at Cedars-Sinai Hospital in Los Angeles. A requiem mass was held for her at the Church of the Good Shepherd in Beverly Hills.

== Filmography ==
Year	Film	Role	Notes
1938	Bringing Up Baby	Alice Swallow	
1945	A Royal Scandal	Lady-in-waiting	Uncredited
1945	Diamond Horseshoe	Chorine	Uncredited
1945	Nob Hill	Mrs. Van Buren	Uncredited
1945	The Caribbean Mystery	Adelaide Marcel	

== Sources ==
- American Film Institute Catalog of Motion Pictures Produced in the United States – Feature Films, 1941–1950 – Film Entries, A–L. University of California Press. 1999. ISBN 9780520215214.
- McBride, Joseph (2013). Hawks on Hawks. University Press of Kentucky. ISBN 9780813144306.
- McCarthy, Todd (2007). Howard Hawks: The Grey Fox of Hollywood. Open Road + Grove/Atlantic. ISBN 9780802196408.
