= Krotona =

Theosophical center in the U.S.

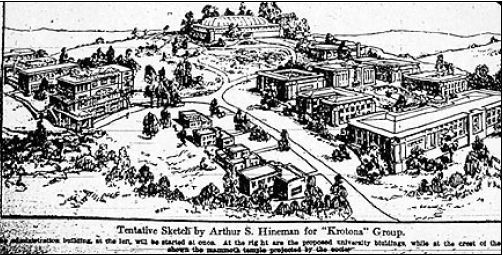
Architectural concept drawing, LA Times, 29 September 1912

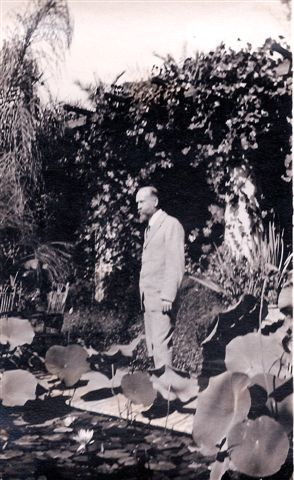
Augustus Knudsen, 1st Dean of Krotona, at the Lotus Pond, a Krotona landmark that was located just west of Temple Hill Drive, in Los Angeles, 1916

Krotona was one of three important Theosophical centers in the United States during the early part of the 20th century. Originally built in Hollywood during 1912, the colony was eventually relocated to Ojai, California, in 1926, where it operates today as the Krotona Institute of Theosophy.

== Description ==
Located just off of State Route 33, the Krotona Institute holds regular classes and workshops on Theosophy, maintains an extensive library on the occult, and has a small bookstore.

The Hollywood Krotona building located at Primrose and Vista Del Mar was erected in 1919. When the Krotonians, spurred by Madame Blavatsky, found Hollywood suffocating their peace-filled theosophies, they decided to move to Ojai California and that is where they have been ever since.

== Notable people ==
- Alice Bailey
- Augustus Knudsen, 1st Dean of Krotona
- Charlie Chaplin
- Mary Astor
- Marie Russak, architect of the Moorcrest house of Krotona
- Radha Burnier
