= Masked Emotions =

1929 film

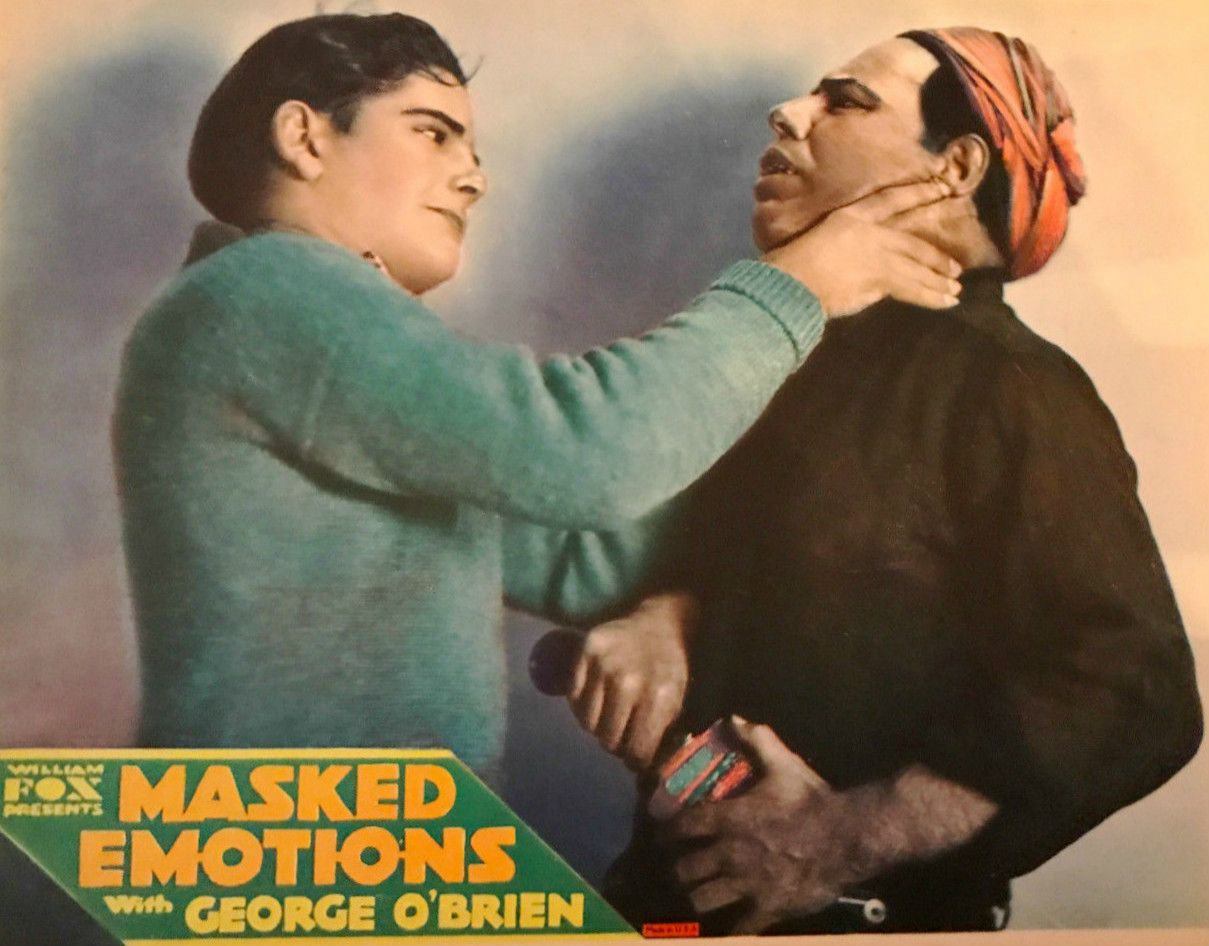
- Lobby card
- Directed by: Kenneth Hawks
- Written by: Harry Brand; Ben Markson; Douglas Z. Doty (titles)
- Based on: Son of Anak by Ben Ames Williams
- Produced by: William Fox
- Starring: George O'Brien
- Cinematography: Sidney Wagner
- Distributed by: Fox Film Corporation
- Release date: June 23, 1929
- Running time: 60 minutes
- Country: United States
- Languages: Sound (synchronized) (English Intertitles)

Masked Emotions is a 1929 American Synchronized sound adventure crime drama film produced and distributed by Fox Film Corporation starring George O'Brien and Nora Lane. While the film has no audible dialog, it was released with a synchronized musical score with sound effects using both the sound-on-disc and sound-on-film process. The screenplay was adapted from Ben Ames Williams' short story Son of Anak. David Butler began as director but had to leave the production to attend to a family emergency, and Kenneth Hawks then assumed directorial duties. The film's soundtrack was recorded using the Movietone sound-on-film process. The soundtrack was also transferred to discs for those theatres that were wired with sound-on-disc sound systems.

== Plot ==
Set on the Maine coast, a young sloop skipper Bramdlet Dickery discovers a plot to smuggle alien Chinese into the United States. Bramdlet's younger brother Thad is enamored with daughter of the captain of the smuggling ship. A struggle over the smuggling ensues.

== Cast ==
- George O'Brien as Bramdlet Dickery
- Nora Lane as Emily Godell
- James Gordon as Captain Godell
- J. Farrell MacDonald as Will Whitten
- Frank Hagney as Lagune
- Edward Peil, Sr. as Lee Wing
- David Sharpe as Thad Dickery

== See also ==
- List of early sound feature films (1926–1929)
