= Green Gables (Palo Alto, California) =

Historic place in California, United States

- U.S. National Register of Historic Places
- U.S. Historic district
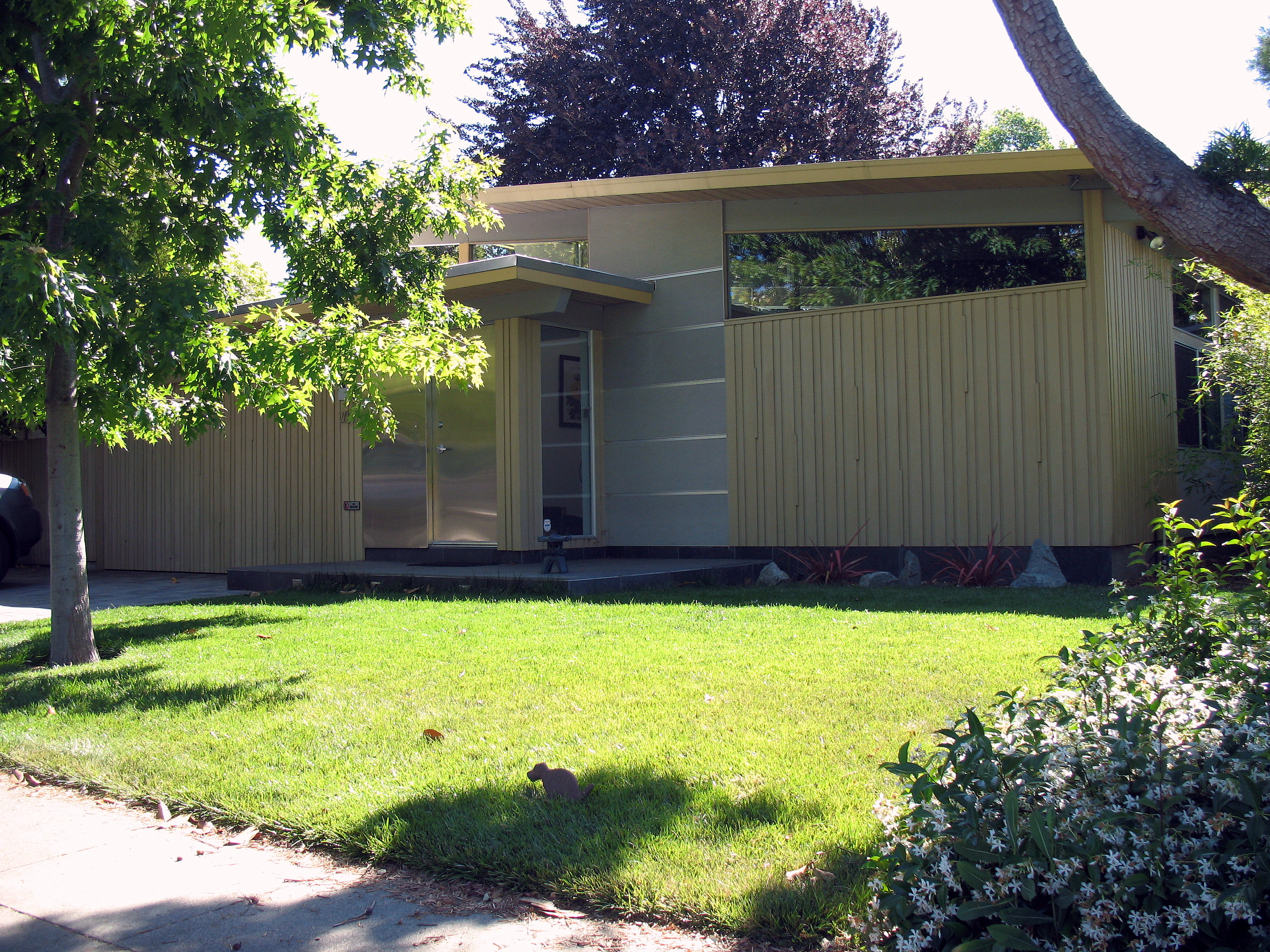
- Location: Palo Alto, California
- Coordinates: 37°26′45″N 122°7′27″W
- Architect: Joseph Eichler
- Architectural style: Mid-Century modern
- NRHP reference No.: 04000863
- Added to NRHP: July 28, 2005

Green Gables is a 1950s subdivision located in Palo Alto, California, United States. The subdivision was developed by Joseph Eichler, whose company built its first 63 homes in 1950. Eichler hired the architecture firm Anshen & Allen to design the one-story modernist houses. The houses in Green Gables represent Eichler's efforts to apply modernist principles to affordable single-family houses, which was considered a bold development strategy at the time. Contemporary critics acclaimed Eichler's work on Green Gables; Architectural Forum awarded it "Subdivision of the Year" in 1950 along with four of Eichler's other developments, and House Beautiful devoted a feature to the subdivision.

The subdivision was added to the National Register of Historic Places on July 28, 2005.
