= Croquet Hall of Fame =

Coordinates: 26.66538°N 80.07886°W

The United States Croquet Hall of Fame was established in 1979 by the Croquet Foundation of America to recognize individuals with exceptional skill in the sport of croquet or men and women who have contributed to the sport's health and growth. The Croquet Hall of Fame is located in West Palm Beach, Florida, at the headquarters of the United States Croquet Association, the National Croquet Center. Each year, new inductees to the Croquet Foundation of America's Hall of Fame are celebrated at a fund-raising dinner and ball usually held at the National Croquet Center.

Inductees to the Croquet Hall of Fame, by year:

- 1979

Margaret Emerson
Samuel Goldwyn
Averell Harriman
Moss Hart
Milton "Doc" Holden
George S. Kaufman
Harpo Marx
Dorothy Rodgers
Herbert Bayard Swope Sr.
Joseph Tankoos
Alexander Woollcott
Daryl Zanuck

- 1980

John David Griffin
Howard Hawks
John Lavalle
Suzie Linden
Duncan McMartin
Lillian Phipps
Richard Rodgers
Michael Romanoff
George Sanders
Gig Young

- 1981

George Abbott
Andrew Fuller
Louis Jourdan
Frederick Shock, Jr.
Herbert Bayard Swope, Jr.

- 1982

Raoul Fleischmann
Jean Negulesco
Edmund A. Prentis III
Francis Tayloe

- 1983

Paul Butler
William Harbach
Jack R. Osborn
Nelga Young
John Young II

- 1984

William Hawks
Richard Pearman
Archie Peck
Catherine Tankoos-Barrett

- 1985

Hilda McMartin
Elizabeth Newell

- 1986

Tom McDonnell

- 1987

Barton Gubelmann
Walter Gubelmann

- 1988

Cesare Danova
Ned Skinner
Frederick Supper

- 1989

E.A. "Teddy" Prentis IV
S. Cortland Wood

- 1990

Al Heath
Jim Lyons

- 1991

Jean Arrington
Patricia Supper

- 1992

Robert Clayton
Don Degnan
Lee A. Olsen

- 1993

Peyton Ballenger
Mack Penwell

- 1994

Rudulph E. (Foxy) Carter

- 1995

Archie Burchfield
W. Ellery McClatchy
Stan Patmor
Forrest Tucker

- 1996

John Donnell
Bill Hoy
Russ Ketcham

- 1997

James B. Miles

- 1998

James H.U. Hughes

- 1999

Michael Gibbons
Robert Kroeger

- 2000

Ray Bell
Reynold E. Kraft
Jerry Stark

- 2001

Charles P. Steuber

- 2002

Norma S. Truman

- 2003

Freeman A. (Bill) Berne
Billie Jean Berne

- 2004

William (Bill) W. Campbell

- 2005

Fred Jones
John C. Osborn

- 2006

John W. Curington

- 2007

Robert (Bob) Chilton

- 2008

Diane Blow
Jackie C. Jones

- 2009

Honoring all previous inductees

- 2010

Alexander Ix
Dr. William Luke
Margaret Mihlon

- 2011

Dan Mahoney
Rich Curtis
Richard Brackett

- 2012

Jack McMillin
Johnny Mitchell
Ruth Summers

- 2013

Charles Lazarus
Anne Frost Robinson
Rhys Thomas

- 2014

W. David McCoy
Ervand Peterson

- 2015

Shereen Hayes
Steve C Johnston
Mike Orgill

- 2016

Damon Bidencope
Albert J (Bert) Myer

- 2017

Digby Bridges

- 2018

Ben Rothman
Eugene F. “Gene” Young

- 2019

Harvey Geiger
Danny Huneycutt
John W. Solomon (posthumously)

- 2020

Sherif Abdelwahab
Rory J. Kelley

- 2021

Jim Bast
Mohammad Kamal

- 2022

David Ekstrom
Jacques Fournier

- 2023

Harold (Hal) Denton
Robert L (Bob) Alman (posthumously)

- 2024

Cheryl Bromley
Sara Low

- 2025

Doug Grimsley
Jeff Soo

- 2026

David Maloof
Carla P. Rueck (posthumously)

== See also ==
- United States Croquet Association
