= Green Gables (Melbourne, Florida) =

- U.S. National Register of Historic Places
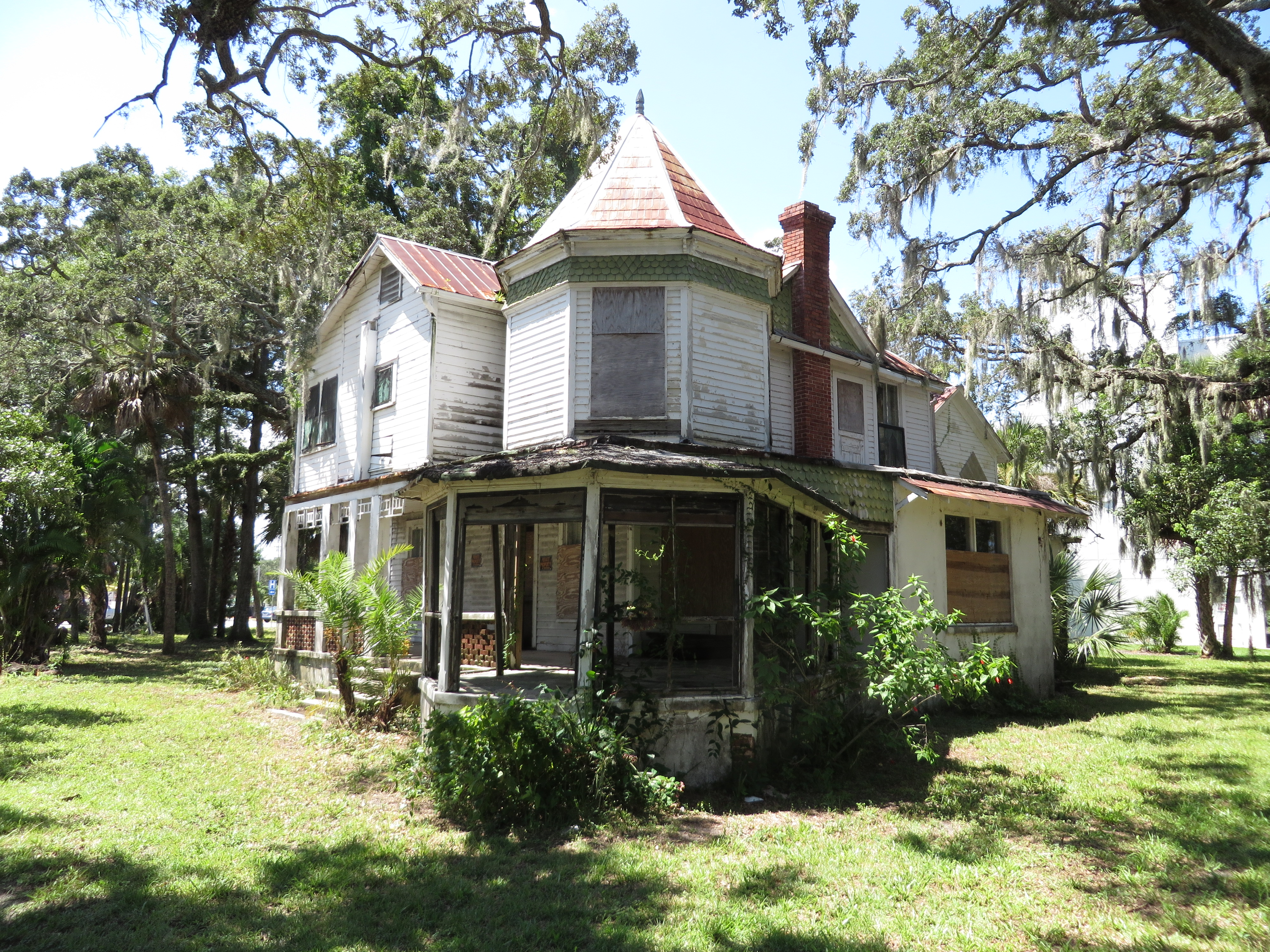
- Green Gables in 2014 prior to restoration

- Location within Florida Location within the United States
- Interactive map showing the location of Green Gables
- Location: 1501 South Harbor City Boulevard, Melbourne, Florida
- Coordinates: 28°5′6″N 80°36′22″W
- Architectural style: Queen Anne
- NRHP reference No.: 16000269
- Added to NRHP: May 18, 2016

Green Gables, also known as the Wells House, is a historic home at 1501 South Harbor City Boulevard in Melbourne, Florida, United States. The house fronts the Indian River and is one of a few Queen Anne style homes that still exist in Brevard County.

Local businessman William T. Wells purchased the property from the Strobah family, who were early landowners in Melbourne. He built the Green Gables in 1886 with his wife Nora Stanford Wells as a winter home.

Green Gables is an example of Queen Anne style architecture, and it is believed to be the first home in the area with indoor plumbing and an indoor bathroom. It was also one of the first homes in Melbourne to have electricity. It is a two-story, six-bedroom house with an octagon-shaped porch. On May 18, 2016, it was added to the U.S. National Register of Historic Places.

The original property was 150 acres that included the area now occupied by Wells Park and the Melbourne Public Library on East Fee Avenue and Hickory Street.

Green Gables was scheduled for demolition in 2015, but a group of local historians and community volunteers are working with the owners, fourth generation family members, to save the house due to its historical significance to the area. In May 2018, the Florida Trust for Historic Preservation included the house on its "11 to save list". The community needed $500,000 to salvage the house as of April 2020. In July 2022 Green Gables was awarded a $500,000 Special Category Grant from the Division of Historic Resources from the State of Florida. On June 12, 2023, Ownership of Green Gables was transferred to the non-profit organization of Green Gables at Historic Riverview Village.

== William Twining Wells ==
Wells was from New Jersey and New York, and owned the Wells Rustless Iron Company. Wells managed a pineapple plantation on the beach. He also donated 35 acres of land for a local park named Wells Park on East Hibiscus Boulevard and built the first auditorium, high school and library in Melbourne. His wife Nora was the niece of Leland Stanford, founder of Stanford University.

== References and external links ==
- Brevard County listings at National Register of Historic Places
