= Potter Estate =

Historic house in Massachusetts, United States

- U.S. National Register of Historic Places
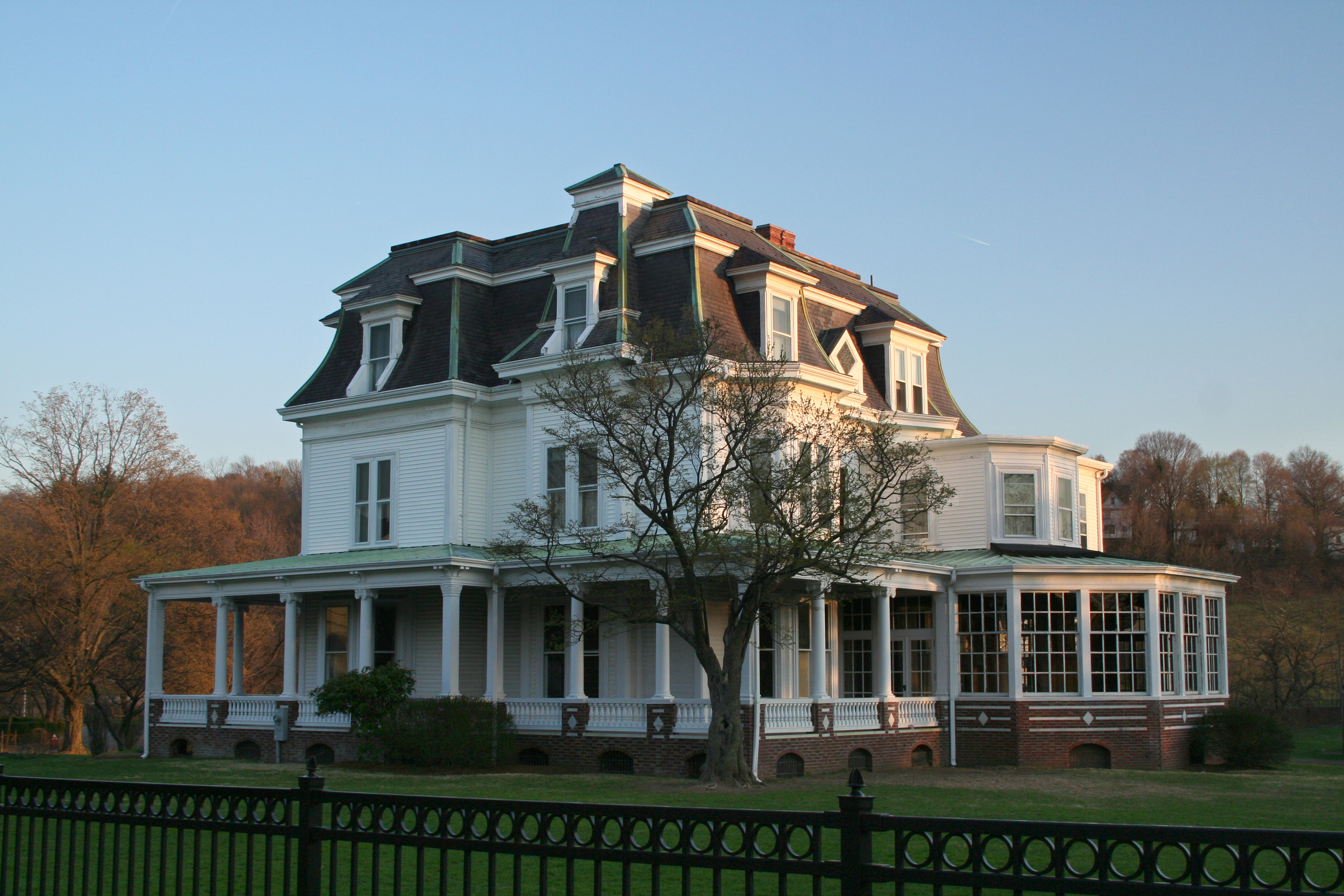

- Location within Massachusetts Location within the United States
- Location: 65-71 Walnut Pk., Newton, Massachusetts
- Coordinates: 42°21′24″N 71°11′42″W
- Built: 1867
- Architectural style: Second Empire, Mansard
- MPS: Newton MRA
- NRHP reference No.: 86001864
- Added to NRHP: December 23, 1986

The Potter Estate is a historic estate at 65-71 Walnut Park in Newton, Massachusetts. The centerpiece of the estate is a large Second Empire mansion house which was constructed in 1867 by John Potter, Jr., a shoe and leather businessman. It has a mansard roof characteristic of the style, bracketed eaves, and a single-story wraparound porch that is a later Colonial Revival addition. The estate includes several outbuildings dating to Potter's time, including a carriage house and gardener's cottage; the estate also has period cast iron fencing.

The estate was added to the National Register of Historic Places in 1986.

== See also ==
- National Register of Historic Places listings in Newton, Massachusetts
