= Such Men Are Dangerous =

1930 film

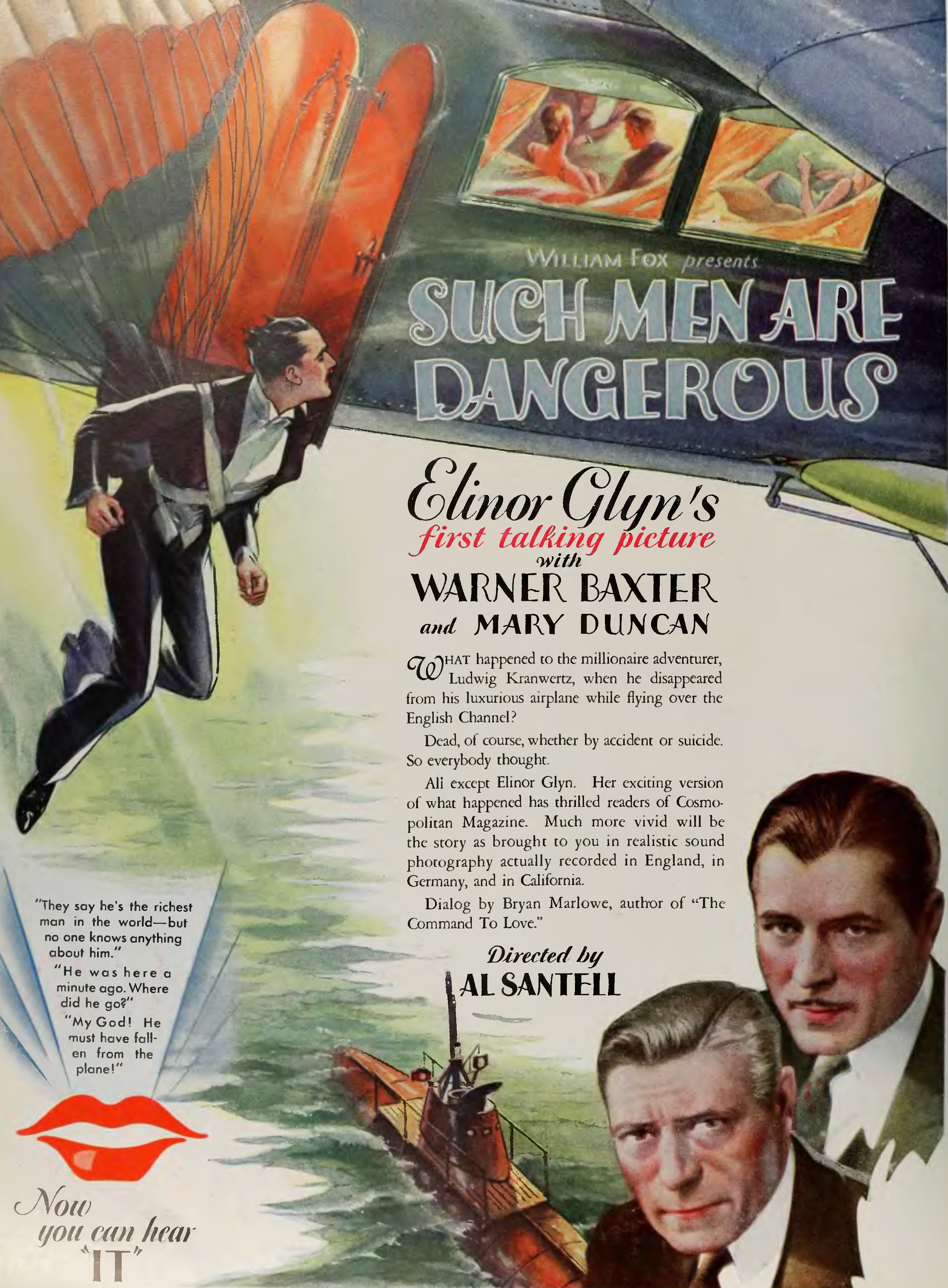
- Theatrical release poster
- Directed by: Kenneth Hawks
- Screenplay by: Ernest Vajda
- Story by: Elinor Glyn
- Produced by: Al Rockett; William Fox
- Starring: Warner Baxter; Catherine Dale Owen; Hedda Hopper; Claud Allister; Albert Conti; Bela Lugosi
- Cinematography: George Eastman; L. William O'Connell; Conrad Wells
- Edited by: Harold D. Schuster
- Production company: Fox Film Corporation
- Distributed by: Fox Film Corporation
- Release date: March 9, 1930
- Running time: 83 minutes
- Country: United States
- Language: English

Such Men Are Dangerous (a.k.a. The Mask of Love) is a 1930 American pre-Code drama film directed by Kenneth Hawks and written by Ernest Vajda. The film is based on a novella by Elinor Glyn who based her story on the 1928 real-life disappearance of Belgian banker Alfred Loewenstein who vanished on a flight over the English Channel. Such Men Are Dangerous stars Warner Baxter, Catherine Dale Owen, Hedda Hopper, Claud Allister, Albert Conti and Bela Lugosi. Shortly after a midair collision killed 10 crew members in the "worst air accident in film history", Such Men Are Dangerous was released on March 9, 1930, by Fox Film Corporation.

== Plot ==
Elinor, encouraged by her ambitious sister, reluctantly agrees to marry wealthy businessman Ludwig Kranz. However she is repulsed by his unattractive physical appearance and his aloof, materialistic personality. Unable to go through with consummating the marriage, Elinor flees on their wedding night.

Kranz angrily plots revenge, hiring an aircraft and heading out over the English Channel where he abandons the aircraft by parachute in order to fake his own death. Kranz goes to Berlin and bribes a plastic surgeon, Dr. Goodman, to re-model his facial features. After months of work, Kranz is transformed into a different, and much more handsome, looking man. With a fake identity, Kranz returns to England and seeks out Elinor with the intention of seducing and then humiliating her. With his new face, Kranz adopts a warmer, more charming manner and inwardly his previously dour character begins to soften. Elinor falls in love with him and to his surprise, he discovers his feelings for her are heading the same way.

Kranz realizes that Elinor never married him for his wealth and that it was the cold, heartless manner of his prior self that drove her away the first time. Kranz decides he is prepared to forget the past and embarks on his new life and love with Elinor.

== Cast ==
- Warner Baxter as Ludwig Kranz / Pierre Villard
- Catherine Dale Owen as Elinor Kranz
- Hedda Hopper as Muriel Wyndham
- Claud Allister as Fred Wyndham
- Albert Conti as Paul Strohm
- Bela Lugosi as plastic surgeon Dr. Goodman

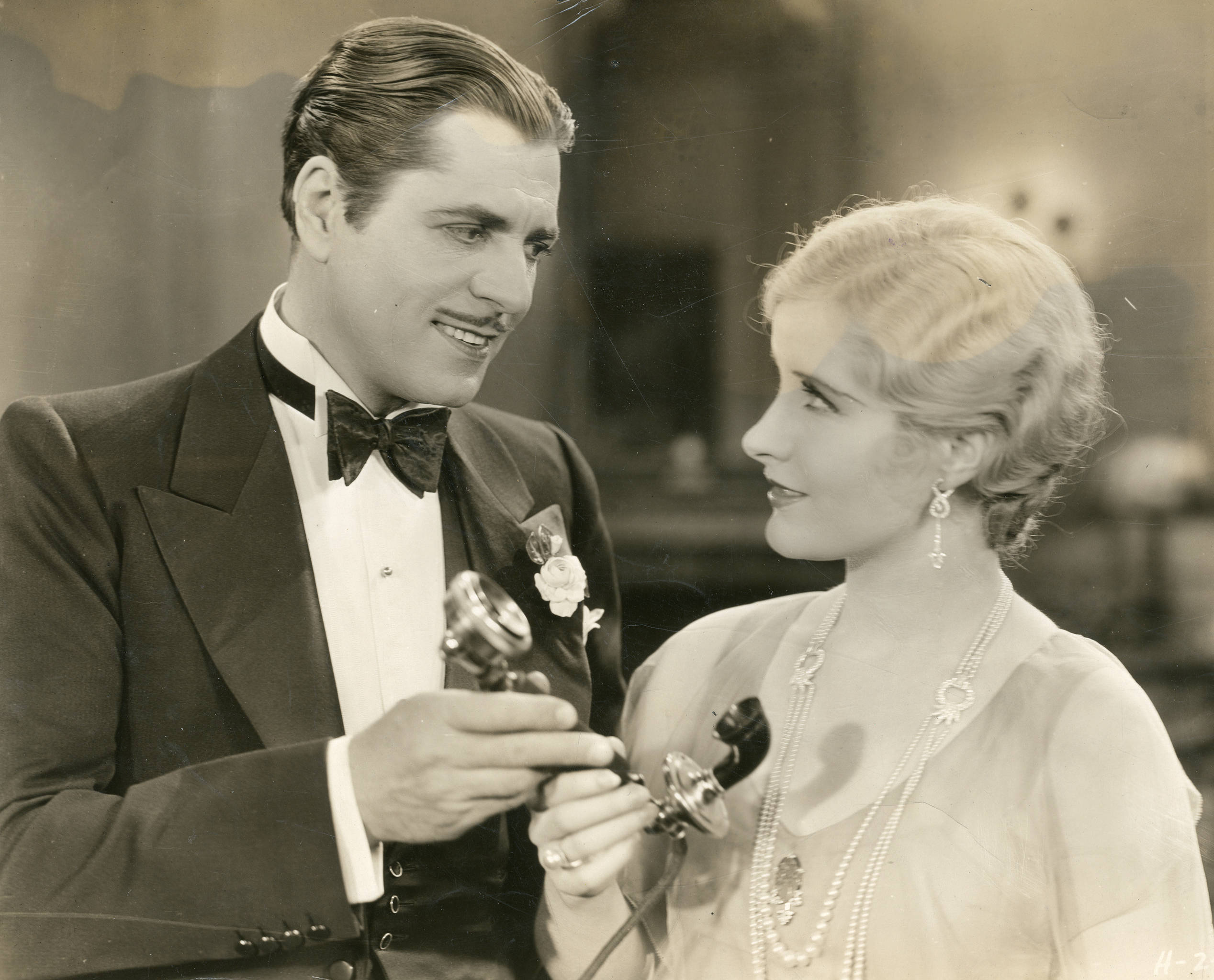
Warner Baxter and Catherine Dale Owen in publicity still of Such Men Are Dangerous

== Production ==
On January 2, 1930, during aerial filming, a short distance off the Californian coast near Santa Monica, two Stinson Detroiter aircraft employed as camera platforms collided whilst filming the parachute jump scene. According to witnesses on a nearby beach, the wingtips of the aircraft touched.

The two aircraft swung together, colliding and bursting into flame. Both aircraft crashed into the ocean, killing all 10 men on board including director Kenneth Hawks (the brother of Howard Hawks), cinematographer Conrad Wells, assistant director Max Gold, cameramen Otho Jordan and Ben Frankel, two property men and the two pilots, one of whom was an Army Reserve flier. Only five of the bodies were recovered.

Because the accident occurred on one of the last days of filming, the movie was completed and released on schedule. A coroner's inquiry into the incident did not attach blame to any specific incident or person. (Note: The third aircraft that carried the parachute jumper was flown by famed air race pilot Roscoe Turner who was a shocked observer.)

== Reception ==
Such Men Are Dangerous received mixed reviews. Mordaunt Hall, writing in The New York Times, praised the screenplay of The Mask of Love, the initial title as reviewed, saying that Ernest Vajda has done "exceedingly well with a minimum number of words". He also praised the cast, in particular Bela Lugosi for his "sincere" performance as Dr. Goodman.
