= United States Croquet Association =

The United States Croquet Association (USCA) fosters croquet in all its forms, from the familiar nine-wicket croquet game to the modern sport of six-wicket croquet. There are USCA-affiliated clubs and tournaments across the United States and Canada. The official rules of American Croquet are maintained by the USCA. The USCA is a member of the World Croquet Federation.

The USCA is headquartered at the National Croquet Center, 700 Florida Mango Road, West Palm Beach, Florida. It has a full-time office staff which keeps regular weekday hours. The USCA provides information on starting a club and print resources, consultation on lawn construction, and maintenance.

== History ==
Croquet in the United States dates back to at least 1853, with the first match played at the Punahou School in Honolulu, Hawaii, while the first known croquet court in the nation opened in Nahant, Massachusetts, in 1859. Although croquet remained popular in the Commonwealth countries, in the United States the sport devolved mostly into a backyard pastime with no universal rules. In 1977, Jack Osborn's vision and enthusiasm led to the organization of five Eastern clubs, including the Croquet Club of Bermuda, Green Gables Croquet Club, New York Croquet Club, Palm Beach Croquet Club, and Westhampton Mallet Club. These clubs formed the core of the United States Croquet Association (USCA) and worked to develop rules which each of the five clubs would agree upon. They eventually published a new rule book, which established American Rules croquet. Since then, the list has grown to nearly 400 member clubs with 3,500 members, and the rules have survived with minor periodic adjustments.

The USCA opened its current headquarters in West Palm Beach, Florida, in February 2002, although the facility began hosting tournaments one month prior. Named the Charles P. Steuber National Croquet Center – in honor of the Croquet Foundation of America president and 2001 Croquet Hall of Fame inductee – the center cost approximately $5 million to construct and includes a 19,000 sq ft (1,800 m^{2}) clubhouse, 12 lawns, and 4 gazebos.
