= Venues of the 1988 Summer Olympics =

Seoul's Olympic Stadium in 2005

For the 1988 Summer Olympics, a total of thirty-one sports venues were used. South Korea hosted its first World Championships in 1978 in shooting sports. Three years later, Seoul was awarded the 1988 Summer Olympics. Many of the venues constructed for the 1988 Games were completed two years earlier in time for the Asian Games. The 1986 Asian Games served as test events for the 1988 Summer Olympics. The men's marathon course was lined by 36,000 policemen. Steffi Graf won a gold medal in women's singles to complete the "Golden Slam". None of the football venues used for these games were used for the 2002 FIFA World Cup that Korea co-hosted with Japan.

== Venues ==
=== Seoul Sports Complex ===
| Venue | Sports | Capacity | Ref. |
|---|---|---|---|
| Jamsil Baseball Stadium | Baseball (demonstration) | 30,306 | |
| Jamsil Gymnasium | Basketball, Volleyball (final) | 13,409 | |
| Jamsil Indoor Swimming Pool | Diving, Modern pentathlon (swimming), Swimming, Synchronized swimming, Water polo | 8,000 | |
| Jamsil Students' Gymnasium | Boxing | 7,500 | |
| Seoul Olympic Stadium | Athletics, Equestrian (jumping individual final), Football (final) | 69,950 | |

=== Olympic Park ===
| Venue | Sports | Capacity | Ref. |
|---|---|---|---|
| Mongchon Tosong | Modern pentathlon (running) | 10,000 | |
| Olympic Fencing Gymnasium | Fencing, Modern pentathlon (fencing) | 7,000 | |
| Olympic Gymnastics Hall | Gymnastics | 14,730 | |
| Olympic Tennis Center | Tennis | 15,000 | |
| Olympic Velodrome | Cycling (track) | 6,000 | |
| Olympic Weightlifting Gymnasium | Weightlifting | 4,000 | |

=== New venues ===
| Venue | Sports | Capacity | Ref. |
|---|---|---|---|
| Busan Yachting Center | Sailing | 80 | |
| Han River Regatta Course/Canoeing Site | Canoeing, Rowing | 25,000 | |
| Hanyang University Gymnasium | Volleyball preliminaries | 8,000 | |
| Saemaul Sports Hall | Volleyball preliminaries | 4,500 | |
| Sangmu Gymnasium | Wrestling | 5,000 | |
| Seoul Equestrian Park | Equestrian (all but jumping individual final), Modern pentathlon (riding) | 30,000 | |
| Seoul National University Gymnasium | Badminton (demonstration), table tennis | 5,000 | |
| Suwon Gymnasium | Handball | 6,000 | |

=== Existing venues ===
| Venue | Sports | Capacity | Ref. |
|---|---|---|---|
| Hwarang Archery Field | Archery | 1,200 | |
| Jangchung Gymnasium | Judo, Taekwondo (demonstration) | 7,000 | |
| Royal Bowling Center | Bowling (demonstration) | Not listed. | |
| Seongnam Stadium | Field hockey | 23,262 | |
| Streets of Seoul | Athletics (20 km/ 50 km walk, marathon) | Not listed. | |
| Taenung International Shooting Range | Modern pentathlon (shooting), Shooting | 2,505 | |
| Tongillo Road Course | Cycling (individual road race, road team time trial) | 800 | |

=== Football venues ===
| Venue | Sports | Capacity | Ref. |
|---|---|---|---|
| Busan Stadium | Football preliminaries | 30,000 | |
| Daegu Stadium | Football preliminaries | 23,278 | |
| Daejeon Stadium | Football preliminaries | 30,000 | |
| Dongdaemun Stadium | Football preliminaries | 26,383 | |
| Gwangju Stadium | Football preliminaries | 30,000 | |

== Before the Olympics ==
The oldest venue, Dongdaemun Stadium, was built in 1926. The stadium underwent three renovations between 1926 and the 1988 Summer Olympics. Busan Goodek Stadium was built in 1928. Dageu Stadium was constructed in 1948 and renovated in 1975. Daejeon Stadium was completed in 1964.

Taenung International Shooting Range was constructed in 1972 following the Summer Olympics that took place in Munich. Six years later, the venue made history by becoming the first to host a world championships for shooting sports. This venue was renovated in 1987-8 before the 1988 Games to comply with International Shooting Sport Federation (ISSF, then Union International de Tir (UIT)) standards.

Jangchung Gymnasium hosted the 1979 FIBA World Championship for Women.

The success of the UIT World Shooting Championships that year led to the formation of a bid committee to bring the 1988 Games to Seoul. Among Seoul's competitors were Melbourne, Australia (who also bidded for the 1988 Summer Paralympics in a different process, host of the 1956 Summer Olympics, and Nagoya, Japan. Seoul submitted its bid to the International Olympic Committee (IOC) in late 1980 though Melbourne withdrew its bid in early 1981. At the 1981 IOC meeting in Baden-Baden, West Germany (Germany since October 1990), the IOC selected Seoul to host the 1988 Summer Olympics.

Venues for the Seoul Sports Complex were constructed between 1973 and 1984. Except for Mongchon Tosong and the Tongillo Road Course, all of the other venues were completed or renovated by the summer of 1986. The fact that the city was preparing to host the 1986 Asian Games was well regarded, as much of the infrastructure built for the event would be reused and the event was seen as the big test.

== During the Olympics ==
The men's marathon course was run in hot weather along a route lined with 36,000 police personnel. At the Han River Regatta Course/ Canoeing Site during the men's K-1 1000 m canoeing event, it was announced that Australia's Grant Davies had won the event, but that was reversed a few minutes later by a jury of the International Canoe Federation that American Greg Barton had won the event in a photo finish by 0.005 seconds. In the men's rowing coxless fours final, the Soviet team finished last to one of their seats breaking in the middle of the race.

During the fifth race of the sailing Finn event near Busan, Canada's Lawrence Lemieux was in second place when he noticed Joseph Chan of Singapore in the water 25 yd (23 m) from his capsized boat. Lemieux abandoned his position and rescued Chan and Chan's Singapore teammate. Even though Lemieux finished last in the race, the IOC gave him second place for the race as a result of Lemieux's heroic efforts. Lemieux would be awarded the IOC Pierre de Coubertin medal at the Finn medal awards ceremony by President Juan Antonio Samaranch.

The tennis venue for the women's singles event witnessed West Germany's Steffi Graf defeating Argentina's Gabriella Sabatini to win the "Golden Slam", including the Grand Slam events in Australia, France, Wimbledon, and the United States.

== After the Olympics ==
Olympic Stadium continues to be of use to many events as of 2010. When Korea co-hosted the 2002 FIFA World Cup with Japan, none of the 1988 Summer Olympic venues used for football were used for those events. Dongdaemun Stadium was demolished in 2008.
