= 2018 Winter Paralympics opening ceremony =

- Part of 2018 Winter Paralympics
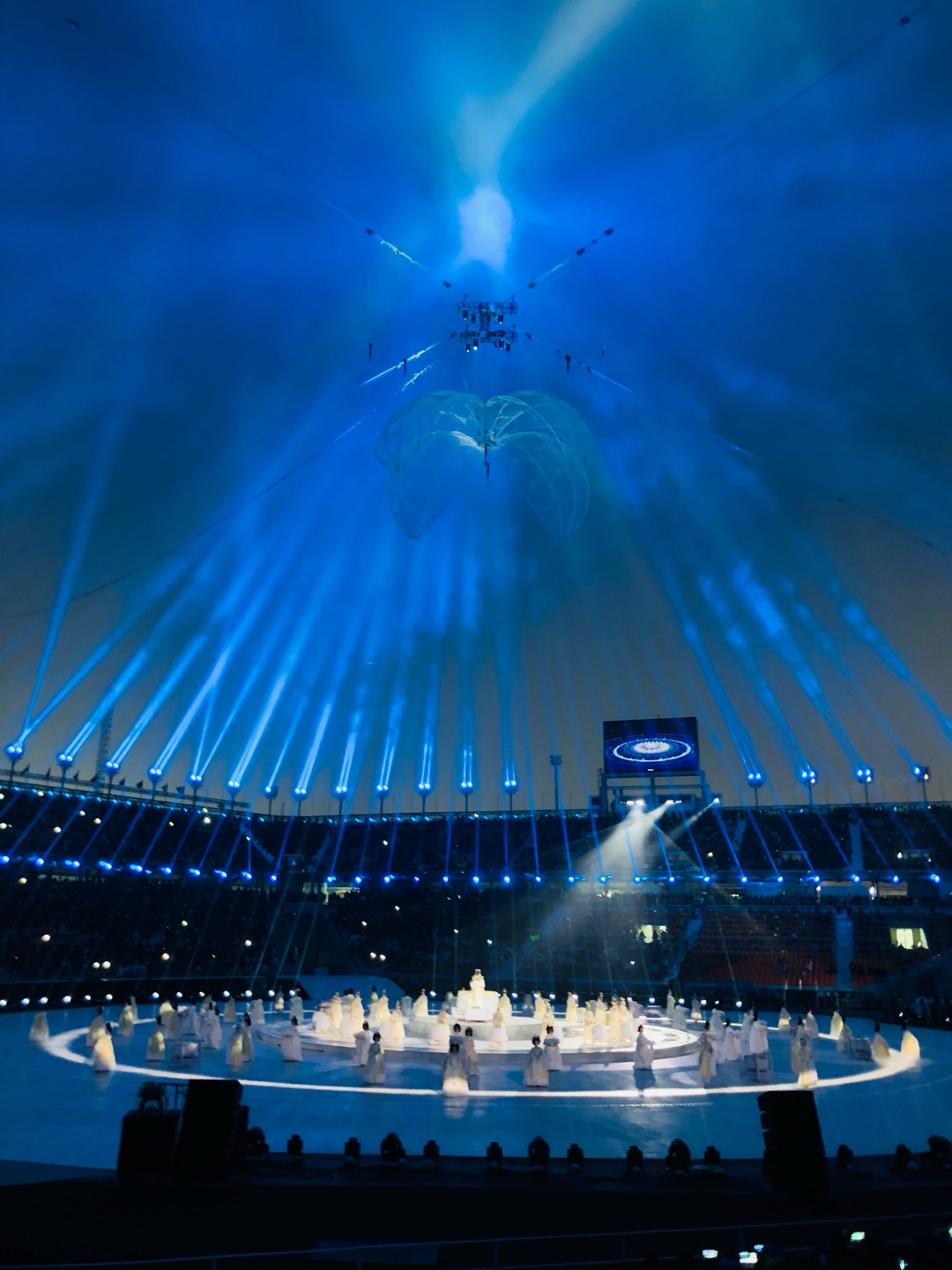
- Pyeongchang Olympic Stadium
- Date: 9 March 2018
- Time: 20:00–22:10 KST (UTC+9)
- Venue: Pyeongchang Olympic Stadium
- Location: Pyeongchang, South Korea; 37°40′03″N 128°42′20″E
- Filmed by: Olympic Broadcasting Services (OBS)
- Footage: The ceremony on the IPC YouTube channel on YouTube

The opening ceremony of the 2018 Winter Paralympics took place at the Pyeongchang Olympic Stadium in Pyeongchang, South Korea on March 9, 2018. at 20:00 KST

== Preparations ==
The site of the opening ceremony, Pyeongchang Olympic Stadium, was built specifically for the games. It seated 35,000. No Olympic or Paralympic events were held there. It was only used for the opening and closing ceremonies.

== Proceedings ==
=== Parade of Nations ===
Competing countries entered the stadium in alphabetical order based on their names in the Korean language, with the host country, South Korea, concluding the march. Coincidentally similar to the Olympics, Greece enters at the start of the parade.

== Dignitaries in attendance ==
- South Korea President of Korea Moon Jae-in and First Lady Kim Jung-Sook
- USA United States Secretary of Homeland Security Kirstjen Nielsen

== Anthems ==
- Korean Wheelchair Choir – South Korean National Anthem
- Seoul Philharmonic Orchestra – Paralympic Hymn

== See also ==
- 2018 Winter Paralympics closing ceremony
- 2018 Winter Olympics opening ceremony
- 2018 Winter Olympics closing ceremony
- 1988 Summer Olympics opening ceremony
- 1988 Summer Olympics closing ceremony
