= List of Summer Olympics venues: Q–R =

For the Summer Olympics, there are four venues starting with the letter 'Q' and 29 venues starting with the letter 'R'.

== Q ==
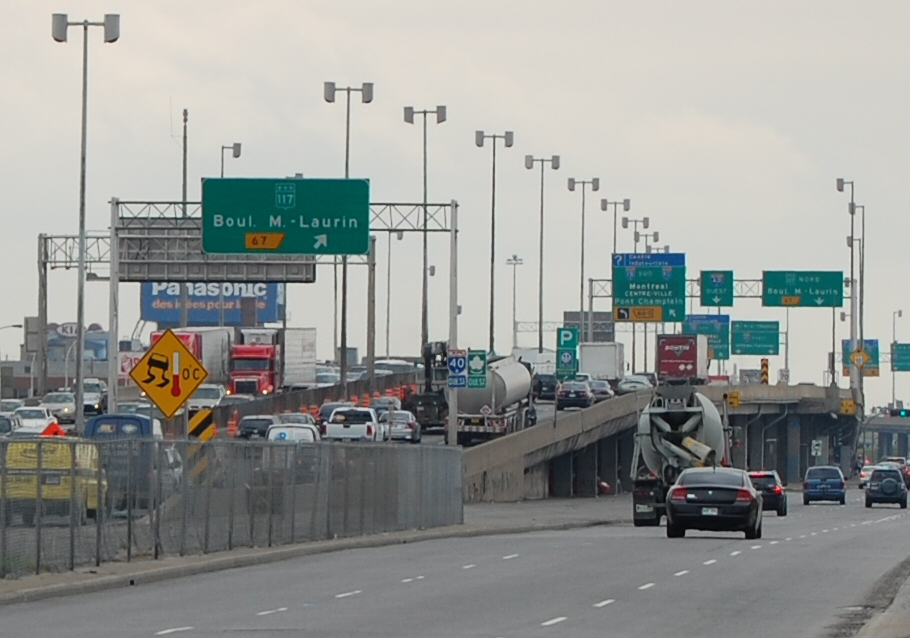
Quebec Autoroute 40 and Chemin de la Côte-de-Liesse in 2009. A 25 km (16 mi) stretch of the route was used for the cycling road team time trial event at the 1976 Summer Olympics in neighboring Montreal.

Venue	Games	Sports	Capacity	Ref.
Qingdao International Sailing Centre	2008 Beijing	Sailing	Not listed.	
Qinhuangdao Olympic Sports Center Stadium	2008 Beijing	Football	33,572	
Quebec Autoroute 40	1976 Montreal	Cycling (road team time trial)	Not listed.	
Queen's Club	1908 London	Jeu de paume	Not listed.	

== R ==
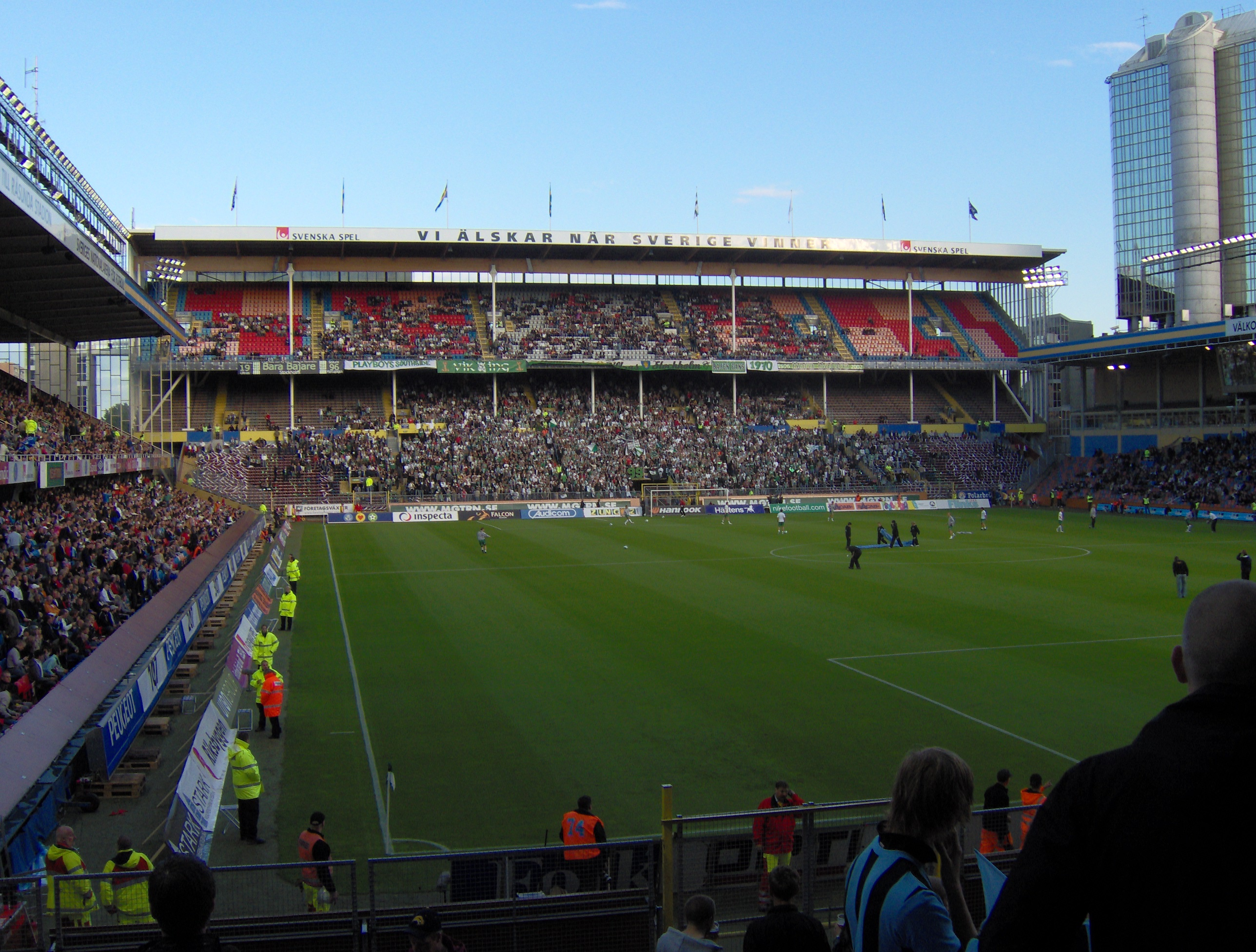
Råsunda Stadium in 2007. For the 1912 Summer Olympics in neighboring Stockholm, the venue hosted some of the football and shooting events.

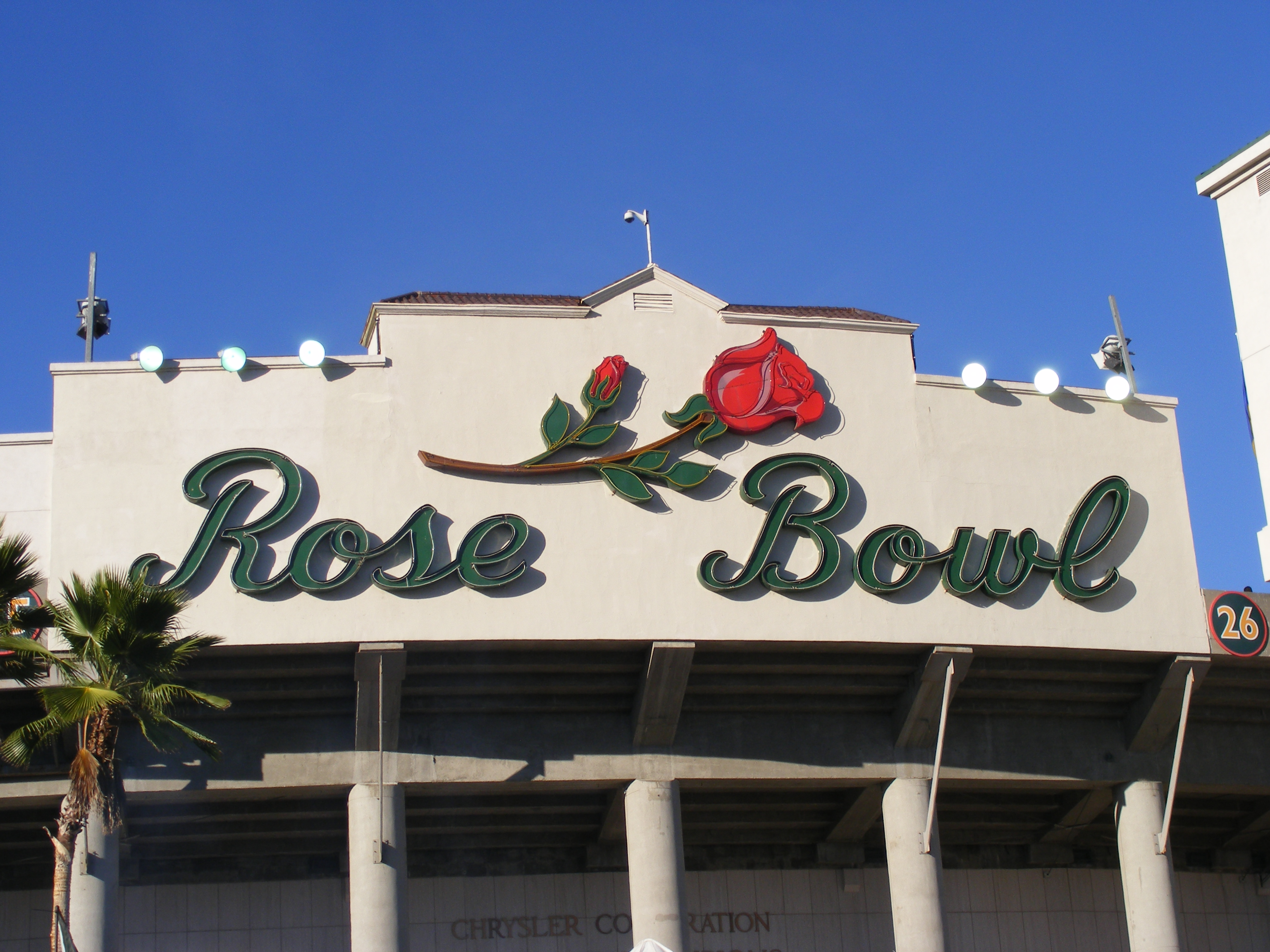
Main entrance to the Rose Bowl Stadium in 2008. For the 1932 Summer Olympics in Los Angeles, the venue hosted track cycling events. Fifty-two years later, the venue hosted the football final.

Venue	Games	Sports	Capacity	Ref.
Raccordo Anulare	1960 Rome	Athletics (marathon)	Not listed.	
Radstadion	1972 Munich	Cycling (track)	4,157	
Raleigh Runnels Memorial Pool	1984 Los Angeles	Water polo	5,000	
Råsunda Stadium	1912 Stockholm	Football, Shooting	Not listed.	
RCD Espanyol Stadium	1992 Barcelona	Football	42,000	
Real Club de Polo de Barcelona	1992 Barcelona	Equestrian (dressage, jumping, eventing final), Modern pentathlon (riding)	9,600	
Regattastrecke Oberschleißheim	1972 Munich	Canoeing (sprint), Rowing	41,000	
Regent's Park	2012 London	Cycling (road)	Not listed.	
Republican Stadium	1980 Moscow	Football	80,000	
Reserva de Marapendi	2016 Rio de Janeiro	Golf	Not listed.	
Revolution Ice Rink	1968 Mexico City	Volleyball	1,500	
Riding Facility, Riem	1972 Munich	Equestrian (jumping individual, eventing cross-country), Modern pentathlon (riding)	23,000	
Riocentro – Pavilion 2	2016 Rio de Janeiro	Boxing	9,000	
Riocentro – Pavilion 3	2016 Rio de Janeiro	Table tennis	7,000	
Riocentro – Pavilion 4	2016 Rio de Janeiro	Badminton	6,500	
Riocentro – Pavilion 6	2016 Rio de Janeiro	Weightlifting	6,500	
Riverbank Arena	2012 London	Field hockey	16,000	
Riverside Drive at Griffith Park	1932 Los Angeles	Athletics (50 km walk)	Not listed.	
Riviera Country Club	1932 Los Angeles	Equestrian (dressage, eventing), Modern pentathlon (riding)	9,500	
Robert F. Kennedy Memorial Stadium	1996 Atlanta	Football	56,500	
Rose Bowl	1932 Los Angeles	Cycling (track)	85,000	
Rose Bowl	1984 Los Angeles	Football (final)	103,300	
Rose Bowl	2028 Los Angeles	Football	92,542	
Rosenaustadion	1972 Munich	Football	28,000	
Royal Artillery Barracks	2012 London	Modern pentathlon (shooting), Shooting	7,500	
Royal Australian Air Force, Laverton Air Base	1956 Melbourne	Shooting (shotgun)	Not listed	
Royal Bowling Center	1988 Seoul	Bowling (demonstration)	Not listed.	
Royal Exhibition Building	1956 Melbourne	Basketball (final), Modern pentathlon (fencing), Weightlifting, Wrestling	3,500	
Royal Military Academy	1948 London	Modern pentathlon (running)	Not listed.	
Ruhleben	1936 Berlin	Modern pentathlon (shooting)	Not listed.	
Ruskeasuo Equestrian Hall	1952 Helsinki	Equestrian (dressage, eventing)	Not listed.	
Ryde Aquatic Leisure Centre	2000 Sydney	Water polo (women's final)	3,900	
