= Bowling at the Summer Olympics =

- IOC Code: BWL
- Governing body: IBF
- Events: 2 (men: 1; women: 1; mixed: 0)

Summer Olympics
- 1896; 1900; 1904; 1908; 1912; 1920; 1924; 1928; 1932; 1936; 1948; 1952; 1956; 1960; 1964; 1968; 1972; 1976; 1980; 1984; 1988; 1992; 1996; 2000; 2004; 2008; 2012; 2016; 2020; 2024; 2028; 2032; Note: demonstration or exhibition sport years indicated in italics
- Medalists

Bowling was featured in the Summer Olympic Games as a demonstration event in 1988 at Seoul's Royal Bowling Center. A total of 20 nations competed in the men's and women's tournament. No bowling professionals competed.

== Post-1988 lobby ==
The first multi-sport event in which bowling was contested as an official sport was the 1978 Asian Games in Bangkok, Thailand. Bowling has been an official sport at every quadrennial World Games from the first edition in 1981 in the United States, including the 2017 World Games in Wroclaw, Poland. The sport was removed from the Asian Games program for the 1982 Games in Delhi, India, but returned four years later in the 1986 Games in Seoul, South Korea. The public interest in this edition of the Asian Games was resounding. As a result the bowling industry lobbied long and hard for bowling to be recognized as a potential Olympic sport and a demonstration sport for future Games, but the outcome was not successful. A negative factor is that bowling lacks inexpensive or easy access for youth in the underdeveloped world to acquire skill and proficiency. However, after its first demonstration appearance at the Americas-exclusive 1983 Pan American Games, bowling appeared as an official sport with full medal status at the 1991 Pan American Games on August 2, 1991, in Havana, Cuba. The medal-level competition has been held at every Pan American Games since then, including the 2019 Games held in Lima, Peru.

== Sport for the 2020 Summer Olympics ==
On 22 June 2015, it was announced that bowling made the cut from the 28 sports to the last eight to become a new sport for the 2020 Summer Olympics. The shortlist of these sports for consideration was based on applications from 26 international sport federations, many of which have applied for inclusion in previous Olympic tournaments. However, in September 2015, it was announced that bowling, together with wushu and squash, were left out for 2020. The 2020 Olympic Committee wanted sports that appealed to youth and that did not require building new facilities to reduce cost.
