= 1988 Summer Olympics closing ceremony =

- Part of 1988 Summer Olympics
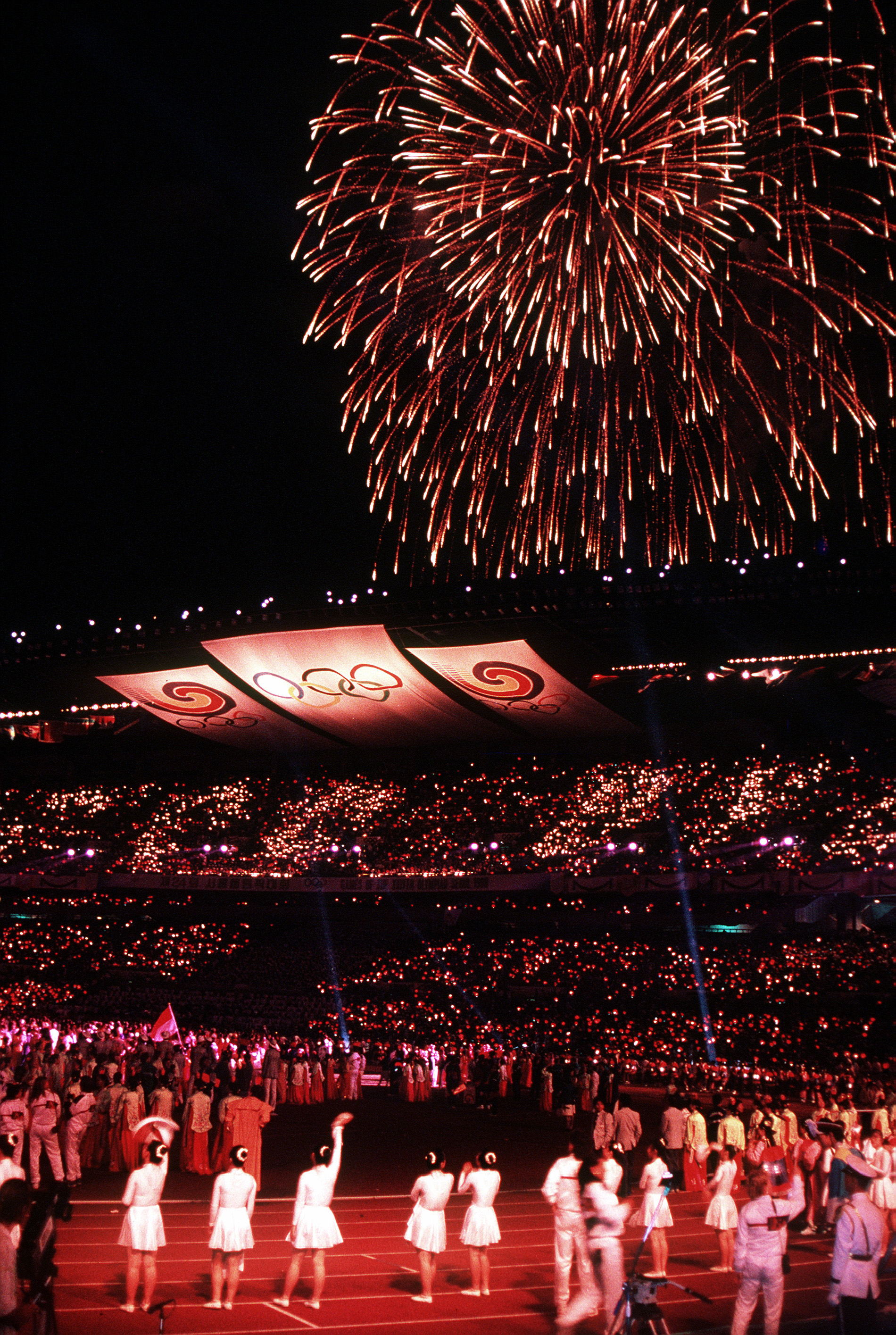
- Fireworks at the closing ceremonies of the 1988 Summer Games
- Date: 2 October 1988
- Time: 19:00 — 20:45 KDT (UTC+10).
- Venue: Seoul Olympic Stadium
- Location: Seoul, South Korea; 37°30′57.1″N 127°04′22.1″E
- Filmed by: Seoul Olympic Radio and Television Organization (SORTO)

The closing ceremony of the 1988 Summer Olympics took place at Seoul Olympic Stadium in Seoul, South Korea, on 2 October 1988 at 19:00 — 20:45 KDT (UTC+10).

== Ceremony ==
The closing ceremony was held on the eve of National Foundation Day, a traditional holiday in South Korea.

=== Parade of Athletes ===
The flag bearers of 159 National Olympic Committees arrived into the Seoul Olympic Stadium. The flag bearers from each participating country entered the stadium informally in single file, ordered by ganada order of the Korean alphabet, and behind them marched all the athletes, without any distinction or grouping by nationality.

=== Barcelona 1992: A city who is turning to the sea ===
Barcelona, the host city of the 1992 Summer Olympic Games.

=== Closing speeches and Olympic flag handover ===
SLOOG President Park Seh-jik delivered a speech in Korean concluding the Games and thanking everyone for their attendance. IOC President Juan Antonio Samaranch delivered a speech in English and French awarding the Olympic Order in Gold to Park Seh-jik, President of the Seoul Organizing Committee. The IOC President declared the Games of the XXIV Olympiad in Seoul closed, and in accordance with tradition, called upon the youth of the world to assemble 4 years from now in Barcelona, to celebrate the Games of the XXV Olympiad. The Mayor of Seoul, Kim Yong-rae, handed over the Olympic flag to IOC President Juan Antonio Samaranch, who then handed it over to the Mayor of Barcelona, Pasqual Maragall. The flag was raised again on 8 February 1992 in Albertville for the opening ceremony of the 1992 Winter Olympics.

== Dignitaries in attendance ==
=== International organizations ===
- International Olympic Committee –
  - President of the International Olympic Committee Juan Antonio Samaranch and Members of the IOC

=== Host country ===
- South Korea –
  - President of the Seoul Olympic Organizing Committee Park Seh-jik
  - President of the Republic of Korea Roh Tae-woo
  - First Lady of the Republic of Korea Kim Ok-suk
  - Mayor of Seoul Kim Yong-rae

=== Foreign dignitaries ===
- Spain – President of the Barcelona'92 Olympic Organising Committee and Mayor of Barcelona Pasqual Maragall

== Anthems ==
- National Anthem of Greece - U S. Army Band (1984 recording)
- National Anthem of South Korea
- National Anthem of Spain
- (International Olympic Committee) Olympic Hymn
