= 1988 Summer Olympics opening ceremony =

- Part of 1988 Summer Olympics
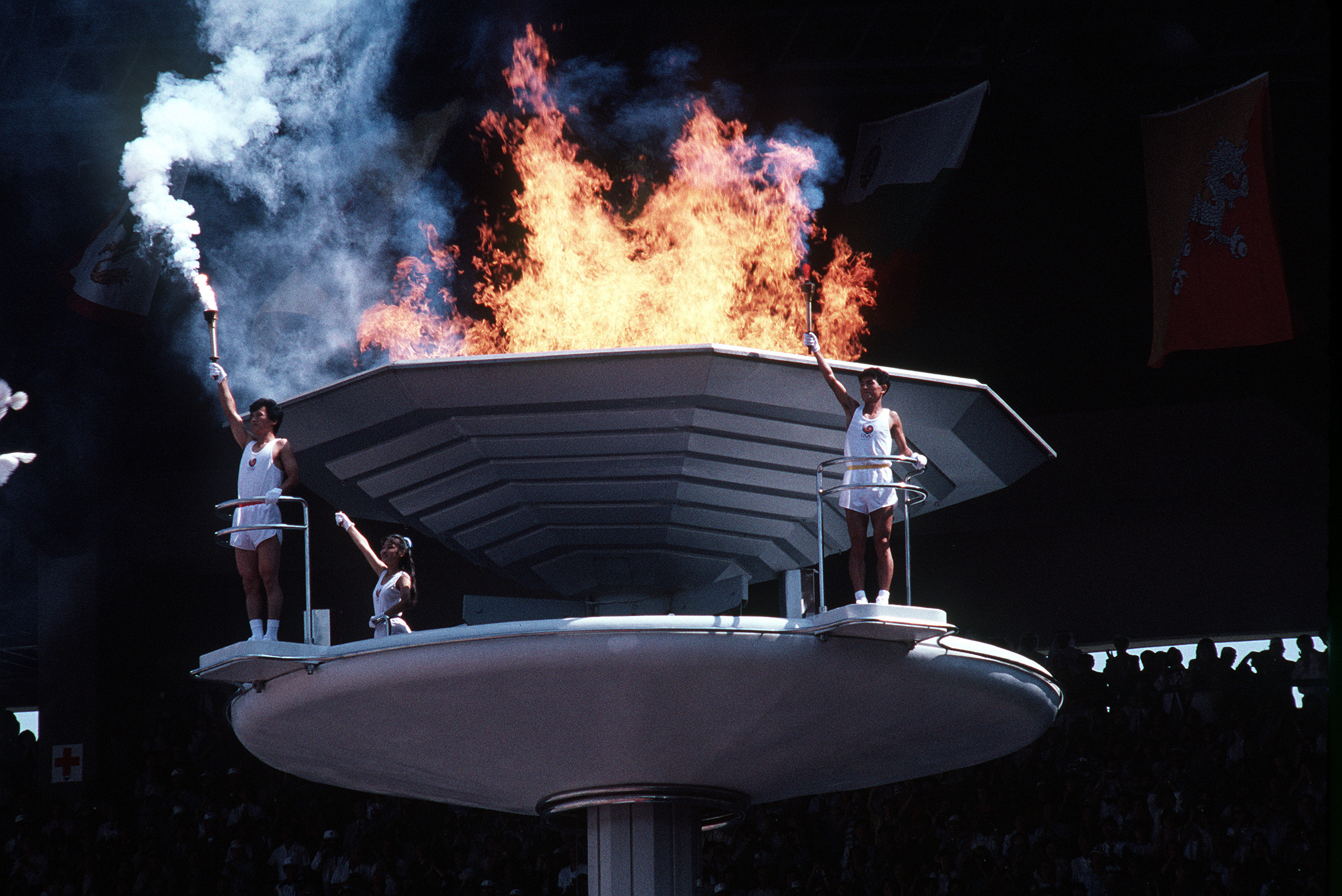
- The Olympic flame at the opening ceremony
- Date: 17 September 1988
- Time: 10:30 – 13:47 KDT (UTC+10)
- Venue: Seoul Olympic Stadium
- Location: Seoul, South Korea; 37°30′57.1″N 127°04′22.1″E
- Filmed by: Seoul Olympic Radio and Television Organization (SORTO)
- Footage: Seoul 1988 Opening Ceremony - Full Length on YouTube

The opening ceremony of the 1988 Summer Olympics took place at Seoul Olympic Stadium in Seoul, South Korea, on 17 September 1988 at 10:30 KDT (UTC+10). The official song of this game was "Hand in Hand", which was performed by Koreana. The Games were officially opened by President of the Republic of Korea Roh Tae-woo.

To date, this is the most recent summer opening ceremony to be held entirely during the daytime, the most recent to include the release of live doves (see below), and the most recent in which the athletes departed the stadium prior to the conclusion of the ceremony. As the final Olympic Games of the Cold War, this was the last opening ceremony to include athletes from the Soviet Union and East Germany; the last to include delegations from Communist-era Poland and Romania, among others; and the last not to include independent delegations from the Post-Soviet states.

== Background ==
Every Olympic Games of the modern era has included an opening ceremony; however, prior to 1980, these tended to be more simplified and formal affairs than have become the subsequent norm. In 1976, for example, despite the presence of Queen Elizabeth II, the opening ceremony consisted of little more than formal speeches, the parade of nations, raising of the Olympic flag, and lighting of the cauldron. Only a brief, choreographed display of dancers and flag wavers, after the parade of nations, was added to the formalities.

Beginning in 1980, the artistic and performative aspects of the ceremonies began to increase, with each host often seeking to out-do its predecessors. It was in this context that the opening ceremony of the Seoul games took place.

== Ceremony ==
=== Opening ===
As an innovation over prior opening ceremonies, the first act took the form of a parade of both traditional and modern watercraft on the Han River, accompanied by an elaborate kite display and a choir of Korean singers. The program then transitioned into the stadium for a choreographed display of banners and musicians, including a giant Korean drum. A balloon release was followed by further choreography, in which participants eventually formed the logo of the 1988 games, bringing an end to the initial artistic demonstration.

=== Parade of Nations ===
The flag bearers of 160 National Olympic Committees entered the stadium, ordered by the Korean alphabet, and followed by the athletes. The athletes were preceded by several hundred women bearing both Olympic flag and Seoul 1988 flags.

It was the last parade that involved East Germany, the Soviet Union, North Yemen, and Yugoslavia, and the only parade of South Yemen, which ceased to exist a few years later.

American athletes were noted to have exhibited "disorderly behavior" in front of the cameras by breaking ranks and forcing other delegations aside. U.S. Olympic Committee President Robert Helmick stated just after the ceremony that "we haven't received any complaints", adding that any lack of decorum was simply caused by "youthful American enthusiasm which shows the spirit of the Games". On 23 September the IOC delivered Helmick their complaint in a letter sent to the U.S. Olympic Committee, where the IOC stated its regret at the American team members' behavior.

=== Botched Dove Release ===
Despite being largely a great success, the ceremony also became notable as the last one at which doves were released. Since 1920, doves had been released at Olympic opening ceremonies. For the 1988 Olympics, birds were trained for a year in preparation for the event. The birds were supposed to fly around the stadium in circles until they reached the rim of the stadium and flew off in five directions. However, the birds flew erratically and landed all over the stadium, including on the cauldron where the Olympic flame was to be lit. When Olympic Torch bearers Kim Won-tak, Chong Son-man, and Son Mi-jong approached and lit the flame, some of the doves did not leave and were burnt alive. The outcry in response led to the replacement of the live birds with inanimate objects or human actors.

This was the first opening ceremony in which the new International Olympic Committee protocol rules were used. As such, all announcements made over the stadium's loudspeakers are made in the official language of the host country, in English and in French as the official languages of the IOC.

== Opening ==
SLOOC President Park Seh-jik delivered a speech in Korean, welcoming everyone. IOC President Juan Antonio Samaranch delivered a speech in English, French, and Korean. President of the Republic of Korea Roh Tae-woo declared the Games of the XXIV Olympiad in Seoul opened in Korean.

나는 제24회 근대올림픽대회를 경축하면서 서울올림픽 대회를 개최하는 것을 선언합니다. – In celebration of the XXIV Modern Olympic Games, I declare that the Seoul Olympic Games will be held.

— Roh Tae-woo, President of the Republic of Korea

== Anthems ==
- (International Olympic Committee) Olympic Hymn
- National Anthem of South Korea

== Dignitaries in attendance ==
Most countries were represented by governmental-level representatives, and only a few world leaders came to the ceremony.

=== Dignitaries from International organizations ===
- United Nations –
  - Secretary-General Javier Pérez de Cuéllar
- International Olympic Committee –
  - President of the International Olympic Committee Juan Antonio Samaranch and wife María Teresa Salisachs Rowe
  - IOC Honorary President for Life Lord Killanin and Members of the IOC

=== Host country dignitaries ===
- South Korea –
  - President of the Seoul Olympic Organizing Committee Park Seh-jik
  - President of the Republic of Korea Roh Tae-woo
  - First Lady of the Republic of Korea Kim Ok-suk
  - former Presidents of the Republic of Korea Yun Posun and Choi Kyu-hah
  - Former First Lady of the Republic of Korea Franziska Donner
  - Prime Minister Lee Hyun-jae
  - National Assembly member Kim Dae-jung and wife Lee Hee-ho
  - President of Democratic Reunification Kim Young-sam and wife Son Myung-soon
  - President of New Democratic Republican Party Kim Jong-pil
  - and other prominent South Korean politicians
  - Mayor of Seoul Kim Yong-rae

=== Dignitaries from Abroad ===
- Thailand –
  - Vice Prime Minister Tienchai Sirisamphan
- Japan –
  - Prime Minister Noboru Takeshita and wife Noko Takeshita
- China –
  - Second Vice Premier Tian Jiyun
- Spain –
  - Crown Prince Felipe and Queen Sofía of Spain (representing the King of Spain)
- West Germany –
  - First Mayor of Hamburg Henning Voscherau
- Denmark –
  - Crown Prince Frederick (representing the Queen of Denmark)
- France –
  - Foreign Minister Roland Dumas
- Italy –
  - Deputy Prime Minister Gianni De Michelis
- Greece –
  - Former King of Greece Constantine II
- Luxembourg –
  - Grand Duke Jean
- Monaco –
  - Prince of Monaco Rainier III
- United States –
  - Mayor of Los Angeles Tom Bradley
- Canada –
  - Mayor of Calgary Don Hartman
- Iran –
  - Vice President Ahmad Dargahi
- (The Gambia) Gambia –
  - Vice President Bakary Darbo and Foreign Minister Sey.O
- United Kingdom –
  - Minister for Sport Colin Moynihan, 4th Baron Moynihan
- Norway –
  - Crown Prince Harald and Prince Haakon of Norway (representing the King of Norway)
- Sweden –
  - King Carl XVI Gustaf
- Switzerland –
  - Vice President Jean-Pascal Delamuraz
- Malaysia –
  - King Azlan Shah of Perak
- Brunei –
  - Prince Sufri Bolkiah
