= Joseph Chan =

Joseph Chan may refer to:

- Joseph Chan Ho-lim (born 1977), Hong Kong politician
- Joseph Chan Yuek-sut (born 1936), Hong Kong politician
- Joseph Chan (sailor) (born 1949), Singapore sailor

== See also ==
- Joey Chan (born 1988), Hong Kong squash player
