= Tapani Peltola =

Finnish tenpin bowler (1959–2026)

Personal information
- Born: Jaakko Tapani Peltola; 26 December 1959 Espoo, Uusimaa, Finland
- Died: 26 June 2026 (aged 66) Rome, Italy

Sport
- Country: Finland
- Sport: Tenpin bowling
Medal record
Men's tenpin bowling
Representing Finland
Olympic Games (unofficial)
Bronze medal – third place	1988 Seoul	Tournament
European Championships
Gold medal – first place	1988	Singles
Gold medal – first place	1992	Singles

Jaakko Tapani Peltola (26 December 1959 – 26 June 2026) was a Finnish tenpin bowler. He competed at the 1988 Summer Olympics, winning the bronze medal in the unofficial men's tournament event. He also competed at the 1988 and 1992 European Bowling Championships, winning two gold medals in the men's singles events.

Peltola died in Rome on 26 June 2026, at the age of 66.
