= Bowling at the 1988 Summer Olympics =

Bowling at the Games of the XXIV Olympiad
- Venue: Royal Bowling Center
- Dates: 18 September 1988
- Competitors: 24 from 21 nations

Bowling at the 1988 Summer Olympics was an exhibition sport for the first, and so far only time. In all, a total 24 tenpin bowling bowlers, 12 male and 12 female, from 21 nations competed in the exhibition, which was held on September 18 at the Seoul's Royal Bowling Center.

== Preparations ==
The IOC Executive Board adopted bowling as an exhibition sport in January 1986, and the SLOOC created a bowling competition operation section in its secretariat in November 1987. The Bowling Operation was activated in March 1988. The organization hierarchy of the operation included the commissioner, secretary general, one director, two managers and nine officers. The operation headquarters moved its offices to the Royal Bowling Center (the venue), on June 24. It completed its staff of 137 shortly thereafter, including staff members of the SLOOC, volunteers, 91 support personnel, 55 specialized personnel and one temporary employee. A general rehearsal was held on September 9. The Royal Bowling Center, with 24 lanes (Brunswick20A-2), is located about 20 kilometers from the Olympic Village. No training site was designated separately. According to the specifications set for by the International Bowling Federation, 91 unit of 24 items, including 50 sets of pins, were secured to stage the competitions, while some implements used for the Seoul Asian Games were also used.

== Competition ==
In the morning were the preliminaries. 12 competitors each for the men's and women's events competed in an 11-game full league. In the afternoon were the finals. The first three placers in the full league contested for the first place under a ladder method of competition. Three members of the IBF officiated the competitions as referees. No bowling professionals competed in the demonstration events. Carol Gianotti of Australia, a former multiple LPBA Champion, competed but did not win a medal. All 1000 event tickets for the event were sold (only within South Korea).

=== Men's event ===
Kwon Jongryul of the Republic of Korea, who placed second in the preliminary, edged Singapore's Loke Chinto to capture the gold, and the third place went to Tapani Peltola of Finland.

=== Women's event ===
Arianne Cerdena of the Philippines, who placed first in the preliminary, finished first again, followed by Asai Atsuko of Japan in second place, and Annikki Maattola of Finland in third place.

== Results ==
| Event | 1st place | 2nd place | 3rd place |
|---|---|---|---|
| Men's tournament | Kwon Jong Yul; South Korea | Jack Wong Loke Chin; Singapore | Tapani Peltola; Finland |
| Women's tournament | Arianne Cerdeña; Philippines | Atsuko Asai; Japan | Annikki Maattola; Finland |

== Medal table ==
| Rank | Nation | Gold | Silver | Bronze | Total |
|---|---|---|---|---|---|
| 1 | Philippines | 1 | 0 | 0 | 1 |
| 1 | South Korea | 1 | 0 | 0 | 1 |
| 3 | Japan | 0 | 1 | 0 | 1 |
| 3 | Singapore | 0 | 1 | 0 | 1 |
| 5 | Finland | 0 | 0 | 2 | 2 |
| Totals (5 entries) | | 2 | 2 | 2 | 6 |

== Aftermath ==
The bowling industry lobbied unsuccessfully to get bowling recognized as a sport for future Games. It is not easy for young people in third-world countries to develop skill in bowling.

=== Multi-national competition outside of the Olympics ===
At the 1983 Pan American Games tenpins were a demonstration sport, with the tournament held in a similar manner to how it was held five years later, for similar demonstration purposes, at the 1988 Seoul Games. As a direct result of the 1983 experience in Caracas, Venezuela, for the first time anywhere, on August 2, 1991, in Havana, Cuba, the tenpin sport earned full "medal status" in an international multisport competition: the eleventh competition of the Pan American Games, at which all the nations of the Americas compete every four years. The medal-level competition has been held at every Pan American Games since then.

== See also ==
- Bowling at the Summer Olympics
