= 2018 Winter Paralympics =

Multi-parasport event in Pyeongchang, South Korea

XII Paralympic Winter Games
- Location: Pyeongchang, South Korea
- Motto: Passion. Connected. (Korean: 하나된 열정.)
- Nations: 49
- Athletes: 569
- Events: 80 in 6 sports
- Opening: 9 March 2018
- Closing: 18 March 2018
- Opened by: Moon Jae-in; President of South Korea
- Closed by: Andrew Parsons; President of the International Paralympic Committee
- Cauldron: Kim Eun-jung; Seo Soon-seok
- Stadium: Pyeongchang Olympic Stadium

The 2018 Winter Paralympics (Korean: 2018년 동계 패럴림픽; RR: 2018nyeon Donggye Paereollimpik), the 12th Paralympic Winter Games, and also more generally known as the PyeongChang 2018 Paralympic Winter Games, were an international multi-sport event for athletes with disabilities governed by the International Paralympic Committee (IPC), that was held in Pyeongchang, South Korea, from 9 to 18 March 2018. They were the second Paralympics to be held in South Korea, following the 1988 Summer Paralympics in Seoul.

569 athletes representing a record 49 National Paralympic Committees participated in these Games, including 3 newcomers Georgia, North Korea and Tajikistan. Following its debut as disciplines under the Alpine programme in Sochi, snowboarding was expanded into a separate sport with 8 additional events.

== Host selection ==
As part of a formal agreement between the International Paralympic Committee and the International Olympic Committee first established in 2001, the winner of the bid for the 2018 Winter Olympics was also to host the 2018 Winter Paralympics.

Pyeongchang was elected as host during the 123rd IOC Session in Durban in 2011, earning the required majority of at least 48 votes in the first round of voting.

2018 Winter Olympics bidding results
City	Nation	Votes
Pyeongchang	South Korea	63
Munich	Germany	25
Annecy	France	7

== Opening ceremony ==
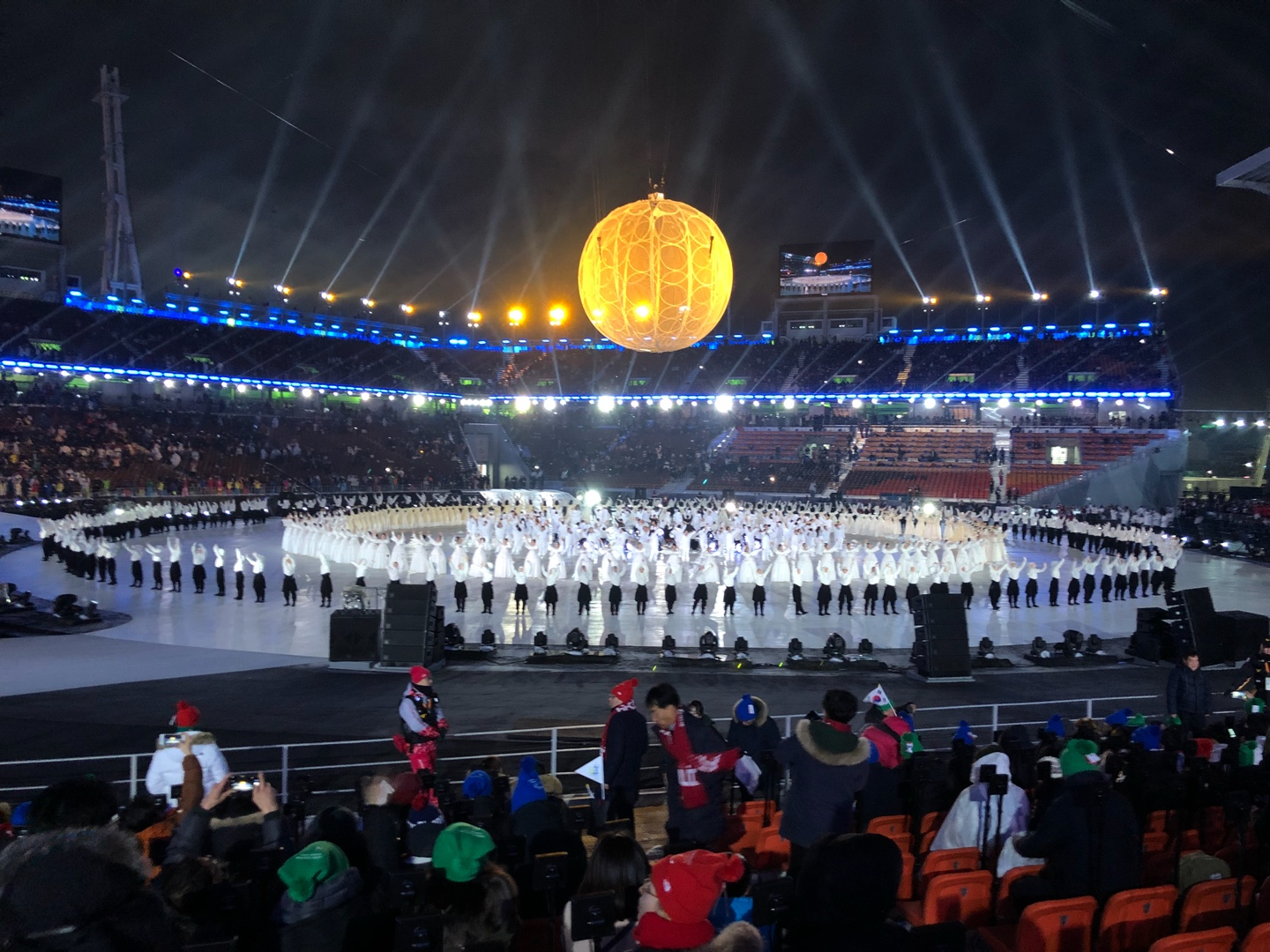
Opening ceremony at Pyeongchang Olympic Stadium

The opening ceremony was held on 9 March 2018 at Pyeongchang Olympic Stadium, which was built specifically for the Winter Games.

== Sports ==
Competitions in the 2018 Winter Paralympics are being held in six Winter Paralympic sports, with 80 medal events in total. Snowboard has been expanded into a separate discipline for 2018, with 10 medal events (in 2014, two medal events in snowboarding were held within the alpine skiing programme).

- Alpine skiing (30) ()
- Biathlon (18) ()
- Cross-country skiing (20) ()
- Ice hockey (1) ()
- Snowboarding (10) ()
- Wheelchair curling (1) ()

== Calendar ==
In the following calendar for the 2018 Winter Paralympics, each blue box represents an event competition. The yellow boxes represent days during which medal-awarding finals for a sport are held. The number in each yellow box represents the number of finals that are contested on that day.

●	Opening ceremony	Event competitions	Event finals	●	Closing ceremony

March	Fri 9th	Sat 10th	Sun 11th	Mon 12th	Tue 13th	Wed 14th	Thu 15th	Fri 16th	Sat 17th	Sun 18th	Gold Medals
Ceremonies	OC									CC	—N/a
Alpine skiing		6	6		6	6			3	3	30
Biathlon		6			6			6			18
Cross-country skiing			2	4		6			6	2	20
Ice hockey		●	●	●	●	●	●	●	●	1	1
Snowboard				5				5			10
Wheelchair curling		●	●	●	●	●	●	●	1		1
Total	0	12	8	9	12	12	0	11	10	6	80

== Participating National Paralympic Committees ==
Participating National Paralympic Committees
- Andorra (1)
- Argentina (2)
- Armenia (1)
- Australia (12)
- Austria (13)
- Belarus (14)
- Belgium (2)
- Bosnia and Herzegovina (1)
- Brazil (3)
- Bulgaria (1)
- Canada (52)
- Chile (4)
- China (26)
- Croatia (7)
- Czech Republic (21)
- Denmark (1)
- Finland (13)
- France (12)
- Georgia (2)
- Germany (20)
- Great Britain (14)
- Greece (1)
- Hungary (2)
- Iceland (1)
- Iran (5)
- Italy (26)
- Japan (38)
- Kazakhstan (6)
- North Korea (2)
- South Korea (99) (host)
- Mexico (1)
- Mongolia (1)
- Netherlands (9)
- Neutral Paralympic Athletes (30)
- New Zealand (3)
- Norway (32)
- Poland (9)
- Romania (1)
- Serbia (1)
- Slovakia (11)
- Slovenia (1)
- Spain (3)
- Sweden (24)
- Switzerland (13)
- Tajikistan (1)
- Turkey (1)
- Ukraine (20)
- United States (68)
- Uzbekistan (1)

- Russia had been suspended by the International Paralympic Committee due to the discovery of a state-sponsored doping program active during the 2014 Winter Olympics and Paralympics. The IPC allowed Russian athletes to qualify as neutral participants. They fielded 30 athletes in 5 sports, participating as Neutral Paralympic Athletes (NPA), marching under the Paralympic flag at the opening and closing ceremonies and the Paralympic anthem played in any ceremony.
- Four more nations competed in Pyeongchang than at the previous winter games. Georgia, North Korea and Tajikistan all made their Winter Paralympics debut, while Hungary fielded a team after not competing in 2014. Tajikistan is the only country who had sent an athlete to these Games but not the 2018 Winter Olympics.
- In total, 133 female athletes competed at the event.

== Venues ==
=== Pyeongchang Mountain cluster ===
==== Alpensia ====
Alpensia Resort in Daegwallyeong-myeon will be the focus of the 2018 Pyeongchang Winter Paralympics.

- Alpensia Resort – biathlon, cross-country skiing
- Main Olympic Village – athletes village
- Pyeongchang Olympic Stadium – awards and opening and closing ceremonies

==== Standalone venue ====
- Jeongseon Alpine Centre – alpine skiing and snowboarding

=== Gangneung coastal cluster ===
- Gangneung Curling Centre – wheelchair curling
- Gangneung Hockey Centre – ice hockey

== Medals ==
* Host nation (South Korea)

Rank	Nation	Gold	Silver	Bronze	Total
1	United States	13	15	8	36
2	Neutral Paralympic Athletes	8	10	6	24
3	Canada	8	4	16	28
4	France	7	8	5	20
5	Germany	7	8	4	19
6	Ukraine	7	7	8	22
7	Slovakia	6	4	1	11
8	Belarus	4	4	4	12
9	Japan	3	4	3	10
10	Netherlands	3	3	1	7
11	Switzerland	3	0	0	3
12	Italy	2	2	1	5
13	Great Britain	1	4	2	7
14	Norway	1	3	4	8
15	Australia	1	0	3	4
16	Finland	1	0	2	3
16	New Zealand	1	0	2	3
16	South Korea*	1	0	2	3
19	Croatia	1	0	1	2
20	China	1	0	0	1
20	Kazakhstan	1	0	0	1
22	Austria	0	2	5	7
23	Spain	0	1	1	2
24	Sweden	0	1	0	1
25	Belgium	0	0	1	1
25	Poland	0	0	1	1
Totals (26 entries)		80	80	81	241

== Broadcasting ==
Television rights were sold in various countries and territories; the IPC partnered with the IOC's streaming service Olympic Channel for online streaming coverage of these Paralympics.

In 2017, the European Broadcasting Union renewed its rights to the Paralympics in 25 European countries through 2020

In the United States, NBC Sports announced plans to air nearly twice as much coverage on linear television as it did in Sochi, totaling 250 hours, along with extensive online streaming coverage.

In Canada, the CBC announced that it would broadcast over 600 hours of coverage in English and French across its platforms, including CBC Television, Ici Radio-Canada Télé, and sublicence partners Sportsnet One and AMI-tv.

Channel 4 returned as the Games' rightsholder in the United Kingdom, planning over 100 hours of television coverage on Channel 4 and 4seven.

== Tickets ==
Ticket prices for the 2018 Winter Paralympics were announced on 8 June 2017 and tickets went on sale on 21 August 2017.

Prices for sporting event tickets range from ₩10,000 to 50,000 (approx. $8–45 USD). Opening and closing ceremony tickets range from ₩10,000 to ₩140,000 (approx. $8–125 USD).

As of 19 January, tickets to the Paralympic Games were 70% sold. (155,000 tickets out of a total of 223,353 allocated).

== Marketing ==
=== Emblem ===
The emblem for the 2018 Winter Paralympics was unveiled on 29 October 2013 at the National Museum of Korea. It incorporates stylized renditions of the hangul letter ㅊ ch (as also used in the Olympic emblem), which symbolizes part of the name Pyeongchang and resembles ice crystals. The Paralympic emblem features two of these letters joined together, symbolizing equality and a "grand" festival welcoming international athletes and spectators.

=== Mascot ===
The official mascots of the 2018 Winter Olympics and Paralympics were unveiled on 2 June 2016. The Paralympic mascot, Bandabi, is an Asian black bear that symbolizes "strong will and courage".

=== Cultural events ===
To attract interest from residents and foreign tourists, the Korea Tourism Organization organized Snow Festival, a "Hallyu festival", to serve as cultural programming for the Paralympics. Actors Jang Keun-suk and Lee Dong-wook purchased 2,018 and 1,000 tickets for themselves and fans to attend meetups at para ice hockey games, while a K-pop concert featuring B1A4 and BtoB was also organized.

== Concerns and controversies ==
=== North Korean relations ===
Prior to the 2018 Winter Olympics, North Korea agreed to have its athletes march together with those of the South Korean team during the opening ceremonies, and field a unified women's hockey team. However, during a meeting in Pyeongchang between the leaders of their National Paralympic Committees, the two countries were unable to organize a similar arrangement for the Paralympics. The South Korean Paralympic Committee stated that North Korean officials had requested that the Liancourt Rocks (which are the subject of an ongoing sovereignty dispute between South Korea and Japan) be included on the Korean Unification Flag during the Paralympics. South Korea declined this request, as they considered it contradictory to IPC recommendations against political gestures.

IPC president Andrew Parsons expressed disappointment over the decision, but noted that the country "respects and values the IPC's vision and mission" and had "committed to working further with the IPC to improve the lives of people with an impairment in North Korea", while also acknowledging that the IOC had "made great progress in opening up dialogue between the two nations" prior to the Olympics, and that their meeting "underlines the tremendous ability of sport to bring countries together in positive dialogue."

== See also ==
- 2018 Winter Olympics
- Winter Olympics

== Notes ==
Preceded by Sochi	Winter Paralympics; Pyeongchang; XII Paralympic Winter Games (2018)	Succeeded by Beijing
