= Fernando Mariaca =

Spanish weightlifter

Personal information
- Nationality: Spanish
- Born: 30 May 1959 (age 66) Álava, Spain

Sport
- Sport: Weightlifting

Fernando Mariaca (born 30 May 1959) is a Spanish weightlifter. He competed at the 1984 Summer Olympics, the 1988 Summer Olympics and the 1992 Summer Olympics.
