= Pyeongchang Olympic Stadium =

Temporary 2018 venue in South Korea

- 평창 올림픽 스타디움
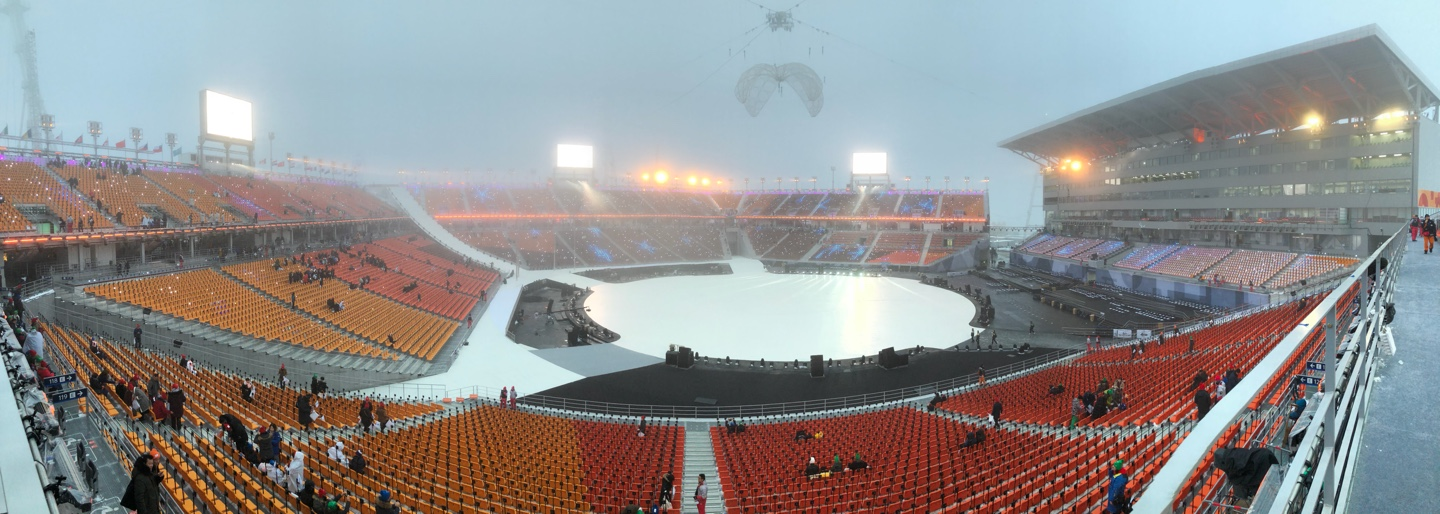
- The stadium before the 2018 Winter Paralympics opening ceremony

- Location in South Korea
- Location: Pyeongchang, South Korea
- Coordinates: 37.667°N 128.706°E
- Capacity: 35,000
- Surface: Snow, Ice, Grass
- Field size: Diameter: 72 m (236 ft)
- Field shape: Circular
- Acreage: 14.53 acres

Construction
- Built: 2015–2017
- Opened: 30 October 2017; 8 years ago
- Closed: 21 March 2018; 8 years ago
- Demolished: 20 September 2018; 7 years ago
- Cost: ₩116 billion ($109 million)

The Pyeongchang Olympic Stadium (Korean: 평창 올림픽 스타디움) was a temporary venue for the opening and closing ceremonies of the 2018 Winter Olympics and Paralympics in Pyeongchang County, Gangwon Province, South Korea. The stadium was demolished after the Games.

== Background ==
It was located in Daegwallyeong-myeon, in the precinct of the Pyeongchang Olympic Plaza, about 2 km (1.2 mi) northeast of Alpensia Resort.

To limit its costs, the stadium had no roof or a central heating system. It cost ₩116 billion ($109 million). The 35,000-seat stadium had seven floors above ground, a single floor underground, and a pentagonal design. It had a floor area of 58,790 square meters (632,800 sq ft) and its circular stage had a diameter of 72-meter (236 ft)

Built on an 80,000 square meters (860,000 sq ft) site in Hoenggye, it was the final major structure built for these Games. The approximate elevation was 740 meters (2,430 ft) above sea level.

Adjacent to the stadium was an Olympic exhibition hall, traditional food markets, and other attractions, which would remain as heritage facilities and the medal plaza which hosted medal ceremonies.

== History ==
In the bid book of PyeongChang 2018, the opening and closing ceremonies were planned to take place in Alpensia Ski Jumping Stadium. As they did not plan to build an Olympic Stadium and so a plan similar to the one developed by Lillehammer for the 1994 Winter Olympics was presented. However, in July 2012, the POCOG announced some changes to the project and the venues plan and the ceremonies were moved to Hoenggye. The main reasons were organisational, with possible interference between the preparation of the ceremonies and the ski jumping training, and the extreme weather conditions for the spectators.

The construction of the stadium which took one year and ten months was completed on 30 September 2017.

The stadium only hosted five events before it was demolished, beginning with the Dream Concert—a special K-pop concert on 4 November 2017 to mark 100 days remaining before the opening ceremonies. The other four events were the opening and closing ceremonies of the 2018 Winter Olympics, and the opening and closing ceremonies of the 2018 Winter Paralympics.

== See also ==
- Théâtre des Cérémonies, a similar temporary facility for the 1992 Winter Olympics.

Preceded by Fisht Olympic Stadium; Sochi	Winter Olympics; Opening and closing ceremonies venue (Olympic Stadium); 2018	Succeeded by Beijing National Stadium; Beijing
