= Curfews in South Korea =

Nighttime travel restrictions in South Korea

South Korea enforced a nighttime curfew beginning under the US military administration of the South in September 1945 and lasting until January 5, 1982.

== History ==
=== Post-liberation ===
On September 8, 1945, John Hodge, commander of the 24th Corps in Korea, proclaimed a nighttime curfew in Incheon and Seoul. The curfew restricted movement between 8 pm and 5 am and was issued under Douglas MacArthur's military government in Korea. The curfew modeled an existing curfew order issued by Ikuta Kiyosaburo, the last Japanese colonial administrator of the Gyeonggi Province. Exceptions to the military curfew were made for security forces, doctors and those traveling on official business. On July 8, 1950, following the outbreak of the Korean War in June, the curfew was expanded nationally.

Following the end of the Korean War in July 1953, the military curfew was codified into the April 1954 Punishment of Minor Offenses Act (Korean: 경범죄처벌법). The Minor Offenses Act gave the gave the Minister of Home Affairs the authority to set and enforce the curfew. Throughout the 1950s, curfew hours were set flexibly and were adjusted by one or two hours. From November 1, 1958, the curfew was set in stone to be between midnight and 4 am.

=== Under Park Chung Hee ===
Mass protests against Syngman Rhee's government and the fraudulent March 1960 presidential election renewed calls to abolish the curfew system. In May 1961, Park Chung Hee staged a military coup, ending the short-term possibility of the abolition of the curfew system. During the enactment of martial law following the coup, the curfew's hours were extended to be from 10 pm to 4 am.

In January 1964, Kim Jong-pil, the leader of Park Chung Hee's Democratic Republican Party, announced the government's intention to lift the curfew nationwide. Curfews were lifted in Jeju Province on January 18, 1964, on a trial basis and in Ulleung County on February 20. With no issues resulting from the lifting of curfews in the two island regions, the curfew was then lifted in the landlocked North Chungcheong Province, again as a pilot program.

=== Under Chun Doo-hwan and abolition ===
Chun Doo-hwan's government lifted the curfew system for most of the country on January 5, 1982; for coastal and border regions, the curfew was lifted on March 28, 1982. Many Korean historians view Chun's decision to lift the curfew to be motivated by an interest in appeasing the country's middle class.

== Rationale ==
Curfews were first justified as being necessary for the maintenance of public order. To justify the curfews, the Minister of Home Affairs cited a lack of police resources and the need to detect spies and criminals and police nightlife. By late 1954, one year after the armistice, complaints about the curfew system were common; opposition to the curfews grew throughout the 1950s. In response to public opposition, official justifications for refusing to lift the curfews shifted away from safety concerns towards its necessity to combat immoral or deviant behaviors.

== Enforcement ==
Under the Park Chung Hee military dictatorship, some curfew violators were interned at the Korea Youth Pioneer Corps concentration camp.

== Effects ==
The hours before the curfew were chaotic and congested. Traffic accidents peaked in the two hours before the curfew as drivers were incentivised to speed to obey the law. It was common for taxi drivers to overcharge or rob passengers before the curfew. Soldiers and police officers tasked with enforcing the curfew were often the subject of hit and runs.

After the curfew was lifted in 1982, traffic accidents between 10 pm and 12 am fell sharply.
