= Park Seh-jik =

South Korean politician (1933–2009)

Park Seh-jik Olympic Order
- 박세직
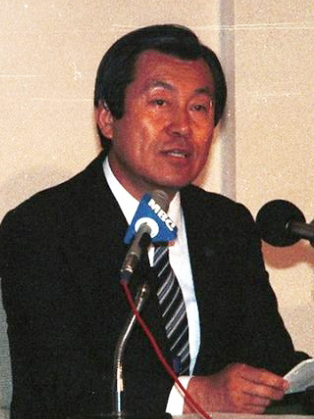

Mayor of Seoul
- In office 27 December 1990 – 18 February 1991
- Preceded by: Goh Kun
- Succeeded by: Rhee Hai-won

President of the Seoul Olympic Organizing Committee
- In office 7 May 1986 – 2 October 1988
- IOC President: Juan Antonio Samaranch
- Preceded by: Roh Tae-woo
- Succeeded by: Pasqual Maragall

Chair of the Seoul Olympic Organizing Committee
- In office 7 May 1986 – 3 April 1989
- Preceded by: Roh Tae-woo
- Succeeded by: Position dissolved

Personal details
- Born: 18 September 1933 Chilgok, Keishōhoku Province, Korea, Empire of Japan
- Died: 27 July 2009 (aged 75) Seoul, South Korea
- Party: Democratic Liberal Party
- Spouse: Hong Suk-ja
- Children: 2 sons and 1 daughter
- Religion: Protestantism

Military service
- Branch/service: Republic of Korea Army

Korean name
- Hangul: 박세직
- Hanja: 朴世直
- RR: Bak Sejik
- MR: Pak Sejik

Art name
- Hangul: 인동
- Hanja: 仁東
- RR: Indong
- MR: Indong

Park Seh-jik (Korean: 박세직; 18 September 1933 – 27 July 2009) was a South Korean politician, bureaucrat and army general. He held many powerful positions throughout his lifetime, such as the Mayor of Seoul and the Director of Agency for National Security Planning (ANSP), a preceding agency of the National Intelligence Service (NIS). He was President of the Seoul Organizing Committee for the 1986 Asian Games and 1988 Summer Olympics in Seoul.

He died of acute pneumonia on 27 July 2009.

== Early life ==
Park Seh-jik was born on 18 September 1933, in Chilgok, Keishōhoku Province, Korea, Empire of Japan.

=== Education ===
Park graduated from the Busan National University of Education. When the Korean War broke out, he enlisted as a soldier and eventually entered the Korea Military Academy, graduating in 1956 with the 12th class. While serving in the military, he received his master's degree from the Graduate School of English Language and Literature at Seoul National University.

Park eventually went on to receive a doctorate in education from the University of Southern California.

=== Non-degree completion ===
Seoul National University Graduate School of Public Administration 8 Graduated from Seoul National University Graduate School of Business 11

=== Honorary doctorate ===
US Columbia University Honors Philosophy Dr. Doctor of Honor Humanities Science, Tarson University, Maryland State, US Honorary Doctorate in Humanities at Christ Baptist University in Dallas, Texas, US Honorary Doctorate of Humanities at Aiken University, US Doctor of Honorary Education, Daegu University Daejeon University honorary Military Science doctorate degree

== Career ==
=== Seoul Olympics ===
On 7 May 1986, Park was appointed and nominated as President of the Seoul Olympic Organizing Committee to replace Roh Tae-woo before stepping down.

=== Mayor ===
Park was appointed as Mayor of Seoul on 27 December 1990, succeeding Goh Kun. He held the office for 54 days before being succeeded by Lee Haewon on 18 February 1991.

== Personal life ==
Park was married to Hong Suk-ja. He had three children.

=== Death ===
Park died on 27 July 2009, at the age of 75 due to acute pneumonia. He was survived by his wife, Hong Suk-ja, his two sons, and daughter.

Sporting positions
Preceded by (South Korea) Roh Tae-woo	President of Organizing Committee for Summer Olympic Games; 1988	Succeeded by (Spain) Pasqual Maragall
Political offices
Preceded by Goh Kun	Mayor of Seoul; 1990–1991	Succeeded by Lee Haewon
Preceded by Bae Myung-in	Director of the Agency for National Security Planning (ANSP); 1988–1989	Succeeded by Seo Dong-kown
