= 2018 Winter Paralympics closing ceremony =

- Part of 2018 Winter Paralympics
- Date: 18 March 2018
- Time: 20:00–21:35 KST (UTC+9)
- Venue: Pyeongchang Olympic Stadium
- Location: Pyeongchang, South Korea
- Filmed by: Olympic Broadcasting Services (OBS)
- Footage: The ceremony on the IPC YouTube channel on YouTube

The 2018 Winter Paralympics closing ceremony was held at Pyeongchang Olympic Stadium in Pyeongchang, South Korea, on March 18, 2018.

== Ceremony ==
- Bandabi, the official mascot of the Games, opens the ceremony.
- South Korean band Kim Chang-wan Band performed "Arirang".
- The IPC President Andrew Parsons paid tribute to the late Stephen Hawking in his closing speech.
- The flag bearers from each participating country entered the stadium informally in single file, ordered by ganada order of the Korean alphabet, and behind them marched all the athletes, without any distinction or grouping by nationality.
- The flag was passed by the mayor of Pyeongchang, Shim Jae-kook, to IPC President, Andrew Parsons, who then handed over to the mayor of Beijing, Chen Jining.
- Beijing 2022 handover ceremony and flame extinguishing occurred at the end.

=== Performances ===
- Countertenor singer Lee Hee-sang and pianist Kim Ye-ji performed "You are a Flower".
- Bae Hui Gwan Band performed "존재감".
- South Korean singer Ailee performed her megahit "I Will Show You".
  - Bae Hui Gwan Band and Ailee also performed together the song "그대에게" by the late Shin Hae-chul.

== Anthems ==
- Sunny Kim - South Korean National Anthem
- Seoul Philharmonic Orchestra - Paralympic Hymn
- A choir of children's singers from the 56 ethnic groups of China - People's Republic of China National Anthem
