= Seoul Olympic Organizing Committee =

The Seoul Olympic Organizing Committee for the Games of the XXIV Olympiad, or SLOOC, also known as the Seoul Olympic Organizing Committee, was an informal name for the Seoul Olympic Organizing Committee for the Games of the XXIV Olympiad. The President of SLOOC was Park Seh-jik.

== Board members ==
The board members are:

- Park Seh-jik - President
- Kim Un-yong - Vice President
