= Joseph Chan (sailor) =

Singaporean sailor (born 1949)

Personal information
- Full name: Joseph Chan Khun Sing
- Nationality: Singaporean
- Born: 6 March 1949 (age 76)
- Height: 174 cm (5 ft 9 in)
- Weight: 68 kg (150 lb)

Sport
- Sport: Sailing

Joseph Chan Khun Sing (born 6 March 1949) is a Singaporean former sailor. He competed at the 1988 Summer Olympics and the 1992 Summer Olympics.
