= Taenung International Shooting Range =

Shooting range in Seoul, South Korea

Coordinates: 35.25087°N 128.68491°E

The Taenung International Shooting Range is a shooting range located in Seoul, South Korea. Constructed in 1972, it hosted the ISSF World Shooting Championships (then the UIT World Shooting Championships) in 1978, the first time an international sporting event of this magnitude took place in the country. It was renovated in 1987-8 before the Olympics to comply with International Shooting Sport Federation (ISSF, then UIT) standards. The venue hosted the shooting and the shooting portion of the modern pentathlon events for the 1988 Summer Olympics.
