= Royal Bowling Center =

Bowling alley in Seoul, South Korea

The Royal Bowling Center is a bowling alley located in Seoul, South Korea. It hosted the bowling demonstration events during the 1988 Summer Olympics.
