= 1988 Summer Olympics =

Multi-sport event in Seoul, South Korea

Games of the XXIV Olympiad
- Emblem of the 1988 Summer Olympics
- Location: Seoul, South Korea
- Motto: Harmony and Progress (화합과 전진)
- Nations: 160
- Athletes: 8,453 (6,250 men, 2,203 women)
- Events: 237 in 23 sports (31 disciplines)
- Opening: 17 September 1988
- Closing: 2 October 1988
- Opened by: President Roh Tae-woo
- Closed by: IOC president Juan Antonio Samaranch
- Cauldron: Sohn Kee-chung; Chung Sun-man; Kim Won-tak
- Stadium: Seoul Olympic Stadium

- 1988 Summer Olympics
- Hangul: 서울 하계 올림픽
- RR: Seoul hagye Ollimpik
- MR: Sŏul hagye Ollimp'ik
- IPA: [sʰʌ.uɭ haɡje oɭːimpʰik̚]

The 1988 Summer Olympics (Korean: 1988년 하계 올림픽), officially the Games of the XXIV Olympiad (제24회 올림픽경기대회) and officially branded as Seoul 1988 (서울 1988), were an international multi-sport event held from 17 September to 2 October 1988 in Seoul, South Korea. 159 nations were represented at the games by a total of 8,391 athletes (6,197 men and 2,194 women). 237 events were held and 27,221 volunteers helped to prepare the Olympics.

The 1988 Seoul Olympics were the second summer Olympic Games held in Asia, after the 1964 Summer Olympics in Tokyo, and the first held in South Korea. As the host country, South Korea ranked fourth overall, winning 12 gold medals and 33 medals in the competition. 11,331 media (4,978 written press and 6,353 broadcasters) showed the Games all over the world. These were the last Olympic Games of the Cold War, as well as for the Soviet Union and East Germany, as both ceased to exist before the next Olympic Games in 1992. The Soviet Union won the most gold and overall medals at the 1988 Games, with 55 and 132 respectively. East Germany was second, and the United States third.

Compared to the 1980 Summer Olympics (Moscow) and the 1984 Summer Olympics (Los Angeles), which were divided into two camps by ideology, the 1988 Seoul Olympics was a competition in which the boycotts virtually disappeared, although they were not completely over. A boycott of the 1988 Seoul Olympics took place, with North Korea along with its allies Cuba, Ethiopia, Nicaragua, and Madagascar taking part. Albania and the Seychelles did not respond to invitations sent by the IOC. Nonetheless, the much larger boycotts seen in the three previous editions were avoided, resulting in the largest number of participating nations during the Cold War era.

For South Korea, the 1988 Olympics was a symbolic milestone that elevated its international standing while fostering national pride. Only thirty five years after the devastation of the Korean War, and following decades of authoritarian rule and social unrest which concluded with the June Democratic Struggle just a year earlier, the games were staged successfully. The event was regarded as the peak of the "Miracle on the Han River". In 1999, 11 years after the games, the IOC returned to Seoul for the 109th IOC Session, which saw Turin elected as the host city for the 2006 Winter Olympics.

== Host city selection ==
Seoul was chosen to host the Summer Games through a vote held on 30 September 1981, finishing ahead of Nagoya, Japan. The awarding to Seoul was internationally considered to be surprising, with Nagoya having been considered a favourite. Below was the vote count that occurred at the 84th IOC Session and 11th Olympic Congress in Baden-Baden, West Germany.

1988 Summer Olympics bidding result
City	Country (NOC)	Round 1
Seoul	South Korea	52
Nagoya	Japan	27

Seoul had previously hosted many international events, but the most noteworthy ones were the Miss Universe 1980 and the 1986 Asian Games, thus demonstrating that it had the appropriate capability.

== Highlights ==
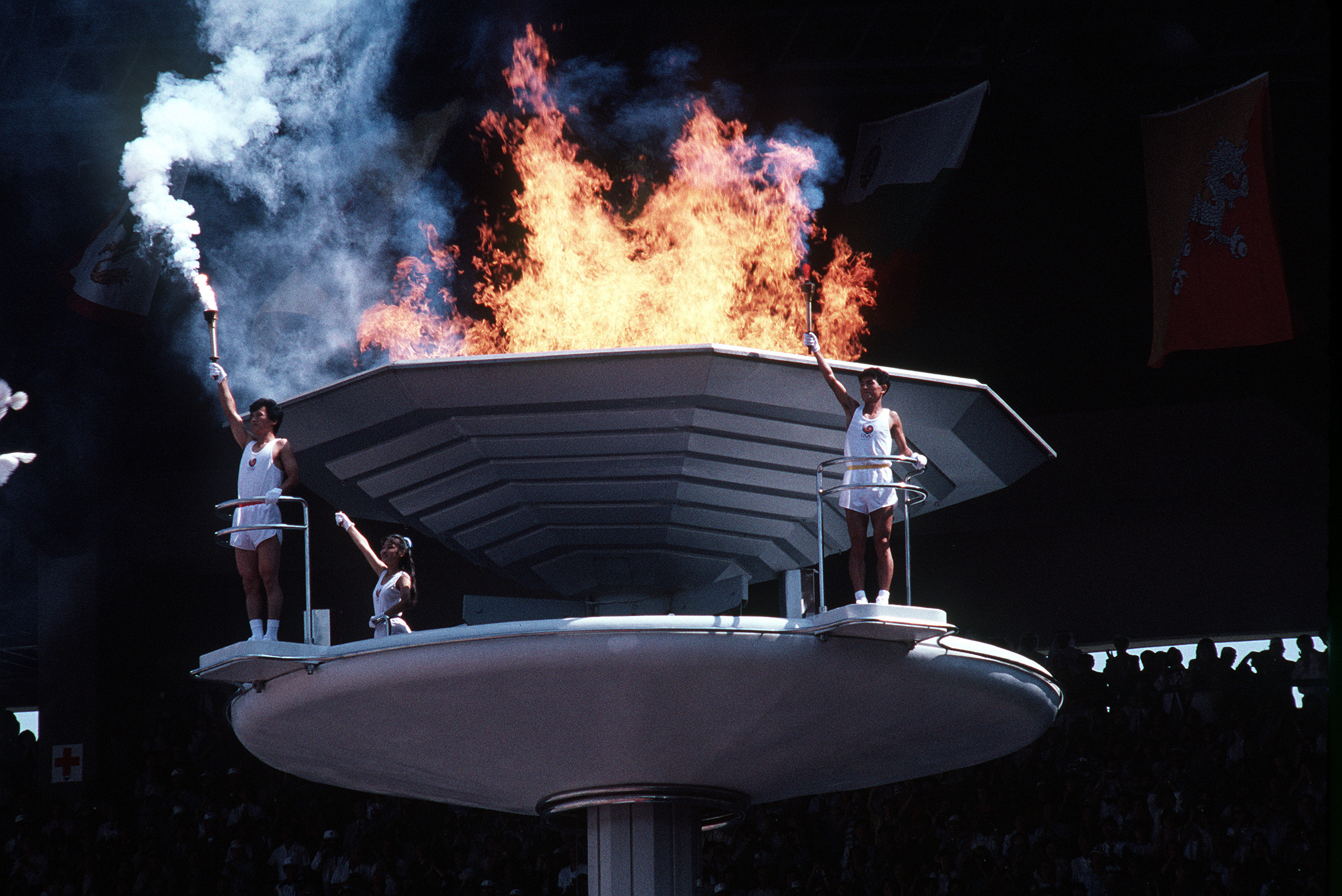
Kim Won-tak (athlete), Chong Son-man (teacher) and Son Mi-jong (dance student) during the lighting of the 1988 Summer Olympic cauldron

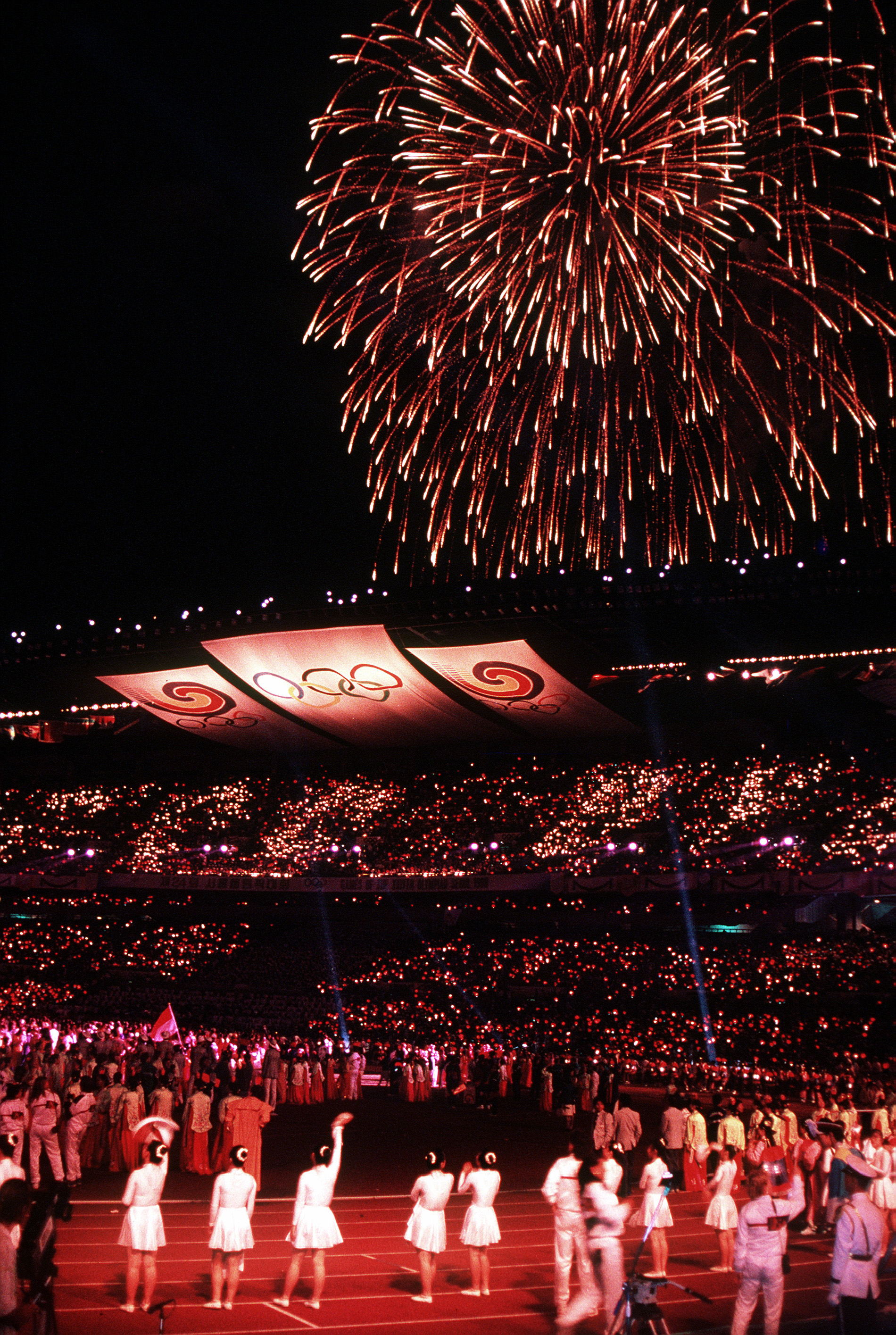
Fireworks at the closing ceremony of the 1988 Summer Olympics

- Vladimir Artemov of the Soviet Union won four gold medals in gymnastics. Daniela Silivaş of Romania won three and equalled compatriot Nadia Comăneci's record of seven perfect 10s in one Olympic Games.
- After having demolished the world record in the 100-metre dash at the US Olympic trials in Indianapolis, sprinter Florence Griffith Joyner set an Olympic record (10.62) in the 100-metre dash and a still-standing world record (21.34) in the 200-metre dash to capture gold medals in both events. To these medals, she added a gold in the 4×100 relay and a silver in the 4×400.
- This was the first Olympic Games where women's sailing was its own event. It was won by Americans Allison Jolly and Lynne Jewell.
- Canadian Ben Johnson won the 100-metre final with a world-record time of 9.79 seconds, but was disqualified after he tested positive for stanozolol. Johnson has since claimed that his positive test was the result of sabotage.
- In the women's artistic gymnastics team all-around competition, the United States women's team was penalized five-tenths of a point from their team score by the Fédération Internationale de Gymnastique (FIG) after the compulsory round. East German judge Ellen Berger noticed that Rhonda Faehn, who was the American team alternate and not competing, had been standing on the uneven bars podium for the duration of Kelly Garrison-Steve's compulsory uneven bars routine. Although Faehn was not a coach, Berger assessed the penalty under a rule prohibiting coaches from remaining on the podium while an athlete competes. The deduction caused the United States to fall to fourth place with a combined score of 390.575, three-tenths of a point behind East Germany. This incident remains controversial in the sport of gymnastics, as the United States outperformed the East German team and would have taken the bronze medal in the team competition had they not been penalized.
- The USSR won their final team gold medals in artistic gymnastics on both the men's and women's sides with scores of 593.350 and 395.475 respectively. The men's team was led by Vladimir Artemov, while Elena Shushunova led the women's team.
- Phoebe Mills won an individual bronze medal on the balance beam, shared with Romania's Gabriela Potorac, making history as the first medal (team or individual) ever won by a US woman in artistic gymnastics at a fully attended games.
- Lawrence Lemieux, a Canadian sailor in the Finn class, was in second place and poised to win a silver medal when he abandoned the race to save an injured competitor in mortal peril. He finished in 21st place, but was recognized by the International Fair Play Committee with the Pierre de Coubertin World Trophy honoring his bravery and sacrifice.
- American diver Greg Louganis won back-to-back titles on both diving events despite striking his head on the springboard during his third-round dive and suffering a concussion.
- Christa Luding-Rothenburger of East Germany won the silver medal in the women's sprint event in cycling. Combined with the two medals she won in speed skating in the Winter Games in Calgary, she became the first athlete to win medals in two Olympics held in the same year; this feat is no longer possible due to the current scheduling of the Olympic Games.
- Anthony Nesty of Suriname won his country's first Olympic medal by winning the men's 100-metre butterfly, prevailing over American Matt Biondi by .01 of a second (thwarting Biondi's attempt to match Mark Spitz's record seven golds in one Olympics). Nesty was the first black person to win an individual swimming gold.
- Swimmer Kristin Otto of East Germany won six gold medals. Other multi-gold medalists in the pool were Matt Biondi (five) and Janet Evans (three).
- Swedish fencer Kerstin Palm became the first woman to take part in seven Olympics.
- Mark Todd of New Zealand won his second consecutive individual gold medal in the three-day event in equestrian on Charisma, only the second time in eventing history that a gold medal has been won consecutively.
- Baseball and Taekwondo were demonstration sports. The opening ceremony featured a mass demonstration of taekwondo with hundreds of adults and children performing moves in unison.
- This was the last time the United States was represented by an all-amateur basketball team that did not feature NBA players; the team won the bronze medal after losing to the Soviet Union (that was represented by veteran professionals) which went on to win the gold medal.
- For the first time in history, all the dressage events were won by women.
- Women's judo was held for the first time, as a demonstration sport.
- Bowling was held as a demonstration sport, with Kwon Jong Yul of South Korea and Arianne Cerdeña from the Philippines winning the men's and women's gold medals, respectively.
- Table tennis was introduced at the Olympics, with China and South Korea both winning two titles.
- Tennis returned to the Olympics after a 64-year absence. Steffi Graf of West Germany added to her four Grand Slam victories in the year by also winning the Olympic title in women's singles, beating Gabriela Sabatini of Argentina in the final. Graf became the first person to win all four Grand Slams and the Olympic gold in a calendar year, known as the golden slam.
- Two Bulgarian weightlifters were stripped of their gold medals after failing doping tests, and the team withdrew in protest, missing the remaining events.
- In boxing, Roy Jones Jr. of the United States dominated his opponents, never losing a single round en route to the final. In the final, he controversially lost a 3–2 decision to South Korean fighter Park Si-Hun despite pummeling Park for three rounds and landing 86 punches to Park's 32.
- In another boxing controversy, Riddick Bowe of the United States lost a controversial match in the final to Canadian future world heavyweight champion Lennox Lewis. Bowe had a dominant first round, landing 33 of 94 punches thrown (34%) while Lewis landed 14 of 67 (21%). In the first round the referee from East Germany gave Bowe two cautions for headbutts and deducted a point for a third headbutt, although replay clearly showed there was none. Commentator Ferdie Pacheco disagreed with the deduction, saying they did not hit heads. In the second round, Lewis landed several hard punches. The referee gave Bowe two standing eight counts and waved the fight off after the second one, even though Bowe seemed able to continue. Pacheco disagreed with the stoppage, calling it "very strange".
- Soviet weightlifter Yury Zakharevich won the men's heavyweight (up to 110 kg class) with a 210 kg (460 lb) snatch and 245 kg (540 lb) clean and jerk for a 455 kg (1,003 lb) total. Zakhareivich had dislocated his elbow in 1983 attempting a world record and had it rebuilt with synthetic tendons.
- Indonesia gained its first medal in Olympic history when the women's team won a silver medal in archery.

== Ceremonies ==
Live doves were released during the opening ceremony as a symbol of world peace, but a number of the doves were burned alive or suffered major trauma by the lighting of the Olympic cauldron. As a result of protests following the incident, the last time live doves were released during the opening ceremony was in 1992 in Barcelona, at the start of the ceremony. Balloon doves were released in 1994 Winter Olympics and the 1998 Winter Olympics and paper doves were used at the Atlanta Ceremony in 1996.

These were also the last Summer Olympic Games to hold the opening ceremony during the daytime. The opening ceremony featured a skydiving team descending over the stadium and forming the five-colored Olympic Rings, as well as a mass demonstration of taekwondo. The skydiving team trained at SkyDance SkyDiving and had hoped the opening ceremony appearance would set the stage for skydiving becoming a medal event by 2000 (what never happened).

== Domestic historical significance ==
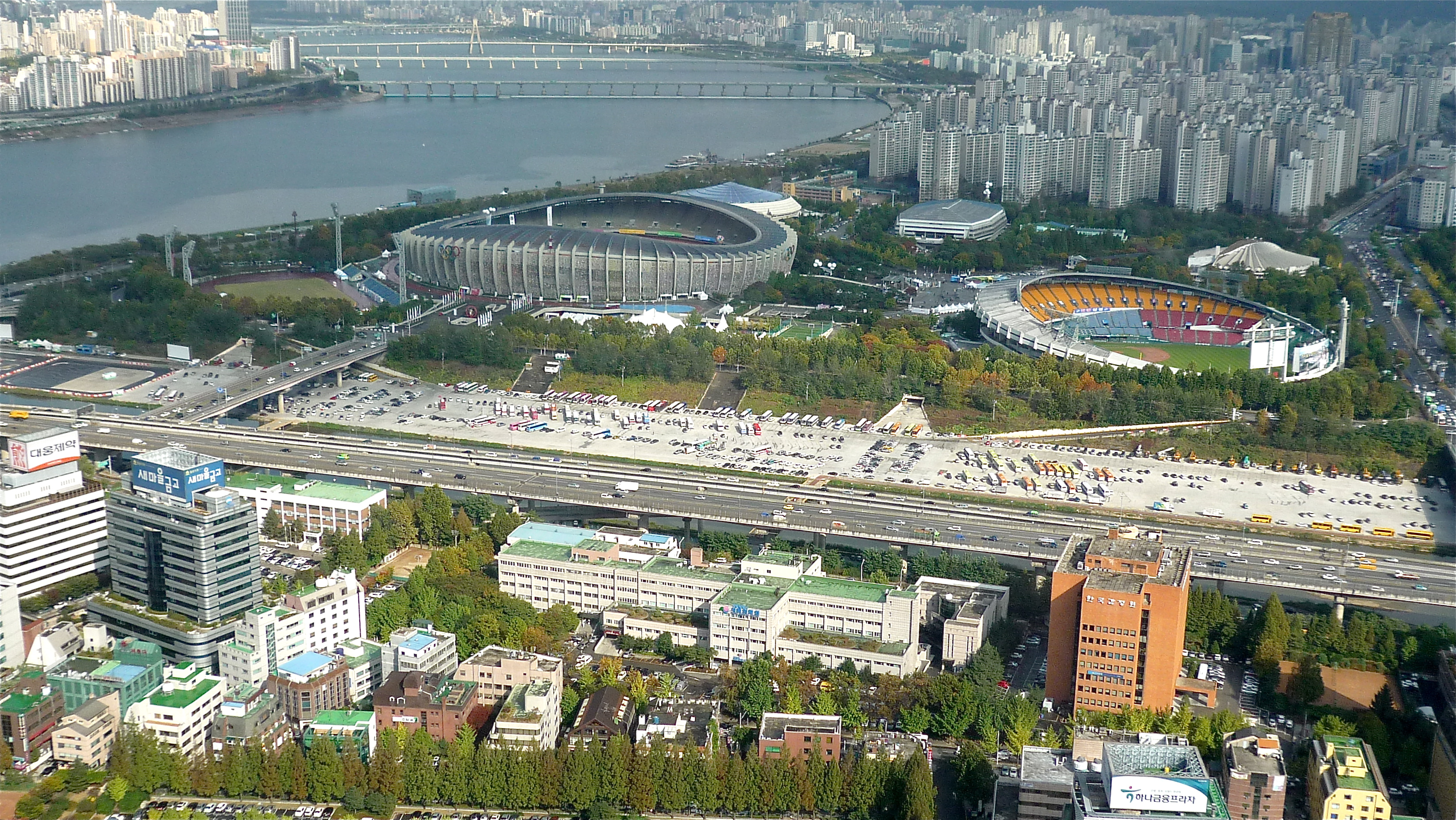
Seoul Olympic Stadium

The idea for South Korea to place a bid for the 1988 Games emerged during the last days of the Park Chung Hee administration in the late 1970s, as hosting the Olympics was a big opportunity to bring international attention to South Korea. But before that, it was necessary to prove the country's capacity, as South Korea was seen as an exotic and risky destination for large events. The project continued to run even after President Park's assassination in 1979. With the successful staging of Miss Universe 1980, and the subsequent decision to host the 1986 Asian Games in Seoul, Chun Doo-hwan, Park's successor, submitted Korea's bid to the IOC in September 1981, in hopes that the increased international exposure brought by the Olympics would legitimize his authoritarian regime amidst increasing political pressure for democratization and less rigidity in state policies. Further, he hoped it would provide protection from increasing threats from North Korea, and showcase the economic strength that the country was experiencing to the world. Seoul was awarded the bid on 30 September 1981, becoming the 16th nation in the Summer Olympics, as well as the second Asian nation (following Japan in the 1964 Summer Olympics) and the first mainland Asian nation to host the Olympics.

Influenced by the model of 1964 Summer Olympics held in Tokyo, which served as a rite of passage for the Japanese economy and re-integration of Japan in the international community in the post-war era, the South Korean government hoped to use the Olympics as a "coming-out party". The Olympics gave a powerful impetus to the development of South Korea's relations with Eastern Europe, the Soviet Union and with China. In January 1982, South Korea's curfew that had been in place since 1945 was lifted.

In utilizing media events theory, Larson and Park investigated the Seoul Olympics as a form of political communication. They revealed the significance of South Korea's military government throughout the period of the Olympic bid and preparation, followed by the many advantages of the hosting the Games: rapid economic modernization, social mobilization and the legitimization of the military dictatorship.

== Homeless camp expansion ==
Existing camps for "vagrants" (homeless persons) were ramped up before the 1988 Olympics. An Associated Press article states that homeless people and alcoholics, "but mostly children and the disabled" were arrested and sent to these camps to prepare for the Olympics. In addition, a prosecutor had his investigation into the Brothers Home camp limited at a number of levels of government "in part out of fear of an embarrassing international incident on the eve of the Olympics."

In 1975, the previous president of South Korea had begun a policy of rounding up vagrants. According to government documents obtained by the Associated Press, from 1981 to 1986 the number of people held increased from 8,600 to more than 16,000. Police officers often received promotions based on the number of vagrants they had arrested, and owners of facilities received a subsidy based on the number of people held. There were multiple reports of inmates raped or beaten, and sometimes beaten to death.

4,000 of these "vagrants" were held at the Brothers Home facility. Many of the guards were former inmates who had been "promoted" because of loyalty to the camp's owner. Various money-making operations were conducted such as manufacturing ball-point pens and fishing hooks, as well as clothing for Daewoo. Only a few inmates were paid belatedly for this work.

By accident while on a hunting trip, prosecutor Kim Yong-won heard about and visited a work detail of prisoners in ragged clothes overseen by guards with wooden bats and dogs. In his words, he knew immediately that "a very serious crime" was occurring, and in January 1987, he led a raid on the facility and found beaten and malnourished inmates. He was politically pressured at various levels to reduce the charges against the owner, managers, and guards. In the end, the owner only served 2 1/2 years in prison.

The Brothers Home was a religious facility based on the Christian faith. There were, in fact, inspections by both city officials and church officials. However, these were scheduled inspections in which healthier inmates were presented in carefully planned and orchestrated circumstances. There were no unannounced inspections.

In the 1990s, construction workers found about 100 human bones on a mountainside outside the location of the former Brothers Home. Victims of the Brothers Home are seeking a government investigation into the crimes committed and accountability.

== Boycott ==
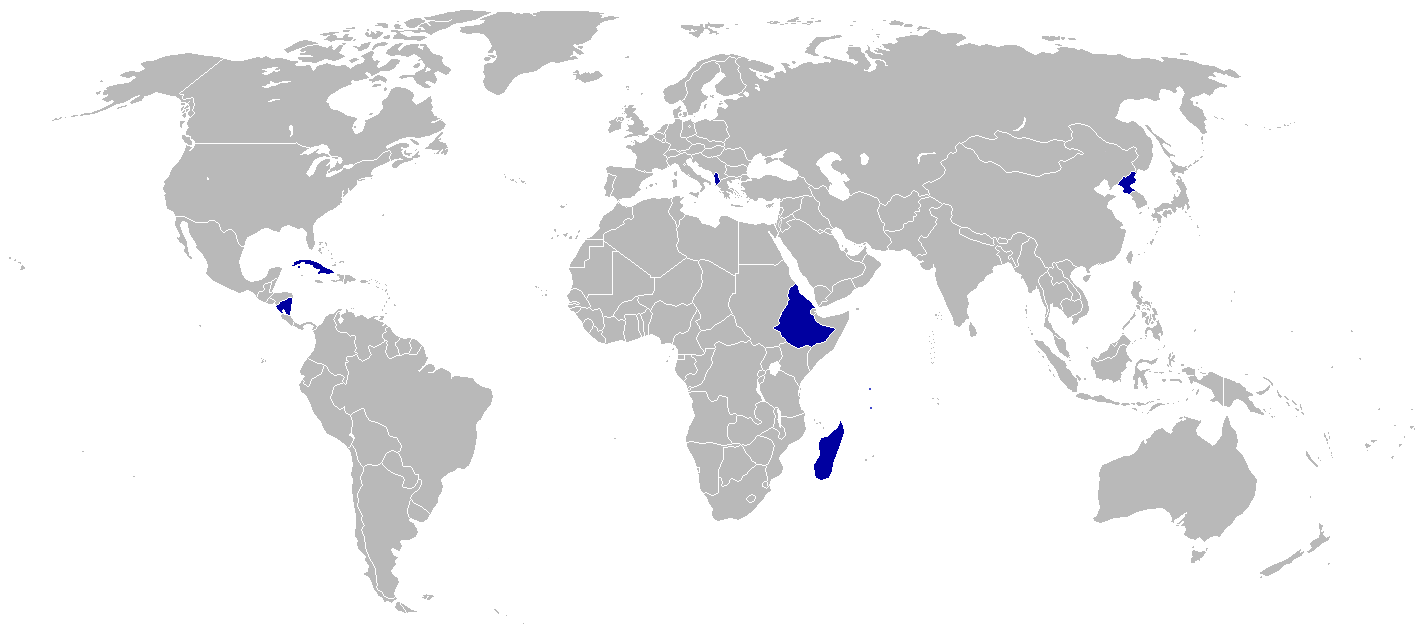
Countries boycotting or absent from the 1988 Games are shaded blue.

The games were boycotted by North Korea and its allies Cuba, Nicaragua, Ethiopia, and Madagascar.

North Korea had insisted upon co-hosting the Games, something that had been encouraged by Cuban president Fidel Castro, who called for North Korea to be considered joint host of the Games. On 8 and 9 January 1986 in Lausanne, Switzerland, the IOC President chaired a meeting of the North and South Korean Olympic Committees. North Korea demanded that eleven of the 23 Olympic sports be carried out on its territory, special opening and closing ceremonies, and a joint organizing committee and a united team. The negotiations were continued into another meeting, but were not successful.

North Korea then announced its boycott on September 3, 1988. The North Korean Central News Agency stated "this will leave another stain on Olympic history", and that "the 24th Olympic Games will be inevitably another crippled Olympiad where not all Olympic member states will participate".

Nicaragua had previously announced its intention to boycott on May 20, 1987. Moisés Hassan Morales, the Nicaraguan NOC president, stated "if the 1988 Olympics are not carried out in Pyongyang and Seoul, the two Korean capitals, Nicaragua will not attend this event".

Cuba made its boycott announcement on January 16, 1988, where it stated "Cuba deeply laments this decision, but our people and our athletes live by profound ethical norms and a great sense of honor".

Ethiopia announced on January 20, 1988, that it would boycott the 1988 Summer Olympics in solidarity with North Korea, Cuba, Nicaragua, and Madagascar, which had all criticized the decision disallowing North Korea to jointly organize the Games. The Ethiopian NOC said "at a time when the Korean people, who are divided against their will, are struggling for peaceful negotiations, Ethiopia strongly objects to the Olympic Games being conducted in South Korea which further strengthens disunity", adding that Ethiopia would participate "if the decision to keep the games in South Korea were reversed".

The Seoul Olympic Organizing Committee (SLOOC) closed the receipt of final entry applications for athletics on September 8, 1988. Among the 161 NOCs which officially notified their intention to participate in the Olympics, Madagascar failed to send in an entry form by the closing date, thus, its athletes did not compete at the Games. According to the SLOOC, Madagascar did this "in support of North Korea's co-hosting request".

Albania and the Seychelles did not respond to the invitations sent by the IOC.

== Official theme song ==
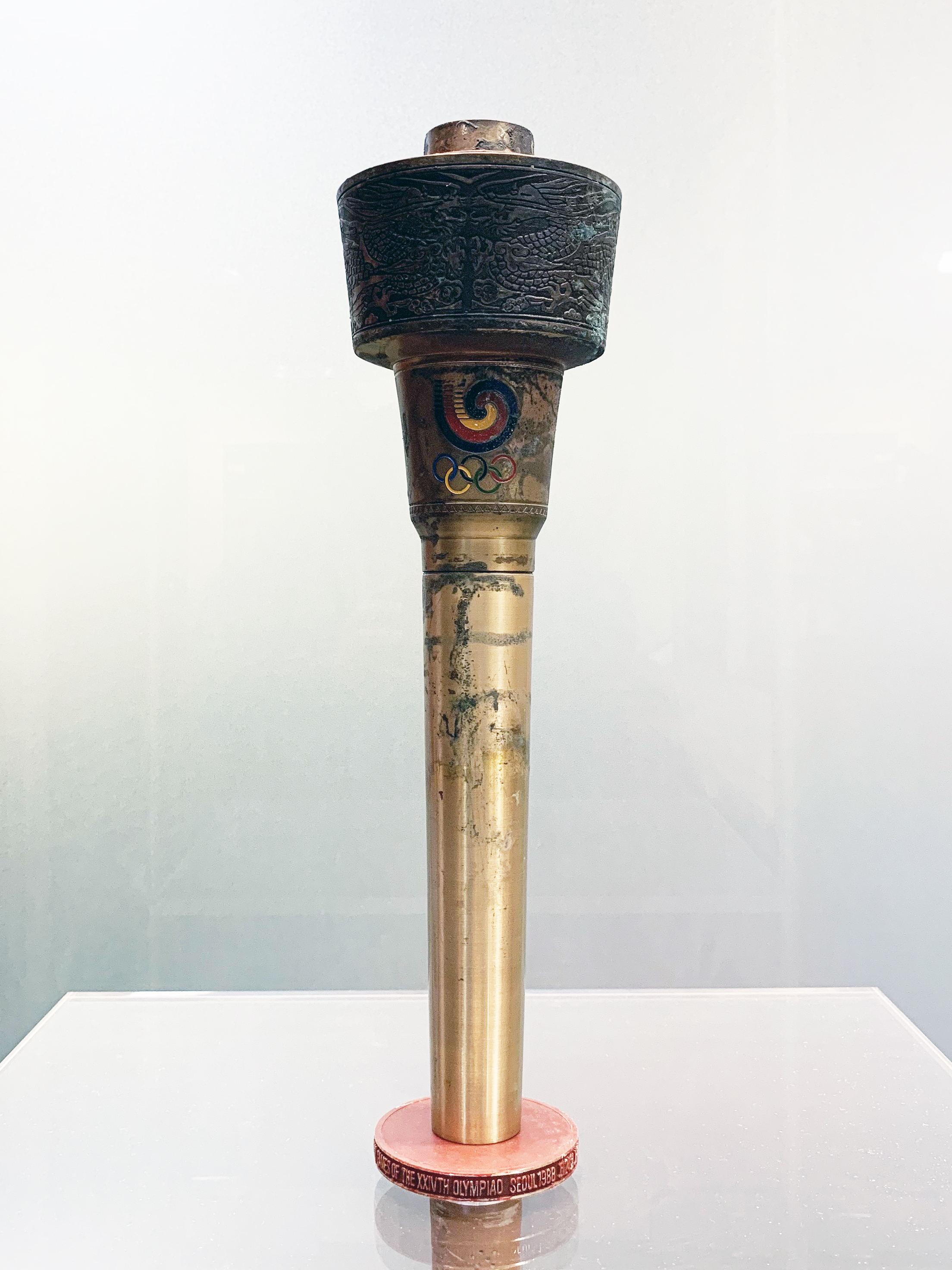
One of the Olympic Torches used during the 1988 Summer Olympics Torch Relay

The Seoul Olympic Organizing Committee (SLOOC) also produced and distributed an official song of the Seoul Games to publicize the Games to all National Olympic Committees, encouraging their participation and consolidating the idea of harmony and friendship of the entire world through the song. "Hand in Hand" was commissioned for the Italian composer Giorgio Moroder and the American songwriter Tom Whitlock, and was performed by local group Koreana.

== Venues ==
The World Peace Gate in Seoul

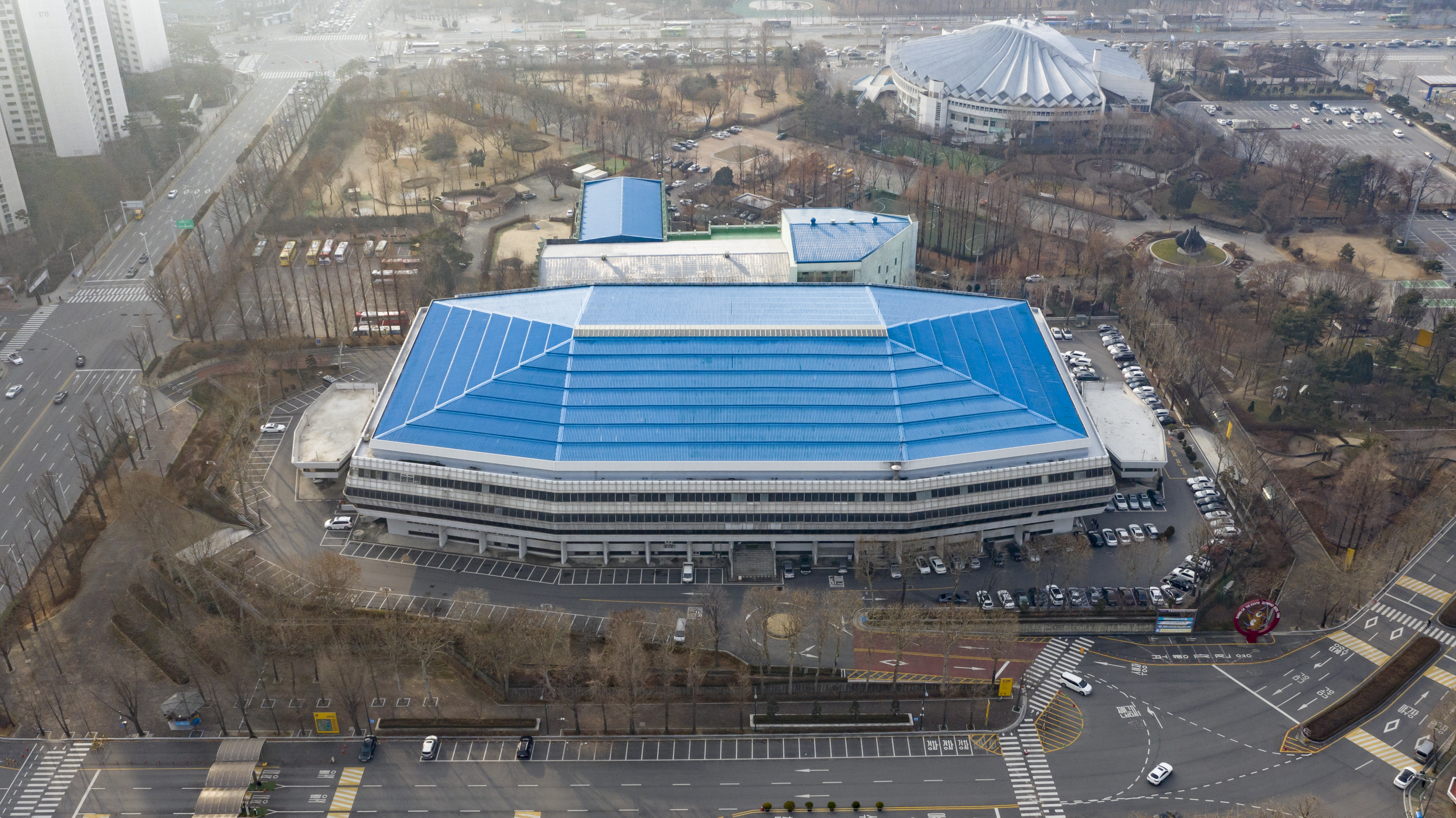
Jamsil Indoor Swimming Pool

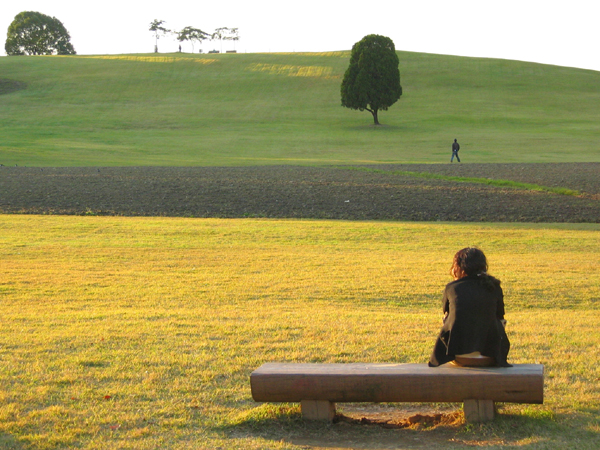
Seoul Olympic Park in autumn

- Seoul Sports Complex venues
  - Seoul Olympic Stadium^{[E]} – opening/closing ceremonies, athletics, equestrian (jumping individual final), football (final)
  - Jamsil Indoor Swimming Pool^{[E]} – diving, modern pentathlon (swimming), synchronized swimming, swimming, water polo
  - Jamsil Gymnasium^{[E]} – basketball, volleyball (final)
  - Jamsil Students' Gymnasium^{[E]} – boxing
  - Jamsil Baseball Stadium^{[E]} – baseball (demonstration)
- Olympic Park venues
  - Olympic Velodrome^{[N]} – cycling (track)
  - Olympic Weightlifting Gymnasium^{[N]} – weightlifting
  - Olympic Fencing Gymnasium^{[N]} – fencing, modern pentathlon (fencing)
  - Olympic Gymnastics Hall^{[N]} – gymnastics
  - Olympic Tennis Center^{[N]} – tennis
  - Mongchon Tosong^{[N]} – modern pentathlon (running)
- Other venues in metropolitan Seoul
  - Seoul Equestrian Park– equestrian (all but jumping individual final), modern pentathlon (riding)
  - Han River Regatta Course/Canoeing Site Course^{[N]} – canoeing, rowing
  - Saemaul Sports Hall^{[N]} – volleyball preliminaries
  - Hanyang University Gymnasium^{[N]} – volleyball preliminaries
  - Changchung Gymnasium^{[E]} – judo, taekwondo (demonstration)
  - Seoul National University Gymnasium – badminton (demonstration), table tennis
  - Royal Bowling Center^{[E]} – bowling (demonstration)
  - Dongdaemun Stadium^{[E]} – football preliminaries
  - Hwarang Archery Field^{[E]}, Nowon District – archery
  - Taenung International Shooting Range^{[E]}, Taenung – modern pentathlon (shooting), shooting
  - Streets of Seoul – athletics (20 km/ 50 km walk, marathon)
  - Jangchung Gymnasium – taekwondo (demonstration), judo
- Venues outside Seoul
  - Sangmu Gymnasium^{[N]}, Seongnam – wrestling
  - Daejeon Stadium^{[E]}, Daejeon – football preliminaries
  - Daegu Stadium^{[E]}, Daegu – football preliminaries
  - Busan Stadium^{[E]}, Busan – football preliminaries
  - Gwangju Stadium^{[E]}, Gwangju – football preliminaries
  - Suwon Gymnasium^{[N]}, Suwon – handball
  - Seongnam Stadium^{[E]}, Seongnam – field hockey
  - Busan Yachting Center^{[N]}, Busan – sailing
  - Tongillo Road Course – cycling (individual road race, road team time trial)

^{E} Existing facilities modified or refurbished in preparation for the Olympic Games.
^{N} New facilities constructed in preparation for the Olympic Games.

== Cost ==
According to The Oxford Olympics Study data is not available to establish the cost of the Seoul 1988 Summer Olympics. The cost of the stadium was 491 billion won, approximately US$354 million.

== Sports ==
The 1988 Summer Olympics featured 23 different sports encompassing 31 disciplines, and medals were awarded in 237 events. In the list below, the number of events in each discipline is noted in parentheses.

- Aquatics
  - Diving (4)
  - Swimming (31)
  - Synchronized swimming (2)
  - Water polo (1)
- Archery (4)
- Athletics (42)
- Basketball (2)
- Boxing (12)
- Canoeing (12)
- Cycling
  - Road (3)
  - Track (6)
- Equestrian
  - Dressage (2)
  - Eventing (2)
  - Show jumping (2)
- Fencing (8)
- Field hockey (2)
- Football (1)
- Gymnastics
  - Artistic (14)
  - Rhythmic (1)
- Handball (2)
- Judo (7)
- Modern pentathlon (2)
- Rowing (14)
- Sailing (8)
- Shooting (13)
- Table tennis (4)
- Tennis (4)
- Volleyball (2)
- Weightlifting (10)
- Wrestling
  - Freestyle (10)
  - Greco-Roman (10)

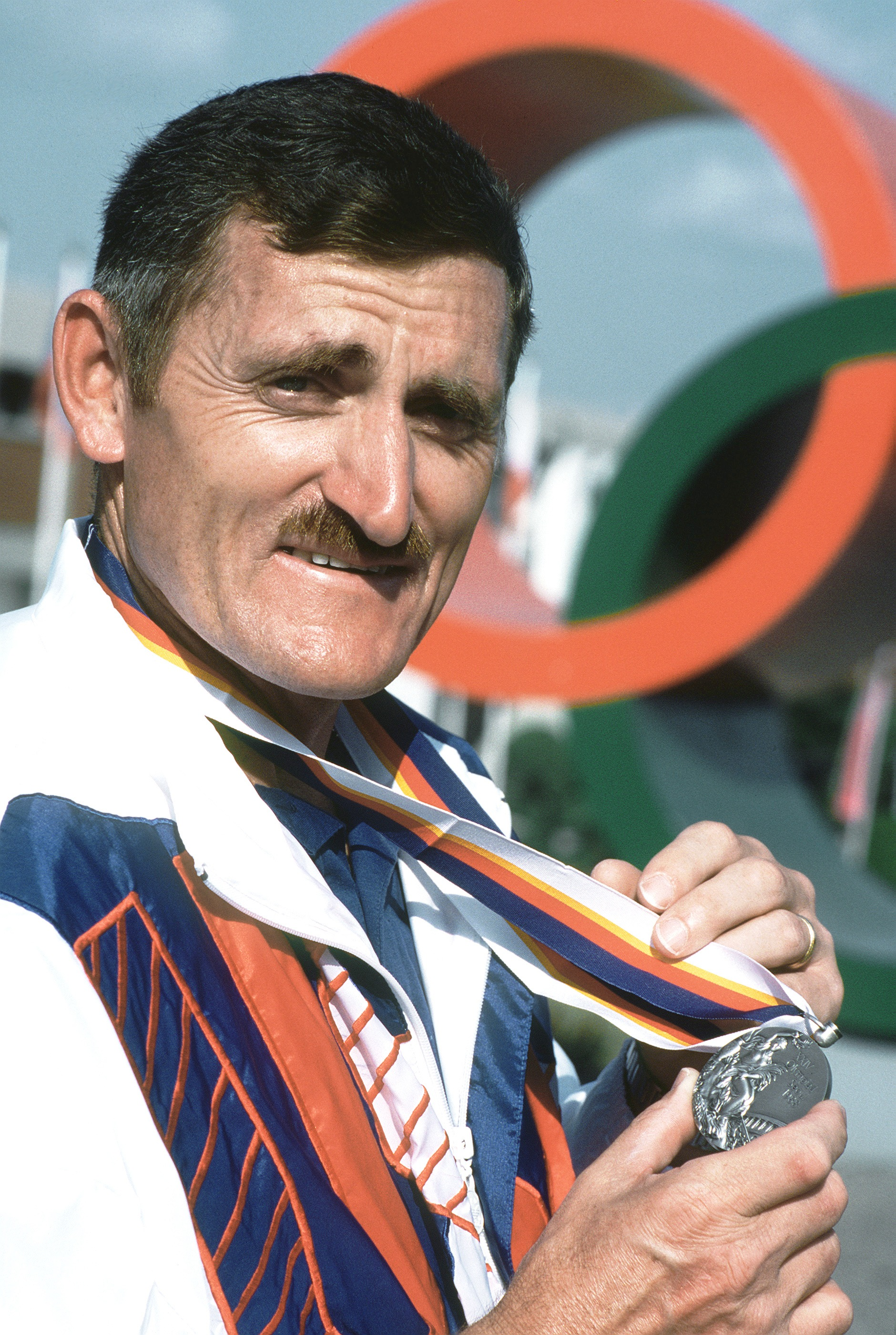
Erich Buljung shows a silver medal he won in the 10m air pistol competition at the 1988 Summer Olympics.

=== Demonstration ===
- Baseball ()
- Women's Judo ()
- Taekwondo ()

=== Exhibition ===
Badminton and bowling were held as exhibition sports, which did not require IOC approval and were not part of the official Olympic schedule.

- Badminton ()
- Bowling ()

== Calendar ==
All times are local KST (UTC+10)

Note: between May 8 and October 9, 1988, all the clocks in the country were advanced by one hour as a test of the possibility of adopting the daylight summer time in the country in the future. This advance also enabled the development of a sports calendar in which the main events were scheduled to be broadcast in major Western markets in television prime time.

●	Opening ceremony	Event competitions	●	Event finals	●	Closing ceremony

Date	September														October	
Date	17th Sat	18th Sun	19th Mon	20th Tue	21st Wed	22nd Thu	23rd Fri	24th Sat	25th Sun	26th Mon	27th Tue	28th Wed	29th Thu	30th Fri	1st Sat	2nd Sun
Archery														● ●	● ●	
Athletics							● ● ●	● ● ●	● ● ● ● ●	● ● ● ● ● ● ● ●		● ● ● ● ●	● ● ● ●	● ● ● ●	● ● ● ● ● ● ● ● ●	●
Basketball													●	●		
Boxing															● ● ● ● ● ●	● ● ● ● ● ●
Canoeing														● ● ● ● ● ●	● ● ● ● ● ●	
Cycling		●		●		●		● ● ● ●		●	●					
Diving		●		●					●		●					
Equestrian						● ●			●		●	●				●
Fencing					●	●	●	●			●	●	●	●		
Field hockey														●	●	
Football (soccer)															●	
Gymnastics				●	●	●	●	● ● ● ● ● ●	● ● ● ●					●		
Handball													●		●	
Judo									●	●	●	●	●	●	●	
Modern pentathlon						● ●										
Rowing								● ● ● ● ● ● ●	● ● ● ● ● ● ●							
Sailing											● ● ● ● ● ● ● ●					
Shooting		● ●	● ●	● ●	● ●	●	● ●	● ●								
Swimming			● ● ● ●		● ● ● ● ●	● ● ● ● ●	● ● ● ● ●	● ● ● ● ● ●	● ● ● ● ● ●							
Synchronized swimming														●	●	
Table tennis														● ●	● ●	
Tennis														● ●	● ●	
Volleyball													●			●
Water polo															●	
Weightlifting		●	●	●	●	●		●	●	●	●		●			
Wrestling				● ● ●	● ● ● ●	● ● ●							● ● ●	● ● ●	● ● ● ●	
Total gold medals		5	7	9	14	17	12	30	26	9	15	9	11	36	37	9
Ceremonies	●															●
Date	17th Sat	18th Sun	19th Mon	20th Tue	21st Wed	22nd Thu	23rd Fri	24th Sat	25th Sun	26th Mon	27th Tue	28th Wed	29th Thu	30th Fri	1st Sat	2nd Sun
Date	September														October	

== Participating National Olympic Committees ==
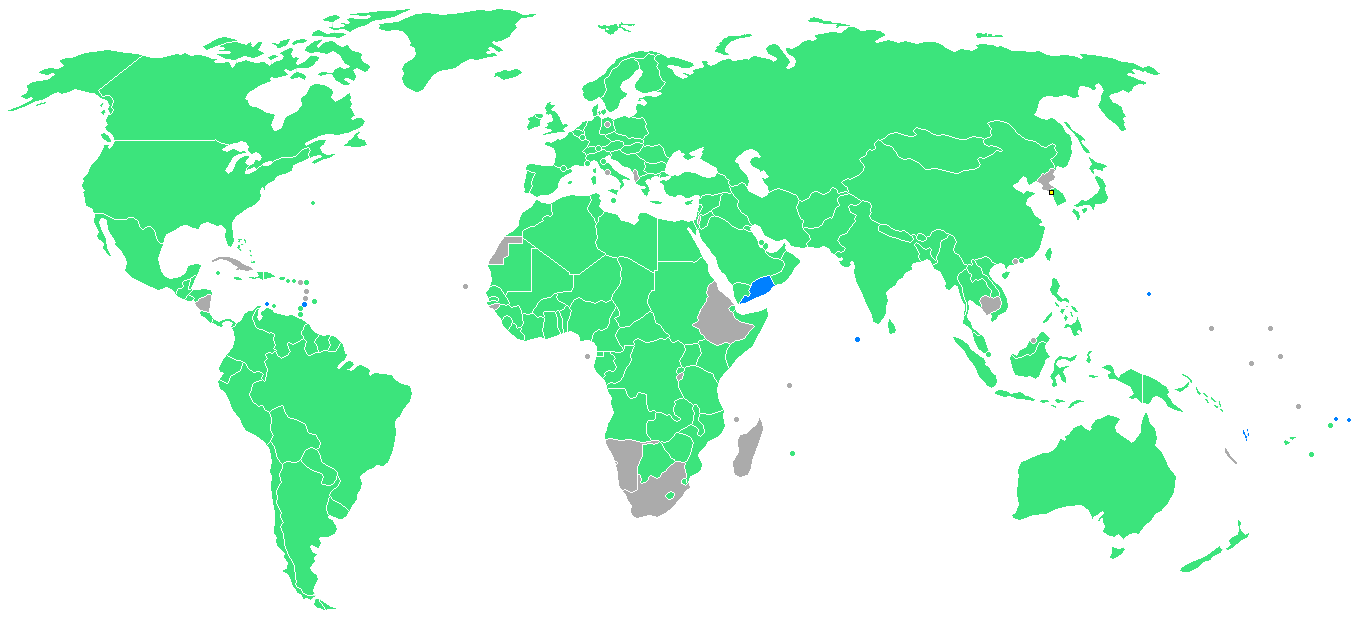
Participants (blue nations had their first entrance)

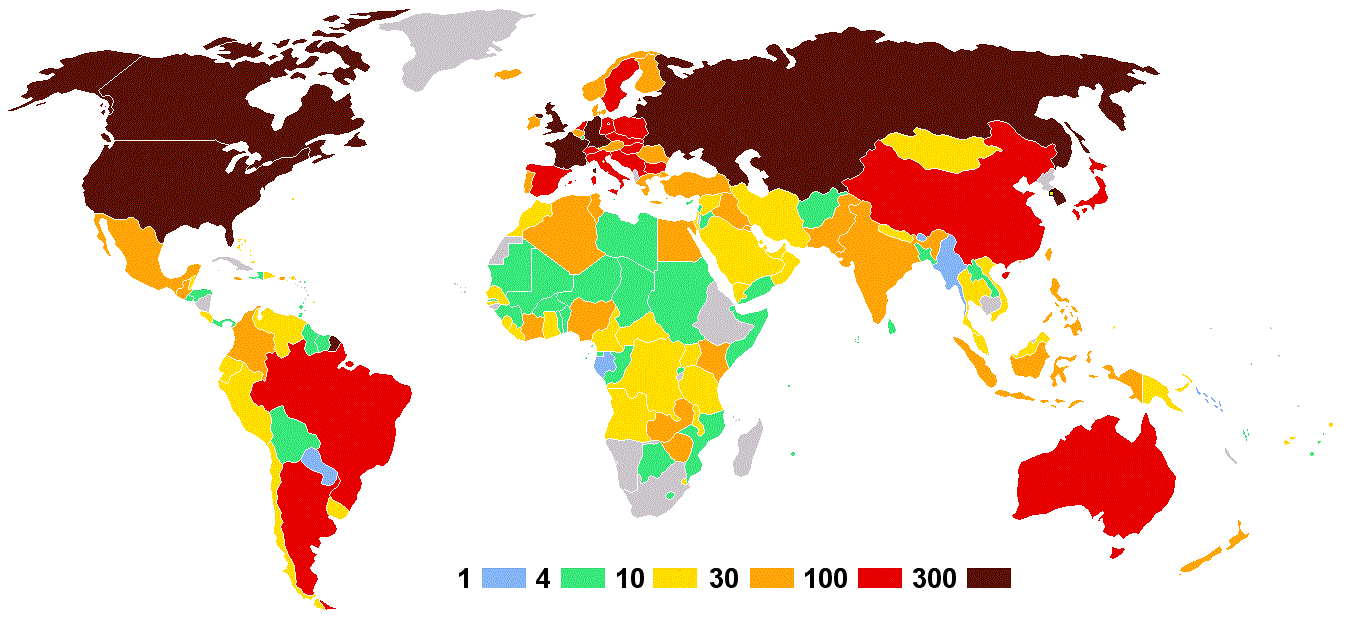
Number of athletes sent by each nation

Athletes from 160 nations competed at the Seoul Games. Aruba, American Samoa, Brunei, Cook Islands, Maldives, Vanuatu, Saint Vincent and the Grenadines, and South Yemen made their first Olympic appearance at these Games. Guam made their first Summer Olympic appearance at these games having participated in the 1988 Winter Olympics in Calgary.

In the following list, the number in parentheses indicates the number of athletes from each nation that competed in Seoul:

Participating National Olympic Committees
- Afghanistan (5)
- Algeria (42)
- American Samoa (6)
- Andorra (3)
- Angola (24)
- Antigua and Barbuda (15)
- Argentina (118)
- Aruba (8)
- Australia (252)
- Austria (73)
- Bahamas (16)
- Bahrain (7)
- Bangladesh (6)
- Barbados (17)
- Belgium (59)
- Belize (10)
- Benin (7)
- Bermuda (12)
- Bhutan (3)
- Bolivia (7)
- Botswana (8)
- Brazil (160)
- British Virgin Islands (3)
- Bulgaria (172)
- Burkina Faso (6)
- Brunei (0)
- Burma (2)
- Cameroon (15)
- Canada (328)
- Cayman Islands (8)
- Central African Republic (15)
- Chad (6)
- Chile (17)
- China (273)
- Colombia (40)
- Republic of the Congo (7)
- Cook Islands (7)
- Costa Rica (16)
- Cyprus (9)
- Czechoslovakia (163)
- Denmark (78)
- Djibouti (6)
- Dominican Republic (16)
- Ecuador (13)
- Egypt (49)
- El Salvador (6)
- Equatorial Guinea (6)
- Fiji (23)
- Finland (78)
- France (266)
- Gabon (2)
- The Gambia (6)
- East Germany (259)
- West Germany (347)
- Ghana (16)
- Great Britain (345)
- Greece (56)
- Grenada (6)
- Guam (19)
- Guatemala (28)
- Guinea (6)
- Guyana (8)
- Haiti (4)
- Honduras (8)
- Hong Kong (48)
- Hungary (188)
- Iceland (32)
- India (46)
- Indonesia (29)
- Iran (23)
- Iraq (27)
- Ireland (61)
- Israel (18)
- Italy (253)
- Ivory Coast (28)
- Jamaica (35)
- Japan (255)
- Jordan (7)
- Kenya (74)
- South Korea (401) (host)
- Kuwait (25)
- Laos (3)
- Lebanon (21)
- Lesotho (6)
- Liberia (8)
- Libya (6)
- Liechtenstein (12)
- Luxembourg (8)
- Malawi (16)
- Malaysia (9)
- Maldives (7)
- Mali (6)
- Malta (6)
- Mauritania (6)
- Mauritius (8)
- Mexico (83)
- Monaco (9)
- Mongolia (28)
- Morocco (27)
- Mozambique (8)
- Nepal (16)
- Netherlands (147)
- Netherlands Antilles (3)
- New Zealand (83)
- Niger (6)
- Nigeria (69)
- Norway (69)
- Oman (8)
- Pakistan (30)
- Panama (6)
- Papua New Guinea (11)
- Paraguay (10)
- Peru (21)
- Philippines (31)
- Poland (143)
- Portugal (65)
- Puerto Rico (47)
- Qatar (10)
- Romania (68)
- Rwanda (6)
- Saint Vincent and the Grenadines (6)
- San Marino (11)
- Saudi Arabia (9)
- Senegal (23)
- Sierra Leone (12)
- Singapore (8)
- Solomon Islands (4)
- Somalia (5)
- Soviet Union (481)
- Spain (229)
- Sri Lanka (6)
- Sudan (8)
- Suriname (6)
- Swaziland (11)
- Sweden (184)
- Switzerland (99)
- Syria (13)
- Chinese Taipei (61)
- Tanzania (10)
- Thailand (14)
- Togo (6)
- Tonga (5)
- Trinidad and Tobago (6)
- Tunisia (41)
- Turkey (41)
- Uganda (24)
- United Arab Emirates (12)
- United States (527)
- Uruguay (15)
- Vanuatu (4)
- Venezuela (17)
- Vietnam (9)
- Virgin Islands (22)
- Western Samoa (11)
- North Yemen (8)
- South Yemen (5)
- Yugoslavia (155)
- Zaire (15)
- Zambia (29)
- Zimbabwe (29)

Note: Brunei participated in the Opening Ceremonies and Closing Ceremonies, marking its first appearance at the Olympic Games, but its delegation consisted of only one swimming official.

- When the team from the Dominican Republic marched in during the Parade of Nations, the superimposed map erroneously showed the location of Cuba, a nation that did not take part at the Games.

=== Number of athletes by National Olympic Committee ===
8,453 athletes from 159 NOCs

IOC Letter Code	Country	Athletes
AFG	Afghanistan	5
ALG	Algeria	42
ASA	American Samoa	6
AND	Andorra	3
ANG	Angola	24
ANT	Antigua and Barbuda	15
ARG	Argentina	118
ARU	Aruba	8
AUS	Australia	252
AUT	Austria	73
BAH	Bahamas	16
BRN	Bahrain	7
BAN	Bangladesh	6
BAR	Barbados	17
BEL	Belgium	59
BIZ	Belize	10
BEN	Benin	7
BER	Bermuda	12
BHU	Bhutan	3
BOL	Bolivia	7
BOT	Botswana	8
BRA	Brazil	160
IVB	British Virgin Islands	3
BUL	Bulgaria	172
BUR	Burkina Faso	6
BRU	Brunei	0
BIR	Burma	2
CMR	Cameroon	15
CAN	Canada	328
CAY	Cayman Islands	8
CAF	Central African Republic	15
CHA	Chad	6
CHI	Chile	17
CHN	China	273
COL	Colombia	40
CGO	Republic of the Congo	7
COK	Cook Islands	7
CRC	Costa Rica	16
CYP	Cyprus	9
TCH	Czechoslovakia	163
DEN	Denmark	78
DJI	Djibouti	6
DOM	Dominican Republic	16
ECU	Ecuador	13
EGY	Egypt	49
ESA	El Salvador	6
GEQ	Equatorial Guinea	6
FIJ	Fiji	23
FIN	Finland	78
FRA	France	266
GAB	Gabon	2
GAM	The Gambia	6
GDR	East Germany	259
FRG	West Germany	347
PLE	Ghana	16
GBR	Great Britain	345
GRE	Greece	56
GRN	Grenada	6
GUM	Guam	19
GUA	Guatemala	28
GUI	Guinea	6
GUY	Guyana	8
HAI	Haiti	4
HON	Honduras	8
HKG	Hong Kong	48
HUN	Hungary	188
ISL	Iceland	32
IND	India	46
INA	Indonesia	29
IRN	Iran	23
IRQ	Iraq	27
IRL	Ireland	61
ISR	Israel	18
ITA	Italy	253
CIV	Ivory Coast	28
JAM	Jamaica	35
JPN	Japan	255
JOR	Jordan	7
KEN	Kenya	74
KOR	South Korea	401
KUW	Kuwait	25
LAO	Laos	3
LIB	Lebanon	21
LES	Lesotho	6
LBR	Liberia	8
LBA	Libya	6
LIE	Liechtenstein	12
LUX	Luxembourg	8
MAW	Malawi	16
MAS	Malaysia	9
MDV	Maldives	7
MLI	Mali	6
MLT	Malta	6
MTN	Mauritania	6
MRI	Mauritius	8
MEX	Mexico	83
MON	Monaco	9
MGL	Mongolia	28
MAR	Morocco	27
MOZ	Mozambique	8
NEP	Nepal	16
HOL	Netherlands	147
AHO	Netherlands Antilles	3
NZL	New Zealand	83
NIG	Niger	6
NGR	Nigeria	69
NOR	Norway	69
OMA	Oman	8
PAK	Pakistan	30
PAN	Panama	6
NGU	Papua New Guinea	11
PAR	Paraguay	10
PER	Peru	21
PHI	Philippines	31
POL	Poland	143
POR	Portugal	65
PUR	Puerto Rico	47
QAT	Qatar	10
ROM	Romania	68
RWA	Rwanda	6
VIN	Saint Vincent and the Grenadines	6
SMR	San Marino	11
KSA	Saudi Arabia	9
SEN	Senegal	23
SLE	Sierra Leone	12
SIN	Singapore	8
SOL	Solomon Islands	4
SOM	Somalia	5
URS	Soviet Union	481
ESP	Spain	229
SRI	Sri Lanka	6
SUD	Sudan	8
SUR	Suriname	6
SWZ	Swaziland	11
SWE	Sweden	184
SUI	Switzerland	99
SYR	Syria	13
TPE	Chinese Taipei	61
TAN	Tanzania	10
THA	Thailand	14
TOG	Togo	6
TGA	Tonga	5
TRI	Trinidad and Tobago	6
TUN	Tunisia	41
TUR	Turkey	41
UGA	Uganda	24
UAE	United Arab Emirates	12
USA	United States	527
URU	Uruguay	15
VAN	Vanuatu	4
VEN	Venezuela	17
VIE	Vietnam	9
ISV	Virgin Islands	22
WSM	Western Samoa	11
YAR	North Yemen	8
YMD	South Yemen	5
YUG	Yugoslavia	155
ZAI	Zaire	15
ZAM	Zambia	29
ZIM	Zimbabwe	29

== Medal table ==
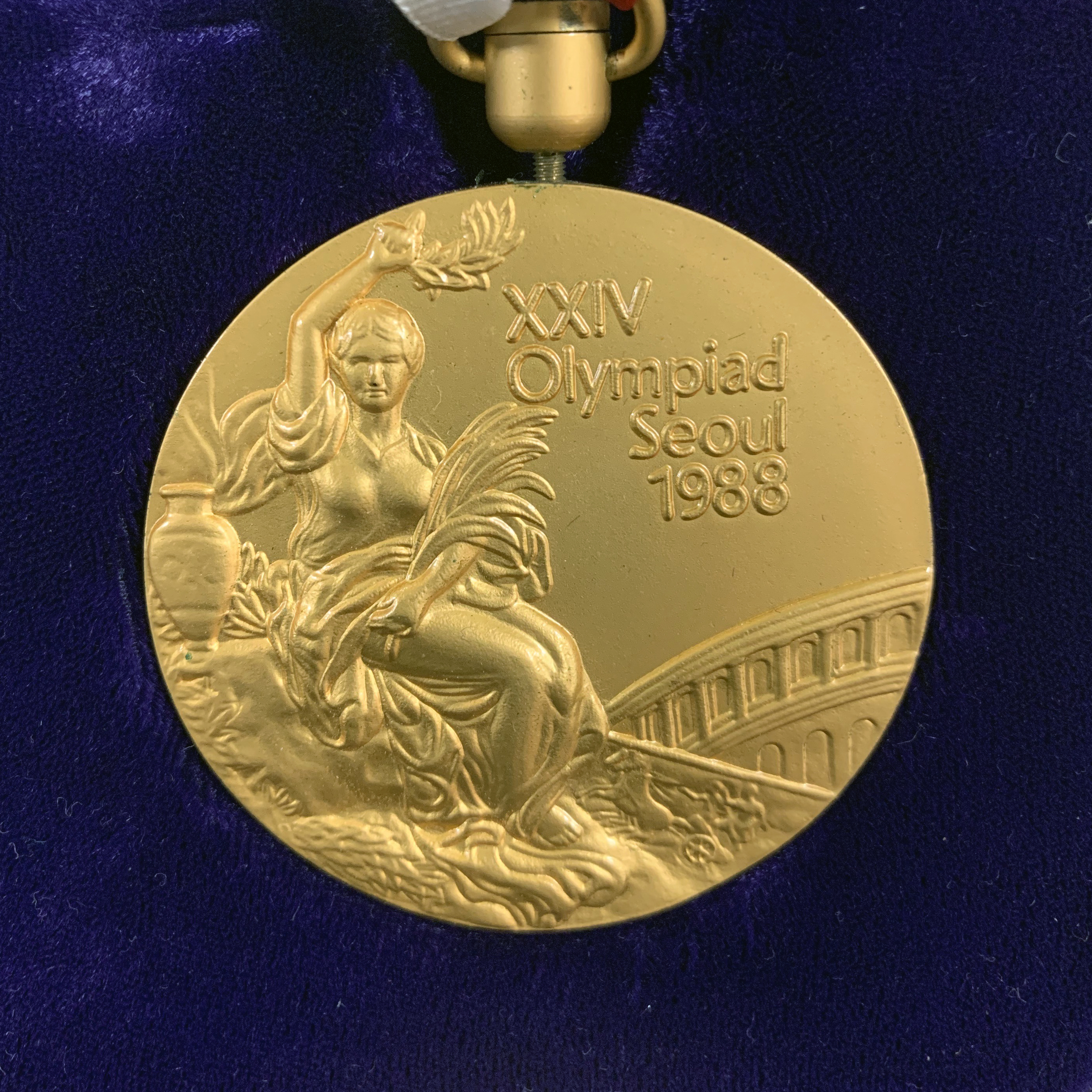
Gold medal of the 1988 Summer Olympics in Seoul

These are the top ten nations that won medals at the 1988 Games.

* Host nation (South Korea)

1988 Summer Olympics medal table
Rank	NOC	Gold	Silver	Bronze	Total
1	Soviet Union	55	31	46	132
2	East Germany	37	35	30	102
3	United States	36	31	27	94
4	South Korea*	12	10	11	33
5	West Germany	11	14	15	40
6	Hungary	11	6	6	23
7	Bulgaria	10	12	13	35
8	Romania	7	11	6	24
9	France	6	4	6	16
10	Italy	6	4	4	14
11–52	Remaining NOCs	50	76	100	226
Totals (52 entries)		241	234	264	739

== Mascot ==
The official mascot for the 1988 Summer Olympic Games was Hodori. It was a stylized tiger designed by Kim Hyun as an amicable Amur tiger, portraying the friendly and hospitable traditions of the Korean people. Hodori's female version was called Hosuni.

The name 호돌이 Hodori was chosen from 2,295 suggestions sent in by the public. It is a compound of 호 ho, the Sino-Korean bound morpheme for "tiger" (appearing also in the usual word 호랑이 horangi for "tiger"), and 돌이 dori, a diminutive for "boys".

== Broadcasting ==
In the United States, NBC became the telecast provider hereafter for the Summer Games, after a five-Olympics run by the American Broadcasting Company from 1968 to 1984.

NBC's coverage was their first sporting event to feature the new Quantel Cypher to generate the on-screen graphics. However, the network would continue to use Chyron Corporation for the rest of the year with Quantel being used again for the 1988 World Series. The Cypher would be implemented permanently starting with Super Bowl XXIII in January 1989.

== Doping ==
Name	Country	Sport	Banned substance	Medals	Ref.
Ali Dad	Afghanistan	Wrestling	Furosemide		
Kerrith Brown	Great Britain	Judo	Furosemide	(bronze) (71 kg)	
Kalman Csengeri	Hungary	Weightlifting	Stanozolol		
Mitko Grablev	Bulgaria	Weightlifting	Furosemide	(gold) (56 kg)	
Angell Guenchev	Bulgaria	Weightlifting	Furosemide	(gold) (67.5 kg)	
Ben Johnson	Canada	Athletics	Stanozolol	(gold) (men's 100 m)	
Fernando Mariaca	Spain	Weightlifting	Pemoline		
Jorge Quesada	Spain	Modern pentathlon	Propranolol		
Andor Szanyi	Hungary	Weightlifting	Stanozolol	(silver) (100 kg)	
Alexander Watson	Australia	Modern Pentathlon	Caffeine		

In 2003, Wade Exum, the United States Olympic Committee's director of drug control administration from 1991 to 2000, released documents that showed Carl Lewis had tested positive three times at the 1988 United States Olympic trials for minimum amounts of pseudoephedrine, ephedrine, and phenylpropanolamine, which were banned stimulants. Bronchodilators are also found in cold medication. Due to the rules, his case could have led to disqualification from the Seoul Olympics and suspension from competition for six months. The levels of the combined stimulants registered in the separate tests were 2 ppm, 4 ppm and 6 ppm. Lewis defended himself, claiming that he had accidentally consumed the banned substances. After the supplements that he had taken were analyzed to prove his claims, the USOC accepted his claim of inadvertent use, since a dietary supplement he ingested was found to contain "Ma huang", the Chinese name for Ephedra (ephedrine is known to help weight loss). Fellow Santa Monica Track Club teammates Joe DeLoach and Floyd Heard were also found to have low levels of the same stimulants in their systems, and were cleared to compete for the same reason. The highest level of the stimulants Lewis recorded was 6 ppm, which was regarded as a positive test in 1988 but is now regarded as negative test. The acceptable level has been raised to ten parts per million for ephedrine and twenty-five parts per million for other substances. According to the IOC rules at the time, positive tests with levels lower than 10 ppm were cause of further investigation but not immediate ban. Neal Benowitz, a professor of medicine at UC San Francisco who is an expert on ephedrine and other stimulants, agreed that "These [levels] are what you'd see from someone taking cold or allergy medicines and are unlikely to have any effect on performance." Following Exum's revelations the IAAF acknowledged that at the 1988 Olympic Trials the USOC indeed followed the correct procedures in dealing with eight positive findings for ephedrine and ephedrine-related compounds in low concentration. Additionally, in 1988 the federation reviewed the relevant documents with the athletes' names undisclosed and stated that "the medical committee felt satisfied, however, on the basis of the information received that the cases had been properly concluded by the USOC as 'negative cases' in accordance with the rules and regulations in place at the time and no further action was taken".

== See also ==
- 1988 Summer Paralympics
- 1988 Winter Paralympics
- 1988 Winter Olympics
- Olympic Games held in South Korea
  - 1988 Summer Olympics – Seoul
  - 2018 Winter Olympics – Pyeongchang
- List of IOC country codes
- 1988 Summer Olympics Album: One Moment in Time
- Use of performance-enhancing drugs in the Olympic Games – 1988 Seoul

Summer Olympics
Preceded by Los Angeles	XXIV Olympiad; Seoul; 1988	Succeeded by Barcelona
