= List of Olympic venues in athletics =

For the Summer Olympics, there are 60 venues that have been or will be used for athletics. These venues have been the main stadium that has also served as host for both the opening and closing ceremonies of the Summer Olympics, with a notable exception being the Estádio Olímpico Nilton Santos, who hosted athletics events at Rio 2016; the ceremonies were hosted in the Maracanã.

Other uses for the stadiums have included the FIFA World Cup, the Major League Baseball All-Star Game, the World Series, the National Football League's Super Bowl, the Asian Games, the Pan American Games (North and South America), and the IAAF World Championships in Athletics.

For the FIFA World Cup, the athletic stadiums of 1908 (1966), 1924 (1938 final), 1936 (1974, 2006 final), 1948 (1966 final), 1960 (1990 final), 1968 (1970 and 1986), 1972 (1974 final), and 1980 (2018) hosted the final match.

As of 2019, eight of the athletic stadiums have played host to seven IAAF World Championships in Athletics. They are from 1936 (2009), 1952 (1983, 2005), 1960 (1987), 1964 (1991), 1980 (2013), 2004 (1997), 2008 (2015, 2027), 2012 (2017), and 2020 (2025).

Two athletic stadiums used for the Summer Olympics have hosted the Asian Games. They are 1964 (1958) and 1988 (1986). Two other stadiums played host to the Pan American Games were from 1968 (1955) and 2016 (2007).

Three athletic venues hosted the Major League Baseball All-Star Game with the stadium for 1932 and 1984 hosting the second 1959 game, the 1976 venue hosting in 1982, and the 1996 venue (reconfigured as Turner Field after the 1996 Games) in 2000. The World Series would be hosted at the 1932 and 1984 athletics Summer Olympics in 1959 while the 1996 athletics venue would host forty years later. The 1976 athletics venue hosted the Canadian Football League Grey Cup six times between 1977 and 2008. Finally, the athletics venues used for the 1932 and 1984 Summer Olympics played host to the National Football League's Super Bowl's I and VII.

== List ==
Games	Venue	Other sports hosted at venues for games	Capacity	Ref.
1896 Athens	Marathon (city) (Marathon start)	Cycling (Individual road race)	Not listed.	
1896 Athens	Panathinaiko Stadium	Gymnastics, Weightlifting, and Wrestling	80,000	
1900 Paris	Croix-Catelan Stadium	None	Not listed.	
1904 St. Louis	Francis Field	Archery, Cycling, Football, Gymnastics, Lacrosse, Roque, Tennis, Tug of war, Weightlifting, and Wrestling	19,000.	
1908 London	White City Stadium	Archery, Cycling (track), Diving, Field hockey, Football, Gymnastics, Lacrosse, Rugby union, Swimming, Tug of war, Water polo (final), Wrestling	68,000.	
1912 Stockholm	Stockholm Olympic Stadium	Equestrian, Football (final), Gymnastics, Modern pentathlon (running), Tug of war, Wrestling	33,000.	
1920 Antwerp	Olympisch Stadion	Equestrian, Field hockey, Football (final), Gymnastics, Modern pentathlon, Rugby union, Tug of war, Weightlifting	30,000	
1924 Paris	Stade de Colombes	Cycling (road), Equestrian, Fencing, Football (final), Gymnastics, Modern pentathlon (fencing, running), Rugby union, Tennis	60,000	
1928 Amsterdam	Olympic Stadium	Cycling (track), Equestrian (jumping), Football (final), Gymnastics	33,025	
1932 Los Angeles	Olympic Stadium	Equestrian (eventing, jumping), Field hockey, Gymnastics	105,000	
1932 Los Angeles	Riverside Drive at Griffith Park (50 km walk)	None	Not listed.	
1936 Berlin	Avus Motor Road (Marathon, 50 km walk)	Cycling (road)	Not listed.	
1936 Berlin	Olympic Stadium	Equestrian (jumping), Football (final), Handball (final)	110,000	
1948 London	Empire Stadium	Equestrian (jumping), Field hockey (medal matches), Football (medal matches)	82,000	
1952 Helsinki	Olympic Stadium	Equestrian (jumping), Football (final)	70,000	
1956 Melbourne	Melbourne Cricket Ground	Field hockey (final), Football (final)	104,000	
1960 Rome	Arch of Constantine (Marathon – finish line)	None	Not listed.	
1960 Rome	Raccordo Anulare (Marathon)	None	Not listed.	
1960 Rome	Stadio Olimpico	Non-road	65,000	
1960 Rome	Via Appia Antica (Marathon)	None	Not listed.	
1960 Rome	Via Cristoforo Colombo (Marathon)	Cycling (road team time trial)	Not listed.	
1964 Tokyo	Fuchu City (Marathon, 50 km walk)	None	Not listed.	
1964 Tokyo	Karasuyama-machi (Marathon, 50 km walk)	None	Not listed.	
1964 Tokyo	National Stadium	Equestrian (team jumping), Football (final)	71,600	
1964 Tokyo	Sasazuka-machi (Marathon, 50 km walk)	None	Not listed	
1964 Tokyo	Shinjuku (Marathon, 50 km walk)	None	Not listed	
1968 Mexico City	Estadio Olímpico Universitario	Ceremonies (opening/ closing), Equestrian (jumping team)	83,700	
1968 Mexico City	Zócalo (Marathon start)	None	Not listed	
1972 Munich	Olympiastadion	Ceremonies (opening/ closing), Equestrian (jumping team), Football (final), Modern pentathlon (running)	77,000	
1976 Montreal	Montreal Botanical Garden (20 km walk)	Modern pentathlon (running)	Not listed.	
1976 Montreal	Olympic Stadium	Ceremonies (opening/ closing), Equestrian (jumping team final), Football (final)	70,000	
1976 Montreal	Streets of Montreal (Marathon)	None	Not listed.	
1980 Moscow	Central Lenin stadium	Equestrian (jumping individual), Football (final), Opening/closing ceremonies	80,000	
1980 Moscow	Streets of Moscow (Marathon, walks)	None	Not listed.	
1984 Los Angeles	Los Angeles Memorial Coliseum	Ceremonies (opening/ closing)	92,516	
1984 Los Angeles	Santa Monica College (Marathon start)	None	Not listed.	
1984 Los Angeles	Streets of Los Angeles (Marathon, walks)	None	Not listed.	
1984 Los Angeles	Streets of Santa Monica (Marathon)	None	Not listed.	
1988 Seoul	Olympic Stadium	Equestrian (jumping individual final), Football (final)	100,000	
1988 Seoul	Streets of Seoul (Marathon, walks)	None	Not listed.	
1992 Barcelona	Estadi Olímpic de Monjuïc	Ceremonies (opening/closing)	67,007	
1992 Barcelona	Marathon course (Marathon)	None	Not listed.	
1992 Barcelona	Mataró (Marathon start)	None	Not listed.	
1992 Barcelona	Walking course (Walks)	None	Not listed.	
1996 Atlanta	Marathon course (Marathon)	None	800	
1996 Atlanta	Olympic Stadium	Ceremonies (opening/ closing)	85,600	
1996 Atlanta	Walking course (Walks)	Athletics (walks)	800	
2000 Sydney	Marathon course (Marathon)	None	Not listed.	
2000 Sydney	North Sydney (Marathon start)	None	Not listed.	
2000 Sydney	Olympic Stadium	Ceremonies (opening/closing), Football (final)	114,700	
2004 Athens	Marathon (city) (Marathon start)	None	Not listed.	
2004 Athens	Olympic Stadium (All but shot put)	Ceremonies (opening/closing), Football (final)	72,000	
2004 Athens	Panathinaiko Stadium (Marathon finish)	Archery	7,500 (archery); 34,500 (athletics marathon finish)	
2004 Athens	Stadium at Olympia (Shot put)	None	Not listed.	
2008 Beijing	Beijing National Stadium	Football (final), Ceremonies (opening/closing)	91,000	
2012 London	Marathon Course (with Race Walk in The Mall)	Cycling (road start and finish)	Not listed.	
2012 London	Olympic Stadium	Ceremonies (opening/ closing)	80,000	
2016 Rio de Janeiro	Pontal (race walk)	Cycling (time trial)	5,000	
2016 Rio de Janeiro	Estádio Olímpico Nilton Santos	Football (8 group matches)	60,000	
2016 Rio de Janeiro	Sambódromo (marathon)	Archery	72,000	
2020 Tokyo	Japan National Stadium	Ceremonies (opening/closing)	68,000	
2020 Tokyo	Odori Park (marathon, race walk)	None	700	
2024 Paris	Pont d'Iéna (marathon, race walk)	Aquatics (marathon swimming), cycling (road), triathlon	13,000 (3,000 sitting)	
2024 Paris	Stade de France	Ceremonies (closing), rugby sevens	77,083	
2028 Los Angeles	Los Angeles Memorial Coliseum	Ceremonies (opening/closing)	60,000	
2028 Los Angeles	Grand Park (marathon, race walk)	Cycling	5,000	
2032 Brisbane	Brisbane Olympic stadium	Ceremonies (opening/closing)	63,000	
2032 Brisbane	Alexandra Headland (marathon, race walk)	Cycling (road), sailing (kiteboarding)	5,000	

== Gallery of venues ==
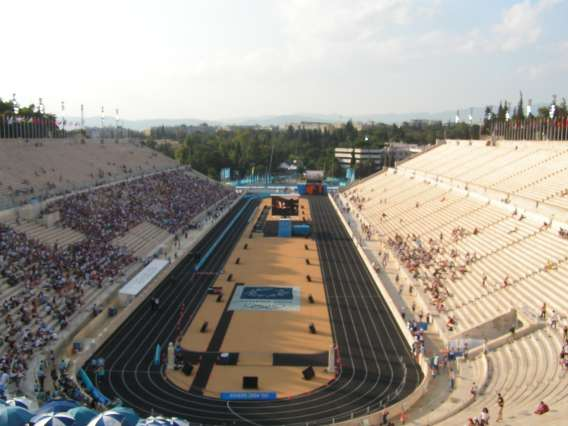
Panathinaiko Stadium hosted athletics at the 1896 Summer Olympics in Athens. In 2004, it was the finish line for the athletics marathon events.

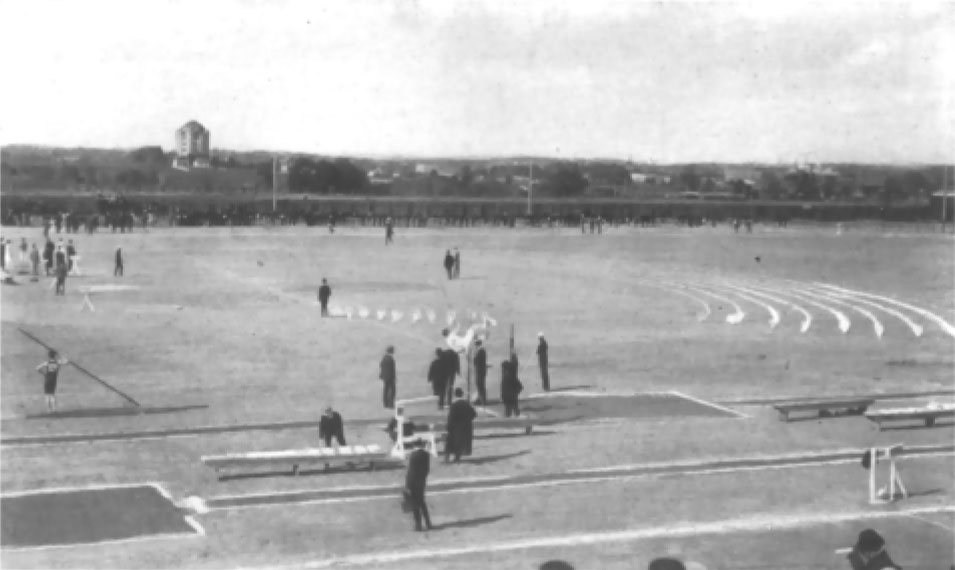
Francis Field hosted athletics at the 1904 Summer Olympics in St. Louis.

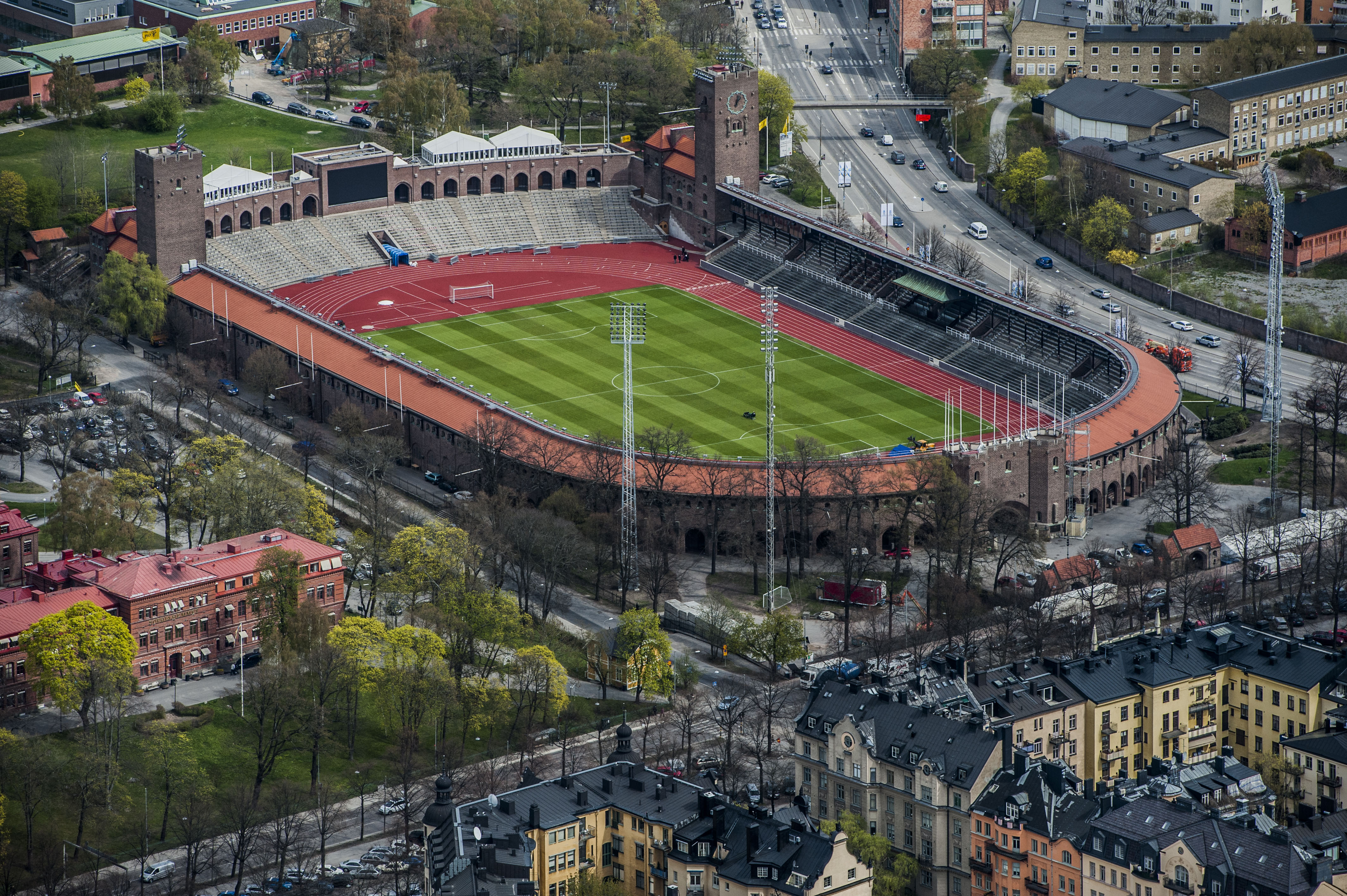
Stockholm Olympic Stadium hosted athletics at the 1912 Summer Olympics.

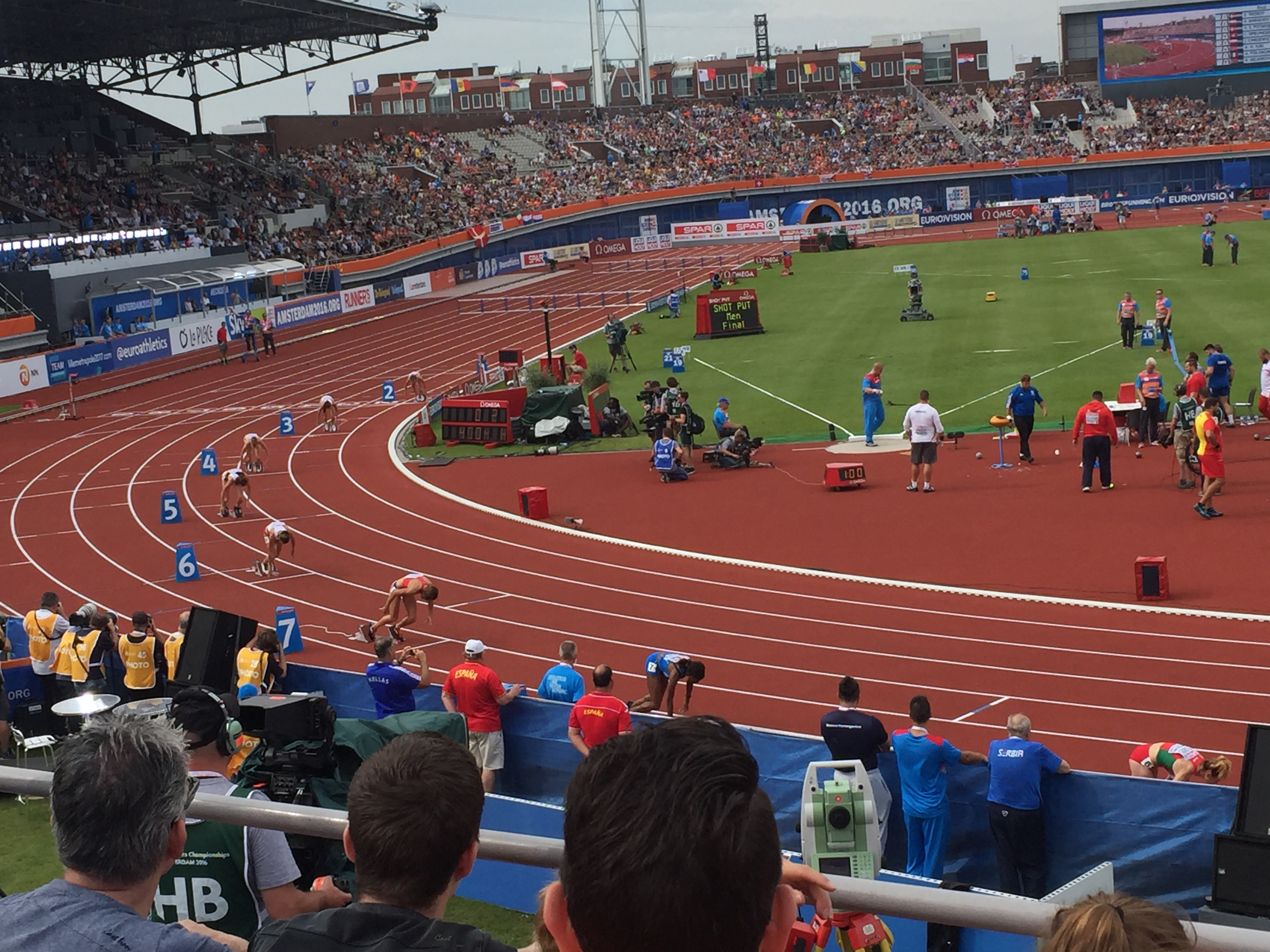
Olympisch Stadion hosted athletics at the 1928 Summer Olympics in Amsterdam.

The Los Angeles Memorial Coliseum hosted athletics at the 1932 and 1984 Summer Olympics. It will host athletics for a third time at the 2028 Summer Olympics.

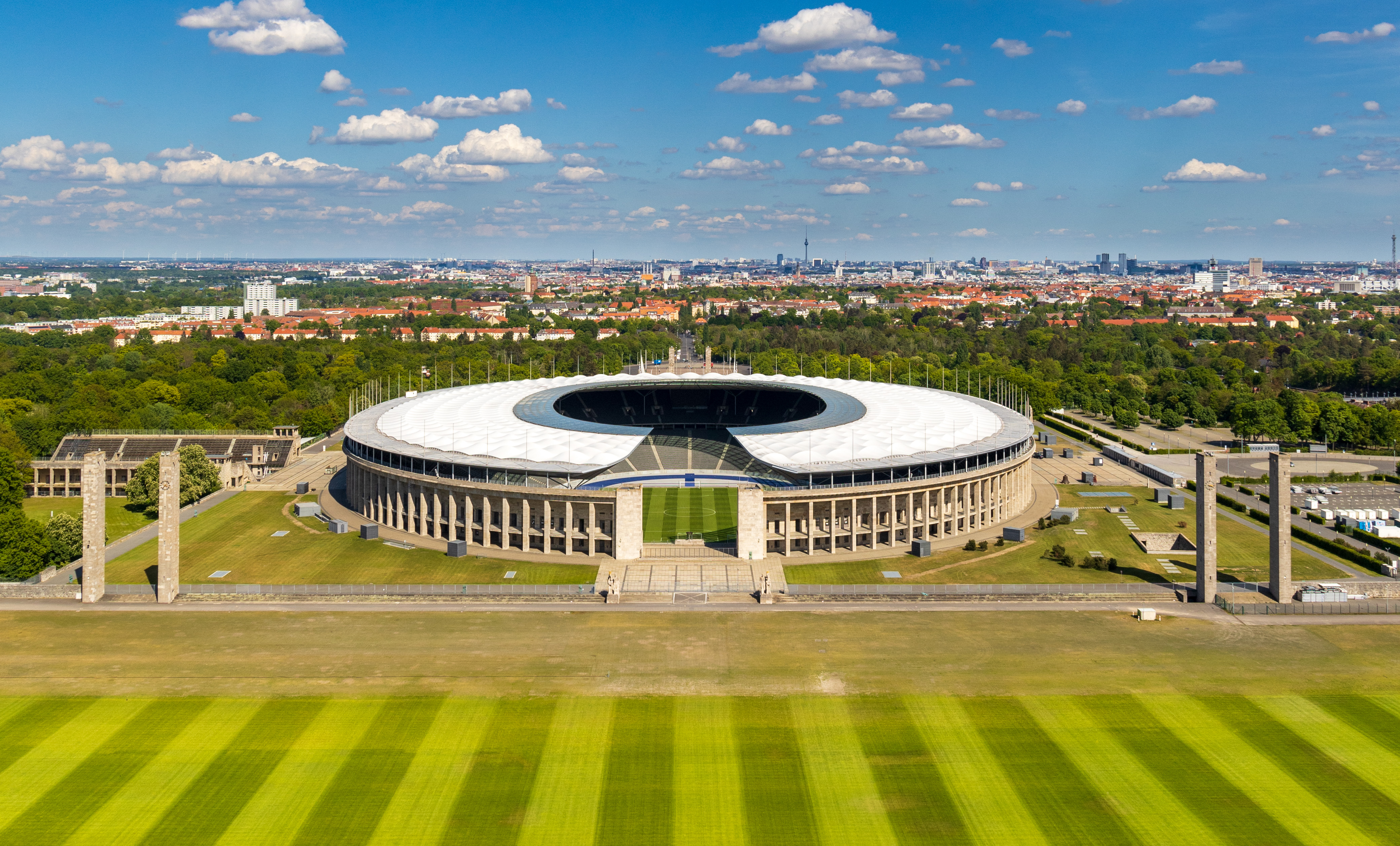
The Olympiastadion hosted athletics at the 1936 Summer Olympics in Berlin.

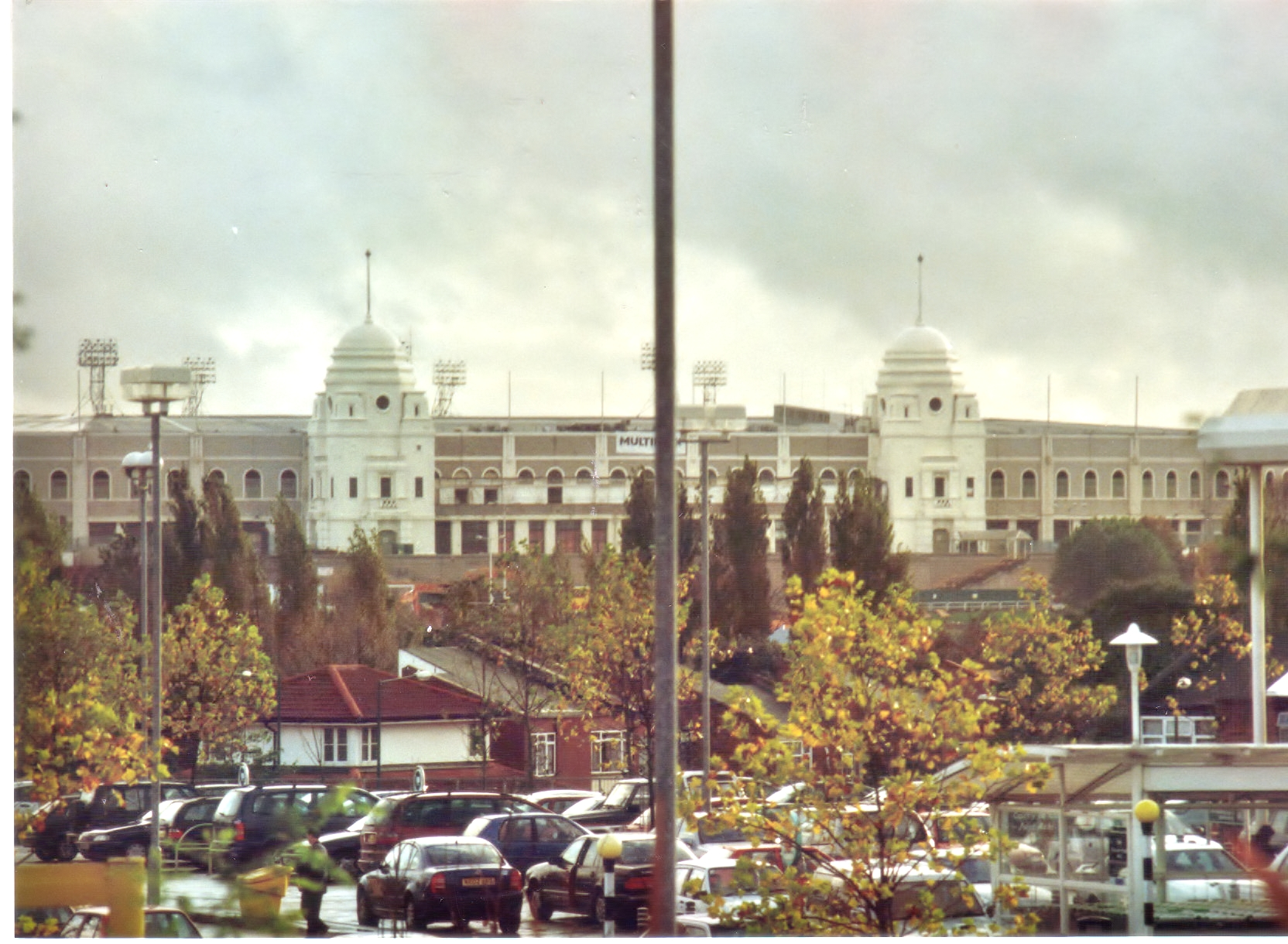
The original Wembley Stadium hosted athletics at the 1948 Summer Olympics in London.

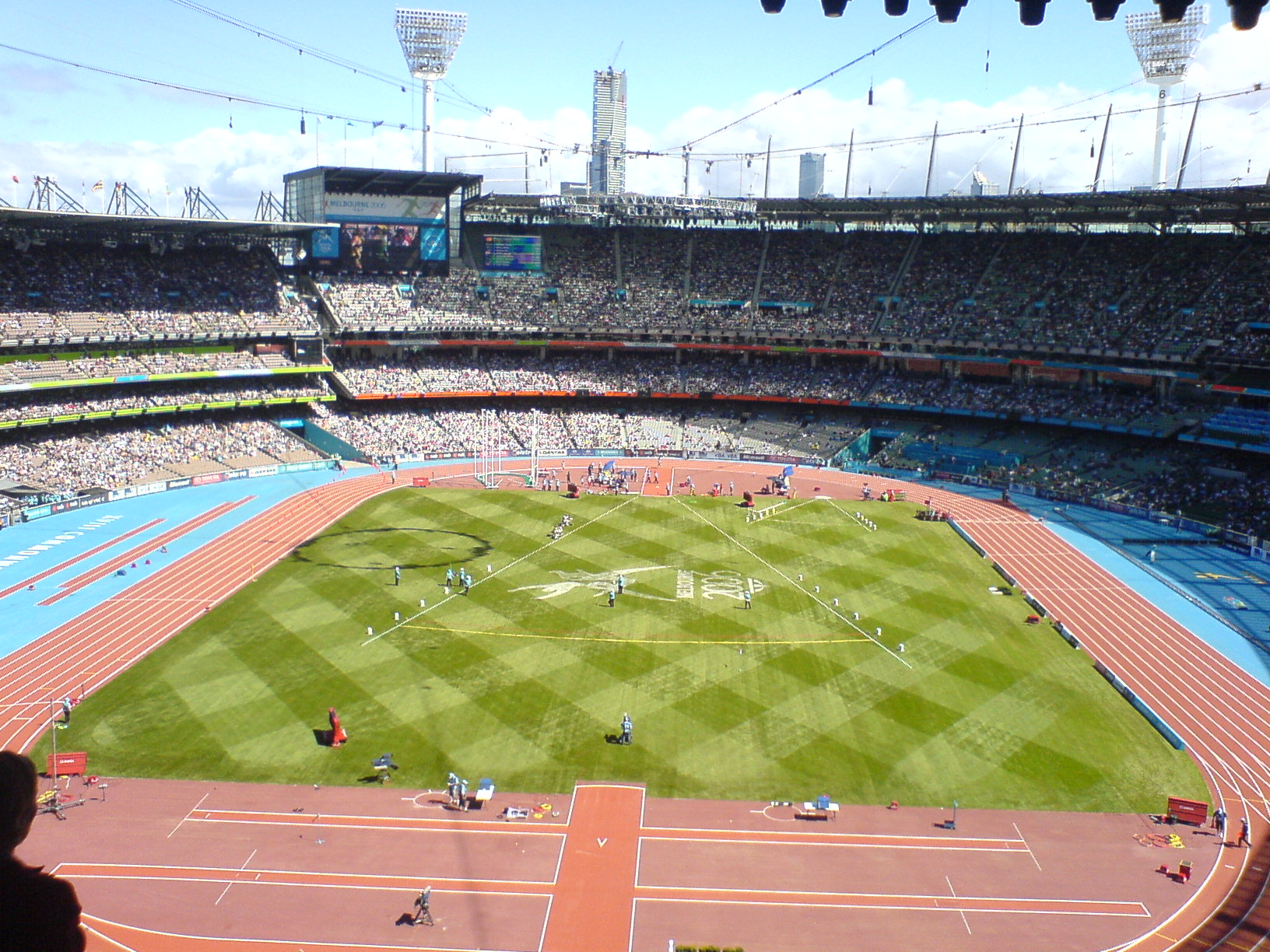
The Melbourne Cricket Ground hosted athletics at the 1956 Summer Olympics.

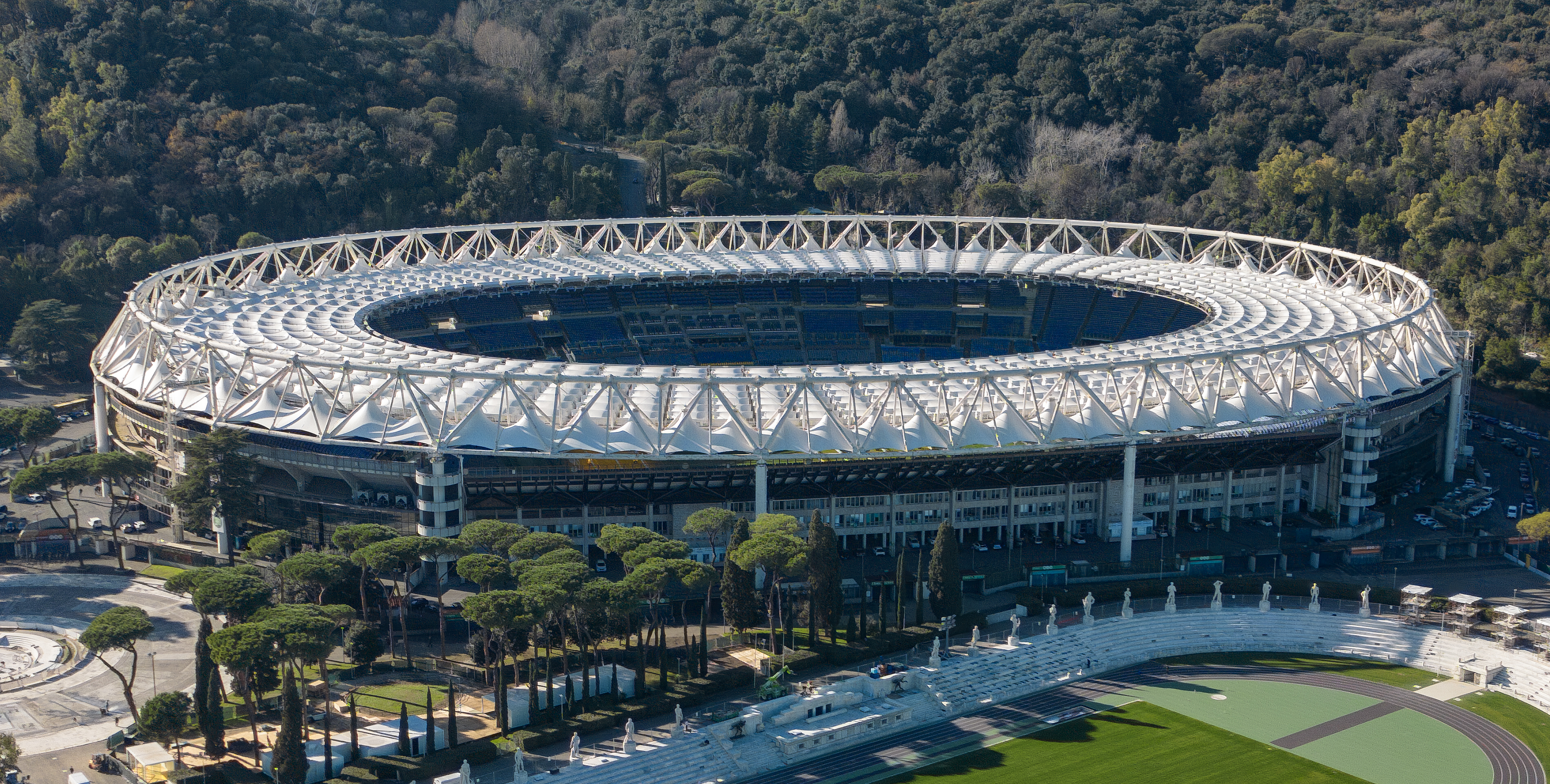
Stadio Olimpico hosted athletics at the 1960 Summer Olympics in Rome.

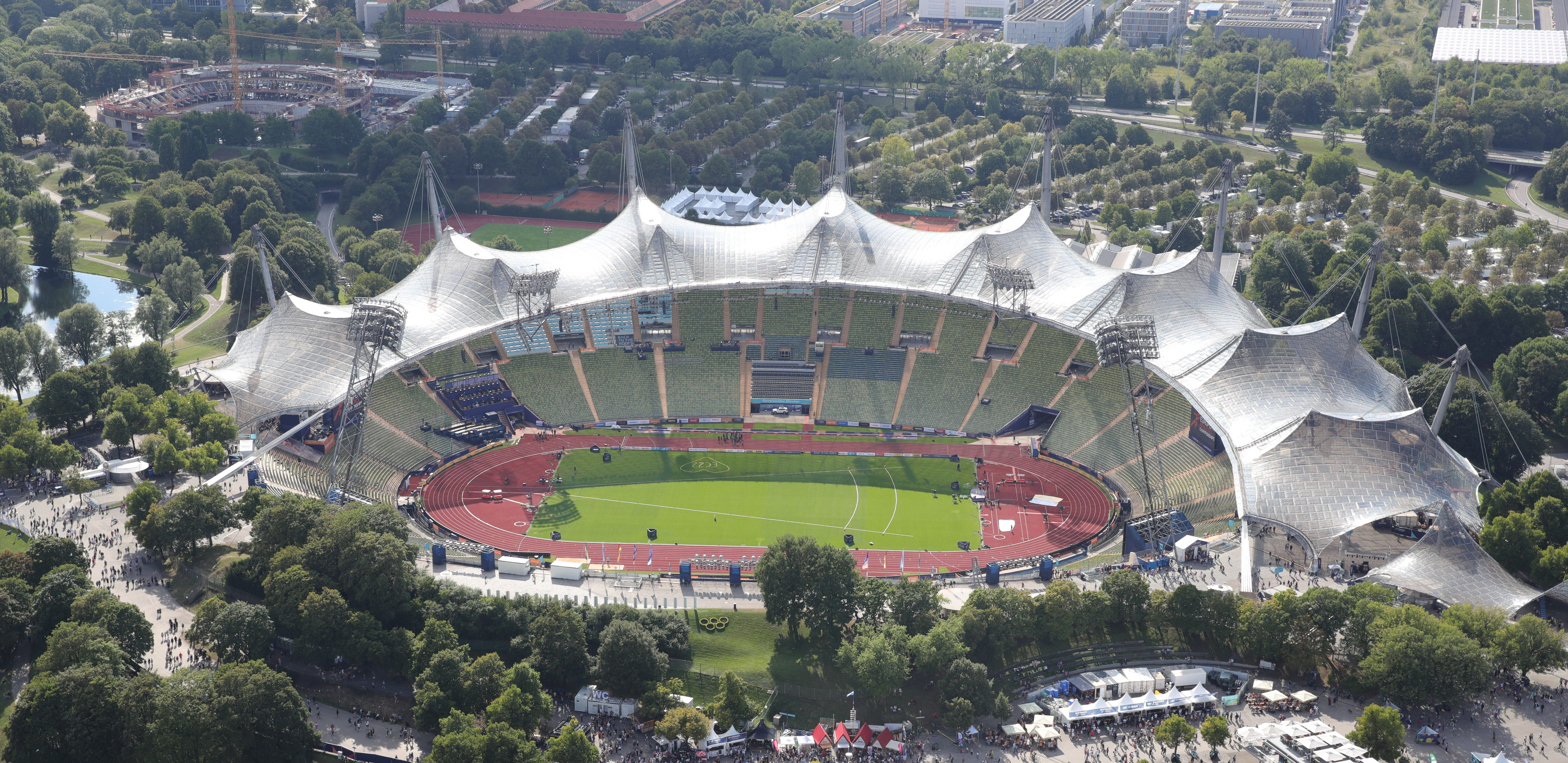
The Olympiastadion hosted athletics at the 1972 Summer Olympics in Munich.

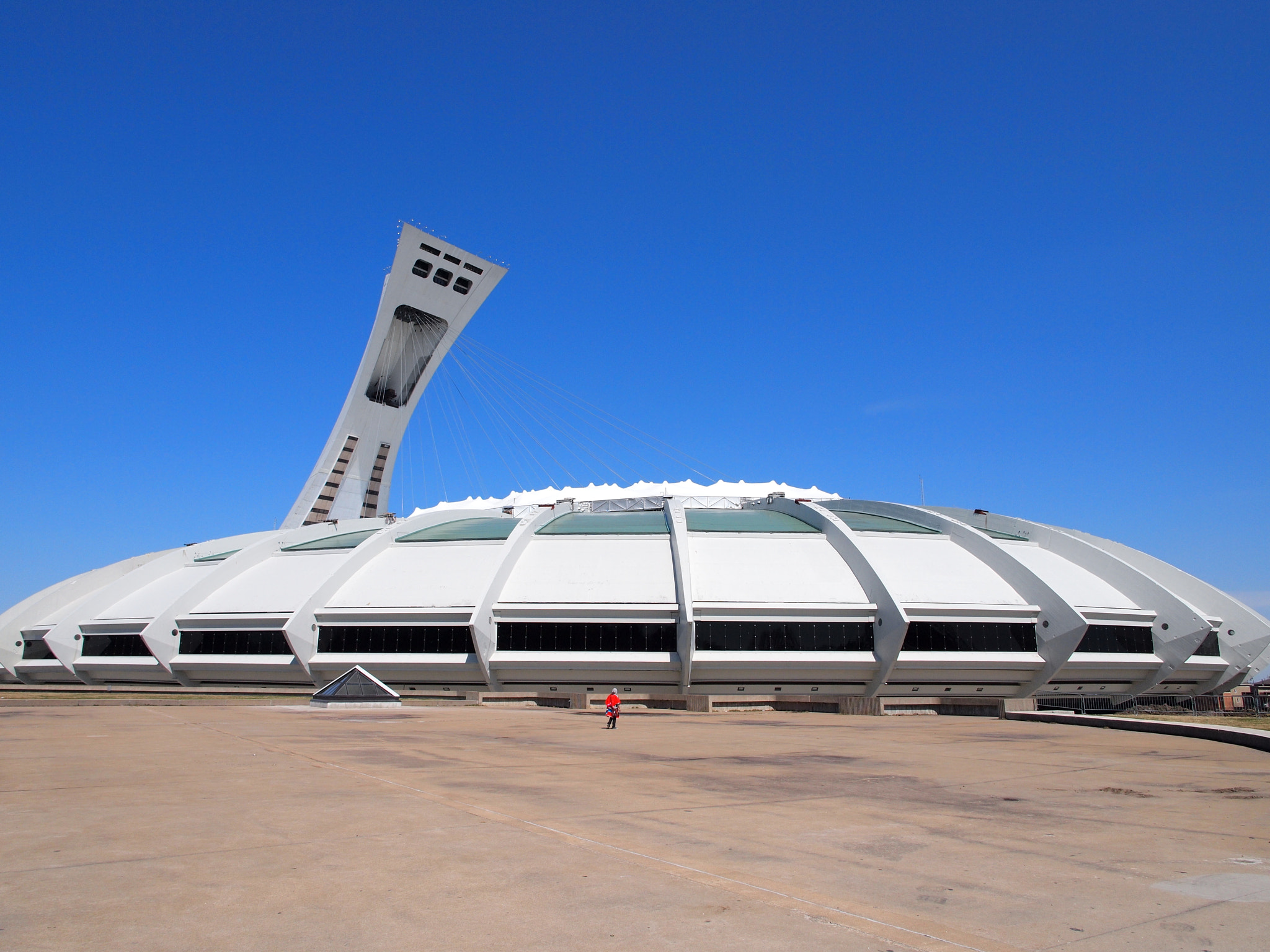
The Stade Olympique hosted athletics at the 1976 Summer Olympics in Montreal.

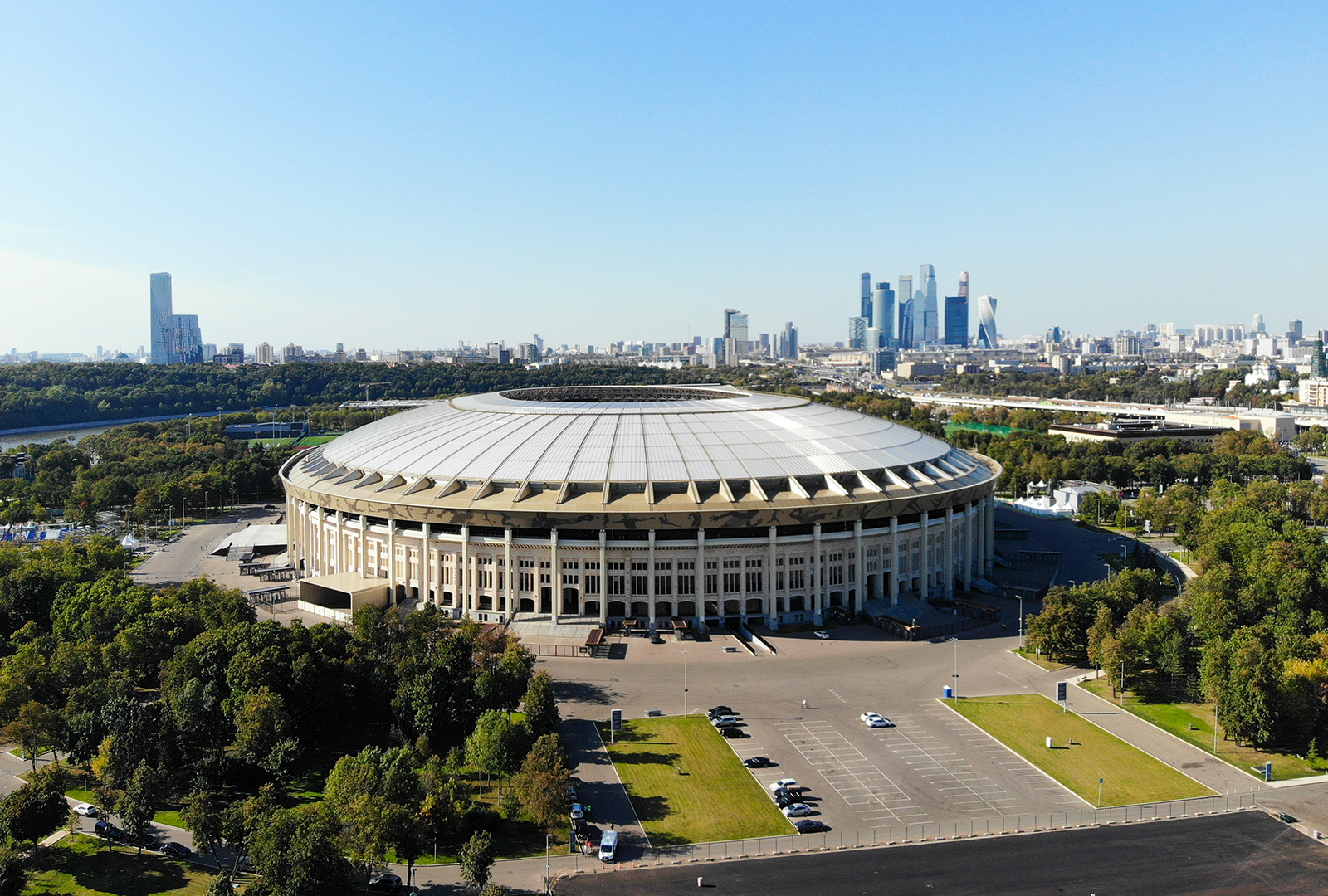
Luzhniki Stadium hosted athletics at the 1980 Summer Olympics in Moscow.

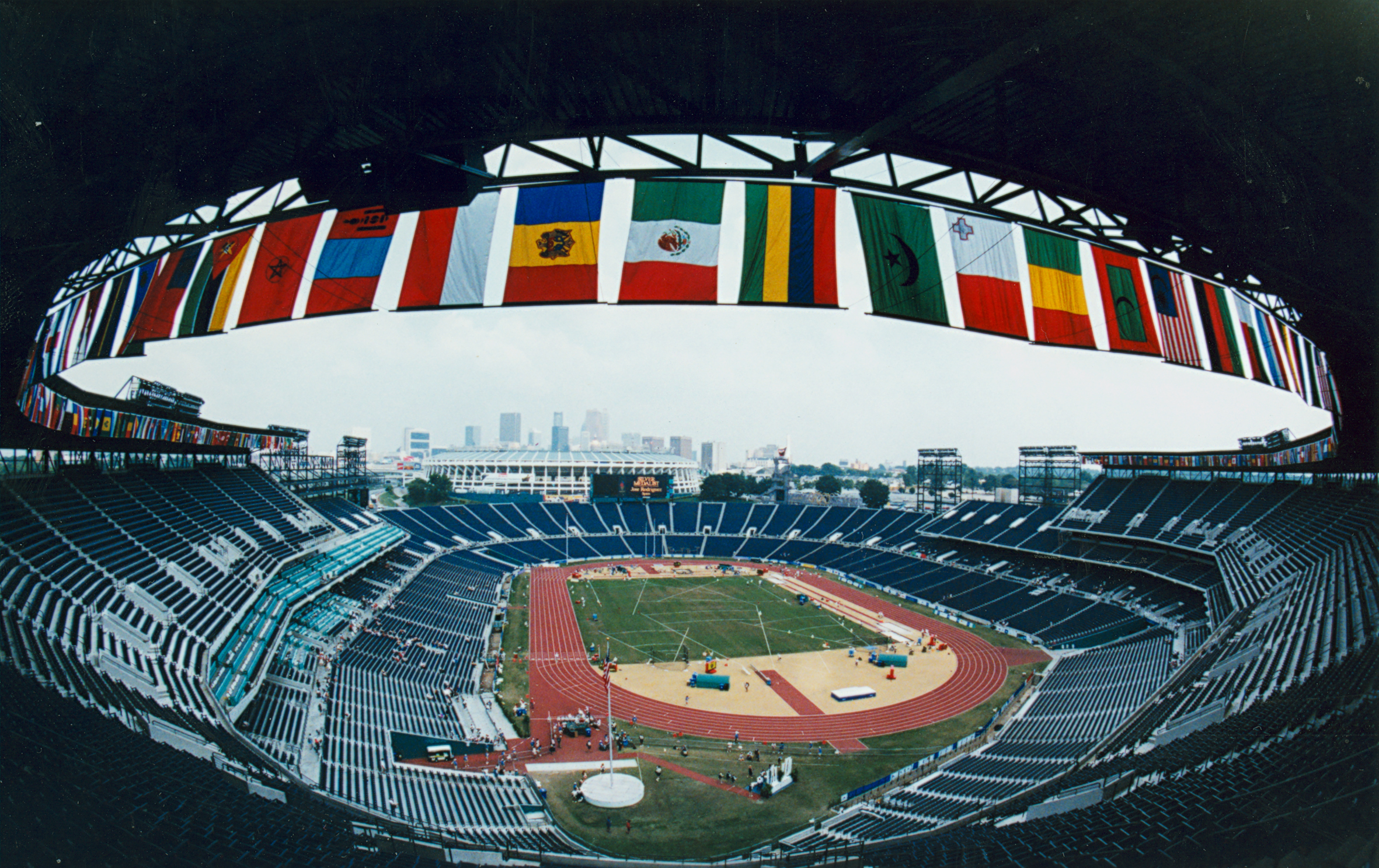
The Centennial Olympic Stadium hosted athletics at the 1996 Summer Olympics in Atlanta.

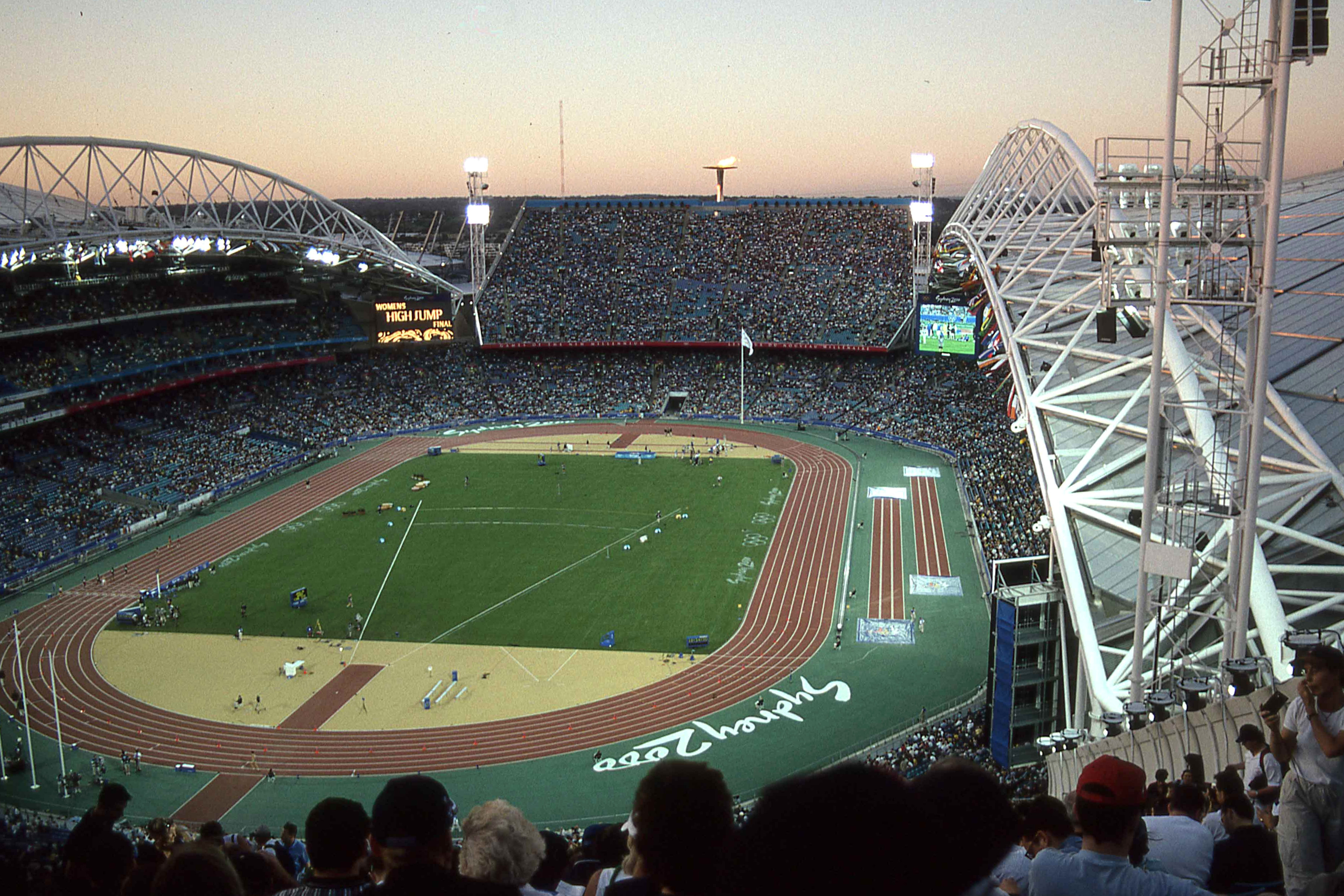
Stadium Australia hosted athletics at the 2000 Summer Olympics in Sydney.

Olympic Stadium hosted athletics at the 2004 Summer Olympics.

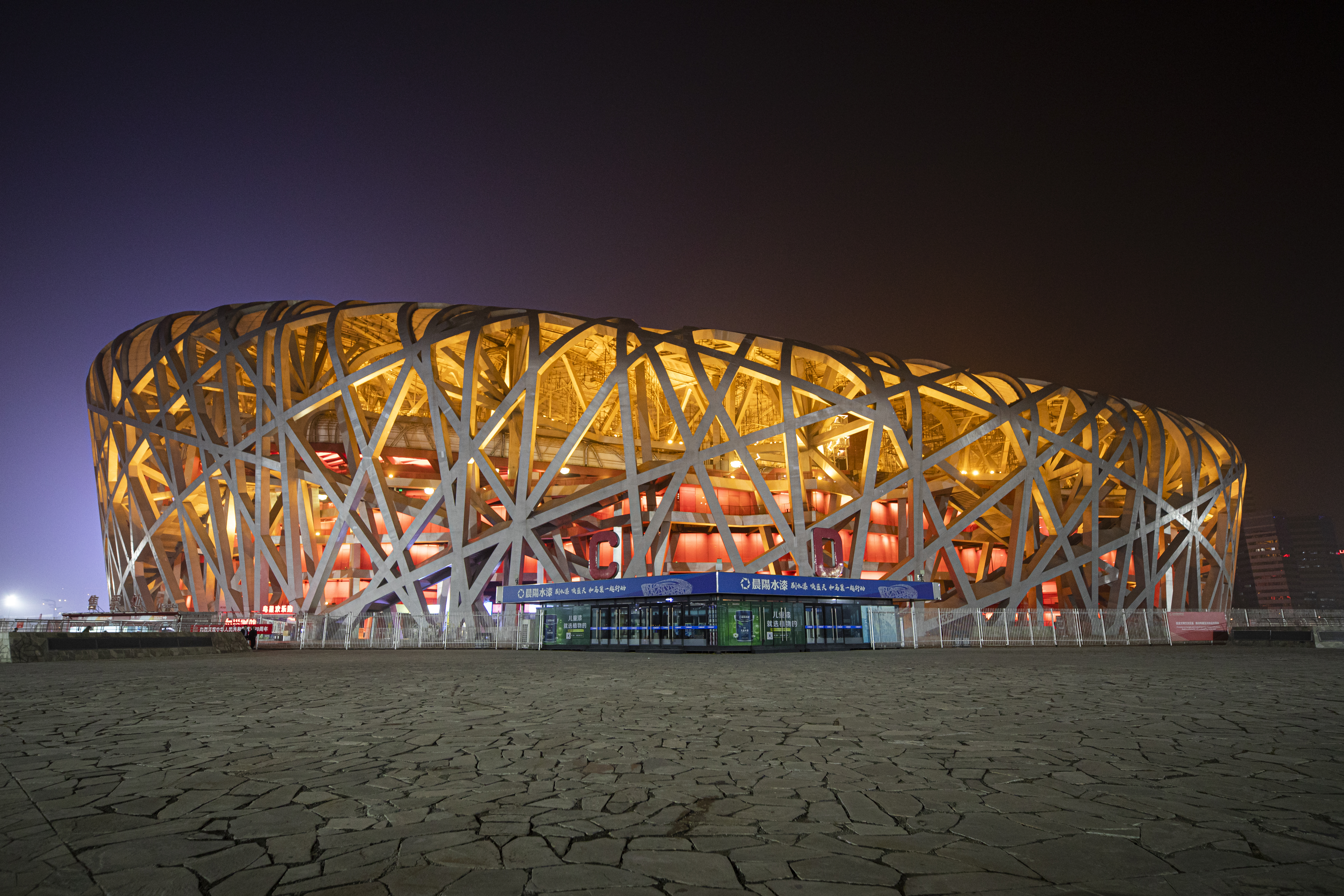
The Beijing National Stadium hosted athletics at the 2008 Summer Olympics.

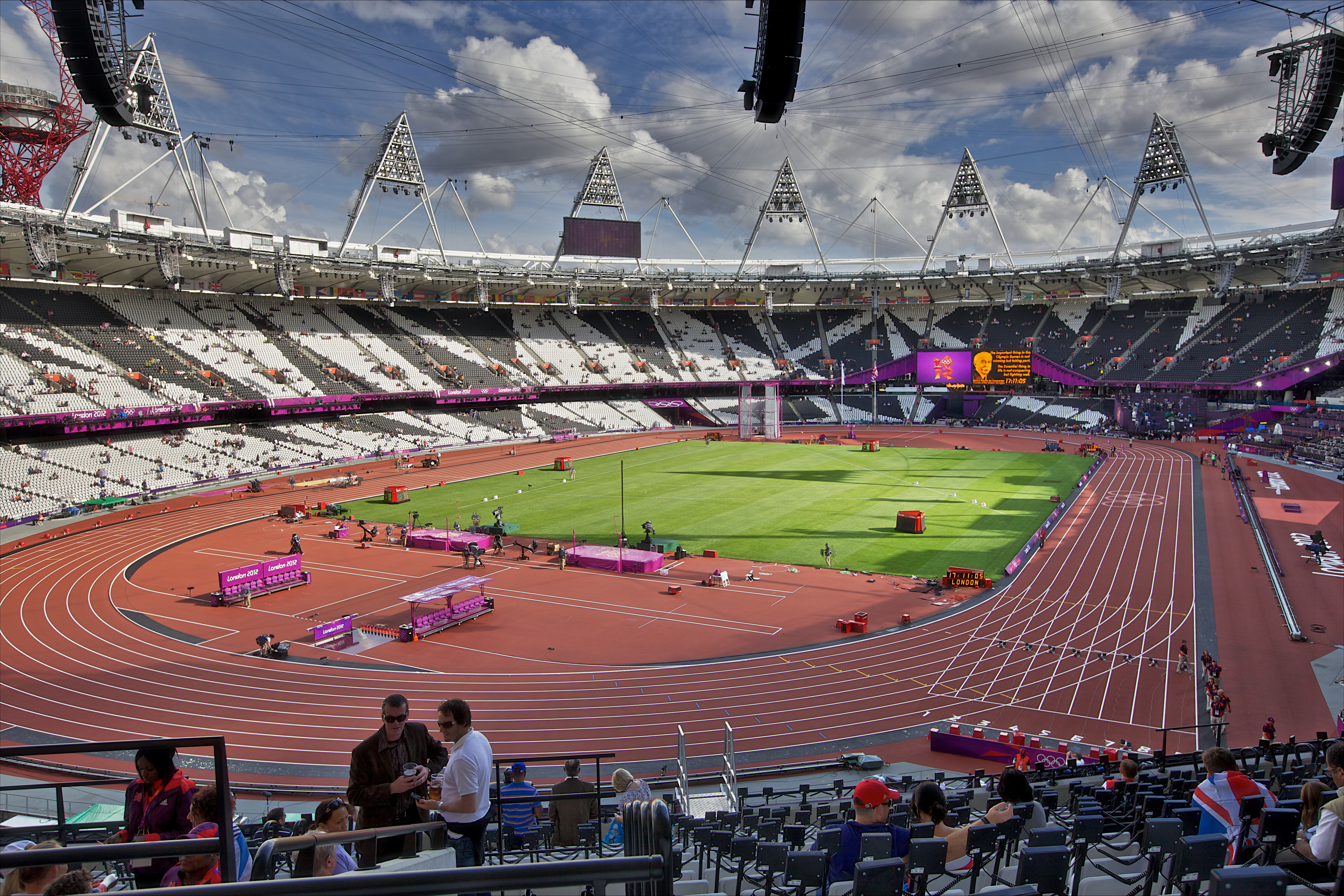
London Stadium hosted athletics at the 2012 Summer Olympics in London.

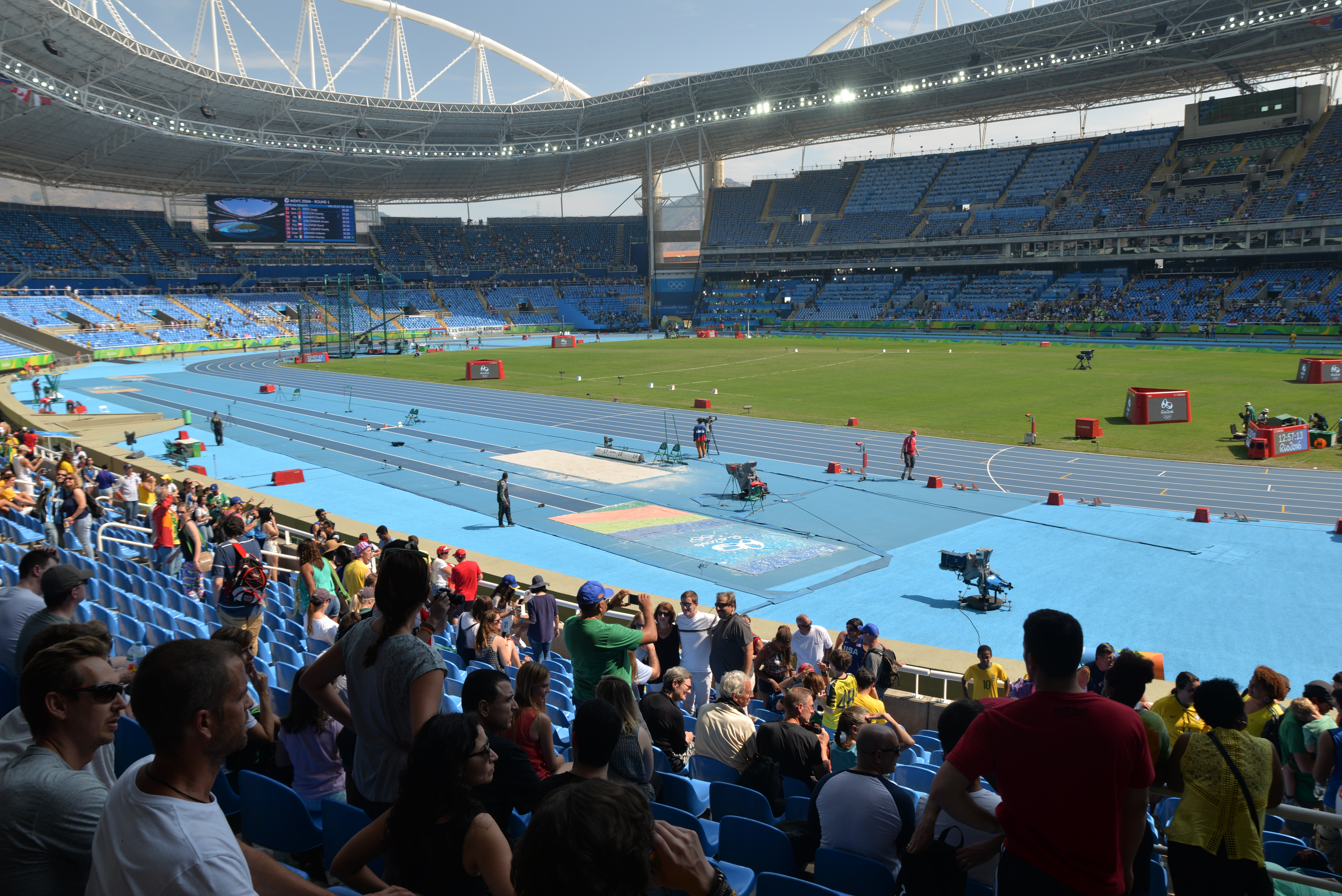
The Estádio Olímpico Nilton Santos hosted athletics at the 2016 Summer Olympics in Rio de Janeiro.

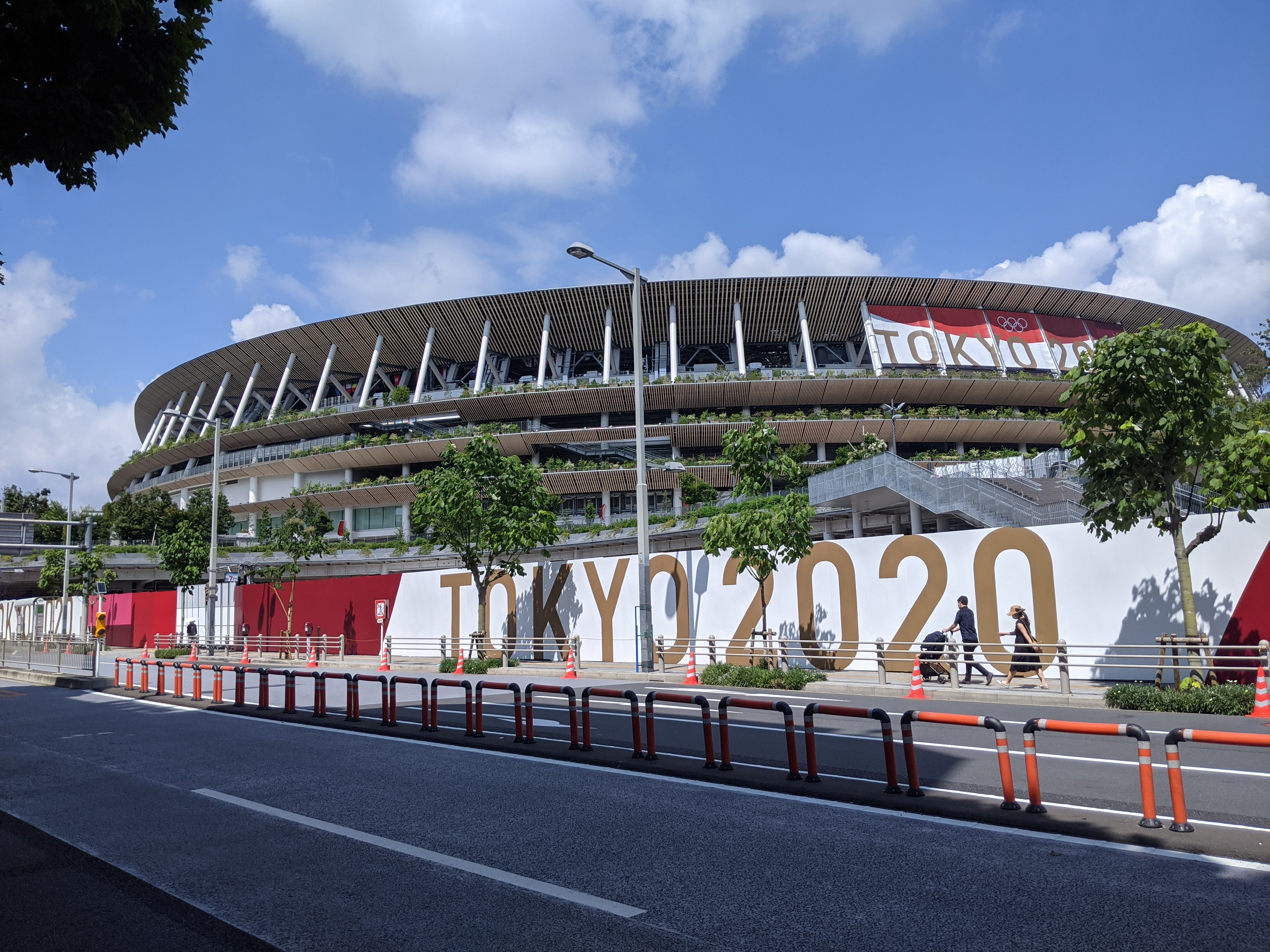
The Japan National Stadium hosted athletics at the 2020 Summer Olympics in Tokyo.

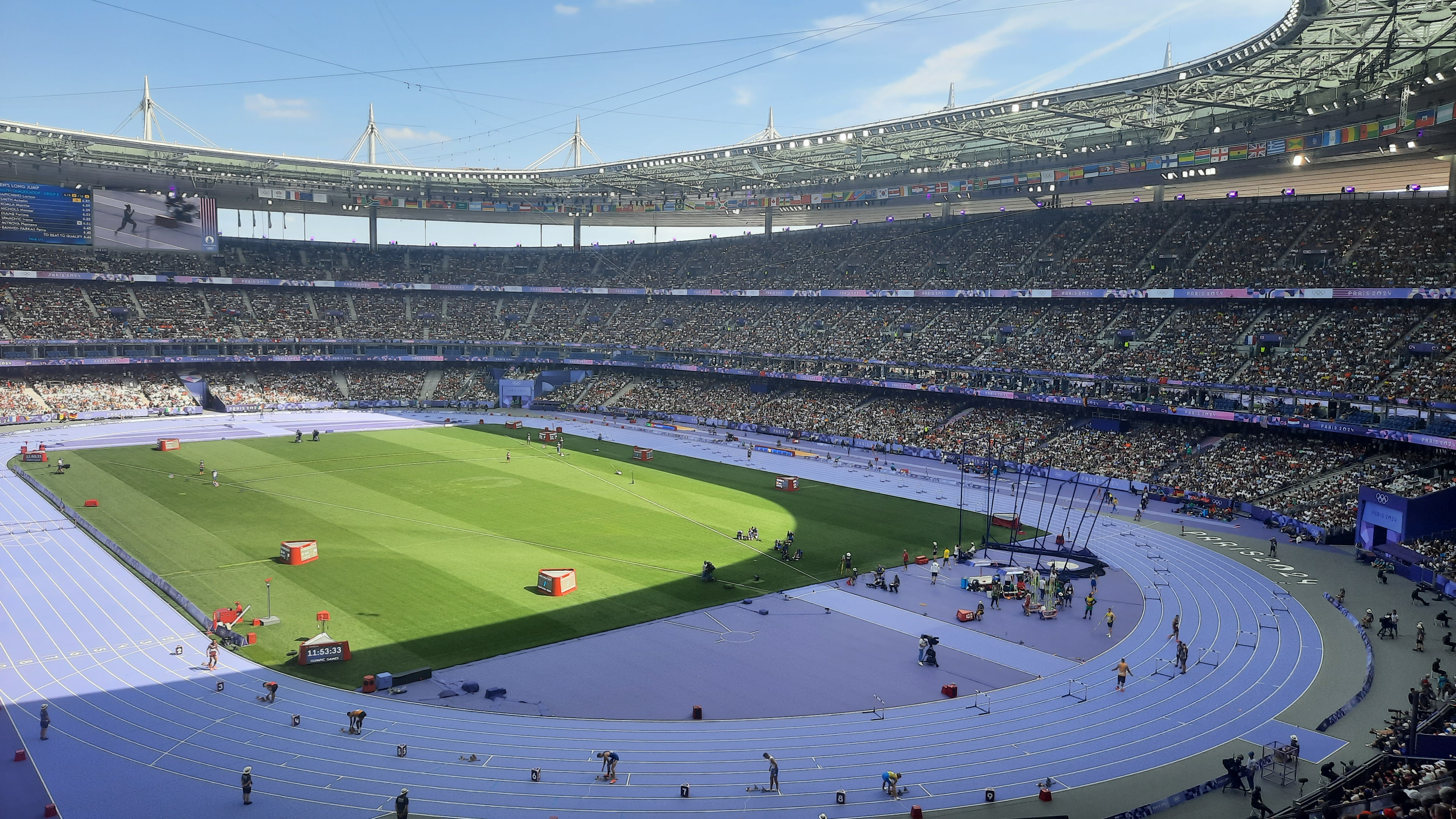
The Stade de France hosted athletics at the 2024 Summer Olympics in Paris.
