= Cycling at the 1904 Summer Olympics – 1/2 mile =

Men's 1/2 mile at the Games of the III Olympiad
- Venue: Francis Field
- Date: August 2
- Competitors: 16 from 1 nation

Medalists
| 1st place, gold medalist(s) | | Marcus Hurley | United States |
| 2nd place, silver medalist(s) | | Teddy Billington | United States |
| 3rd place, bronze medalist(s) | | Burton Downing | United States |

The 1/2 mile was a track cycling event held as part of the cycling programme at the 1904 Summer Olympics. It was the only time this .5 miles (800 m) event was held at the Olympics. 16 American cyclists competed. The names of 2 of the competitors are not known.

== Results ==
=== Heats ===
The top two finishers in each heat advanced to the semifinals. The identities of 2 of the 4 cyclists who placed fourth in each heat are unknown, though Joel N. McCrea and Oscar Schwab are known to have raced and so are the other 2 fourth-place finishers; which heat each raced in is not known.

Heat 1
| 1. | Marcus Hurley (USA) | 1:08.6 | QS |
| 2. | George E. Wiley (USA) | | QS |
| 3. | Arthur F. Andrews (USA) | | |
| 4. | Unknown (USA) | | |
Heat 2
| 1. | Aimé Fritz (USA) | 1:07.0 | QS |
| 2. | Charles Schlee (USA) | | QS |
| 3. | Oscar Goerke (USA) | | |
| 4. | Unknown (USA) | | |
Heat 3
| 1. | Teddy Billington (USA) | 1:18.6 | QS |
| 2. | Henry Wittman (USA) | | QS |
| 3. | Anthony Williamsen (USA) | | |
| 4. | Unknown (USA) | | |
Heat 4
| 1. | Burton Downing (USA) | 1:13.6 | QS |
| 2. | Fred Grinham (USA) | | QS |
| 3. | Leo Larson (USA) | | |
| 4. | Unknown (USA) | | |

=== Semifinals ===
The top two finishers in each semifinal advanced to the final.

Semifinal 1
| 1. | Marcus Hurley (USA) | 1:12.8 | QF |
| 2. | George E. Wiley (USA) | | QF |
| 3-4 | Aimé Fritz (USA) | | |
| 3-4 | Charles Schlee (USA) | | |
Semifinal 2
| 1. | Teddy Billington (USA) | 1:09.0 | QF |
| 2. | Burton Downing (USA) | | QF |
| 3-4 | Fred Grinham (USA) | | |
| 3-4 | Henry Wittman (USA) | | |

=== Final ===
Final
| Gold | Marcus Hurley (USA) | 1:09.0 |
| Silver | Teddy Billington (USA) | |
| Bronze | Burton Downing (USA) | |
| 4. | George E. Wiley (USA) | |

== Sources ==
- Wudarski, Pawel (1999). "Wyniki Igrzysk Olimpijskich" (in Polish). Archived from the original on 16 February 2009.
