= Cycling at the 1904 Summer Olympics – 1/4 mile =

Men's 1/4 mile at the Games of the III Olympiad
- Venue: Francis Field
- Date: August 3
- Competitors: 11 from 2 nations

Medalists
1st place, gold medalist(s)		Marcus Hurley	United States
2nd place, silver medalist(s)		Burton Downing	United States
3rd place, bronze medalist(s)		Teddy Billington	United States

The 1/4 mile was a track cycling event held as part of the cycling programme at the 1904 Summer Olympics. It was the only time this 0.25 miles (400 m) event was held at the Olympics. 11 cyclists competed.

== Results ==
=== Heats ===
The top two finishers in each heat advanced to the semifinals.

Heat 1
1.	Teddy Billington (USA)	36.0	QS
2.	Frank Bizzoni (ITA)		QS
Heat 2
1.	Marcus Hurley (USA)	35.6	QS
2.	Frank Montaldi (USA)		QS
3.	Oscar Schwab (USA)		
Heat 3
1.	Oscar Goerke (USA)	34.8	QS
2.	Arthur F. Andrews (USA)		QS
3.	Fred Grinham (USA)		
Heat 4
1.	Burton Downing (USA)	35.2	QS
2.	Henry Wittmann (USA)		QS
3.	Anthony Williamsen (USA)		

=== Semifinals ===
The top two finishers in each semifinal advanced to the final.

Semifinal 1
1.	Marcus Hurley (USA)	34.8	QF
2.	Teddy Billington (USA)		QF
3-4	Frank Bizzoni (ITA)		
3-4	Frank Montaldi (USA)		
Semifinal 2
1.	Oscar Goerke (USA)	33.4	QF
2.	Burton Downing (USA)		QF
3-4	Arthur F. Andrews (USA)		
3-4	Henry Wittmann (USA)		

=== Final ===
Final
Gold	Marcus Hurley (USA)	31.8
Silver	Burton Downing (USA)	
Bronze	Teddy Billington (USA)	
4.	Oscar Goerke (USA)	

== Sources ==
- Wudarski, Pawel (1999). "Wyniki Igrzysk Olimpijskich" (in Polish). Archived from the original on 16 February 2009.
