= Marcus Hurley =

American cyclist (1883–1941)

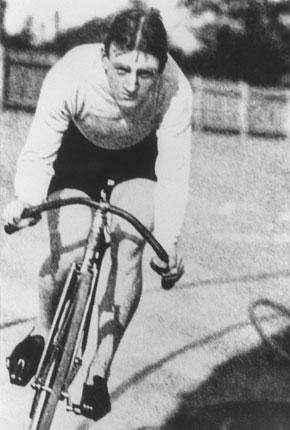
- Hurley in 1904
Medal record
Men's cycling
Representing the United States
Olympic Games
Gold medal – first place	1904 St. Louis	¼ mile
Gold medal – first place	1904 St. Louis	⅓ mile
Gold medal – first place	1904 St. Louis	½ mile
Gold medal – first place	1904 St. Louis	Mile
Bronze medal – third place	1904 St. Louis	2 mile

Marcus Latimer Hurley (December 22, 1883 – March 28, 1941) was an American cyclist who competed in the early twentieth century. He specialized in sprint cycling and won 4 gold medals in Cycling at the 1904 Summer Olympics and a bronze medal in the 2 mile race.

== Biography ==
He was born on December 22, 1883. He was on the first national collegiate basketball championship team in 1908, serving as Columbia University's basketball team's captain. Hurley served in World War I and was decorated. He died on March 28, 1941.

== See also ==
- List of multiple Olympic gold medalists at a single Games
