= George E. Wiley =

American cyclist

George Wiley
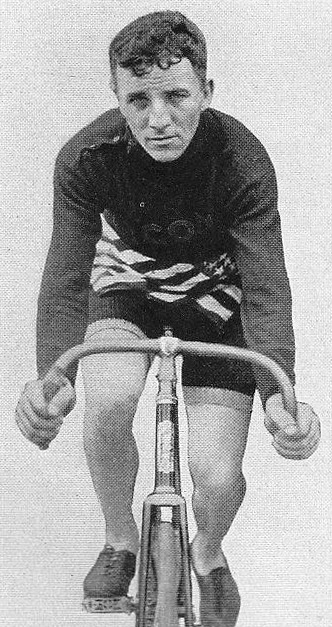
- Wiley in 1912

Personal information
- Full name: George Elsworth Wiley
- Born: May 7, 1881 Little Falls, New York, U.S.
- Died: March 3, 1954 (aged 72) Little Falls, New York, U.S.

Cycling career
- Sport: Cycling
Medal record
Men's road bicycle racing
Representing the United States
Olympic Games
Silver medal – second place	1904 St. Louis	5 miles
Bronze medal – third place	1904 St. Louis	25 miles

George Elsworth Wiley (May 7, 1881 – March 3, 1954) was an American racing cyclist who competed in the early twentieth century.

He competed in Cycling at the 1904 Summer Olympics in Missouri and won the silver in the 5 miles and the bronze in the 25 miles race. In the 1/2 mile event he finished fourth and in the 1 mile competition he was eliminated in the first round.
