= Cycling at the 1904 Summer Olympics =

Cycling at the Games of the III Olympiad
- Venues: Francis Olympic Field
- Date: August 2–5
- Competitors: 18 from 2 nations

At the 1904 Summer Olympics, seven cycling events were contested.

It was the only time distances based on the mile were used to determine the length of events.

== Medal summary ==
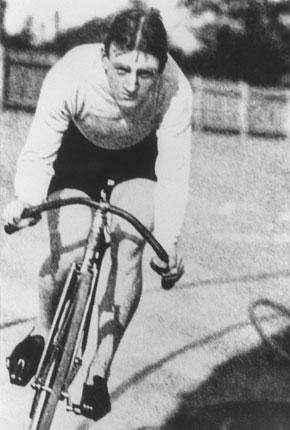
Marcus Hurley

Event	Gold	Silver	Bronze
1/4 mile	Marcus Hurley; United States	Burton Downing; United States	Teddy Billington; United States
1/3 mile	Marcus Hurley; United States	Burton Downing; United States	Teddy Billington; United States
1/2 mile	Marcus Hurley; United States	Teddy Billington; United States	Burton Downing; United States
1 mile	Marcus Hurley; United States	Burton Downing; United States	Teddy Billington; United States
2 miles	Burton Downing; United States	Oscar Goerke; United States	Marcus Hurley; United States
5 miles	Charles Schlee; United States	George E. Wiley; United States	Arthur F. Andrews; United States
25 miles	Burton Downing; United States	Arthur F. Andrews; United States	George E. Wiley; United States

== Participating nations ==
1 Italian and 17 American cyclists competed at the 1904 Summer Olympics.

- United States (17)
- Italy (1)

== Medal table ==
Rank	Nation	Gold	Silver	Bronze	Total
1	United States	7	7	7	21
Totals (1 entries)		7	7	7	21

== Non-medal events ==
The cycling programme at the 1904 Summer Olympics included a number of events that were not recognized as Olympic medal events. These included novice and handicap races for amateurs, as well as races for professional cyclists. Next two these 16 events, there were also two one-mile motorcycle exhibitions held. One conducted by A. N. Jordan and the other by Eugene Holloway.

Games	First	Second	Third
1 mile (novice)	Aimé Fritz (USA)	Frank Bizzoni (ITA)	Harry Wittmann (USA)
½ mile (handicap)	Aimé Fritz (USA)	Harry Wittmann (USA)	Teddy Billington (USA)
1 mile (handicap)	Oscar Goerke (USA)	Harry Wittmann (USA)	Fred Grinham (USA)
5 miles (handicap)	Oscar Goerke (USA)	Charles Schlee (USA)	George Wiley (USA)
⅓ mile (professionals)	William Fenn (USA)	Frank Kramer (USA)	Menus Bedell (USA)
⅓ mile (professionals, consolation)	Oliver Dorlon (USA)	George Collett (USA)	Floyd McFarland (USA)
½ mile (professionals)	Frank Kramer (USA)	William Fenn (USA)	John Bedell (USA)
⅔ mile (professionals)	Frank Kramer (USA)	William Fenn (USA)	Floyd Krebs (USA)
1 mile (professionals)	William Fenn (USA)	James Bowler (USA)	Frank Cadwell (USA)
1 mile (professionals, consolation #1)	James Bowler (USA)	George Collett (USA)	Joseph Fogler (USA)
1 mile (professionals, consolation #2)	Frank Cadwell (USA)	Menus Bedell (USA)	George Collett (USA)
Australian team pursuit (professionals)	United States; Oliver Dorlon; Jimmy Moran; Jacob Jacobson; Floyd Krebs	United States / Australia; James Bowler; Floyd McFarland; George Collett; Fred Scheps	
½ mile (handicap, professionals)	Oliver Dorlon (USA)	John Bedell (USA)	Eddie Root (USA)
1 mile (handicap, professionals)	Floyd Krebs (USA)	Frank Cadwell (USA)	John Bedell (USA)
1 mile (handicap, professionals)	John Bedell (USA)	Eddie Root (USA)	Oliver Dorlon (USA)
2 miles (handicap, professionals)	Eddie Root (USA)	John Bedell (USA)	Menus Bedell (USA)
