= Italy at the 1904 Summer Olympics =

- IOC code: ITA
- NOC: Italian National Olympic Committee
- Website: www.coni.it (in Italian)

in St. Louis
- Competitors: 1 (man) in 1 sport
- Medals: Gold 0 Silver 0 Bronze 0 Total 0

Summer Olympics appearances (overview)
- 1896; 1900; 1904; 1908; 1912; 1920; 1924; 1928; 1932; 1936; 1948; 1952; 1956; 1960; 1964; 1968; 1972; 1976; 1980; 1984; 1988; 1992; 1996; 2000; 2004; 2008; 2012; 2016; 2020; 2024

Other related appearances
- 1906 Intercalated Games

Italy took part in the 1904 Olympic Games with only one athlete, cyclist Frank Bizzoni, an Italian who had settled in the United States in November 1903 and who became an American citizen in 1917, during the First World War. However, the IOC considers him to have competed for the United States team in its official reports, written at a time when the identity and nationality of the participants were not verified. According to those official reports by the IOC, Italy did not participate in the St. Louis Olympic Games. Despite this, Bizzoni from Lodi took part in the cycling race, and he then became an American citizen later in 1917.

== Notes ==
- Elio Trifari, What a surprise: Italy present at all the Games, in Gazzetta dello Sport, 28 November 2008. Retrieved 21 January 2014.
- Italy at the 1904 Games, on sports-reference.com. URL accessed January 21, 2014 (archived from the original url on November 7, 2017).
