= Burton Downing =

American cyclist

Personal information
- Born: February 5, 1885
- Died: January 1, 1929 (aged 43) Red Bank, New Jersey, U.S.

Cycling career
- Sport: Cycling
- Discipline: Racing
- Role: Rider
- Rider type: All-rounder
Medal record
Men's track cycling
Representing the United States
Olympic Games
| Gold medal – first place | 1904 St. Louis | 25 mile |
| Gold medal – first place | 1904 St. Louis | 2 mile |
| Silver medal – second place | 1904 St. Louis | ¼ mile |
| Silver medal – second place | 1904 St. Louis | ⅓ mile |
| Silver medal – second place | 1904 St. Louis | 1 mile |
| Bronze medal – third place | 1904 St. Louis | ½ mile |

Burton Cecil Downing (February 5, 1885 – January 1, 1929) was an American racing cyclist who competed in the early twentieth century. An all round cycling talent, he competed in cycling at the 1904 Summer Olympics and won two gold medals in the 25 miles and the two miles, three silver medals in the 1/4 mile, 1/3 mile and one mile races and a bronze medal in the 1/2 mile race.

In later years Downing served as president of the George B. Spearin, Inc. construction company. While serving in this role he contracted pneumonia, which developed into meningitis. He died in Red Bank, New Jersey.

== See also ==
- List of multiple Olympic medalists at a single Games
