= Aimé Fritz =

American cyclist

Aimé Fritz (April 23, 1884 – January 28, 1950) was an American cyclist. He competed in the men's half mile event at the 1904 Summer Olympics.
