= Venues of the 1968 Summer Olympics =

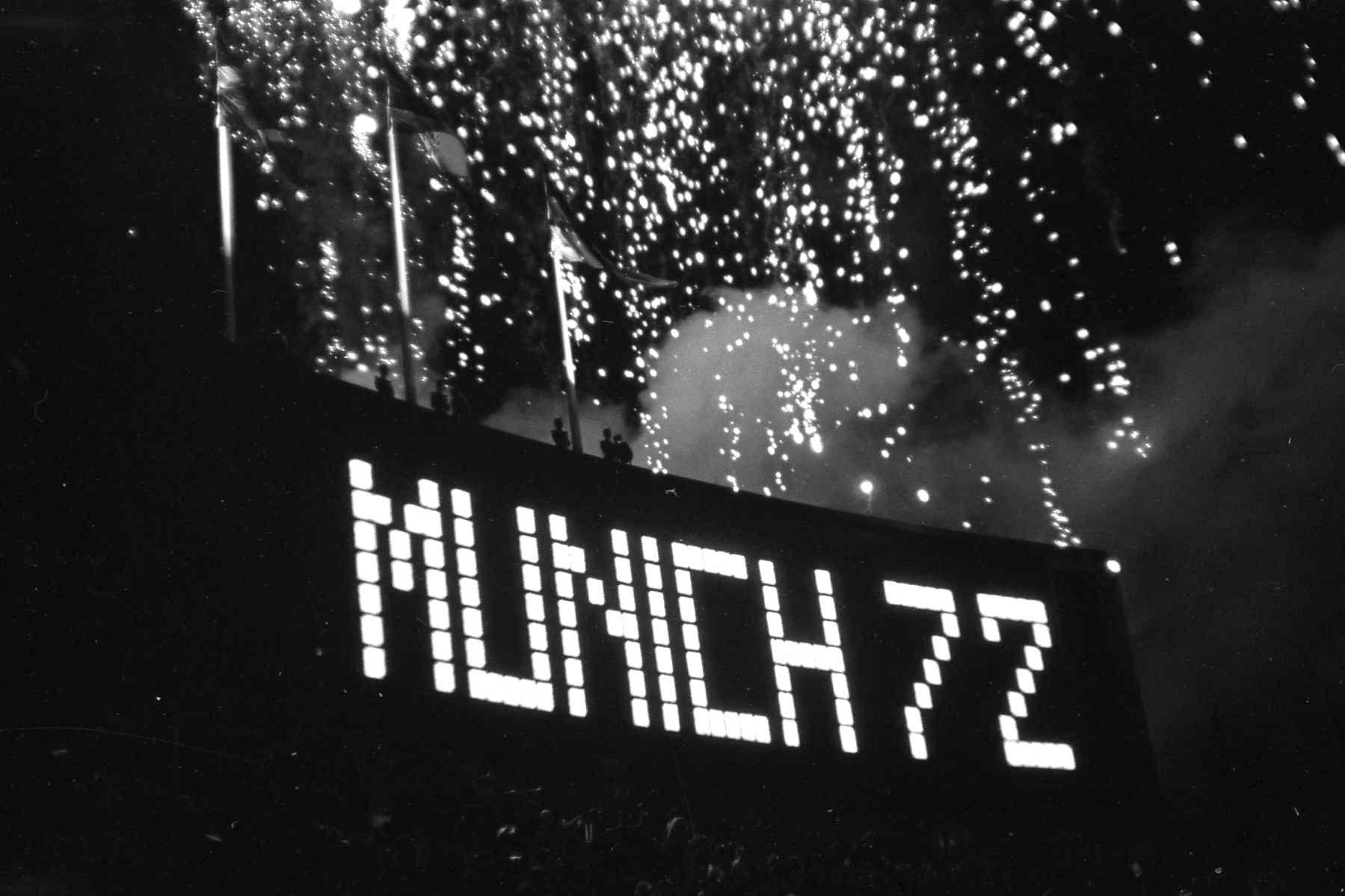
Closing ceremonies at the Estadio Olímpico Universitario in Mexico City

For the 1968 Summer Olympics, a total of twenty-five sports venues were used. Most of the venues were constructed after Mexico City was awarded the 1968 Games. Mexican efforts in determining wind measurement led to sixteen world records in athletics at the University Olympic Stadium. All four of the football venues used for these games would also be used for both of the occurrences that Mexico hosted the FIFA World Cup, in 1970 and 1986.

== Venues ==
Venue	Sports	Capacity	Ref.
Agustín Melgar Olympic Velodrome	Cycling (track)	3,000	
Arena México	Boxing	16,236	
Avándaro Golf Club	Equestrian (eventing)	Not listed.	
Campo Marte	Equestrian (dressage, jumping individual)	7,885 (jumping); 4,990 (dressage)	
Campo Militar 1	Modern pentathlon (riding, running)	Not listed.	
Club de Yates de Acapulco	Sailing	Not listed.	
Estadio Azteca	Football (final)	104,000	
Estadio Cuauhtémoc (Puebla)	Football preliminaries	35,563	
Estadio Jalisco (Guadalajara)	Football preliminaries	31,891	
Estadio Nou Camp (León)	Football preliminaries	23,609	
Estadio Olímpico Universitario	Athletics (includes 20 km and 50 km walks), Ceremonies (opening/ closing), Equestrian (jumping team)	83,700	
Fernando Montes de Oca Fencing Hall	Fencing, Modern pentathlon (fencing)	3,000	
Francisco Márquez Olympic Pool	Diving, Modern pentathlon (swimming), Swimming, Water polo	15,000	
Arena Insurgentes	Wrestling	3,386	
Insurgentes Theater	Weightlifting	1,100	
Juan de la Barrera Olympic Gymnasium	Volleyball	5,242	
Juan Escutia Sports Palace	Basketball, Volleyball	22,370	
Municipal Stadium	Field hockey	7,360	
National Auditorium	Gymnastics	12,450	
Arena Revolución	Volleyball	1,500	
Satellite Circuit	Cycling (road)	Not listed	
University City Swimming Pool	Water polo	4,993	
Vicente Suárez Shooting Range	Modern pentathlon (shooting), Shooting	Not listed.	
Virgilio Uribe Rowing and Canoeing Course	Canoeing, Rowing	17,600	
Zócalo	Athletics (marathon start)	Not listed	

== Before the Olympics ==
Mexico City hosted the Pan American Games in 1955. The city submitted its bid for the 1968 Summer Games to the International Olympic Committee (IOC) in December 1962 and was awarded the games ten months later at the IOC meeting in Baden-Baden, West Germany (Germany since October 1990). Critical path method was used with the help of computers to guide through 88 separate projects related to the 1968 Games. The Olympic Stadium was constructed in 1952 for the 1955 Pan American Games. Most of the venues were constructed from the late 1950s to September 1968.

== During the Olympics ==
Wind measurement at the Olympic Stadium along with the 2,245 m (7,365 ft) altitude were factors in the number of world records set there. The International Association of Athletics Federations (then International Amateur Athletic Federation (IAAF)) has rules to where the maximum allowed wind speed is 2.0 m/s (4.5 mph). World records were set in the men's 100 m, men's 200 m, men's 400 m, men's 800 m, men's 110 m hurdles, men's 400 m hurdles, men's 4 x 100 m relay, men's 4 x 400 m relay, men's long jump, men's triple jump, women's 100 m, women's 200 m, women's 800 m, women's 80 m hurdles, women's 4 x 100 m relay, and the women's long jump. Mexico's methods of wind measurement had readings of the women's 200 m was exactly 2.0 m/s. This same recording of exactly 2.0 m/s was registered in the men's long jump when American Bob Beamon made his famous 8.90 m (29 ft 2 in) jump. It was also the same exact wind reading during the men's triple jump when Brazil's Nelson Prudencio and Viktor Saneyev of the Soviet Union set their world record jumps.

== After the Olympics ==
All four of the football venues would act as stadia for the FIFA World Cup when it came to Mexico in 1970. Aztec Stadium would host the final between Brazil and Italy.

The canoeing and rowing course would host the ICF Canoe Sprint World Championships in 1974 and 1994.

When the Pan American Games returned to Mexico City in 1975, Aztec Stadium served as the ceremonies venue.

In 1986, the FIFA World Cup returned to Mexico and the four football stadiums used for the 1968 Games and 1970 WC were used again as stadia along with the Olympic Stadium. Aztec Stadium became the first (and as of the 2018 FIFA World Cup, only) venue to host the FIFA World Cup final twice when it hosted the final between Argentina and West Germany.

Jalisco Stadium in Guadalajara served as a football venue for the 2011 Pan American Games.

In 2026 the Aztec stadium would be used again making the only stadium to host sports events.
