= Venues of the 2020 Summer Olympics and Paralympics =

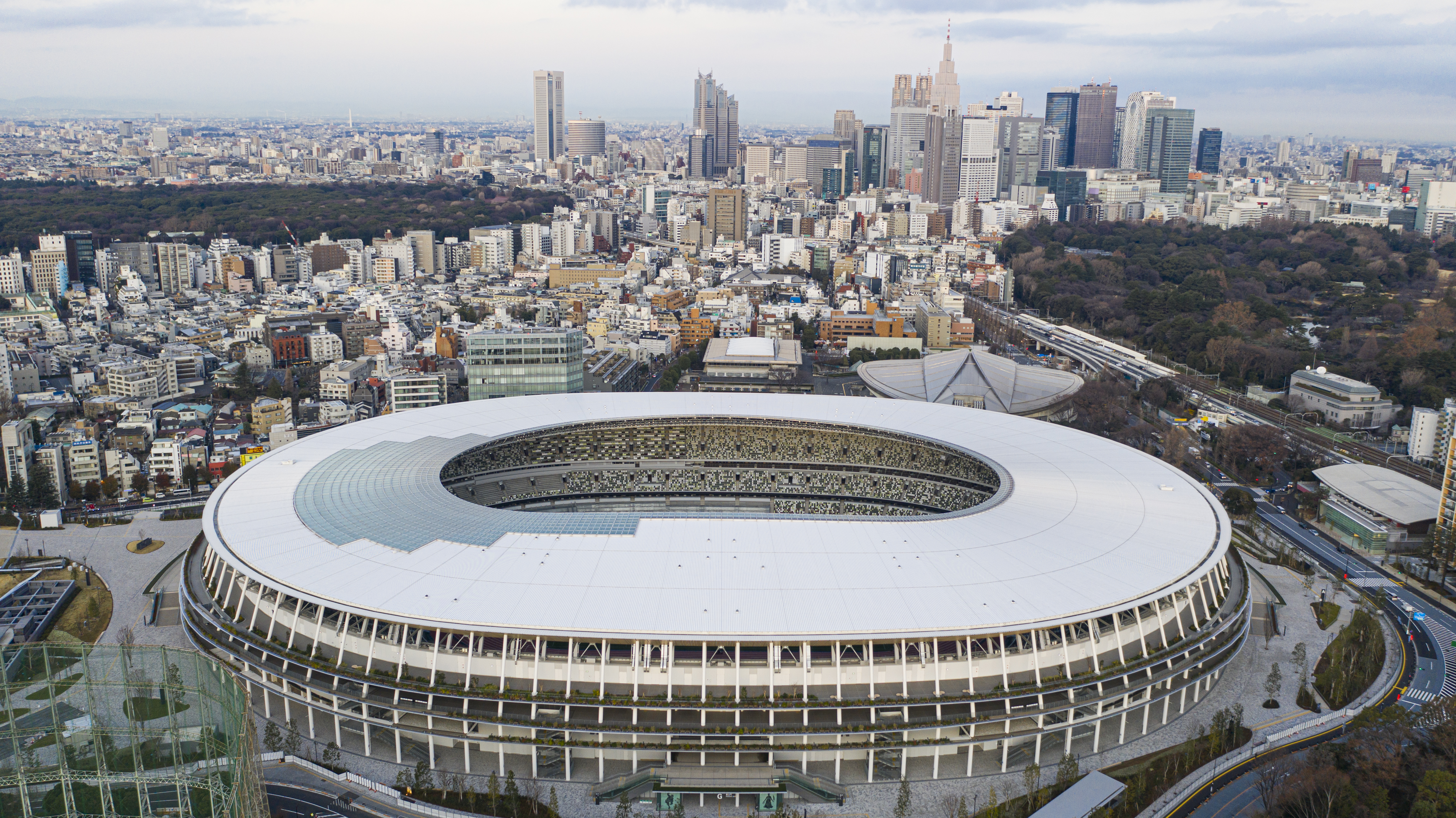
The Japan National Stadium in Tokyo, hosted the Ceremonies and Athletics.

The 2020 Summer Olympics, officially known as the "Games of the XXXII Olympiad", was an international multi-sport event held in Tokyo, Japan, from 23 July to 8 August 2021. Originally scheduled to take place from 24 July to 9 August 2020, it was postponed in March 2020 as a result of the COVID-19 pandemic, and was held largely behind closed doors with no spectators permitted under the state of emergency. (Note: Overseas spectators were first banned in March 2021, then followed by residents of Japan in July of that year to avoid any risk of a superspreading event.) Despite being rescheduled for 2021, the event retained the Tokyo 2020 name for marketing and branding purposes.

The 2020 Summer Paralympics followed two weeks later between 25 August and 5 September 2021.

== Venues and infrastructure ==
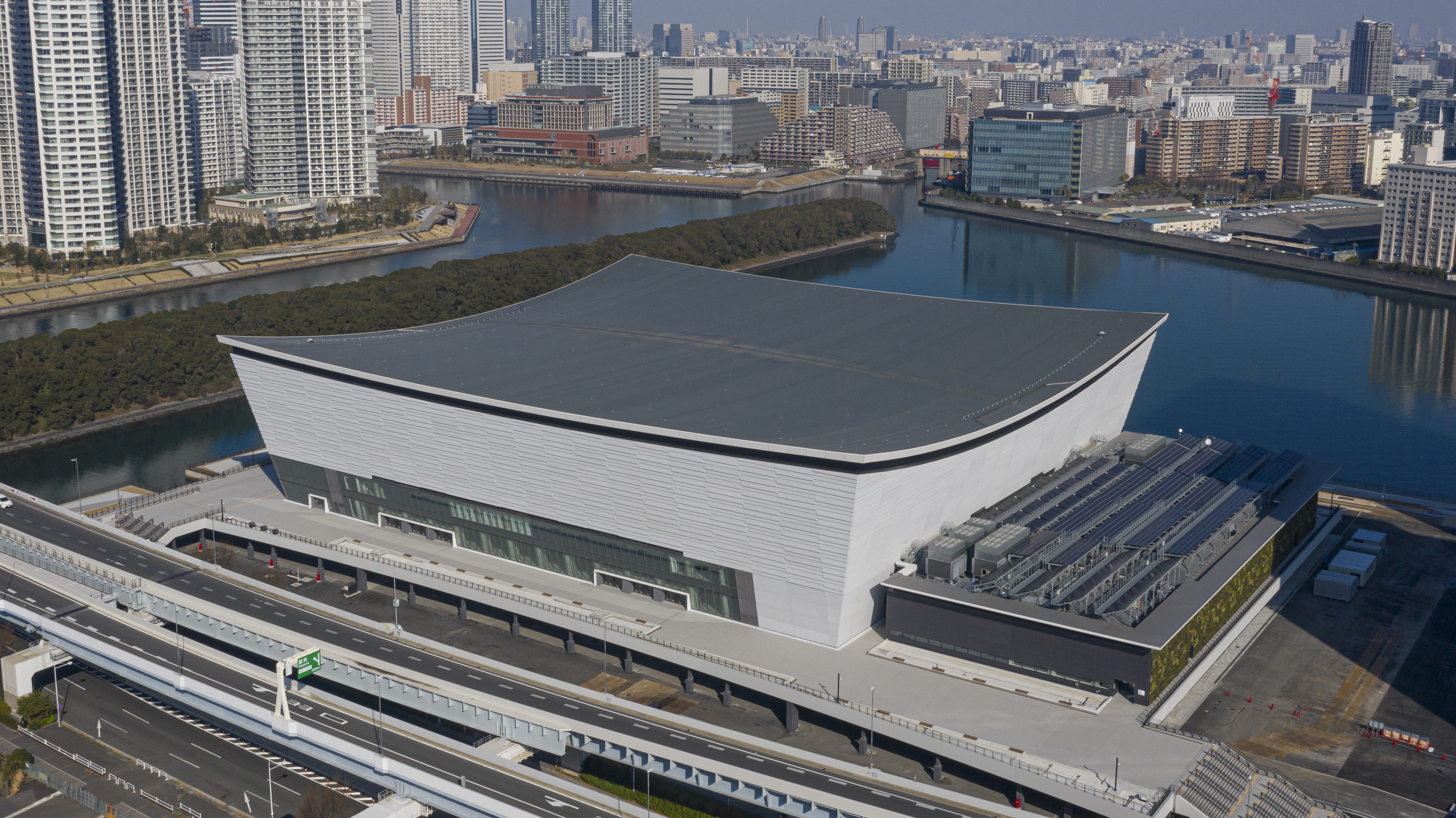
Ariake Arena

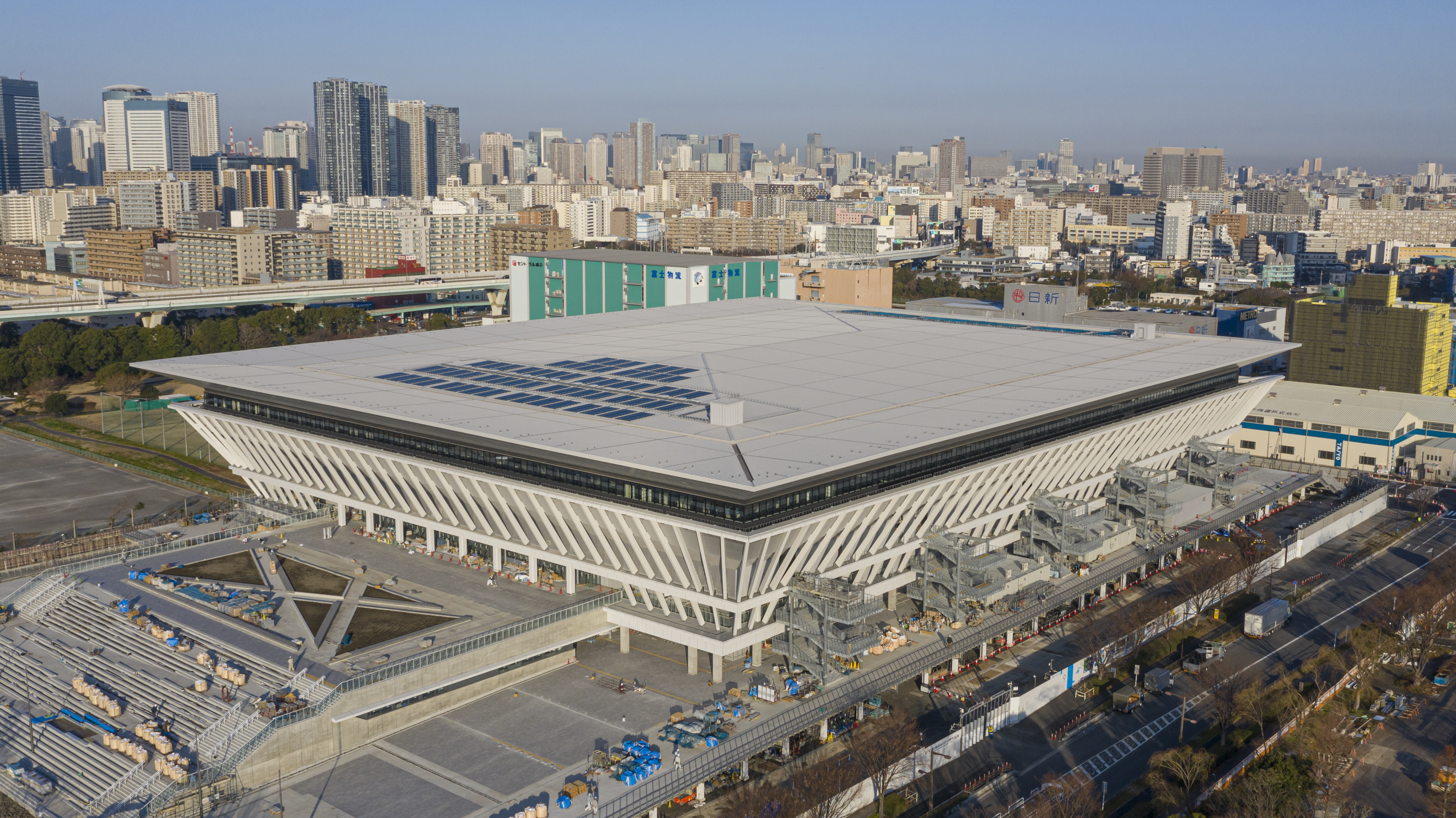
Aquatics Centre

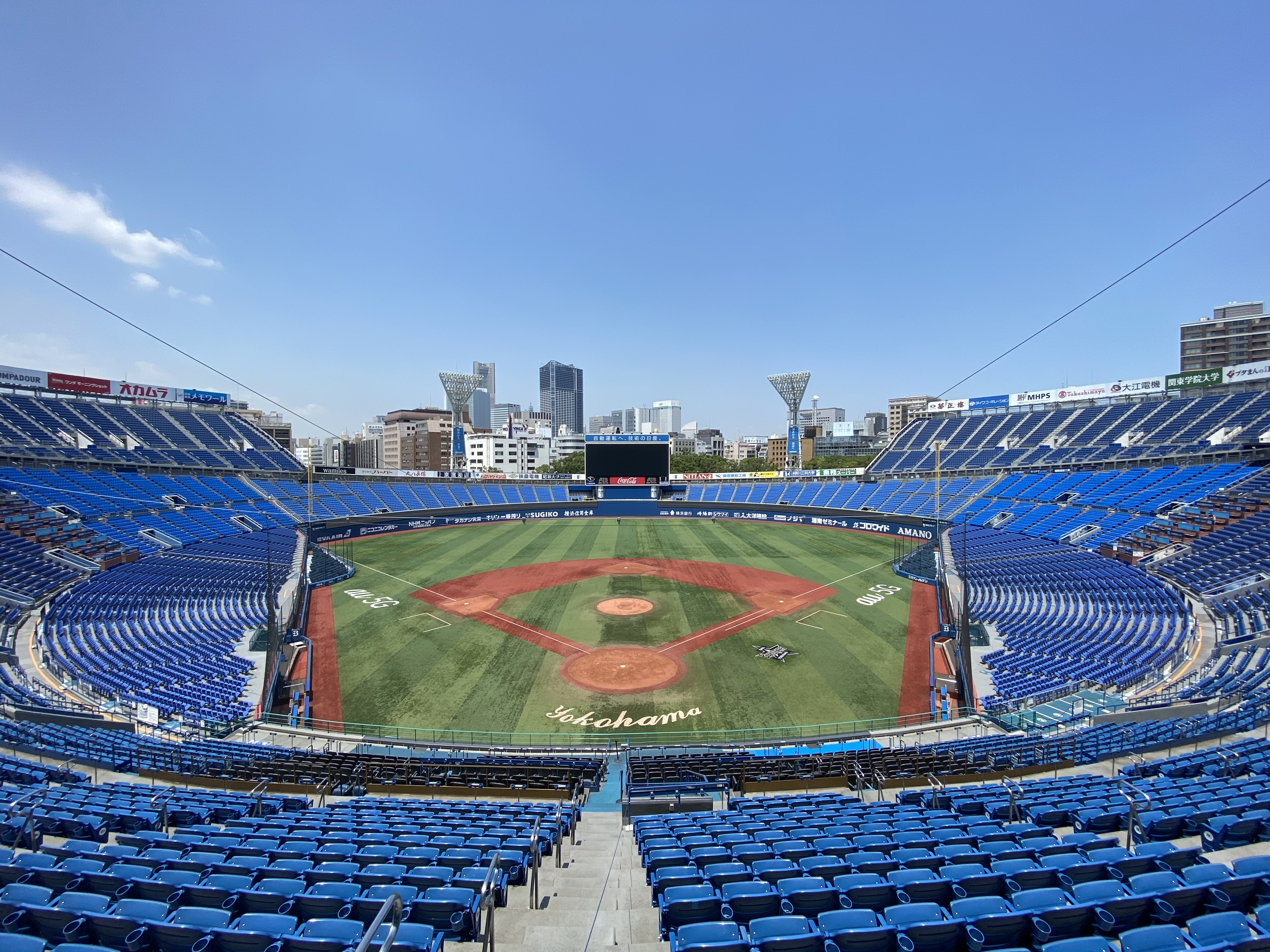
Yokohama Stadium – Baseball, softball

The transformation of Tokyo in preparation for the Olympics can be seen as part of a long process of urban planning and development that encompasses several major cycles. Urban studies scholar Faure notes that "The urban development strategy of the Tokyo Olympic urban project is the result of a long-time political compromise regarding Tokyo Bay between the ruling party, the TMG, and the central government." Examining the complex relationship between local ward development plans and metropolis-wide strategies pursued by the TMG (Tokyo Metropolitan Government), Faure notes that "the urban legacy of Tokyo 2020 is composed of a series of decisions beginning from the submission of the bid to the post-Olympic period, and extending over 9 years if we consider only the preparatory period until the legacy works (2013–2022), and over 30 years if we look at the origin of the selected Olympic sites and the previous bids for the 2016 Games and the 1994 Universal Expo."

In February 2012, it was announced that former Tokyo's National Stadium, the central venue for the 1964 Summer Olympics, would undergo a ¥100 billion renovation for the 2019 Rugby World Cup and the 2020 Summer Olympics. In November 2012, the Japan Sport Council announced it was taking bids for proposed stadium designs. Of the 46 finalists, Zaha Hadid Architects was awarded the project, which would replace the old stadium with a new 80,000-seat stadium. There was criticism of the Zaha Hadid design—which was compared to a bicycle helmet and regarded as clashing with the surrounding Meiji Shrine—and widespread disapproval of the costs, even with attempts to revise and "optimize" the design.

In June 2015, the government announced it was planning to reduce the new stadium's permanent capacity to 65,000 in its athletics configuration (although with the option to add up to 15,000 temporary seats for football) as a further cost-saving measure. The original plans to build a retractable roof were also scrapped. As a result of public opposition to the increasing costs of the stadium, which reached ¥252 billion, the government ultimately chose to reject Zaha Hadid's design entirely and selected a new design by Japanese architect Kengo Kuma. Inspired by traditional temples and with a lower profile, Kuma's design had a budget of ¥149 billion. Changes in plans prevented the new stadium from being completed in time for the 2019 Rugby World Cup as originally intended. National Stadium was inaugurated on 21 December 2019 and is named Olympic Stadium during 2020 Olympic Games.

Of the 33 competition venues in Tokyo, 28 are within 8 kilometers (5 miles) of the Olympic Village, with eleven new venues which were constructed. On 16 October 2019, the IOC announced that there were plans to re-locate the marathon and racewalking events to Sapporo for heat concerns. The plans were made official on 1 November 2019 after Tokyo Governor Yuriko Koike accepted the IOC's decision, despite her belief that the events should have remained in Tokyo.

=== Heritage Zone ===
Six venues for eight sports are located within the central business area of Tokyo, northwest of the Olympic Village. Three of these venues were originally constructed for the 1964 Summer Olympics.

Venue	Events Olympics	Capacity	Status
Japan National Stadium (known as Olympic Stadium during the games)^{*}	Opening and closing ceremonies	68,000	Built for the games
Japan National Stadium (known as Olympic Stadium during the games)^{*}	Athletics (track and field)	68,000	Built for the games
Nippon Budokan^{††}	Judo	14,471	Existing
Nippon Budokan^{††}	Karate	14,471	Existing
Yoyogi National Gymnasium^{†}	Handball	13,291	Existing
Kokugikan Arena	Boxing	11,098	Existing
Tokyo Metropolitan Gymnasium^{†}	Table tennis	10,000	Existing
Tokyo International Forum	Weightlifting	5,012	Existing

^{*}Built on the site of the old National Stadium (used for the 1964 Summer Olympics)
^{†}Originally constructed for the 1964 Summer Olympics ^{††}It was not specifically built for the 1964 Games, but was used for the same functions.

=== Tokyo Bay Zone ===
There are 13 venues planned for 15 sports located in the vicinity of Tokyo Bay, southeast of the Olympic Village, predominantly on Ariake, Odaiba and the surrounding artificial islands. The flame cauldron was installed at Tokyo Waterfront City on Ariake West Canal.

Venue	Events	Capacity	Status
Kasai Canoe Slalom Centre	Canoeing (slalom)	8,000	Built for the games
Oi Hockey Stadium	Field hockey	15,000	Built for the games
Tokyo Aquatics Centre	Aquatics (swimming, diving, artistic swimming)	15,000	Built for the games
Tokyo Tatsumi International Swimming Center	Water polo	3,635	Existing
Yumenoshima Park	Archery	7,000	Built for the games
Ariake Arena	Volleyball	12,000	Built for the games
Ariake Urban Sports Park	BMX racing,	6,600	Completed
Ariake Urban Sports Park	BMX freestyle	5,000	Completed
Ariake Urban Sports Park	Skateboarding	7,000	Completed
Ariake Gymnastics Centre	Gymnastics (artistic, rhythmic, trampoline)	10,000	Built for the games
Ariake Tennis Park (Ariake Coliseum)	Tennis	20,000 = 10,000 center court; 5,000 court 1; 3,000 court 2; 2,000 match courts (8x250)	Existing, renovated
Odaiba Marine Park	Triathlon	5,000 seated, unlimited standing room along route	Existing with temporary stands
Odaiba Marine Park	Aquatics (marathon swimming)	5,000 seated, unlimited standing room along route	Existing with temporary stands
Shiokaze Park	Beach volleyball	12,000	Temporary
Central Breakwater and Sea Forest Waterway	Equestrian (eventing)	20,000	Existing with temporary infrastructure
Central Breakwater and Sea Forest Waterway	Rowing	20,000	Existing with temporary infrastructure
Central Breakwater and Sea Forest Waterway	Canoeing (sprint)	20,000	Existing with temporary infrastructure
Aomi Urban Sports Park	3x3 basketball	7,100	Temporary
Aomi Urban Sports Park	Sport climbing	8,400	Temporary

=== Outlying venues ===
There are 16 venues for 16 sports situated farther than 8 kilometers (5 miles) from the Olympic Village.

Venue	Events	Capacity	Status
Camp Asaka	Shooting	3,200	Existing, renovated
Musashino Forest Sport Plaza	Modern pentathlon (fencing)	10,000	Built for the games
Musashino Forest Sport Plaza	Badminton	10,000	Built for the games
Musashinonomori Park, Fuchū	Road cycling (start road races)		Temporary
Tokyo Stadium	Football (opening round matches)	49,970	Existing
Tokyo Stadium	Modern pentathlon (excluding fencing)	49,970	Existing
Tokyo Stadium	Rugby sevens	49,970	Existing
Saitama Super Arena	Basketball	22,000	Existing
Enoshima	Sailing	10,000	Existing with temporary stands
Makuhari Messe	Fencing	6,000	Existing with temporary stands
Makuhari Messe	Taekwondo	8,000	Existing with temporary stands
Makuhari Messe	Wrestling	8,000	Existing with temporary stands
Tokyo Equestrian Park, Setagaya	Equestrian (dressage, jumping)	9,300	Existing with temporary stands
Kasumigaseki Country Club	Golf	30,000	Existing with temporary stands
Izu Velodrome, Shizuoka	Track cycling	5,000	Existing, expanded
Izu Mountain Bike Course, Shizuoka	Mountain biking	11,500	Existing
Yokohama Stadium	Baseball	30,000	Existing
Yokohama Stadium	Softball	30,000	Existing
Fukushima Azuma Baseball Stadium	Baseball (opening match)	30,000	Existing, renovated
Fukushima Azuma Baseball Stadium	Softball (opening match)	30,000	Existing, renovated
Fuji Speedway	Road cycling (finish road races, time trial)	22,000	Existing
Odori Park	Athletics (Marathon and Race walking)	17,300	Existing
Tsurigasaki Surfing Beach, Chiba	Surfing	6,000	Existing

=== Football venues ===
Venue	Location	Events	Matches	Capacity	Status
International Stadium Yokohama	Yokohama	Men's and Women's preliminaries and quarter-final, Women's semi-final, finals, Men's final	12	70,000	Existing
Tokyo Stadium	Tokyo	Men's and Women's opening round	4	49,000	Existing
Saitama Stadium	Saitama	Men's and Women's preliminaries and quarter-final, Men's semi-final and 3rd place play-off	11	62,000	Existing
Miyagi Stadium	Sendai	Men's and Women's preliminaries and quarter-final	10	49,000	Existing
Kashima Soccer Stadium	Kashima	Men's and Women's preliminaries, quarter-final and semi-final, Women's 3rd place play-off	10	40,728	Existing
Sapporo Dome	Sapporo	Men's and Women's preliminaries	10	42,000	Existing

=== Non-competition venues ===
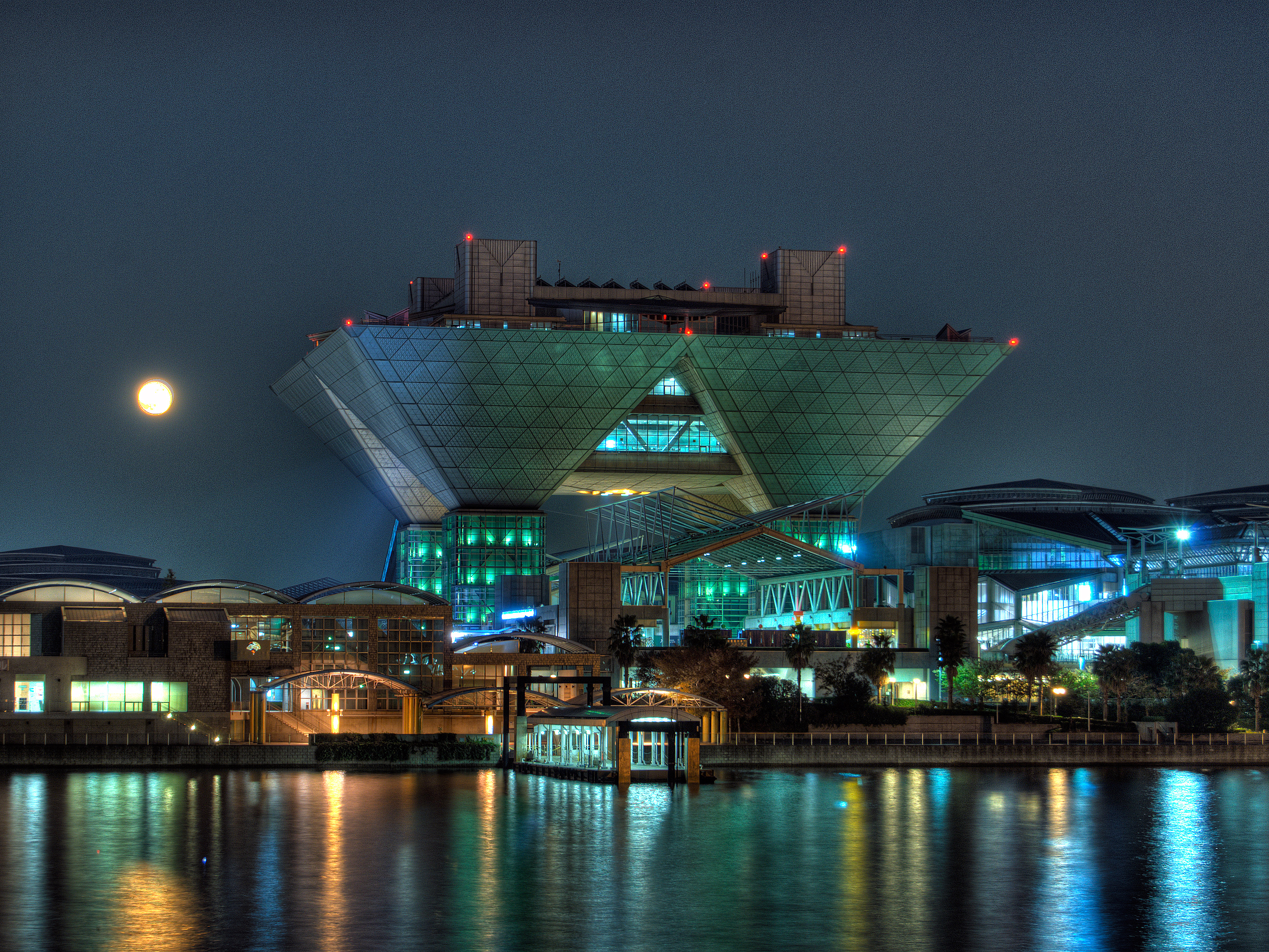
The Tokyo Big Sight Conference Tower was used as the IBC/MPC complex.

Venue	Events
Hotel Okura Tokyo	Olympic Family Hotel
Harumi Futo	Olympic Village
Tokyo Big Sight	International Broadcast Center (IBC)
Tokyo Big Sight	Media Press Center (MPC)
