= Venues of the 1948 Summer Olympics =

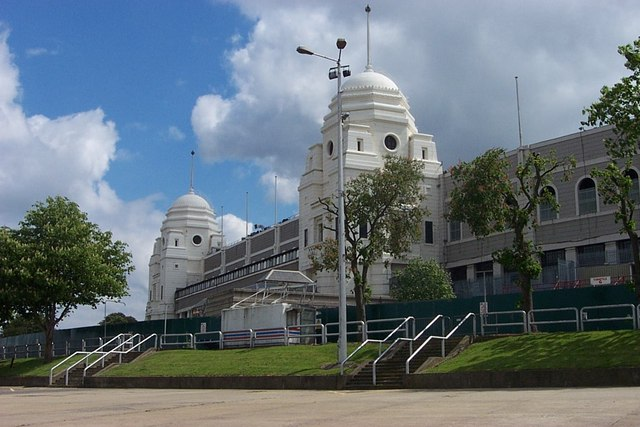
The twin towers of Wembley Stadium, previously known as Empire Stadium, in 2002

A total of twenty-five sports venues were used to host the events of the 1948 Summer Olympics in London, United Kingdom. For the first time in the history of the modern Olympic Games, the diving, gymnastics, swimming, and water polo competitions were held indoors. These Games have since been nicknamed the "Austerity Games" for the tight control of costs at a time when the host nation was still under rationing, which resulted in a total expenditure of around £750,000. All of the venues were already in place and required only temporary modifications. The organizing committee decided not to build an Olympic Village; instead, foreign athletes were housed in makeshift camps at military bases and colleges around London, while local athletes were told to stay at home. Despite these measures, the combined venues of the 1948 Summer Olympics recorded the highest attendance figures for a Games at that time.

The Empire Stadium (later to be known as Wembley Stadium) was chosen as the main venue, ahead of the White City Stadium, which had assumed that role during the 1908 Summer Olympics. This was due to the Empire Stadium's ability to hold a greater number of events, reducing the need for additional venues to be found. A new approach road was required to connect the stadium to the nearby Wembley Park tube station, so it was agreed that Wembley Stadium Ltd. would cover the costs in return for a share of the proceeds for the events held there. Motorcycle and greyhound races usually held at the Empire Stadium were highly profitable events, which meant that a cinder running track was not laid down until two weeks before the opening ceremony. Lacking an infield lighting system, cars were driven inside the stadium to illuminate it for the last two events of the decathlon. The cycling tandem event, which was held in the dark, was another example of the main venue's lighting issues. After the Games it was used as the English national football stadium, hosting numerous concerts and sporting events, including the 1966 FIFA World Cup Final and the British leg of Live Aid in 1985. It was closed in 2000, and demolished three years later to allow the construction of the new Wembley Stadium.

Adjacent to the stadium was the Empire Pool, which hosted the Olympic aquatic events and was the first-ever indoor Olympic pool. The pool was longer than the Olympic standard of 50 metres (160 ft), so a wooden platform had to be built to reduce the overall length. Due to lack of space, the pool was covered over so that boxing events could take place. The blackout paint which covered all of the venue windows – still remaining from the Second World War – had to be removed before the Games. The Olympics were the last event to make use of this pool, before it was concreted over.

Aldershot was chosen over Windsor Great Park to host most of the Equestrian events. The central sports ground at Aldershot Command was selected to host the equestrian events with the exception of the team jumping events, and a demonstration by the individual dressage gold medalist, which were both held at Empire Stadium on the last day of the games. It was also chosen to host several events in the modern pentathlon event; the venue had previously hosted the British Championship in 1947.

Bisley and Henley had both been previously used as venues during the 1908 Games. Bisley hosted most of the shooting events while Henley hosted the rowing competition. Henley continues to host the Royal Regatta, which started in 1839, and remains in use as of 2010 for global competition, including the Diamond Sculls event. The Harringay Arena was built in 1928 and staged sporting events until its demolition in 1958. Built in 1891, the Herne Hill Velodrome hosted track cycling. After falling into disrepair by 2011, a modernization plan was implemented to make extensive structural repairs to the site and install a new track surface so that it could be used by British Cycling, the national sport governing body.

To reduce the number of military bands necessary to play the national anthem of the gold medallist, the medal ceremony for most events was not held at the event venue, but rather at the Empire Stadium, typically the following day. Sports whose venues (other than the Empire Stadium) held their medal ceremonies were swimming, rowing, gymnastics and track cycling (immediately after each event) and yachting and boxing (after the final event).

For London 2012, the Empress Hall (now Earls Court Exhibition Centre) and Empire Pool (now Wembley Arena) were once again used as venues. The former hosted the volleyball events while the latter hosted badminton and rhythmic gymnastics.

== Venues ==
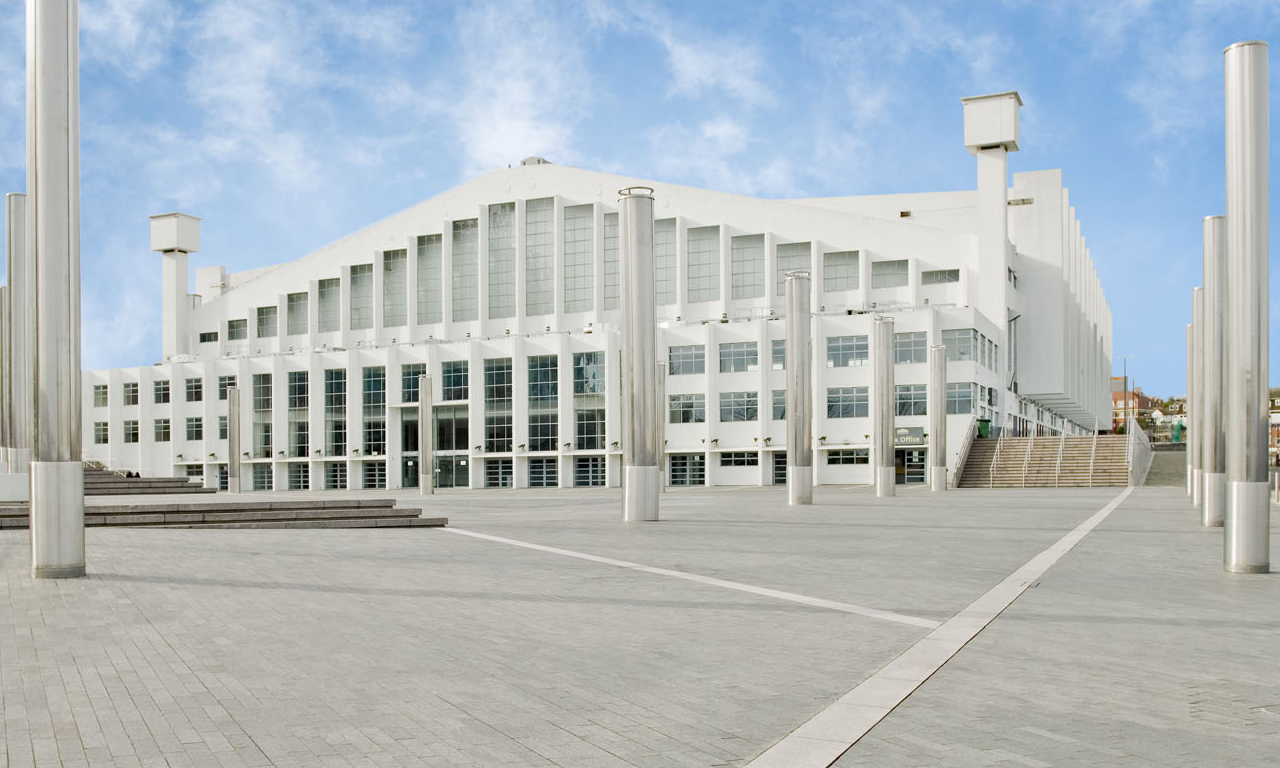
Empire Pool, now known as Wembley Arena, in 2007

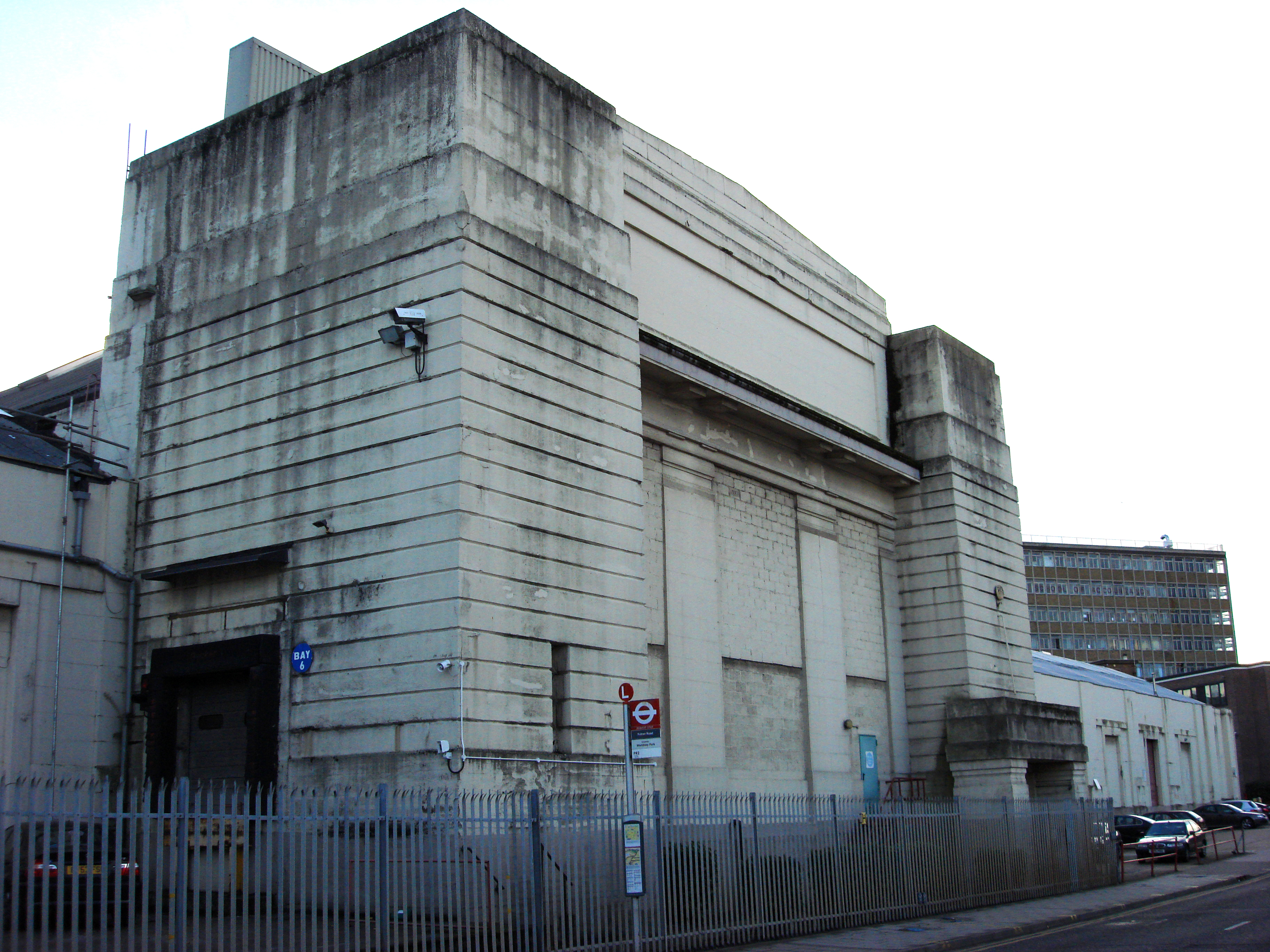
The Wembley Palace of Engineering, after conversion to warehousing, in 2007

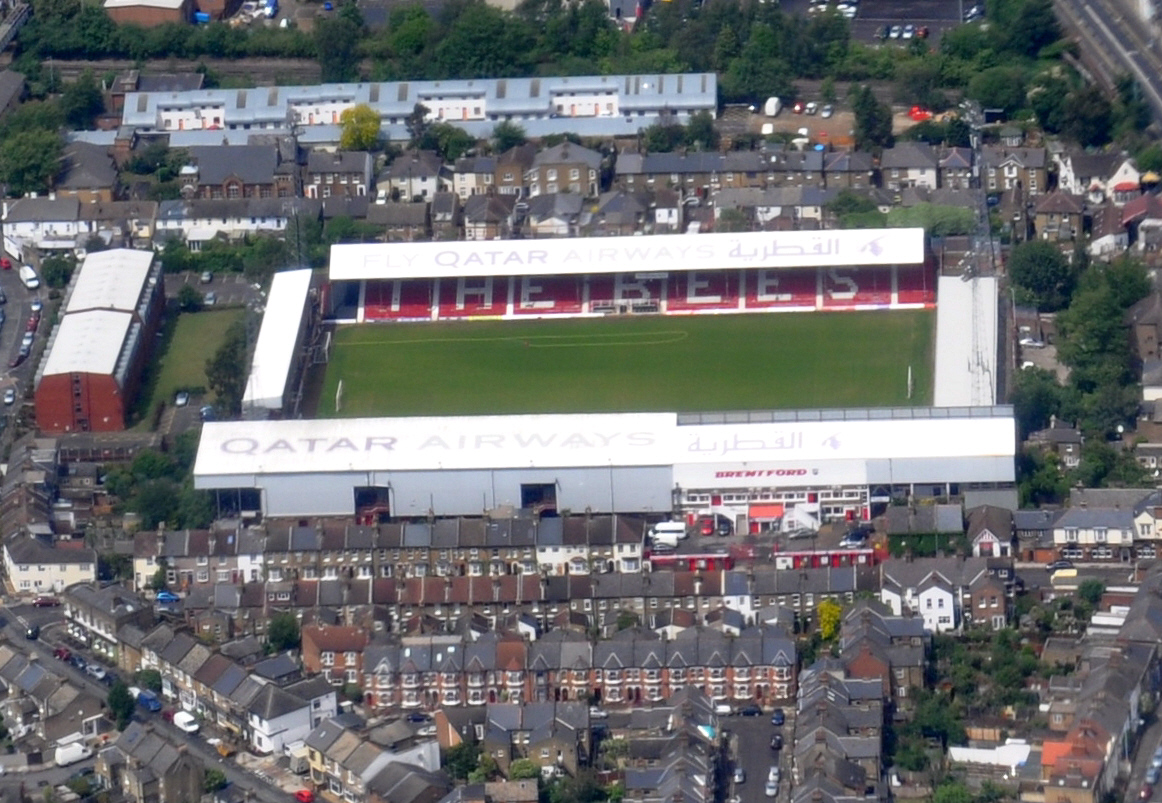
Griffin Park Stadium, where some of the football tournament was held, viewed from the air in 2011

=== London-based venues ===
List of venues of the 1948 Summer Olympics in London
Venue	Sports	Capacity (Note: Capacity as listed at the time of the Games by the Official Report of the Organising Committee for the XIV Olympiad.)	Ref(s).
Arsenal Stadium	Football	73,000	
Champion Hill	Football	3,000	
Craven Cottage	Football	25,700	
Empire Pool	Boxing, diving, swimming, water polo	12,500	
Empire Stadium	Athletics, equestrian (team jumping), field hockey (medal matches), football (medal matches)	82,000	
Empress Hall, Fulham	Boxing, gymnastics, weightlifting, wrestling	19,000	
Finchley Lido	Water polo	Not listed	
Green Pond Road Stadium	Football	21,708	
Griffin Park	Football	12,763	
Guinness Sports Club	Field hockey	Not listed	
Harringay Arena	Basketball, wrestling	Not listed	
Herne Hill Velodrome	Cycling (track)	Not listed	
Lynn Road	Football	3,500	
Lyons' Sports Club	Field hockey	Not listed	
Polytechnic Sports Ground	Field hockey	Not listed	
Selhurst Park	Football	26,309	
Wembley Palace of Engineering	Fencing	Not listed	
White Hart Lane	Football	36,310	

=== Venues outside London ===
List of venues of the 1948 Summer Olympics outside London
Venue	Location	Sports	Capacity	Ref(s).
Aldershot Lido	Aldershot	Modern pentathlon (swimming)	Not listed	
Bisley National Rifle Association Ranges	Bisley, Surrey	Modern pentathlon (shooting), shooting	Not listed	
Central Stadium	Aldershot Military Headquarters	Equestrian (dressage (standalone and eventing), jumping (individual and eventing))	Not listed	
Central Gymnasium (Note: Now Fox's Gymnasium)	Aldershot Military Headquarters	Modern pentathlon (fencing)	Not listed	
Fratton Park	Portsmouth	Football	Not listed	
Goldstone Ground	Brighton	Football	Not listed	
Henley Royal Regatta	Henley-on-Thames	Canoeing, rowing	Not listed	
Royal Military Academy environs	Sandhurst, Berkshire (Note: The course extended into Camberley, Surrey)	Modern pentathlon (running)	Not listed	
Tor Bay	Devon	Sailing	Not listed	
Tweseldown Racecourse (Note: The cross-country course in the modern pentathlon was confined to Tweseldown Racecourse in Fleet. The longer course in the eventing extended to Old Dean Common in Camberley.)	Fleet, Hampshire	Equestrian (eventing cross-country), modern pentathlon (riding)	Not listed	
Windsor Great Park	Windsor, Berkshire	Cycling (road)	Not listed	
