= J. Nash McCrea =

American cyclist and journalist (1887–1959)

Personal information
- Full name: Jay Nash McCrea
- Born: January 15, 1887 Springfield, Illinois, U.S.
- Died: September 20, 1959 (aged 72) Cudahy, Wisconsin, U.S.

Cycling career
- Sport: Cycling

Jay Nash McCrea (January 15, 1887 – September 20, 1959) was an American cyclist and newspaper editor. Nicknamed "Crash" for his "dangerous" and "wild" riding style, he competed in the men's one mile and men's five mile events at the 1904 Summer Olympics, but did not finish either event.

== Early life and cycling career ==
Jay Nash McCrea was born on January 15, 1887, in Springfield, Illinois. He began cycling competitively at Springfield High School, and was named their representative in the Central Illinois Athletic Association tournament c. 1901, at which he finished sixth in the quarter-mile race and fourth in the single-mile race, performing "remarkably well". He stopped racing until 1903, but then began winning many half-mile and one-mile tournaments. He won the Central Illinois championship, and was selected as the central Illinois representative for the United States cycling team, which was to compete at the 1904 Summer Olympics in St. Louis, Missouri.

McCrea, aged 17 at the time, competed at the men's five mile and one mile events, but never was in the front and did not finish either event. Nicknamed "Crash" for his "wild" and "dangerous" riding style, he stayed true to his nickname in the five mile race. On the second-to-last lap, he swerved into a cyclist next to him, who then crashed into two others, resulting in all four falling. Close behind were four more riders, who, unable to avoid it, crashed into the others. As a result, only four cyclists were able to finish, and the rider who had been in last place for the entire event won the gold medal. The magazine Bicycling World described McCrea's style as follows: "he does not seem to be a vicious rider, but simply rides all over the track and is dangerous for that reason."

About one month after the Olympics, McCrea returned to Missouri and won the state championship. In subsequent years, he became one of the best cyclists in that area of the country. By 1908, he had competed in 74 events, compiling 40 first-place finishes, 14 second-place finishes, six thirds, two fourths, two sixths, and one thirteenth, along with eight falls and one disqualification.

== Later life ==
After his cycling career, McCrea became a newspaper writer and also officiated races. He was an editor for The Herald c. 1910 and by 1911 was working with the Illinois State Register. He also served as a member of the Springfield Cycling Club executive board around this time. He became an editor for a paper in Quincy, Illinois, in July 1917, and by the end of that year was with a newspaper named The Capital. McCrea joined the staff of the Omaha News in January 1918. He also was a member of the United States Olympic Cycling Committee at about this time.

By 1924, McCrea had moved to Milwaukee, Wisconsin, and became editor for the Milwaukee Leader. He later wrote for the Milwaukee Sentinel and Wisconsin News. McCrea led the Milwaukee Newspaper guild strike in 1936, which resulted in higher pay and shorter working hours after the guild was on strike for seven months. He was still working as a newspaperman by 1946 and was for a time the president of the American Newspaper Guild Midwest district, although he listed his occupation in census records as "spiritual healer." Newspaper positions he held during his career included sportswriter, real estate editor, automotive editor, and copy editor. He also worked for the local radio, serving as the voice of "Sunny Jim" at WISN. McCrea died on September 20, 1959, at the age of 72, in Cudahy, Wisconsin.
