= Venues of the 1964 Summer Olympics =

For the 1964 Summer Olympics, a total of thirty-three sports venues were used. Six of the venues were built before the International Olympic Committee awarded the 1964 Games to Tokyo in 1959. This included two venues that hosted the 1958 Asian Games. There were thirteen new, eight temporary, and five reconstructed and/or renovated venues that were used during the event. During the Olympics, wind and weather had issues with two athletic events. After the Olympics, one venue (Osaka Stadium) hosted both a FIFA World Cup and a World Athletics Championship event while another (Tokyo National Stadium) also hosted a World Athletics Championship event.

== Venues ==
Venue	Sports	Capacity	Constructed	Ref.
Asaka Nezu Park	Modern pentathlon (riding)	1,300	Temporary	
Asaka Shooting Range	Modern pentathlon (shooting), Shooting (pistol/ rifle)	1,200	New	
Chofu City	Athletics (marathon, 50 km walk)	Not listed.	Temporary	
Enoshima	Sailing	Not listed.	New	
Fuchu City	Athletics (marathon, 50 km walk)	Not listed.	Temporary	
Hachioji City	Cycling (road)	3,000	Temporary	
Hachioji Velodrome	Cycling (track)	4,122	Temporary	
Karasuyama-machi	Athletics (marathon, 50 km walk)	Not listed.	Temporary	
Karuizawa	Equestrian	1,524	504 (Temporary)	
Kemigawa	Modern pentathlon (running)	1,504	Temporary	
Komazawa Gymnasium	Wrestling	3,875	New	
Komazawa Hockey Field	Field hockey	2,056 (1st field); 3,432 (2nd field); 2,343 (3rd field)	New	
Komazawa Stadium	Football (preliminaries)	20,784	New	
Komazawa Volleyball Courts	Volleyball (preliminaries)	3,908	New	
Korakuen Ice Palace	Boxing	4,464	Renovated	
Lake Sagami	Canoeing	1,500	New	
Mitsuzawa Football Field (Yokohama)	Football (preliminaries)	10,102	New	
Nagai Stadium (Osaka)	Football (preliminaries)	20,000	New	
National Gymnasium	Basketball, Diving, Modern pentathlon (swimming), Swimming	3,929 (basketball); 11,112 (diving, swimming)	New	
National Stadium	Athletics, Equestrian (team jumping), Football (final)	71,556	Extension	
Nippon Budokan Hall	Judo	15,176	New	
Nishikyogoku Athletic Stadium (Kyoto)	Football (preliminaries)	10,000	Existing	
Ōmiya Football Field (Saitama)	Football (preliminaries)	14,392	New	
Prince Chichiba Memorial Football Field	Football (preliminaries)	17,569	Reconstructed	
Sasazuka-machi	Athletics (marathon, 50 km walk)	Not listed	Temporary	
Shibuya Public Hall	Weightlifting	2,222	New	
Shinjuku	Athletics (marathon, 50 km walk)	Not listed	Temporary	
Toda Rowing Course	Rowing	8,262	Reconstructed	
Tokorozawa Shooting Range	Shooting (trap)	1,284	New	
Tokyo Metropolitan Gymnasium	Gymnastics	6,474	Reconstructed	
Tokyo Metropolitan Indoor Swimming Pool	Water polo	3,014	Reconstructed	
Waseda Memorial Hall	Fencing, Modern pentathlon (fencing)	2,194	Renovated	
Yokohama Cultural Gymnasium	Volleyball	3,784	Renovated	

== Before the Olympics ==
Tokyo was selected in 1936 to host the 1940 Summer Olympics, but had to withdraw its hosting duties upon Japan's second invasion of China in the following year. This led the organizing committee to abandon organizing the 1940 Games altogether in 1938 with them being awarded to Helsinki though the Finnish city would abandon the 1940 Games themselves in the wake of World War II. After being excluded from the 1948 Summer Olympics due to their involvement in World War II, Japan launched their Olympic bid in 1950 and was selected to host the 1964 Summer Games in 1959.

Lake Sagami was created in 1947 when the Sagami River was dammed. Construction on the lake for the Olympics ran from July 1962 to August 1963. Besides Sagami, the only other venues that had been constructed prior to the International Olympic Committee awarding the 1964 Summer Games to Tokyo were the National Stadium, the Mitsuzawa Football Field, the Nishikyogoku Athletic Stadium, the Prince Chiba Memorial Football Field, the Todo Rowing Course, and the Tokyo Metropolitan Indoor Swimming Pool. For the 1958 Asian Games held in Tokyo, both the National Stadium and the Tokyo Metropolitan Indoor Swimming Pool were used as venues.

== During the Olympics ==
National Stadium had competitions which were affected by the weather, most notably in the long jump events where the men's event was held against the wind and was kept that way despite protests from American Ralph Boston and Soviet Igor Ter-Ovanesyan to change it to jumping with the wind behind them. In the women's event, British long jumper Mary Rand set a world record of 6.76 m (22 ft 2 in) despite jumping into a 1.69 m/s (3.8 mph) headwind.

Despite the use of electronic timing at the velodrome in the 4000 m team pursuit track cycling event, the judges involved in the final between the German United Team and Italians still took ten minutes to determine who won the gold medal.

Vyacheslav Ivanov would win his third straight gold medal in the single sculls rowing event held at the Todo Rowing Course.

The Metropolitan Indoor Pool had a depth of 5 ft 10 in (1.78 m) which allowed the taller Yugoslav players to stand with their heads above water during the water polo competitions. This resulted in complaints to water polo officials from the Hungarian and Italian teams.

== After the Olympics ==
The National Stadium played host to the 1991 World Championships in Athletics that included Mike Powell's world record in the men's long jump of 8.95 m (29 ft 4 in) that broke Bob Beamon's world record set at the 1968 Summer Olympics in Mexico City.

Nagai Stadium in Osaka was one of the host stadiums for the 2002 FIFA World Cup, hosting two preliminaries and a quarterfinal match. The same stadium also served as host venue for the 2007 World Championships in Athletics.

The National Gymnasium was originally constructed as an aquatics venue during the Games and now hosts events such as ice hockey, basketball, and concerts like other indoor arenas.
