= Frank Bizzoni =

Italian-American cyclist

Personal information
- Full name: Francesco Filippo Bizzoni
- Born: May 7, 1875 Lodi, Italy
- Died: December 25, 1926 (aged 51) The Bronx, United States

Cycling career
- Sport: Cycling
- Discipline: Track
- Role: Rider

Francesco Filippo "Frank" Bizzoni (May 7, 1875 – December 25, 1926) was an Italian track cyclist who competed in the St. Louis 1904 Summer Olympics. He was born in Lodi, Lombardy and died in the Bronx, New York.

In 1904, he was eliminated in the semi-final of the quarter mile competition. Bizzoni is the only known Italian competitor at the St. Louis Games in 1904. In all records, he is listed as an American cyclist because he immigrated to the States. He received U.S. citizenship in 1917.
