= List of Olympic venues =

As a multi-sport event, competitions held during a given Olympic Games usually take place in different venues located across the host city and its metropolitan area. However, some Olympic competitions may be held outside the host metropolitan area, and instead in other regions of the host country (as it is usually the case with Football at the Summer Olympics and its requirements for large stadia).

One venue is designated as the "Olympic Stadium", the big centrepiece stadium of the games. Traditionally at the Summer Olympic Games, the opening and closing ceremonies and the Athletics competitions are held in the Olympic Stadium. The Winter Olympic Games do not usually have a central Olympic Stadium, but instead have edifices that are designated as the Olympic Stadium to host the opening and closing ceremonies.

== Summer Olympics ==
=== Alphabetical ===
Number or letters	Number of venues
1–9	2
A	33
B	43
C	33
D	21
E	20
F	21
G	19
H	34
I	7
J	11
K	22
L	39
M	44
N	19
O	67
P	50
Q	4
R	31
S	79
T	24
U	7
V	17
W	25
X	0
Y	3
Z	4

=== Sport ===
Current for 2016

Discipline	Number of venues
Archery	16
Athletics	60
Badminton	8
Baseball	8
Basketball	29
Boxing	27
Canoeing	26
Cricket	1
Cycling	76
Diving	25
Equestrian	53
Fencing	31
Field hockey	32
Football	122
Golf	3
Gymnastics	34
Handball	27
Judo	15
Marathon swimming	7
Modern pentathlon	88
Rowing	27
Sailing	32
Shooting	38
Softball	4
Swimming	31
Synchronized swimming	9
Table tennis	8
Taekwondo	7
Tennis	15
Triathlon	5
Volleyball	32
Water polo	34
Weightlifting	25
Wrestling	29

Discontinued sports

Discipline	Number of venues
Basque pelota	2
Cricket	1
Croquet	1
Jeu de Paume	1
Lacrosse	2
Polo	5
Racquets	1
Rugby union	5
Tug of war	5
Water motorsports	1

Demonstration sports

Discipline	Number of venues
Bowling	1
Korfball	2
Roller hockey	4

=== Games by year ===
Games	Number of venues
1896 Athens	7
1900 Paris	14
1904 St. Louis	5
1908 London	12
1912 Stockholm	12
1920 Antwerp	17
1924 Paris	17
1928 Amsterdam	14
1932 Los Angeles	15
1936 Berlin	22
1948 London	25
1952 Helsinki	24
1956 Melbourne	17
1960 Rome	34
1964 Tokyo	33
1968 Mexico City	25
1972 Munich	32
1976 Montreal	27
1980 Moscow	28
1984 Los Angeles	31
1988 Seoul	31
1992 Barcelona	43
1996 Atlanta	29
2000 Sydney	30
2004 Athens	35
2008 Beijing	37
2012 London	31
2016 Rio de Janeiro	36
2020 Tokyo	41
2024 Paris	38
2028 Los Angeles	
2032 Brisbane	

== Winter Olympics ==
=== Alphabetical ===
Number or letters	Number of venues
1–9	0
A	7
B	12
C	11
D	2
E	3
F	2
G	3
H	6
I	5
J	3
K	10
L	23
M	27
N	3
O	16
P	14
Q	0
R	8
S	24
T	8
U	3
V	2
W	4
X	0
Y	0
Z	2

=== Sport ===
Current for 2014

Discipline	Number of venues
Alpine skiing	37
Biathlon	16
Bobsleigh	21
Cross-country skiing	22
Curling	8
Figure skating	27
Freestyle skiing	9
Ice hockey	46
Luge	14
Nordic combined	37
Short track speed skating	8
Skeleton	6
Ski jumping	26
Snowboarding	6
Speed skating	22

Demonstration sports

Discipline		Number of venues
	Bandy	2
To be done	Speed skiing	1

=== Games by year ===
Venues	Number of Games
1924 Chamonix	3
1928 St. Moritz	5
1932 Lake Placid	5
1936 Garmisch-Partenkirchen	6
1948 St. Moritz	8
1952 Oslo	10
1956 Cortina d'Ampezzo	8
1960 Squaw Valley	5
1964 Innsbruck	8
1968 Grenoble	10
1972 Sapporo	12
1976 Innsbruck	8
1980 Lake Placid	7
1984 Sarajevo	9
1988 Calgary	9
1992 Albertville	13
1994 Lillehammer	10
1998 Nagano	15
2002 Salt Lake City	10
2006 Turin	15
2010 Vancouver	10
2014 Sochi	11
2018 PyeongChang	13
2022 Beijing	13
2026 Milano-Cortina	

== See also ==
- List of Commonwealth Games venues
- List of Olympic Villages
