= List of Olympic venues in baseball =

For the Summer Olympics, there are nine venues that have been or will be used for baseball.

Games	Venue	Other sports hosted at venue for those games	Capacity	Ref.
1992 Barcelona	L'Hospitalet de Llobregat Baseball Stadium (final)	None	6,740	
1992 Barcelona	Camp Municipal de Beisbol de Viladecans	None	6,740	
1996 Atlanta	Atlanta–Fulton County Stadium	Softball	52,007	
2000 Sydney	Sydney Baseball Stadium (final)	Modern pentathlon	21,500	
2000 Sydney	Blacktown Olympic Park	Softball	3,000	
2004 Athens	Hellinikon Stadium	Softball	8,700	
2008 Beijing	Wukesong Baseball Field	Softball	15,000	
2020 Tokyo	Yokohama Stadium	Softball	30,000	
2020 Tokyo	Fukushima Azuma Baseball Stadium (opening match)	Softball	24,046	
2028 Los Angeles	Dodger Stadium	None	56,000	

== Gallery of venues ==
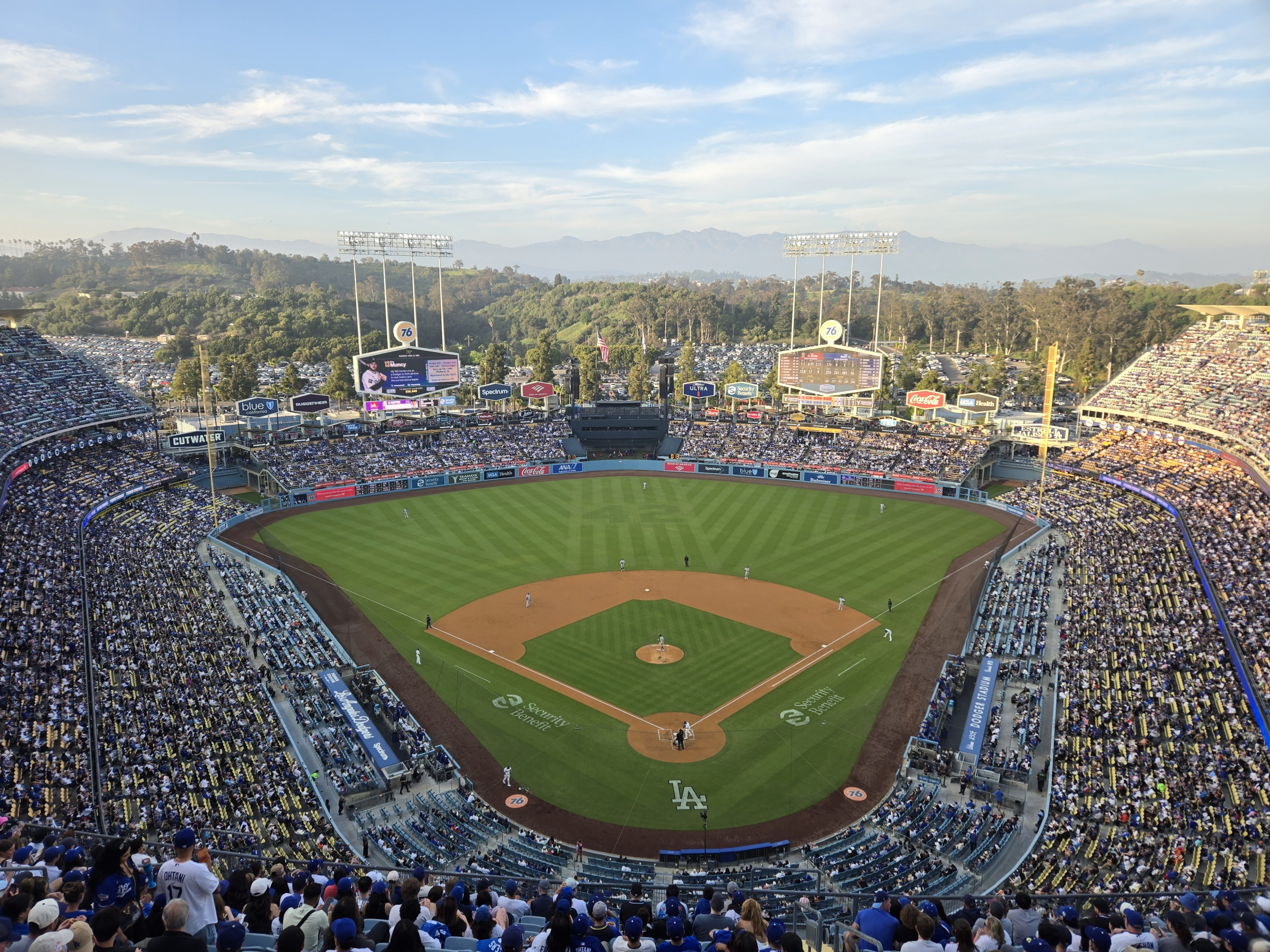
Dodger Stadium in Los Angeles hosted baseball at the 1984 Summer Olympics when it was a demonstration sport and will host baseball at the 2028 Summer Olympics.

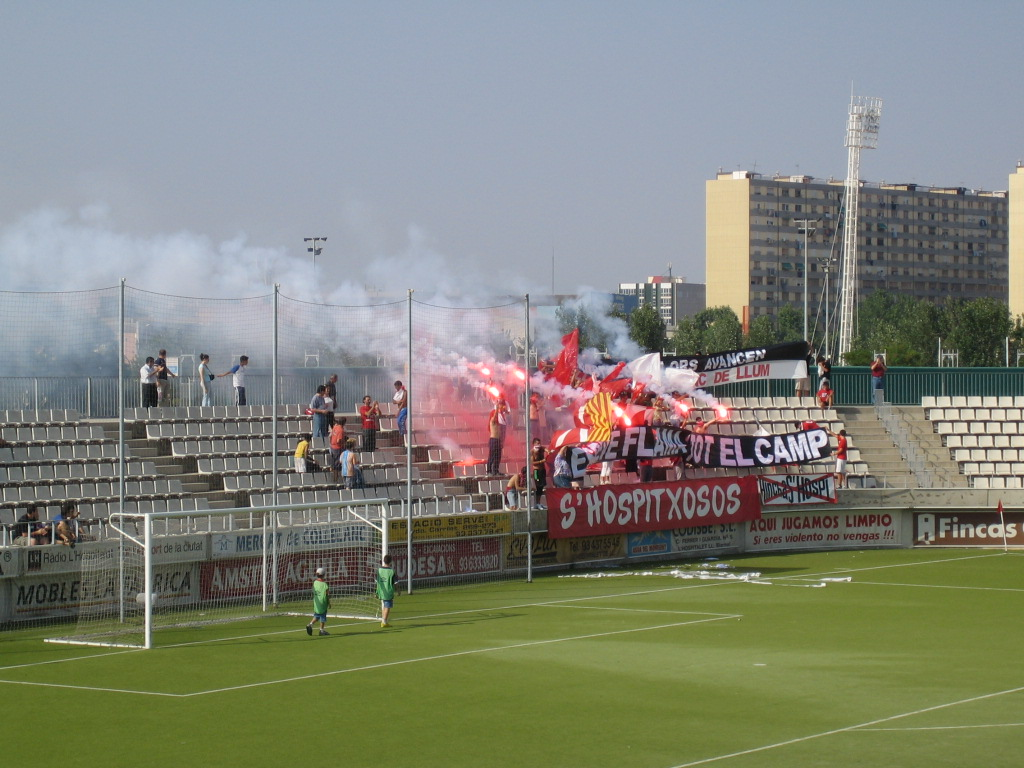
Estadi Municipal de Futbol de L'Hospitalet hosted baseball at the 1992 Summer Olympics in Barcelona.

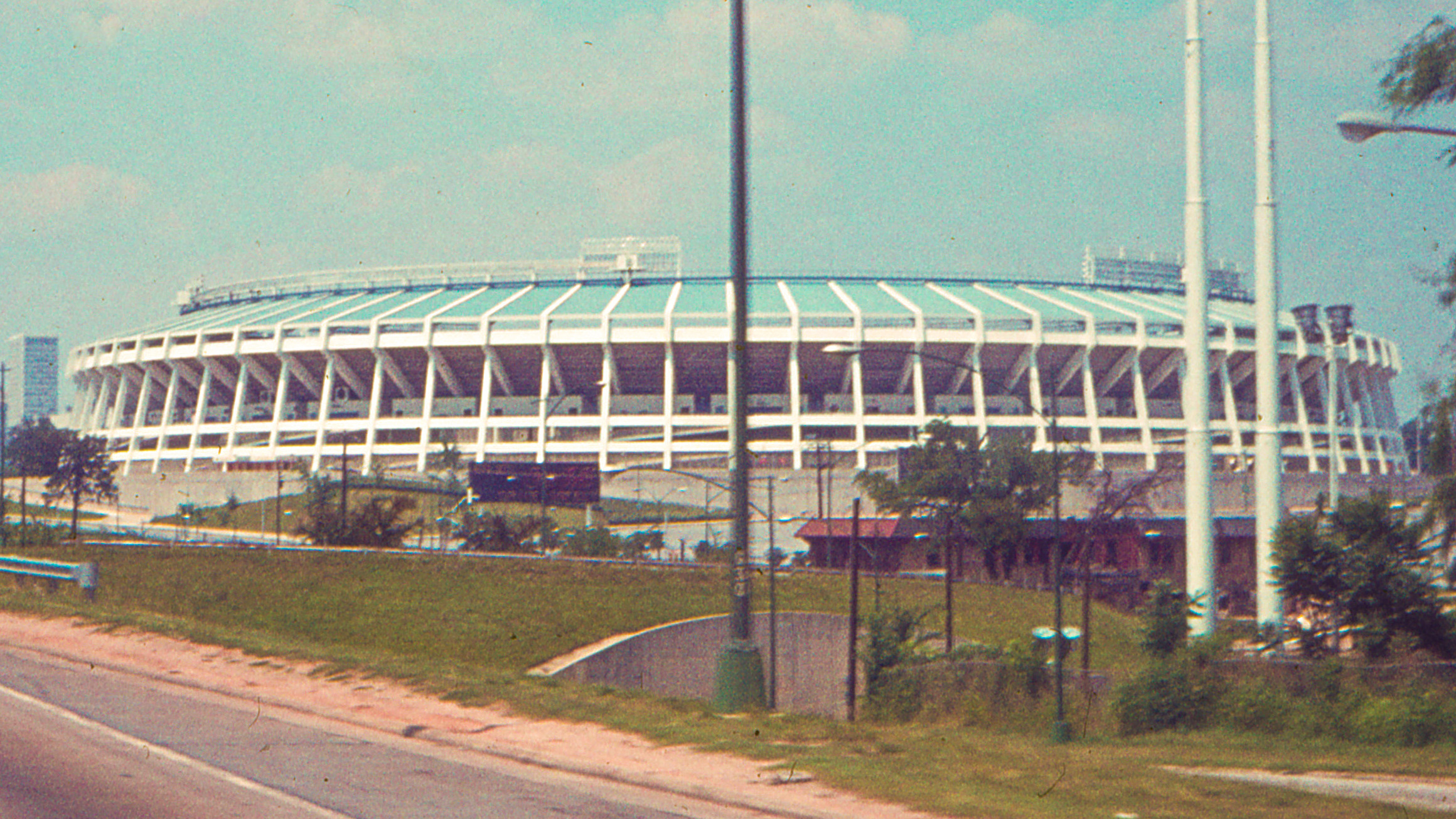
Atlanta–Fulton County Stadium hosted baseball at the 1996 Summer Olympics

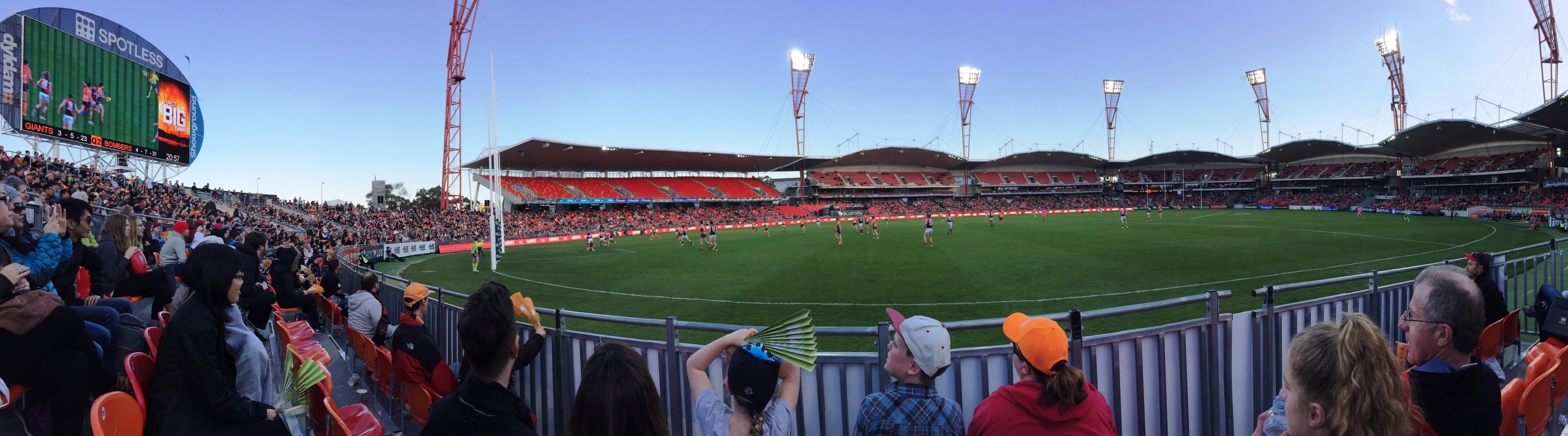
Sydney Showground Stadium hosted baseball at the 2000 Summer Olympics in Sydney.

Hellinikon Stadium hosted baseball at the 2004 Summer Olympics in Athens.

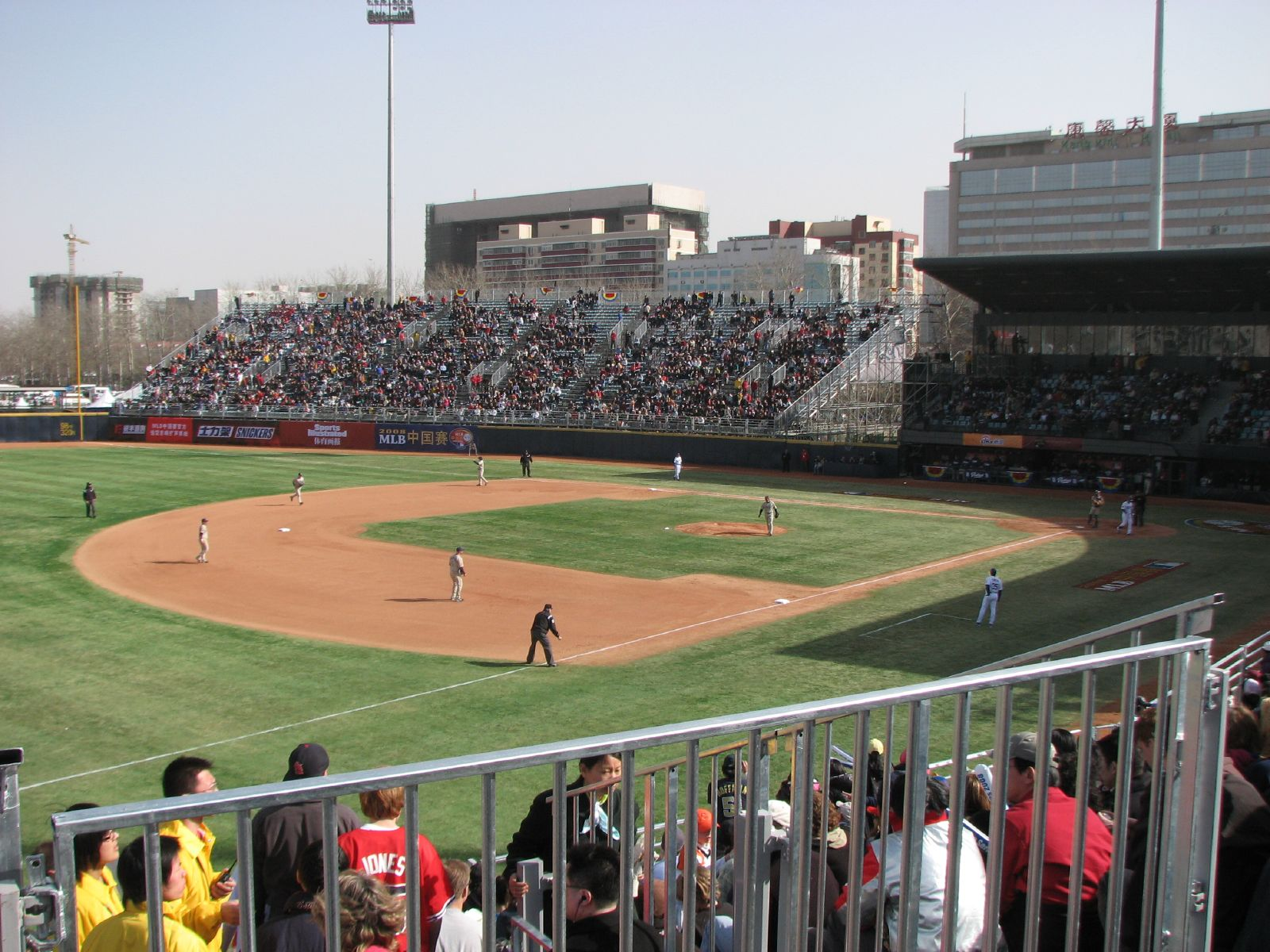
The Wukesong Baseball Field hosted baseball at the 2008 Summer Olympics in Beijing.

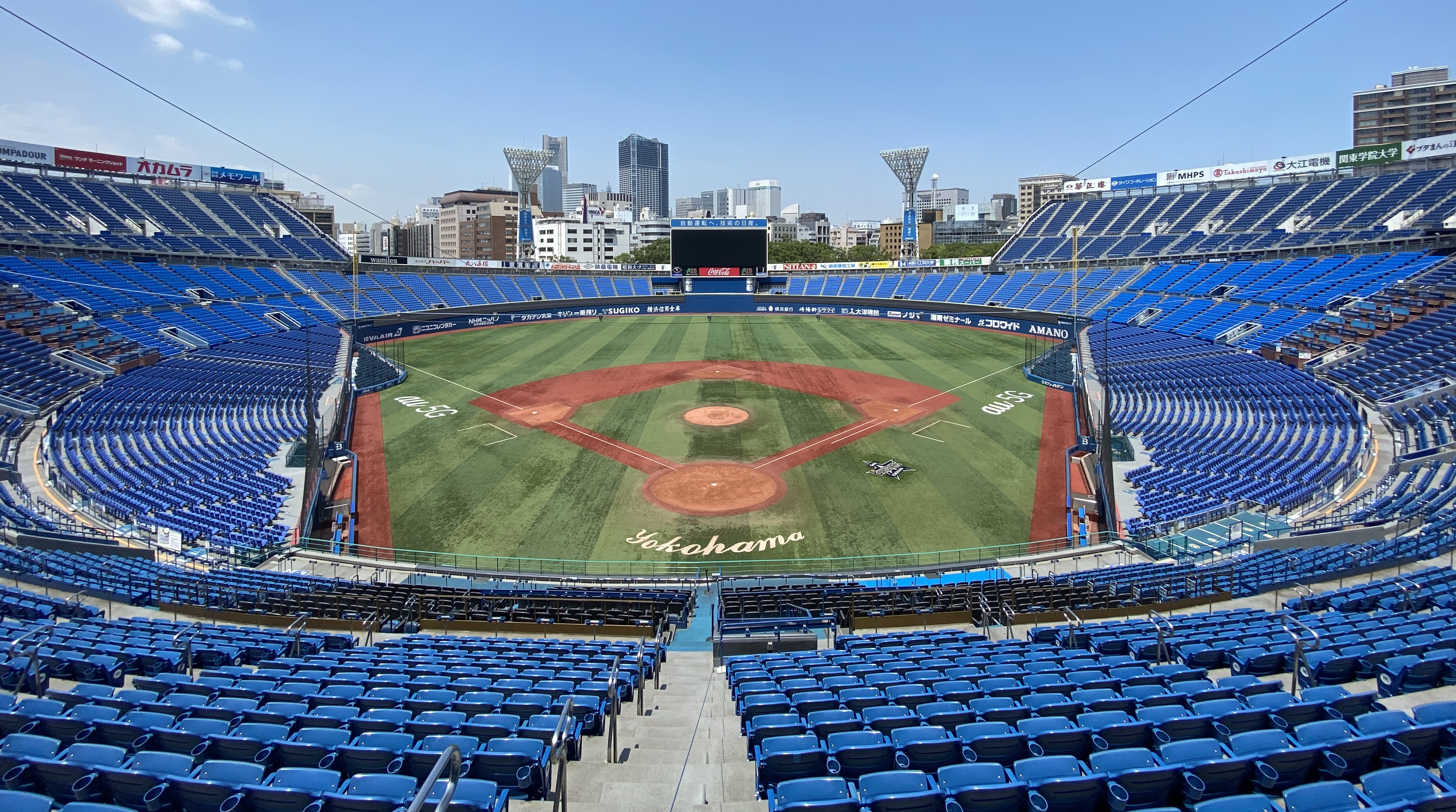
Yokohama Stadium hosted baseball at the 2020 Summer Olympics in Tokyo.
