= Venues of the 1948 Winter Olympics =

For the 1948 Winter Olympics in St. Moritz, Switzerland, a total of eight sports venues were used. The five venues used for the 1928 Winter Olympics were reused for these games. Three new venues were added for alpine skiing which had been added to the Winter Olympics program twelve years earlier in Garmisch-Partenkirchen, Germany (Allied-occupied Germany during the 1948 Games). As of 2015, the bob run continues to be used for bobsleigh and the Cresta Run for skeleton while alpine skiing remains popular in St. Moritz.

== Venues ==
Venue	Sports	Capacity	Ref.
Around the hills of St. Moritz	Cross-country skiing, Nordic combined (cross-country skiing)	Not listed.	
Cresta Run	Skeleton	Not listed.	
Kulm	Ice hockey	Not listed.	
Olympiaschanze St. Moritz	Ski jumping, Nordic combined (ski jumping)	Not listed.	
Olympic Stadium	Opening / closing ceremonies, Figure skating, Ice hockey (final), Speed skating	Not listed.	
Piz Nair	Alpine skiing	Not listed.	
St. Moritz-Celerina Olympic Bobrun	Bobsleigh	Not listed.	
Suvretta	Ice hockey	Not listed.	

== Before the Olympics ==
St. Moritz hosted the Winter Olympics previously in 1928. All five venues from those games were reused for the 1948 Winter Olympics. St. Moritz hosted the FIBT World Championships in 1931 (four-man), 1937 (four-man), 1938 (two-man), 1939 (two-man), and 1947. Switzerland itself hosted the Ice Hockey World Championships twice in between the 1928 and 1948 Games, doing so in 1935 and 1939 though neither took place in St. Moritz. As an alpine skiing venue, St. Moritz hosted the FIS Alpine World Ski Championships in 1934.

== During the Olympics ==
Midway through the second run of the bobsleigh four-man event, a water pipe burst which halted competition. They still completed all four runs of the event.

== After the Olympics ==
The ski jump was renovated in 1963 to get it to a K-point of 90 m (300 ft). It closed in 2006. The bob run has hosted the FIBT World Championships sixteen more times since the 1948 Games, most recently in 2007. St. Moritz hosted its first recorded alpine skiing World Cup event in 1971. The city hosted the Alpine skiing World Championships in 1974 and 2003.
