= List of Olympic venues in golf =

For the Summer Olympics, there are seven venues that have been or will be used for golf.

Games	Venue	Other sports hosted at venue for those games	Ref.
1900 Paris	Compiègne	None	
1904 St. Louis	Glen Echo Country Club	None	
2016 Rio de Janeiro	Olympic Golf Course	None	
2020 Tokyo	Kasumigaseki Country Club	None	
2024 Paris	Le Golf National	None	
2028 Los Angeles	Riviera Country Club	None	
2032 Brisbane	Royal Queensland Golf Club	None	

== Gallery of venues ==
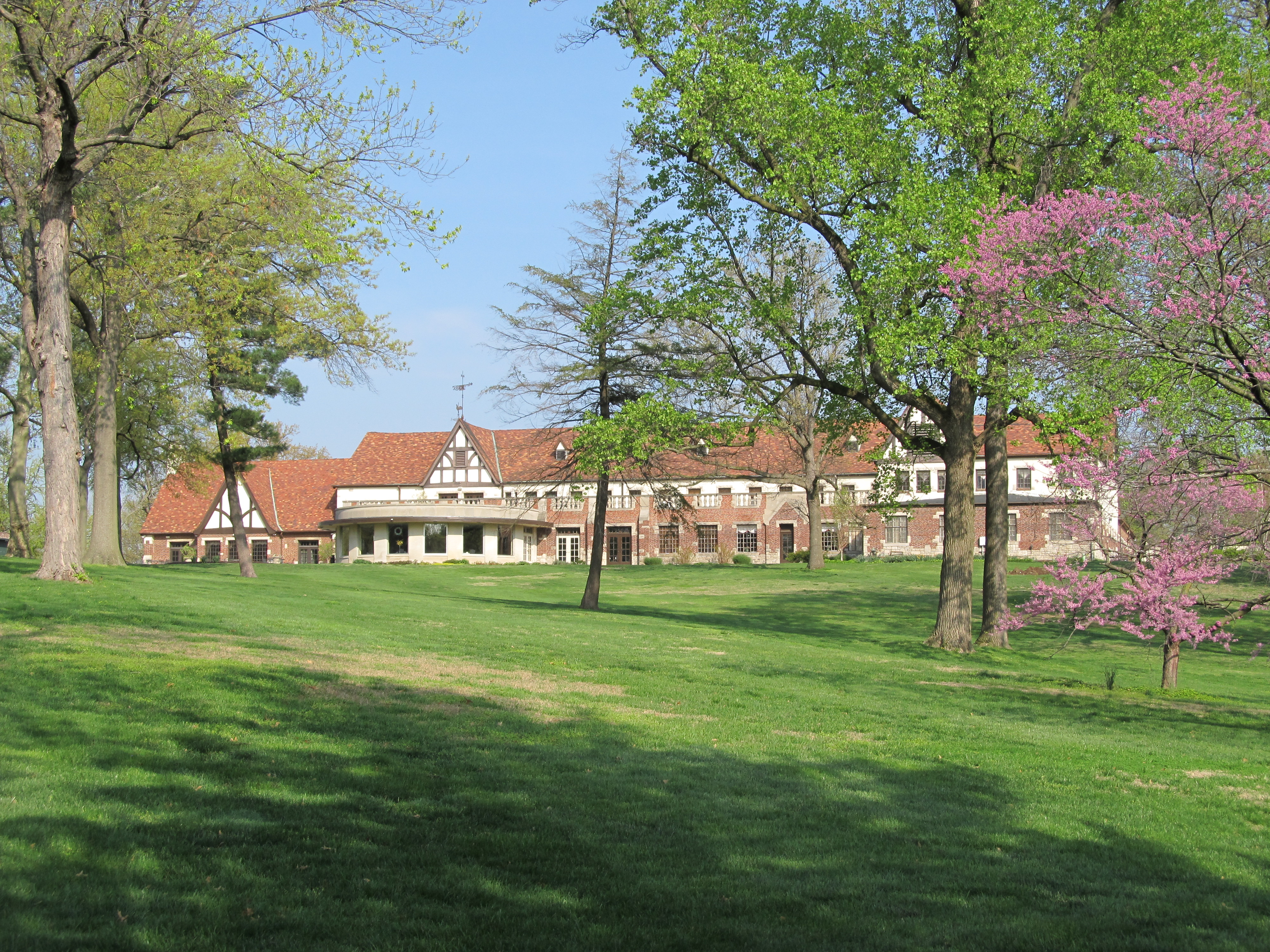
Glen Echo Country Club hosted golf at the 1904 Summer Olympics in St. Louis.

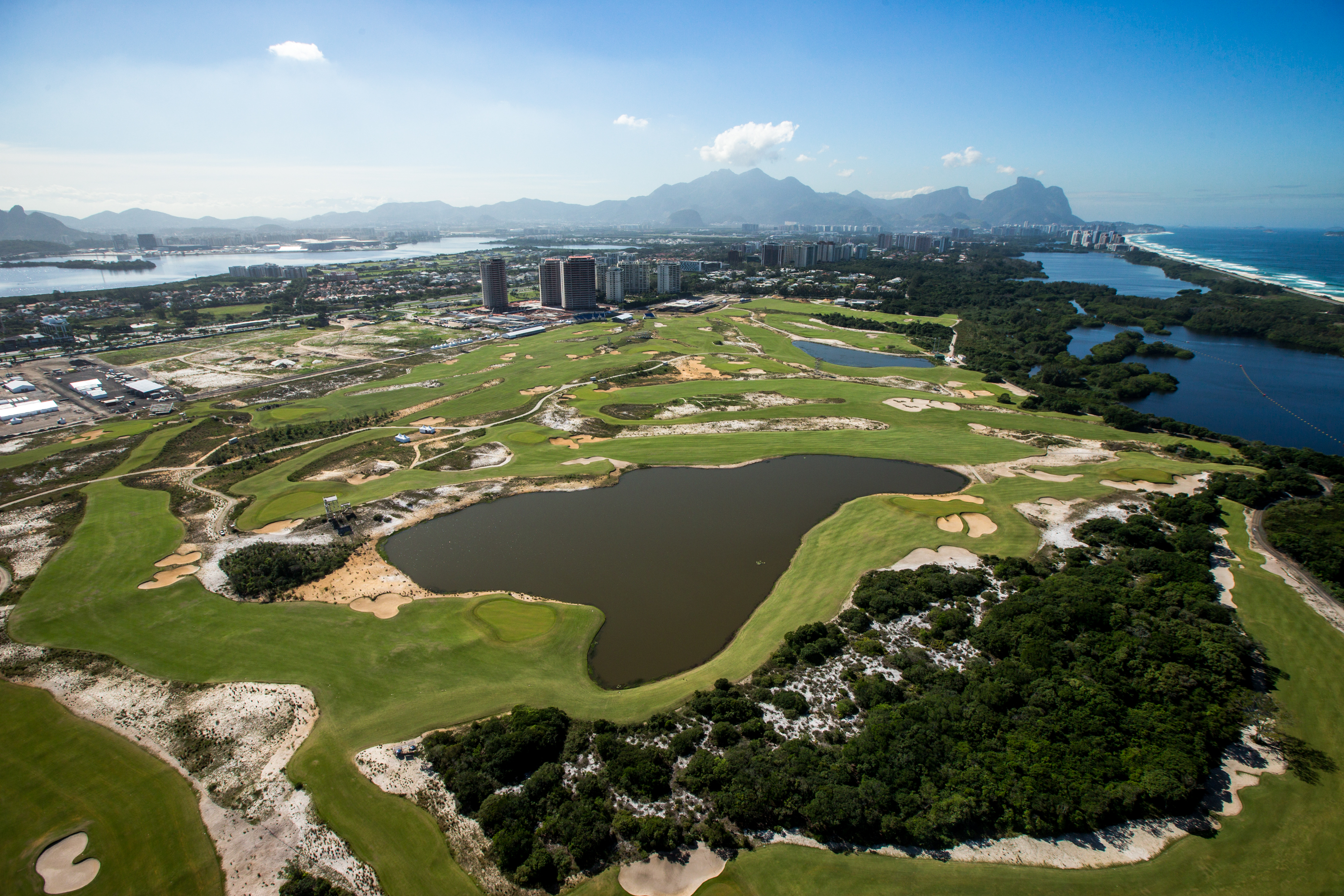
Campo Olímpico de Golfe hosted golf at the 2016 Summer Olympics in Rio de Janeiro.

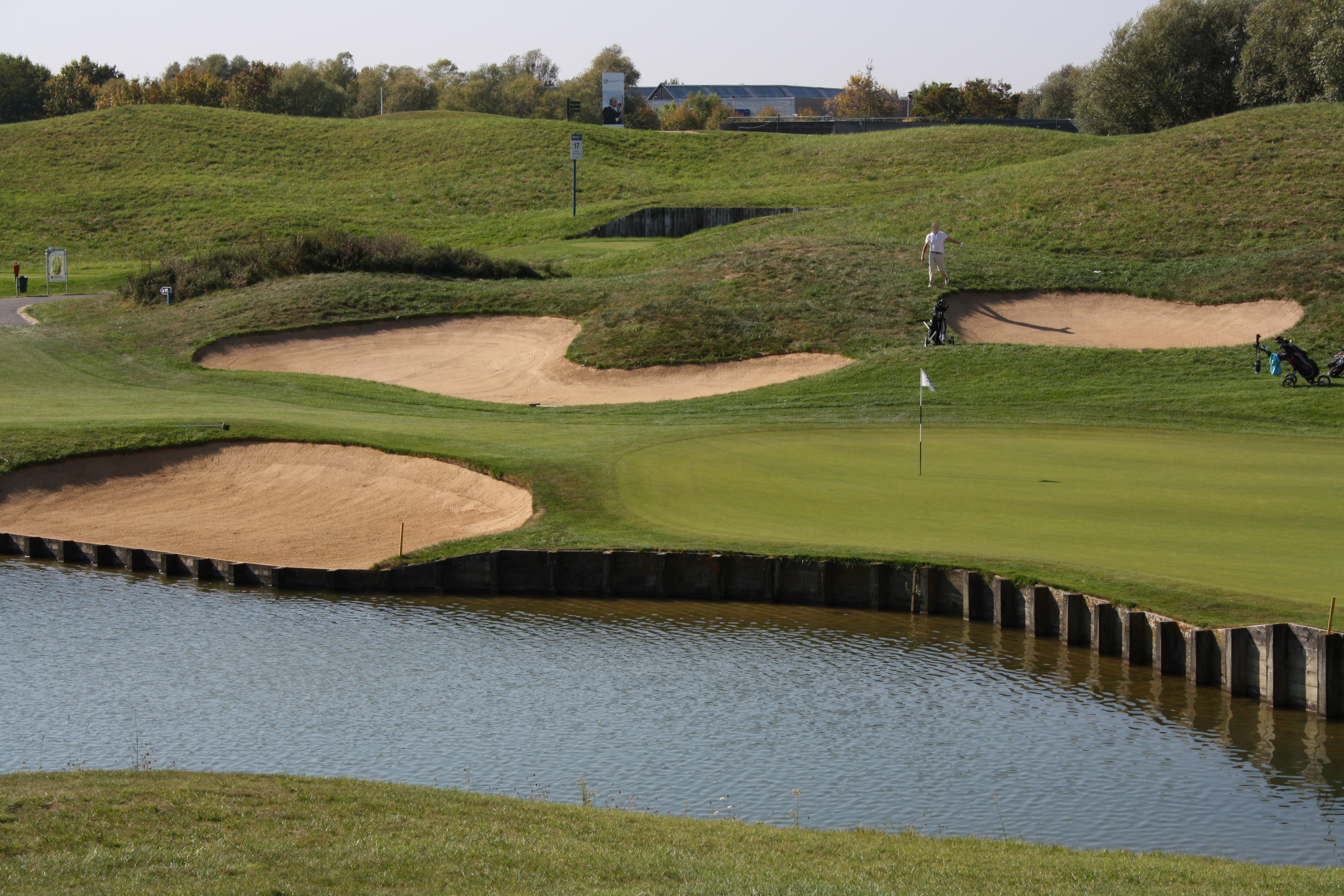
Le Golf National hosted golf at the 2024 Summer Olympics in Paris.

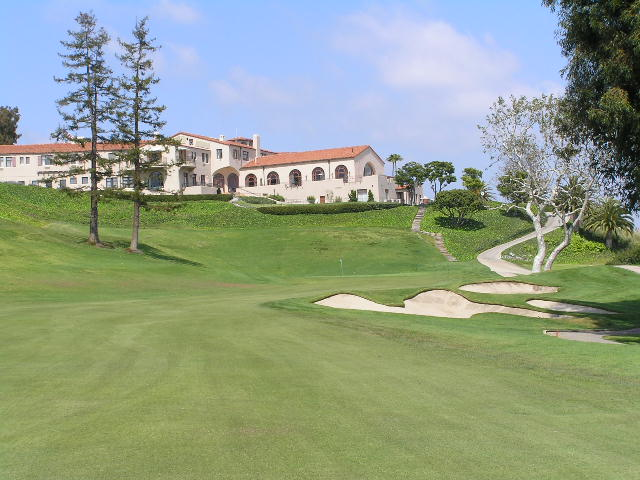
The Riviera Country Club will host golf at the 2028 Summer Olympics in Los Angeles.
