= List of Olympic venues in snowboarding =

For the Winter Olympics there are currently eight venues that have been designated for snowboarding competitions.

Games	Venue	Other sports hosted at venue for those games	Capacity	Ref.
1998 Nagano	Kanbayashi Snowboard Park (halfpipe)	None	10,000	
1998 Nagano	Mount Yakebitai (giant slalom)	Alpine skiing (slalom)	20,000	
2002 Salt Lake City	Park City Mountain Resort	Alpine skiing (giant slalom)	16,000	
2006 Turin	Bardonecchia	None	6,763	
2010 Vancouver	Cypress Mountain	Freestyle skiing	8,000	
2014 Sochi	Freestyle Skiing Center and Snowboard Park	Freestyle skiing	8,000	
2018 PyeongChang	Phoenix Snow Park	Freestyle skiing	18,000	
2018 PyeongChang	Alpensia Ski Jumping Centre (big air)	Ski jumping, Nordic combined (ski jumping)	8,500 (including 2,200 standing)	
2022 Beijing	Genting Snow Park	Freestyle skiing	Not listed.	
2022 Beijing	Big Air Shougang (big air)	None	4,912	
2026 Milan-Cortina	Mottolino/Sitas-Tagliede/Carosello 3000	Freestyle skiing	Not listed.	
2030 French Alps	Briançon (halfpipe)	Freestyle skiing	3,500-5,000	
2030 French Alps	Montgenèvre (big air, slopestyle, giant slalom)	Freestyle skiing	3,500-5,000	
2030 French Alps	TBA (cross)	Freestyle skiing	Not listed.	
2034 Utah	Utah Olympic Park (cross, giant slalom)	Freestyle skiing	8,000	
2034 Utah	Park City (halfpipe, slopestyle)	Freestyle skiing	15,000	
2034 Utah	Olympic Medals Plaza (big air)	Freestyle skiing	25,000	

== Gallery of venues ==
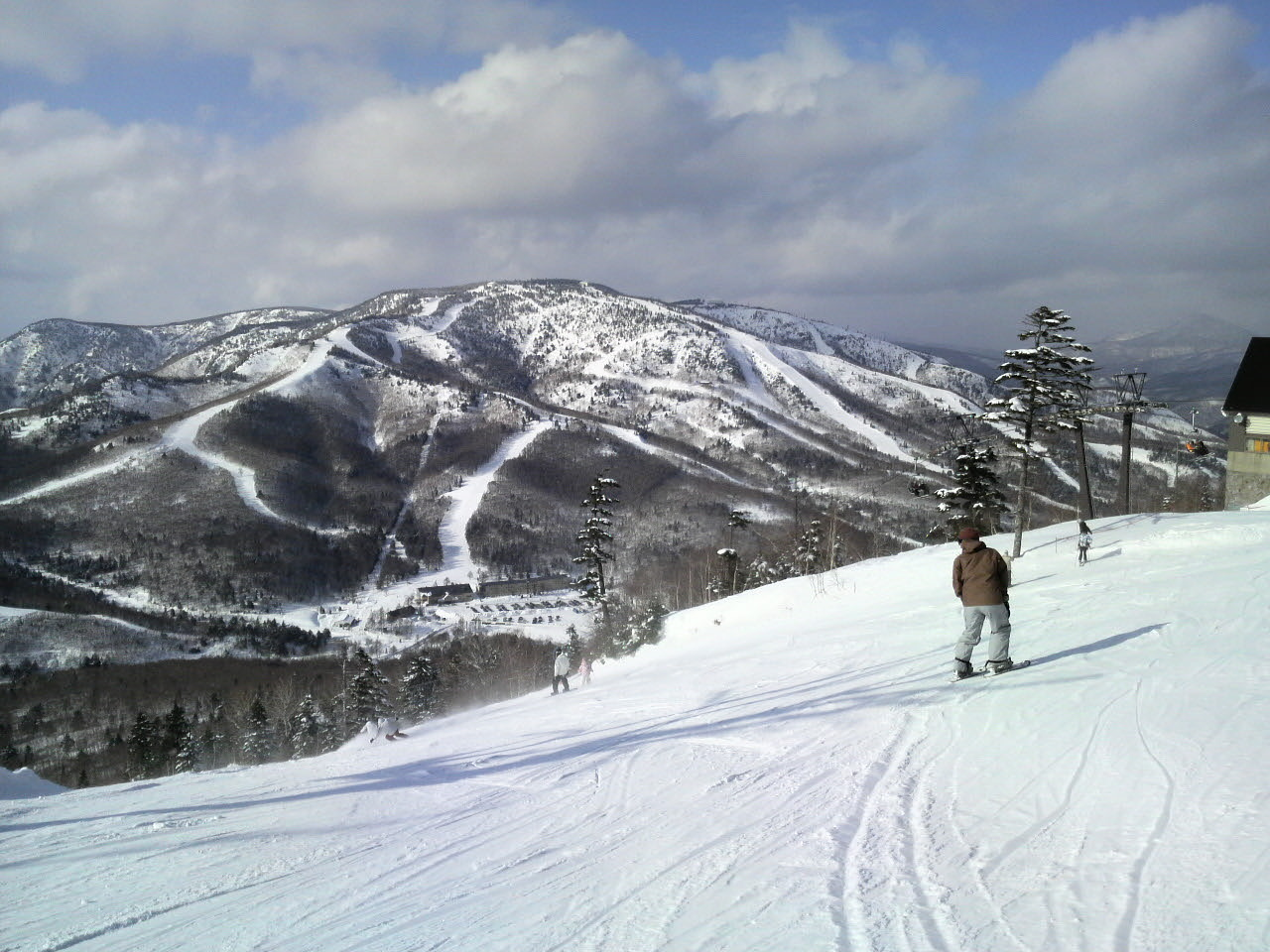
Mount Yakebitai hosted giant slalom at the 1998 Winter Olympics in Nagano.

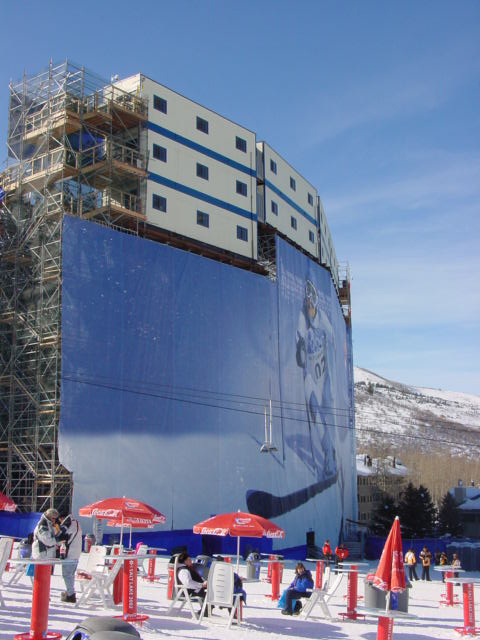
Park City Mountain Resort hosted snowboarding at the 2002 Winter Olympics in Salt Lake City and will do so again in 2034.

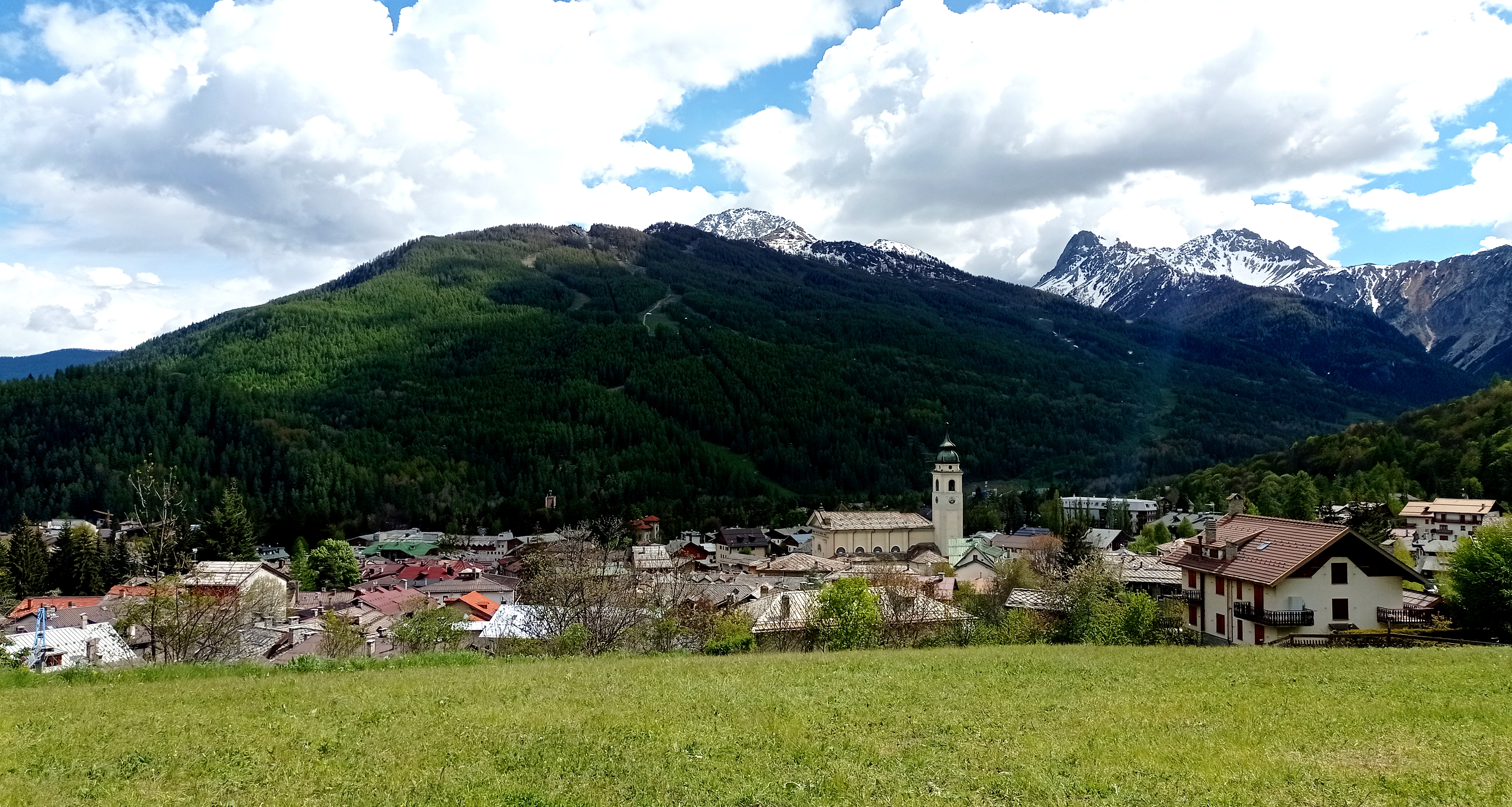
Bardonecchia hosted snowboarding at the 2006 Winter Olympics in Turin.

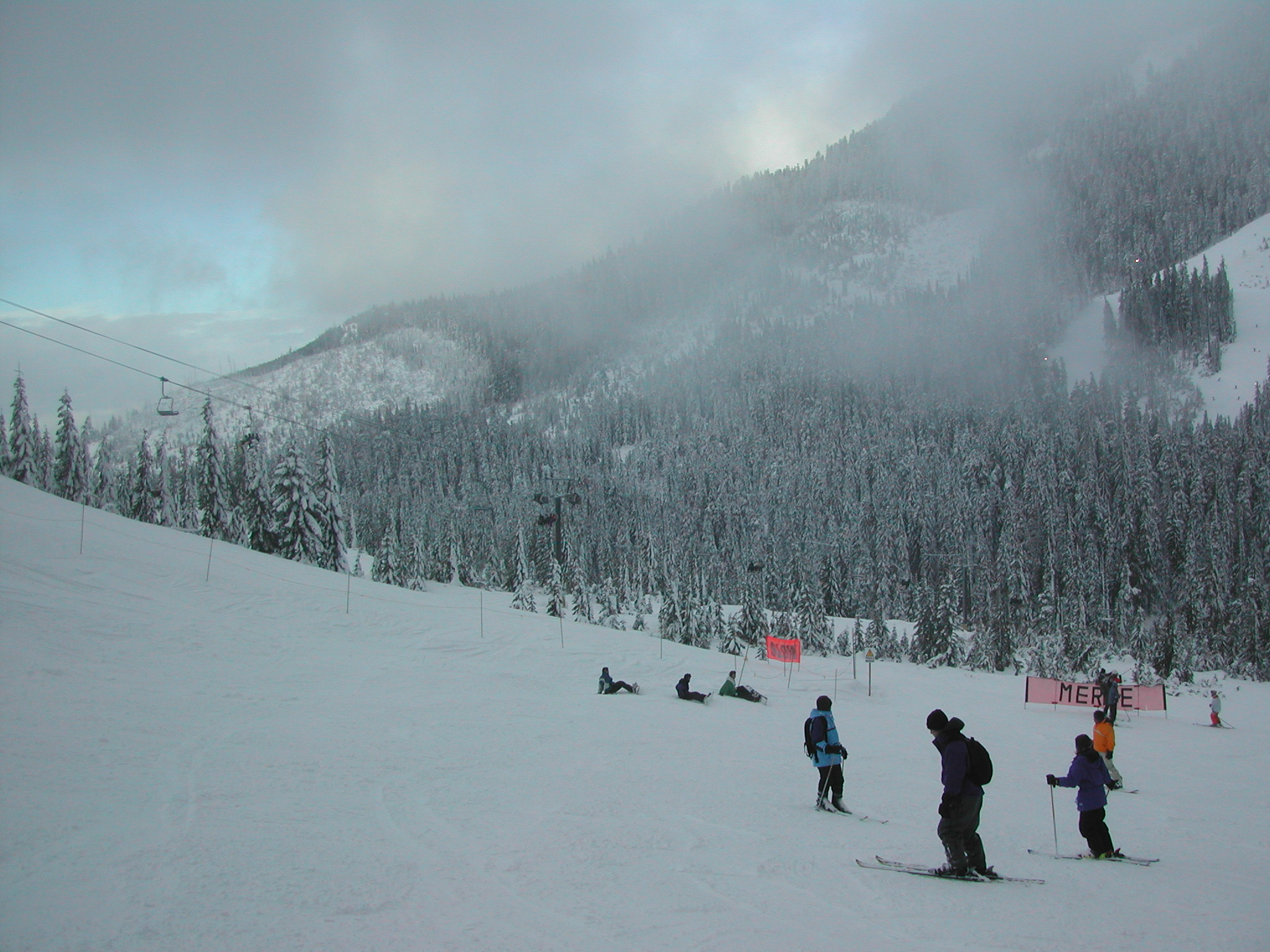
Cypress Mountain hosted snowboarding at the 2010 Winter Olympics in Vancouver.

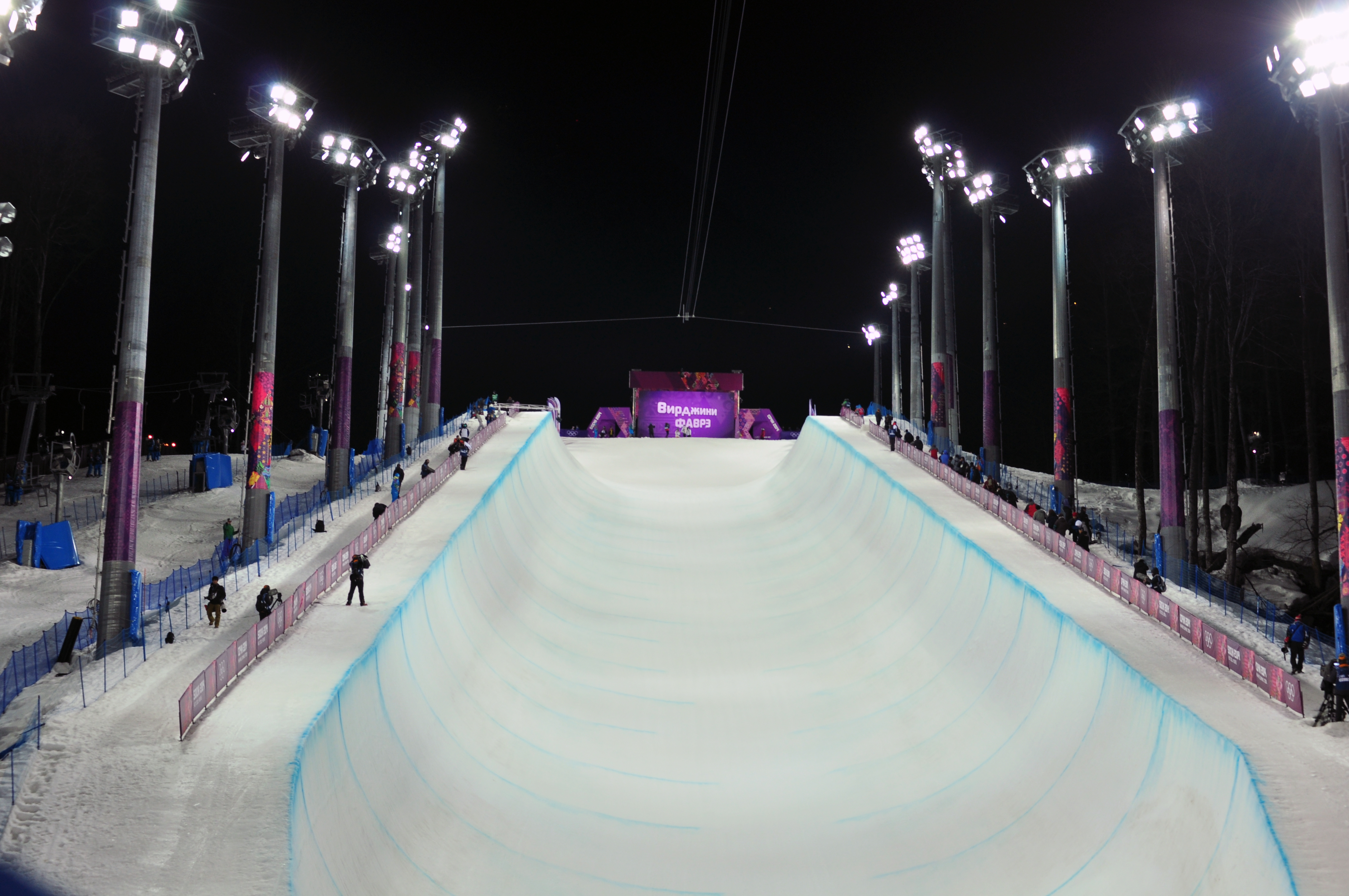
Rosa Khutor Extreme Park hosted snowboarding at the 2014 Winter Olympics in Sochi.

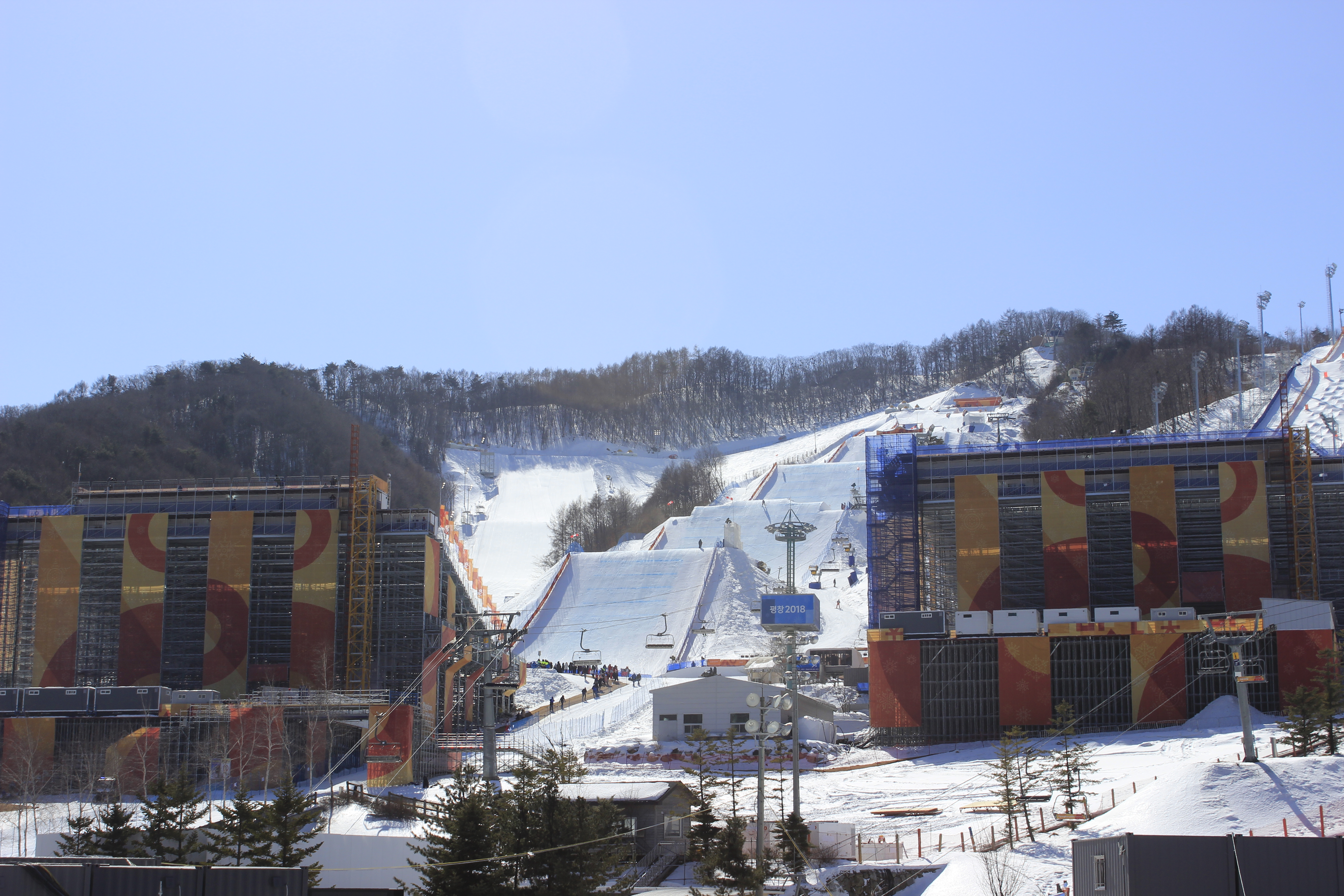
Phoenix Snow Park hosted snowboarding at the 2018 Winter Olympics in Pyeongchang.

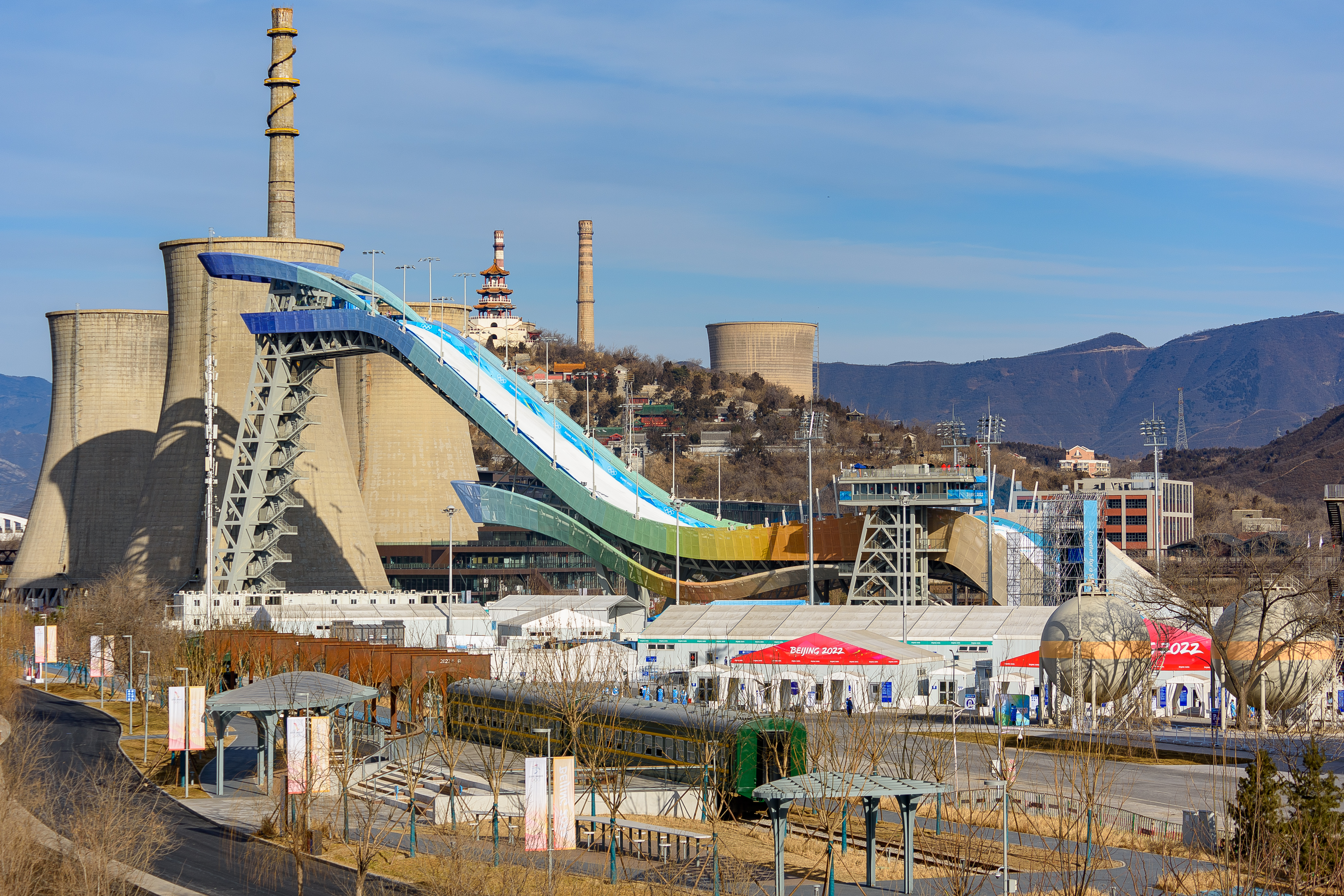
Big Air Shougang hosted big air at the 2022 Winter Olympics in Beijing.

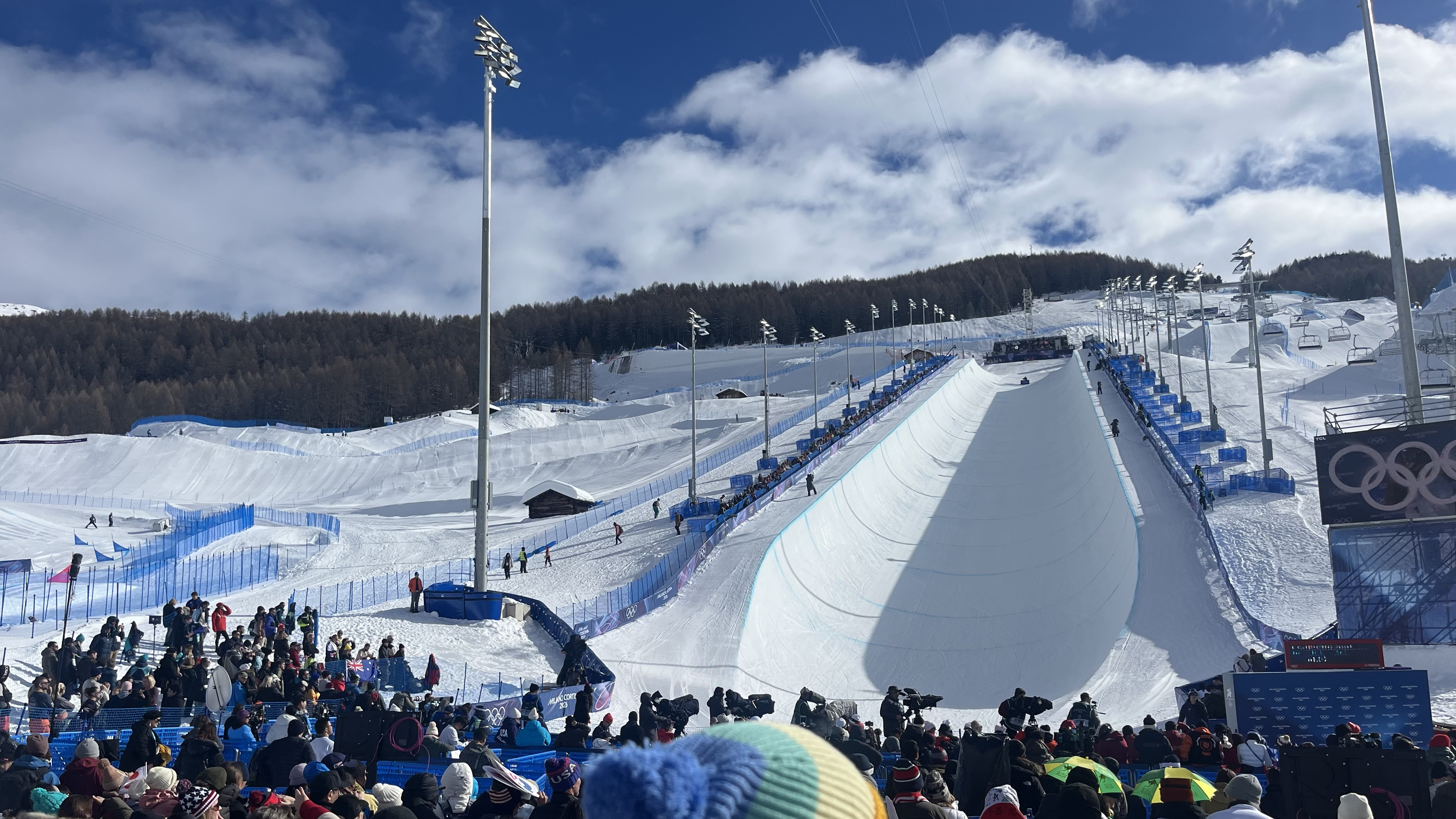
Livigno hosted snowboarding for the 2026 Winter Olympics in Milan.

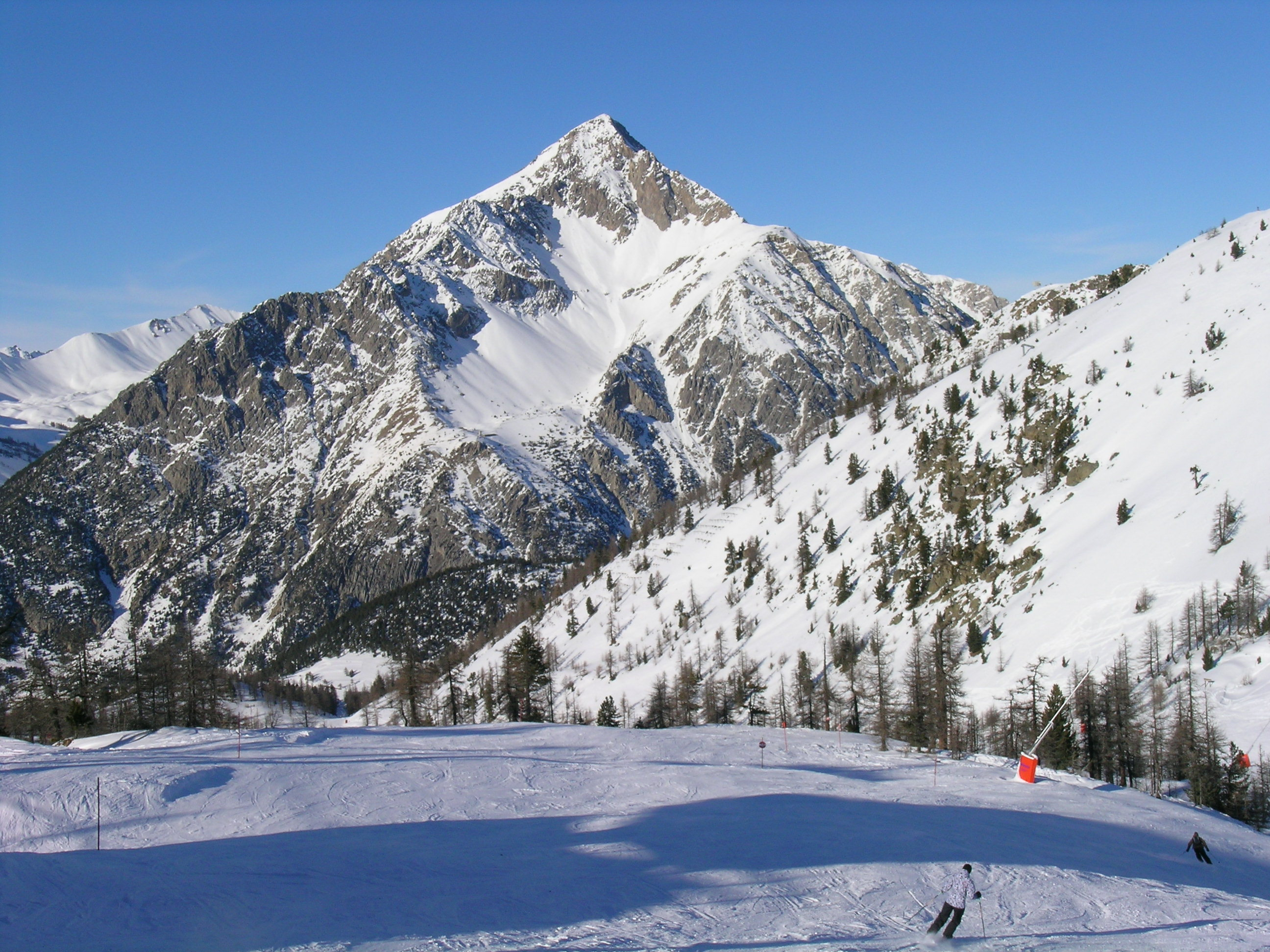
Montgenèvre will host big air, slopestyle and giant slalom at the 2030 Winter Olympics in the French Alps.
