= List of Olympic venues in taekwondo =

For the Summer Olympics, there have been seven venues that have been or be used to host taekwondo.

Games	Venue	Other sports hosted at venue for those games	Capacity	Ref.
1988 Seoul	Jangchung Gymnasium (demonstration)	Judo	7,000	
1992 Barcelona	Palau Blaugrana (demonstration)	Judo, Roller hockey (demonstration final)	6,400	
2000 Sydney	State Sports Centre	Table tennis	5,006	
2004 Athens	Faliro Sports Pavilion Arena	Handball	10,000	
2008 Beijing	Beijing Science and Technology University Gymnasium	Judo	8,024	
2012 London	ExCeL	Boxing, Fencing, Judo, Table tennis, Weightlifting, Wrestling	Not listed.	
2016 Rio de Janeiro	Carioca Arena 3	Fencing	10,000	
2020 Tokyo	Makuhari Messe	Fencing, Wrestling	10,000	
2024 Paris	Grand Palais	Fencing	8,000	
2028 Los Angeles	Los Angeles Convention Center	Basketball, Fencing, Table tennis	7,000	
2032 Brisbane	Brisbane Convention & Exhibition Centre	Badminton, Fencing, Table tennis	6,000	

== Gallery of venues ==
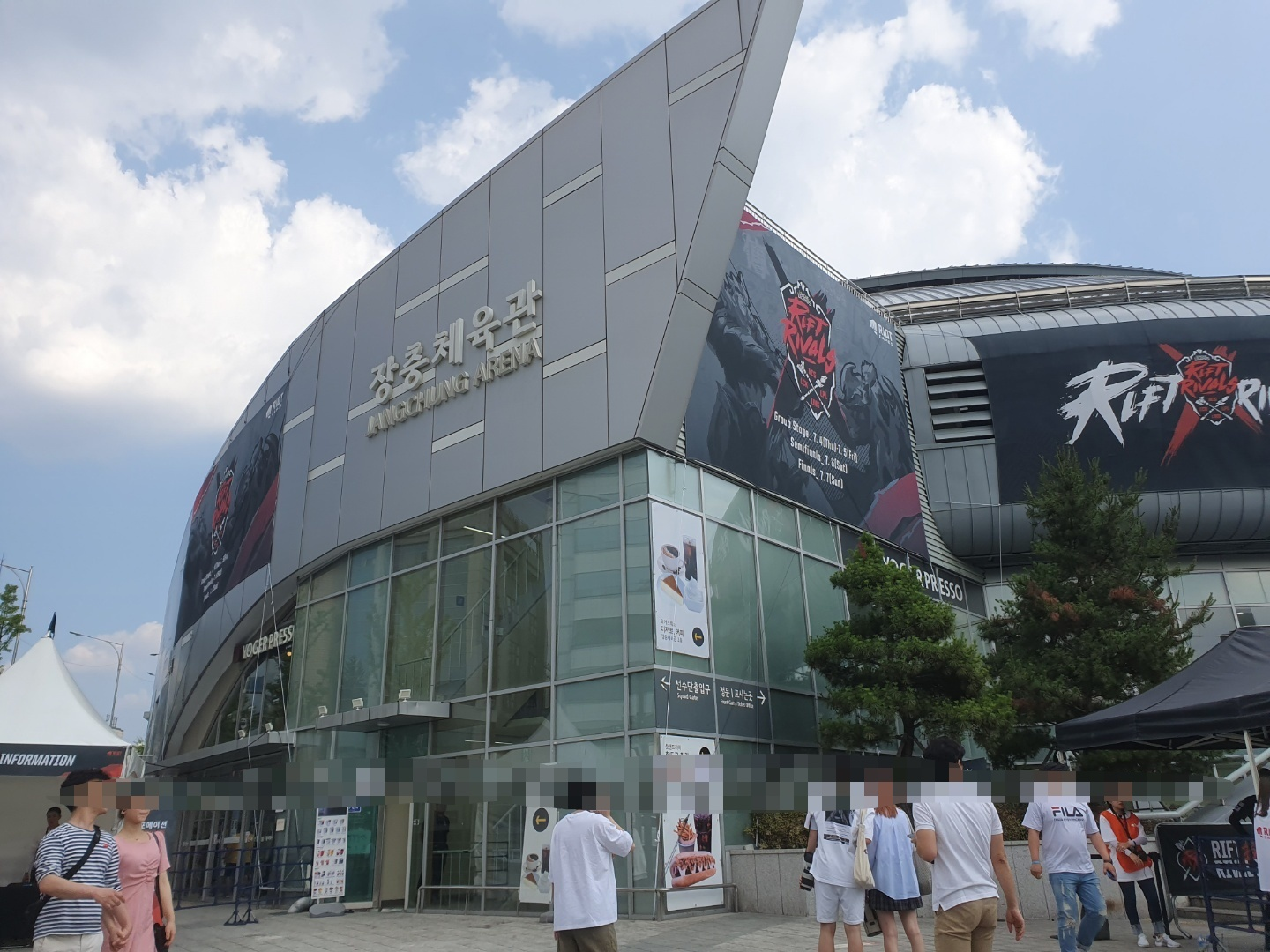
Jangchung Arena hosted taekwondo at the 1988 Summer Olympics in Seoul.

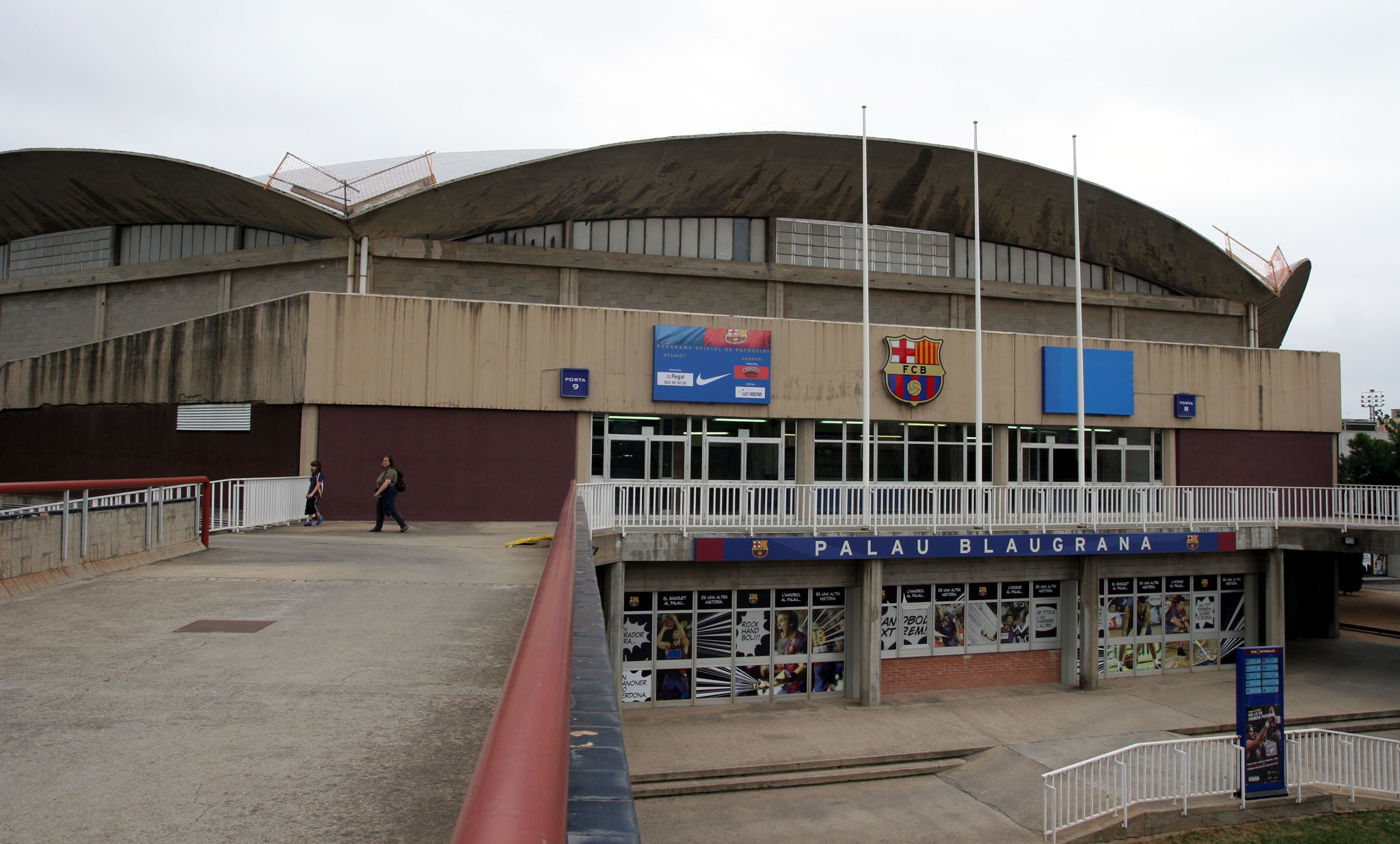
Palau Blaugrana hosted taekwondo at the 1992 Summer Olympics in Barcelona.

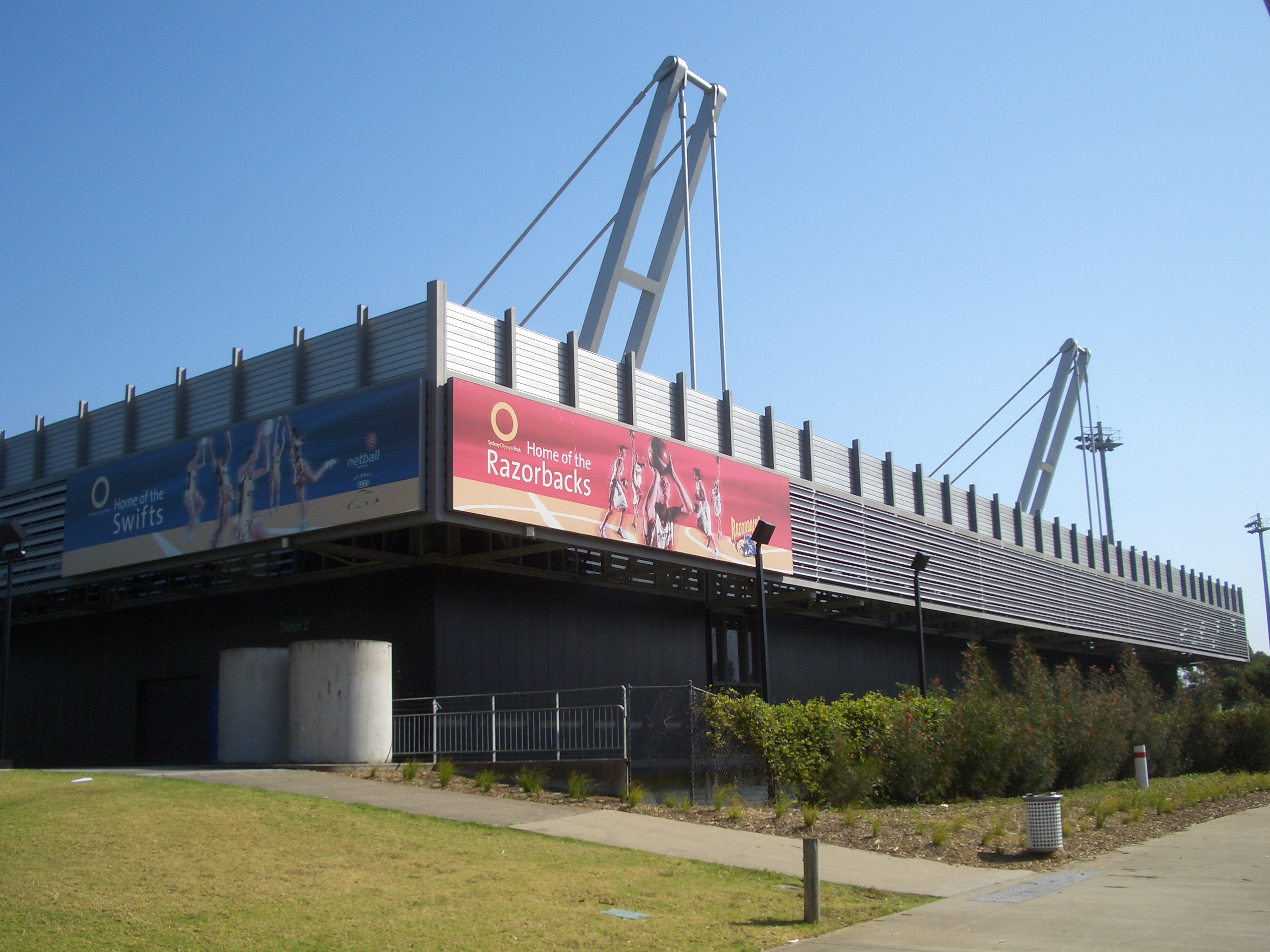
State Sports Centre hosted taekwondo at the 2000 Summer Olympics in Sydney.

Faliro Sports Pavilion Arena hosted taekwondo at the 2004 Summer Olympics in Athens.

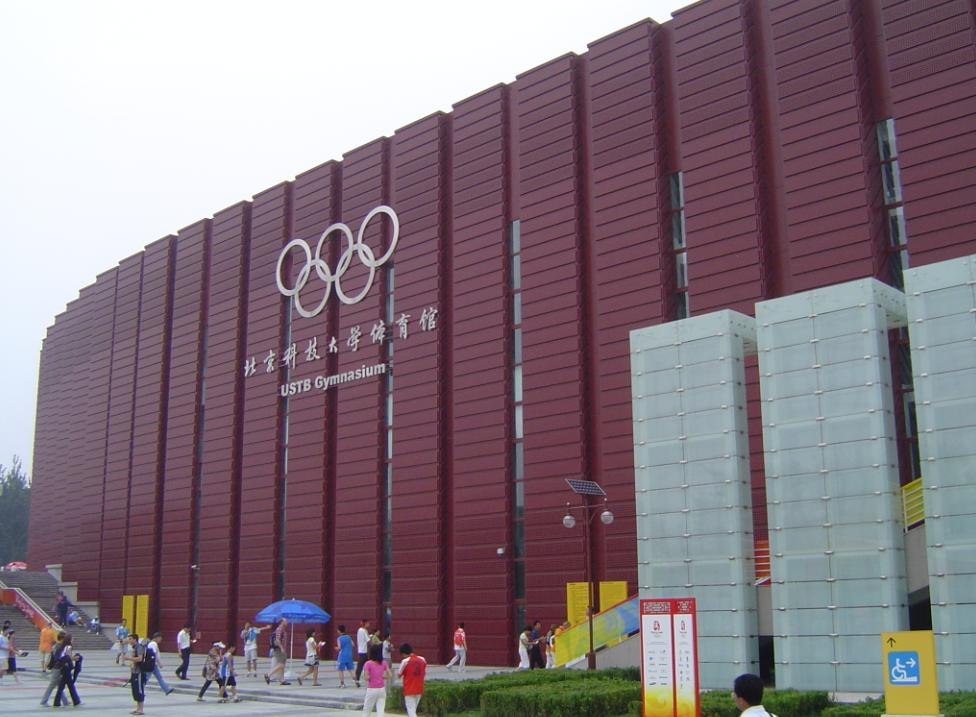
Beijing Science and Technology University Gymnasium hosted taekwondo at the 2008 Summer Olympics.

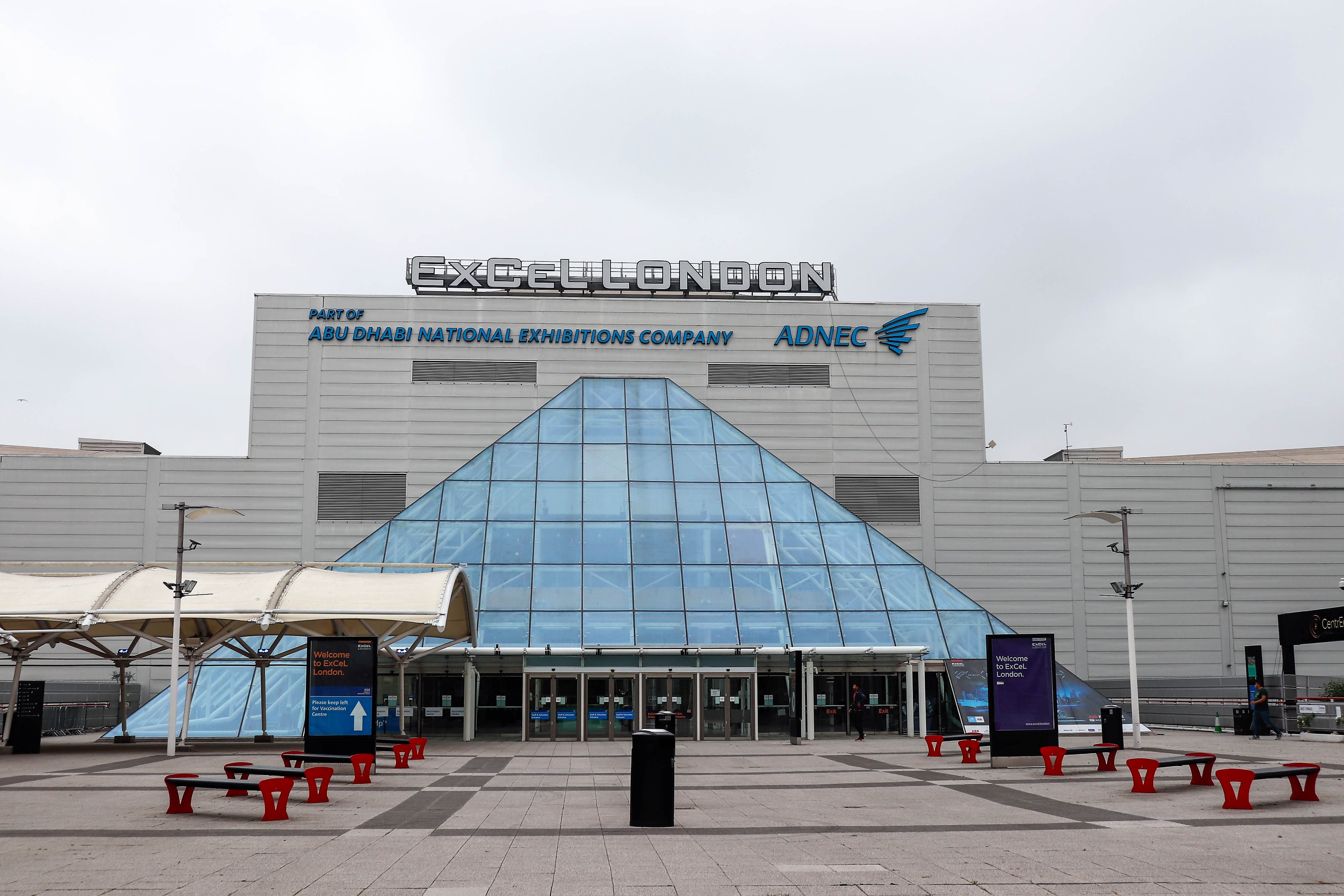
Excel London hosted taekwondo at the 2012 Summer Olympics.

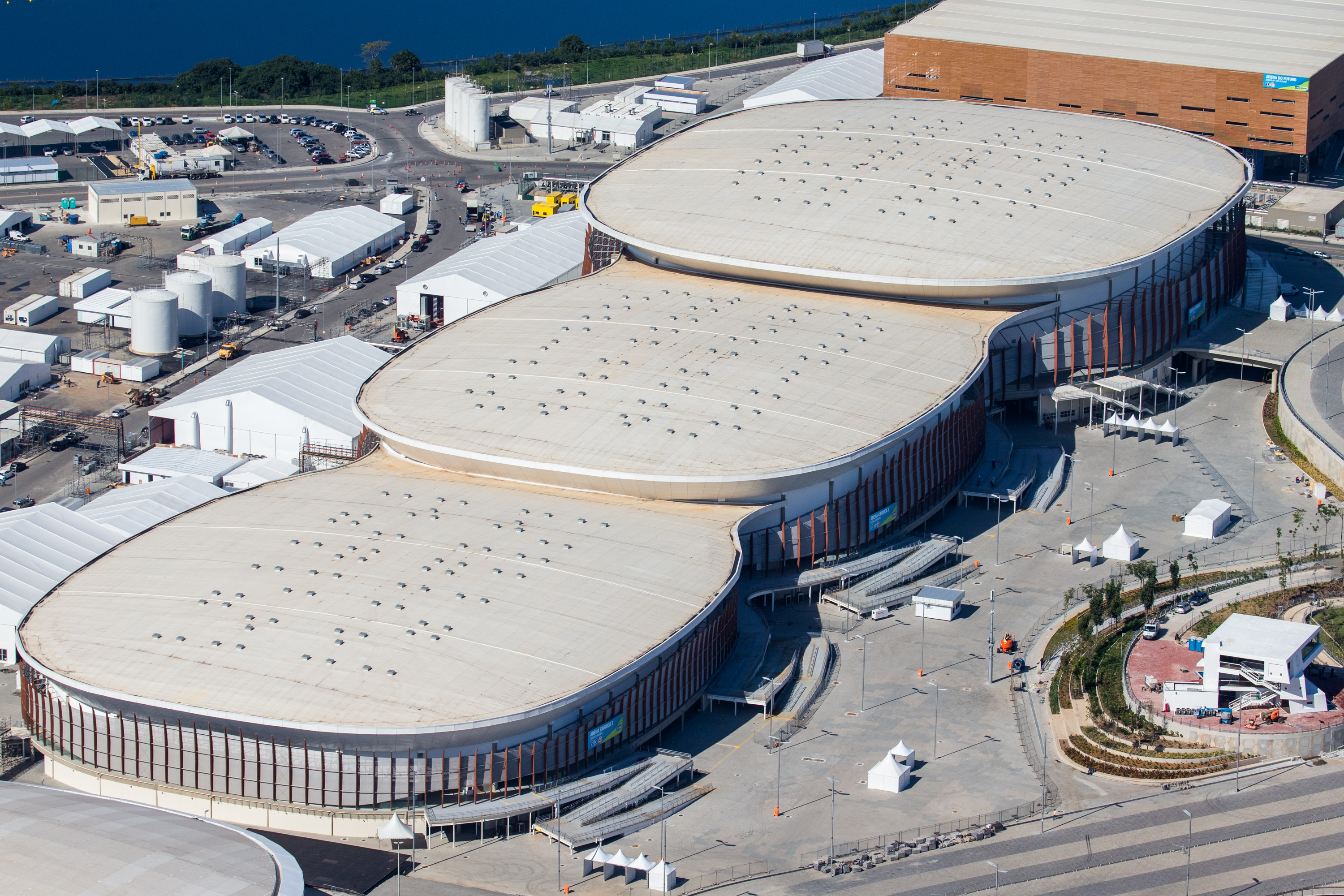
Carioca Arena 3 hosted taekwondo at the 2016 Summer Olympics in Rio de Janeiro.

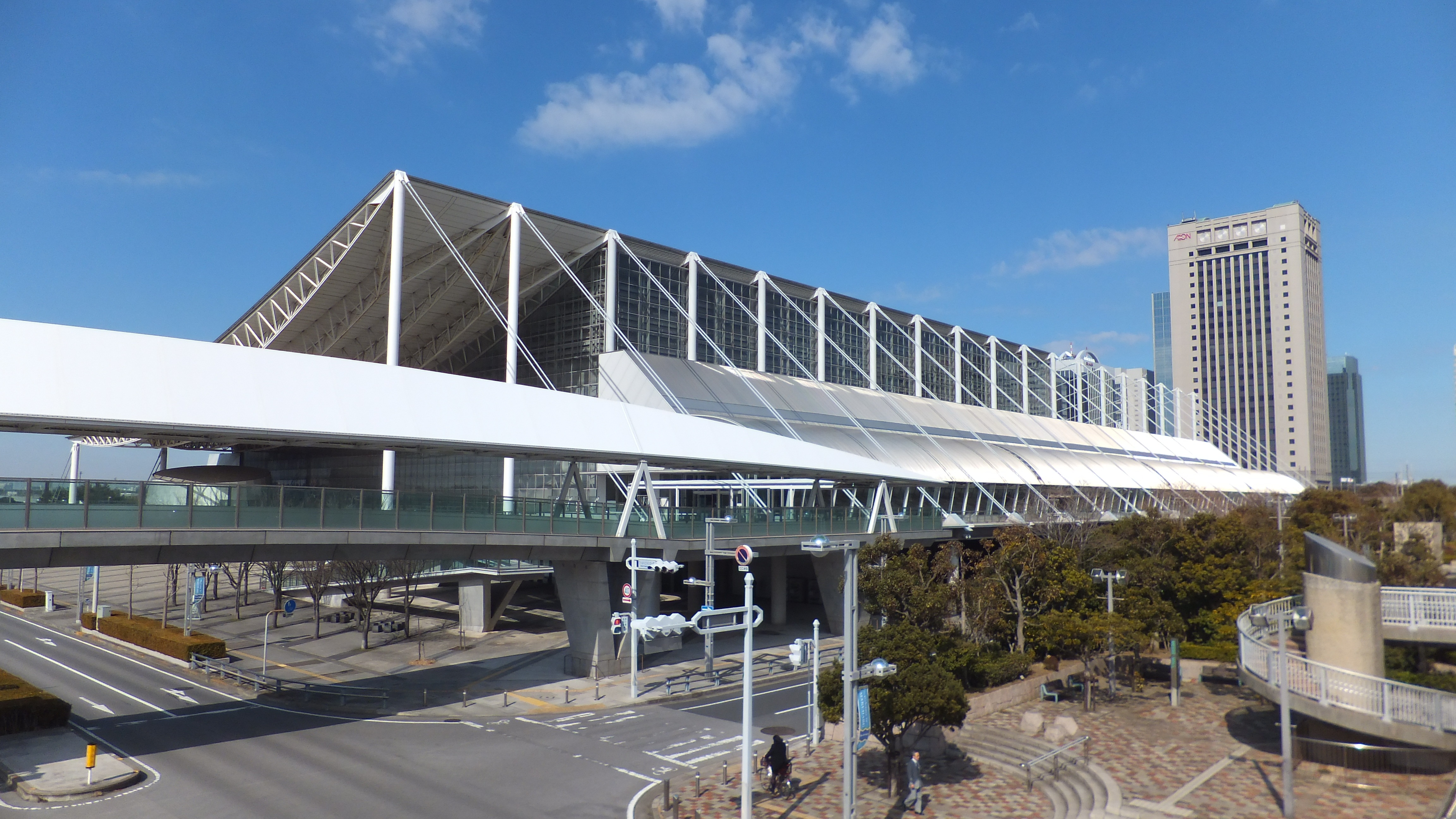
Makuhari Messe hosted taekwondo at the 2020 Summer Olympics in Tokyo.

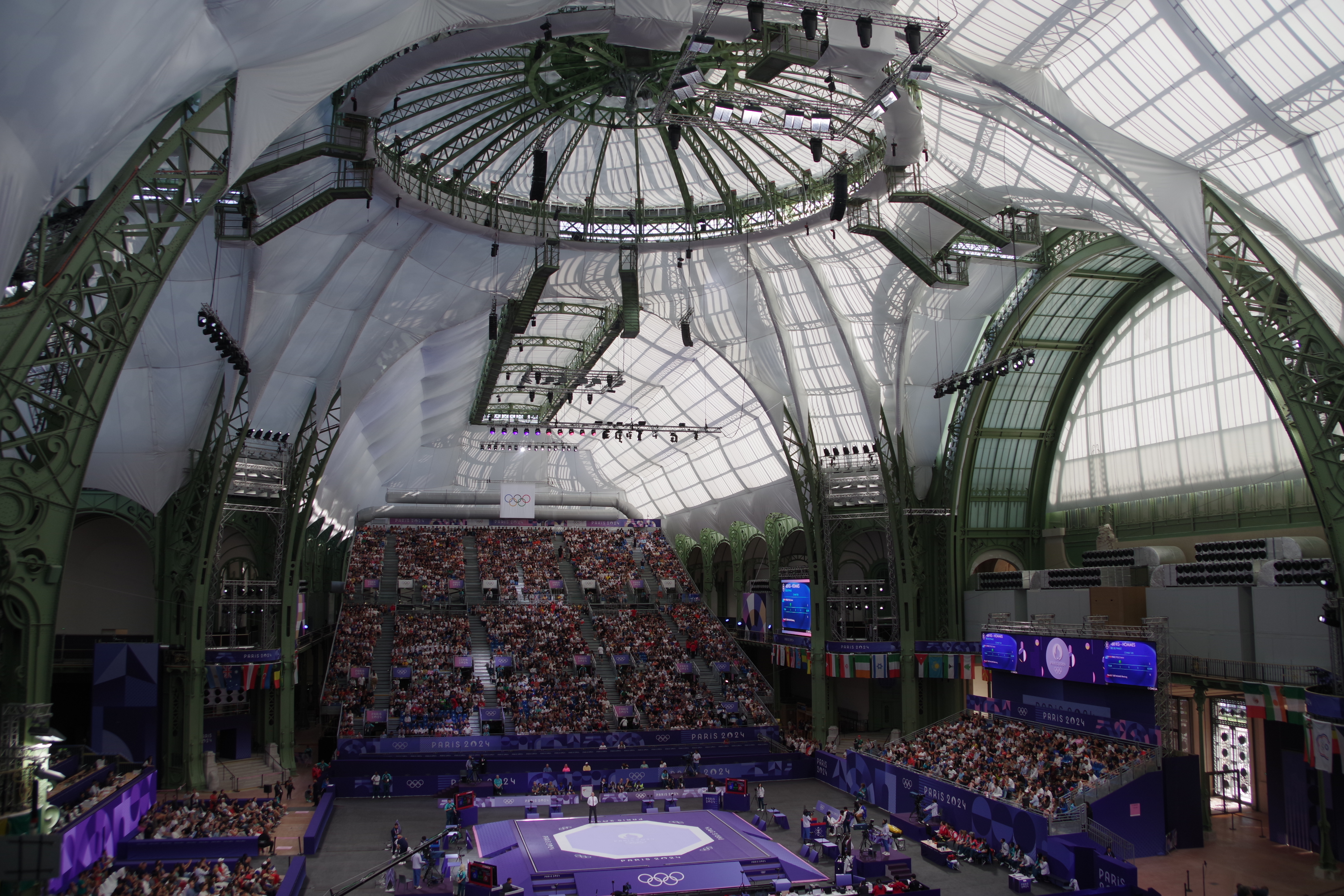
Grand Palais hosted taekwondo at the 2024 Summer Olympics in Paris.

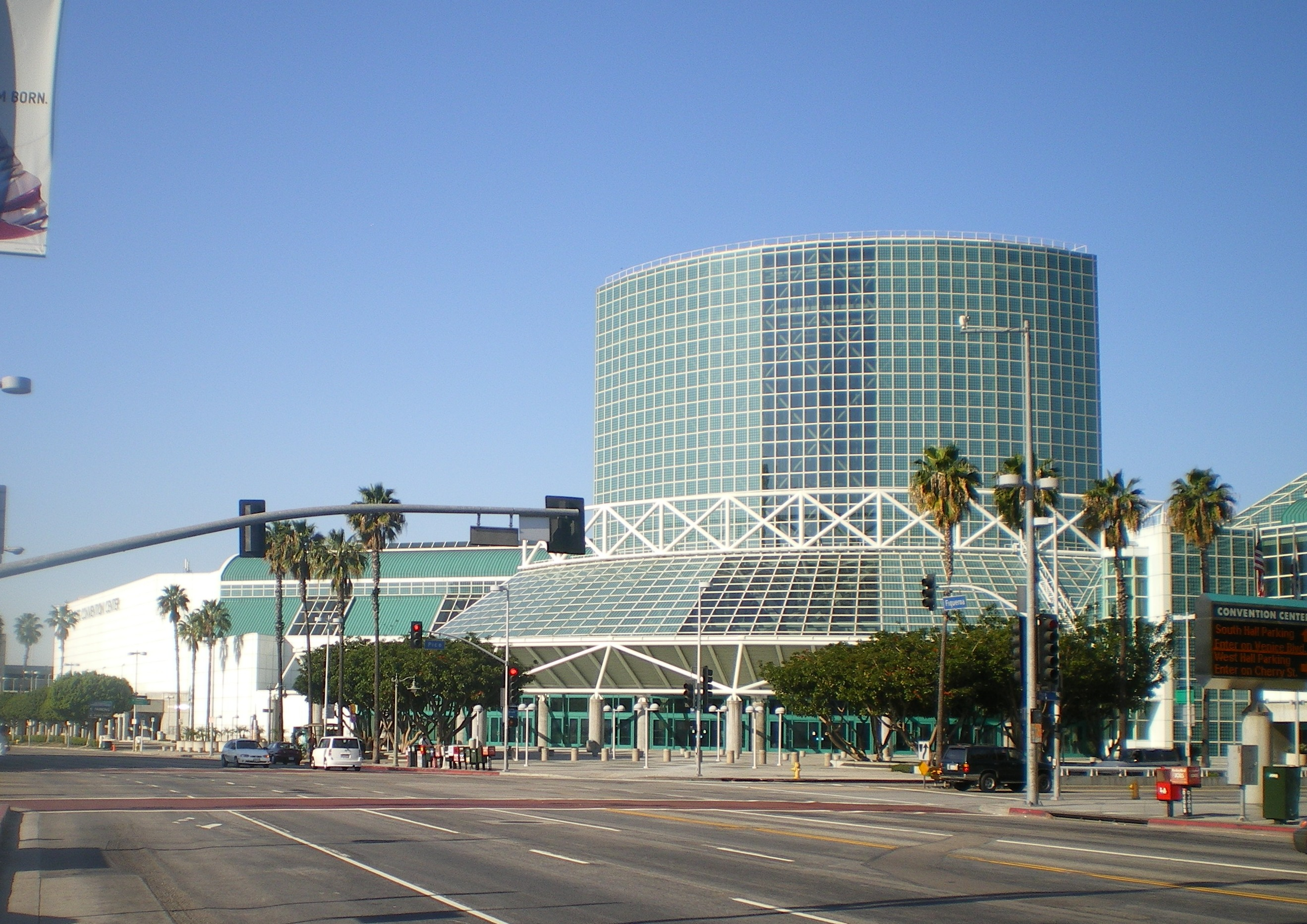
The Los Angeles Convention Center will host taekwondo at the 2028 Summer Olympics.
