= List of Olympic venues in triathlon =

Since its debut at the 2000 Summer Olympics, the triathlon has been planned for five different venues.

Games	Venue	Other sports hosted at venues for those games	Capacity	Ref.
2000 Sydney	Sydney Opera House	None	Not listed.	
2004 Athens	Vouliagmeni Olympic Centre	Cycling (individual time trial)	Not listed.	
2008 Beijing	Triathlon Venue	None	10,000	
2012 London	Hyde Park	Swimming (marathon)	3,000	
2016 Rio de Janeiro	Fort Copacabana	Cycling (road), Swimming (marathon)	5,000	
2020 Tokyo	Odaiba Marine Park	Swimming (marathon)	5,000	
2024 Paris	Pont Alexandre III	Cycling (road time trial finish), Swimming (marathon)	1,000	
2028 Los Angeles	Venice Beach	Cycling, Marathon	2,000	
2032 Brisbane	Southport Broadwater Parklands	Swimming (marathon)	5,000	

== Gallery of venues ==
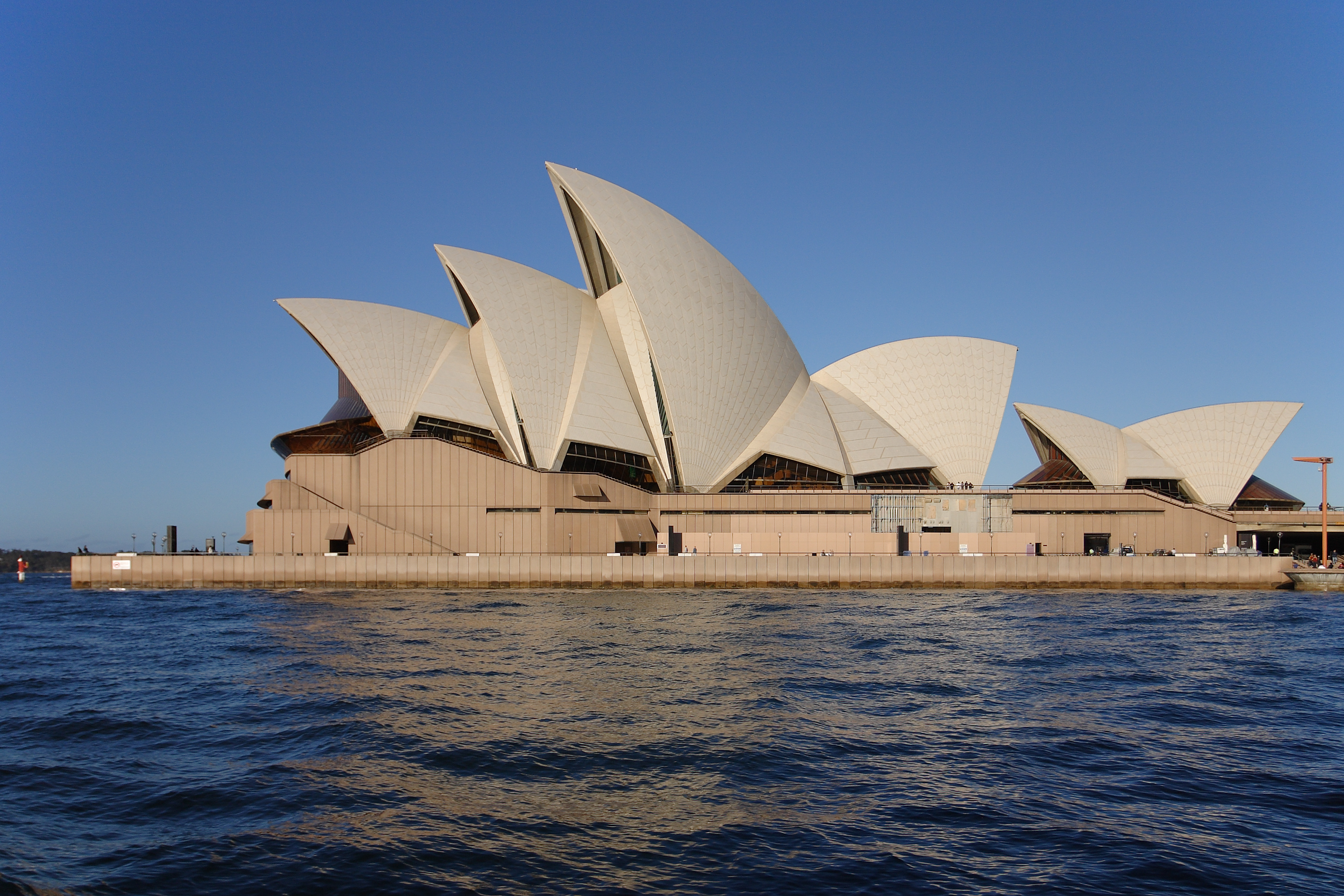
The Sydney Opera House hosted the first Olympic triathlon competition at the 2000 Summer Olympics.

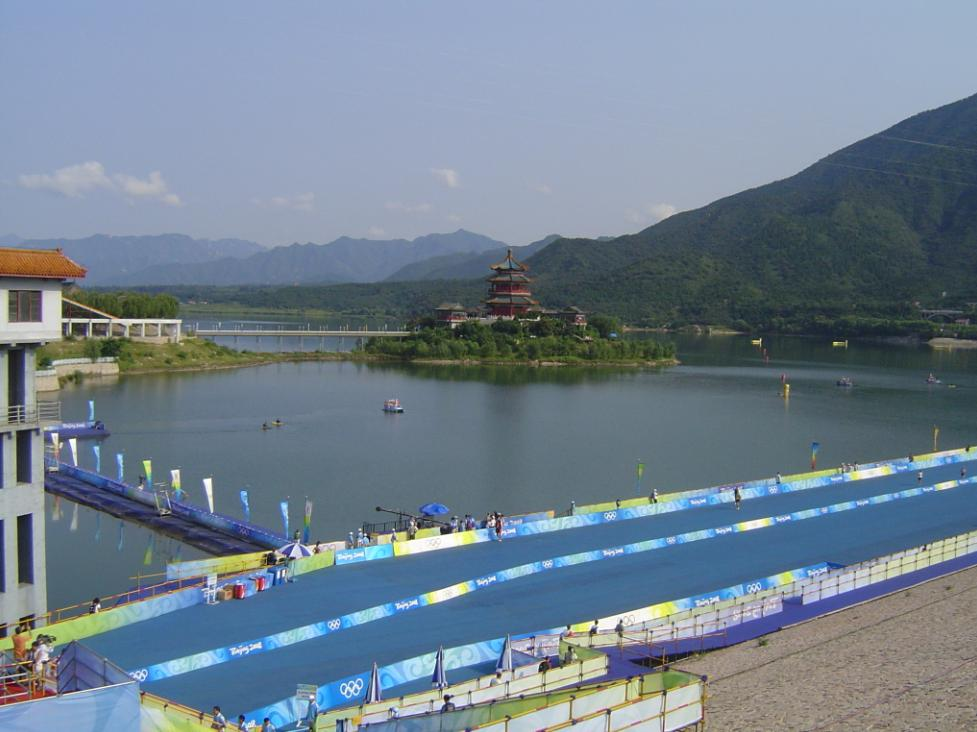
Ming Tombs Reservoir hosted triathlon at the 2008 Summer Olympics in Beijing.

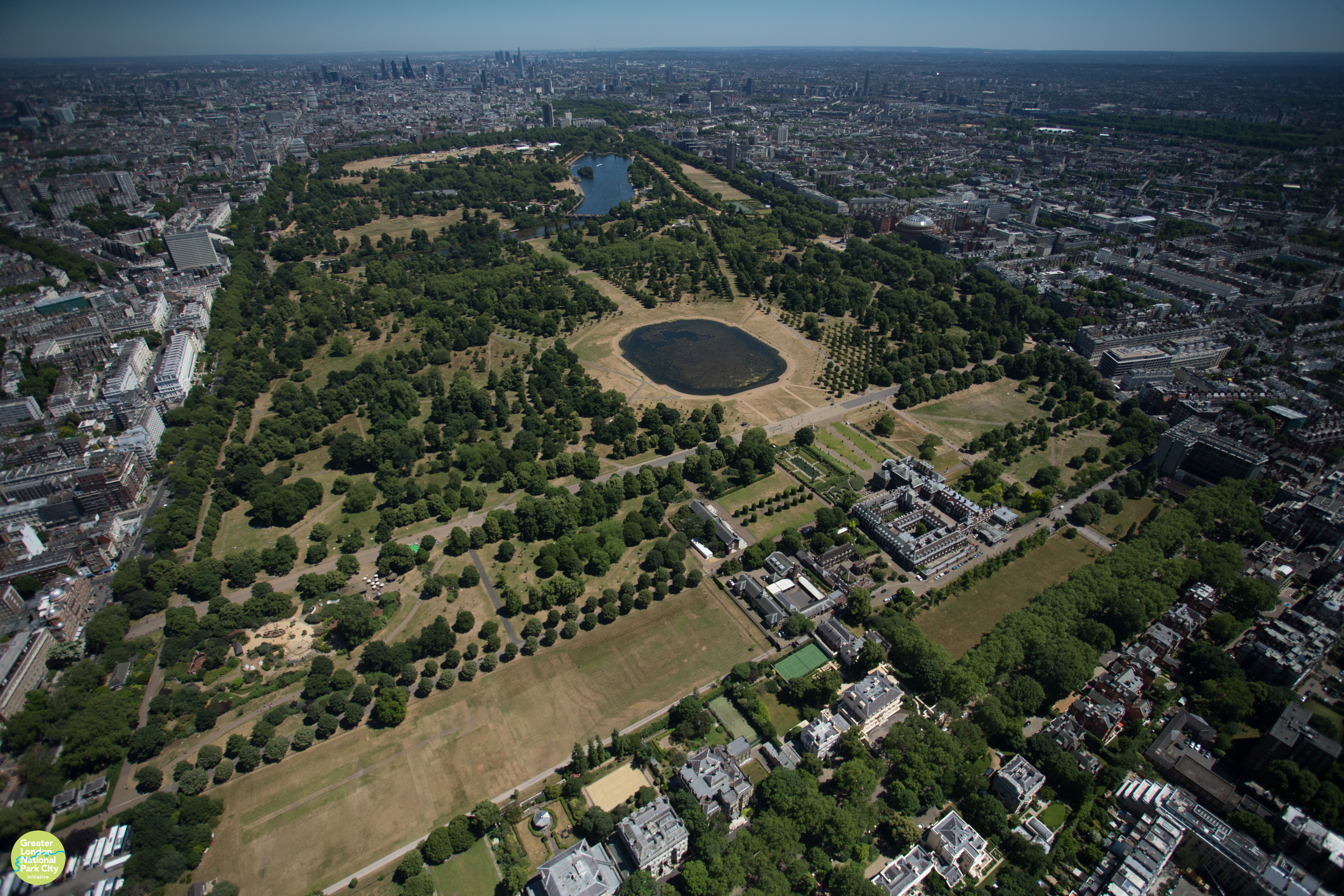
Hyde Park hosted triathlon at the 2012 Summer Olympics in London.

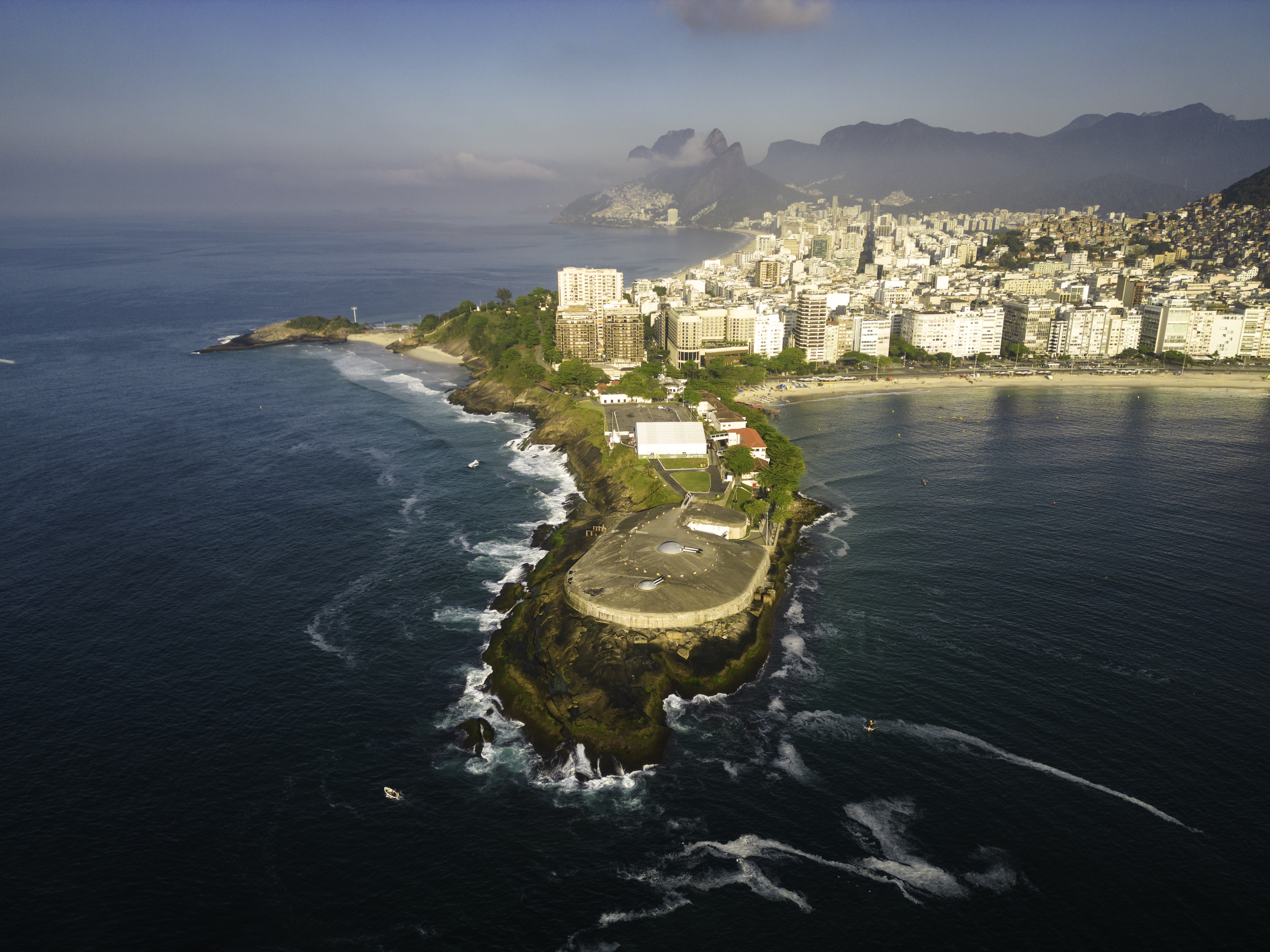
Fort Copacabana hosted triathlon at the 2016 Summer Olympics in Rio de Janeiro.

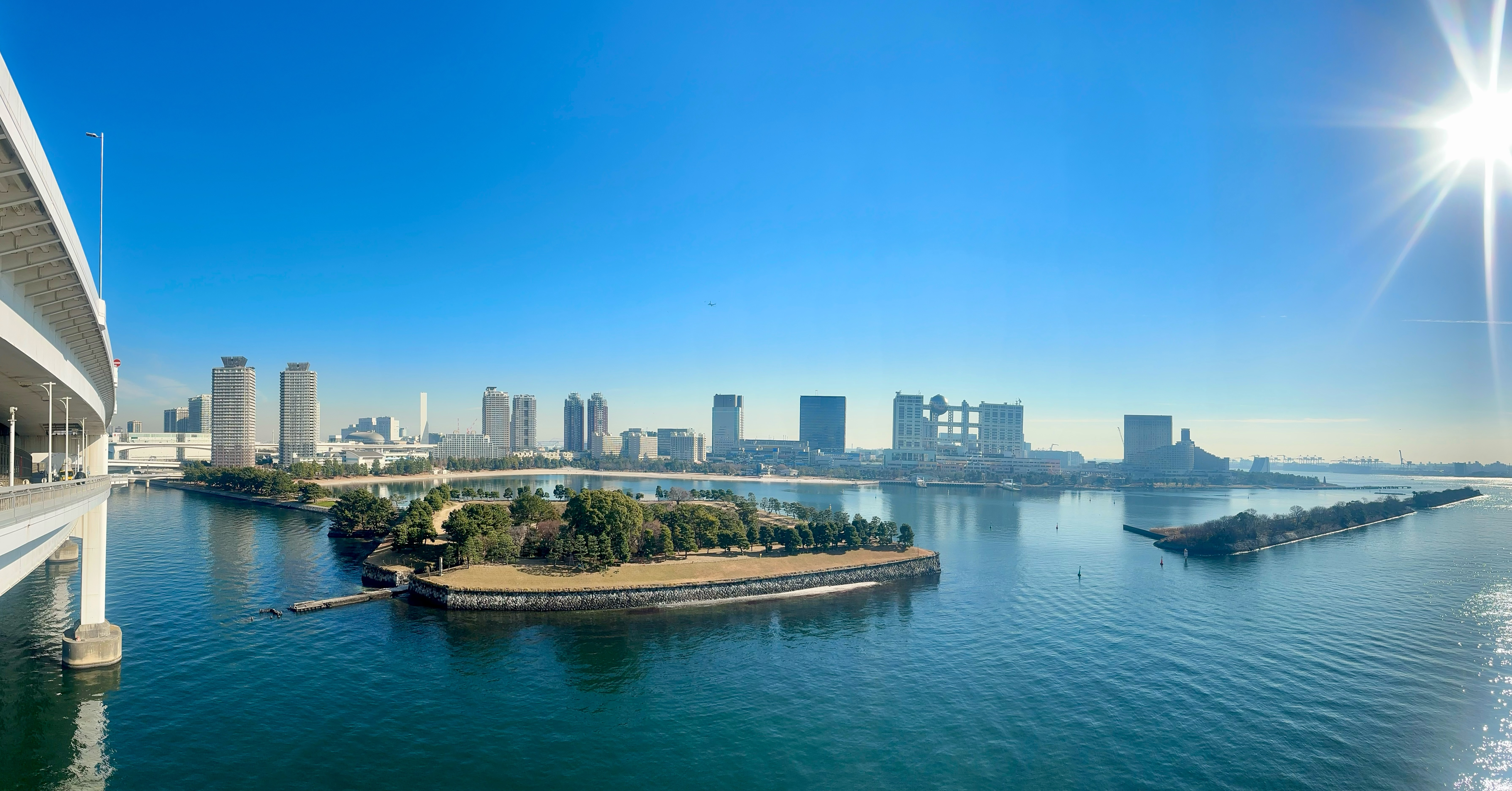
Odaiba hosted triathlon at the 2020 Summer Olympics in Tokyo.

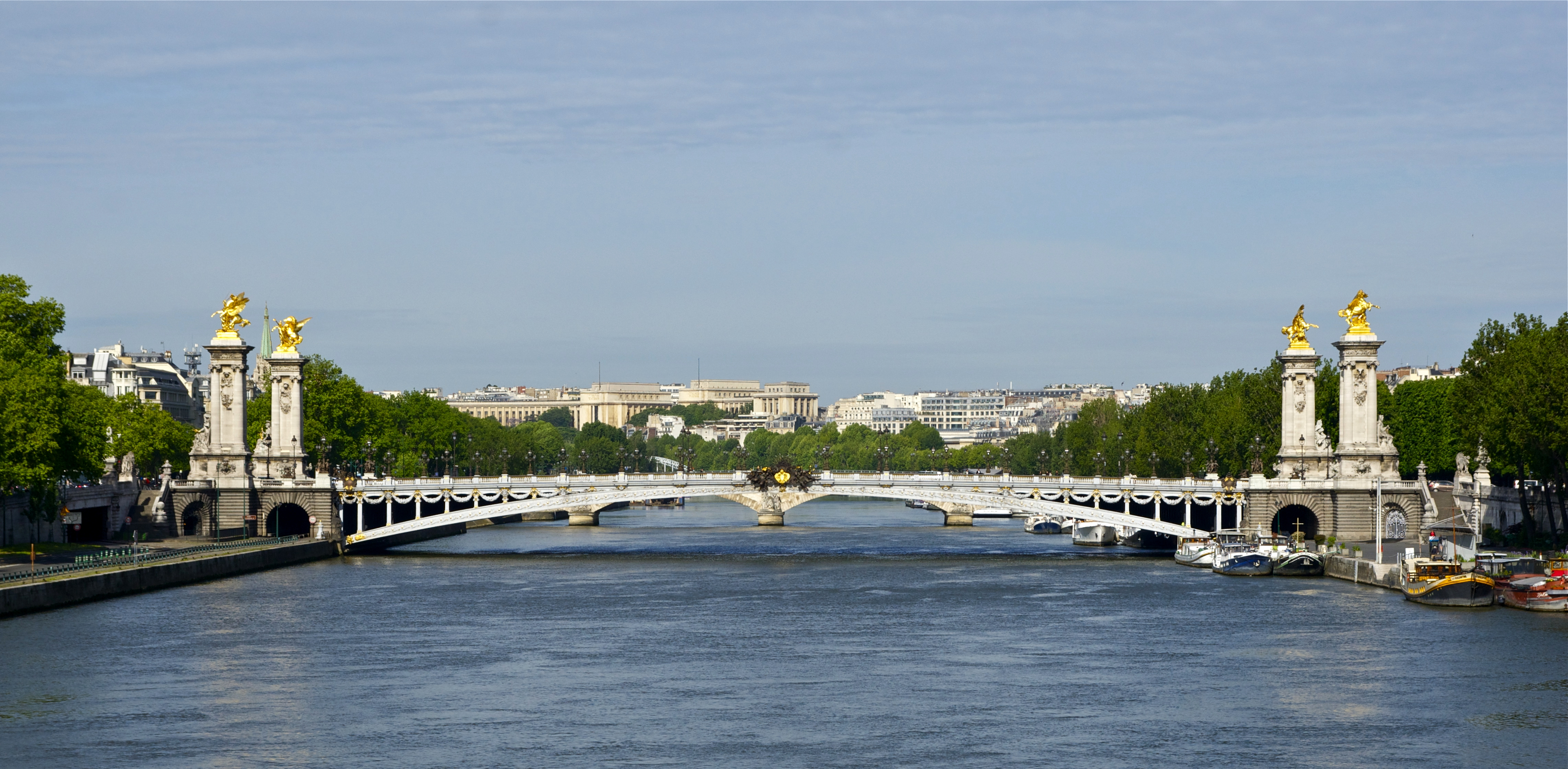
Pont Alexandre III was the starting point of the triathlon competition at the 2024 Summer Olympics in Paris.

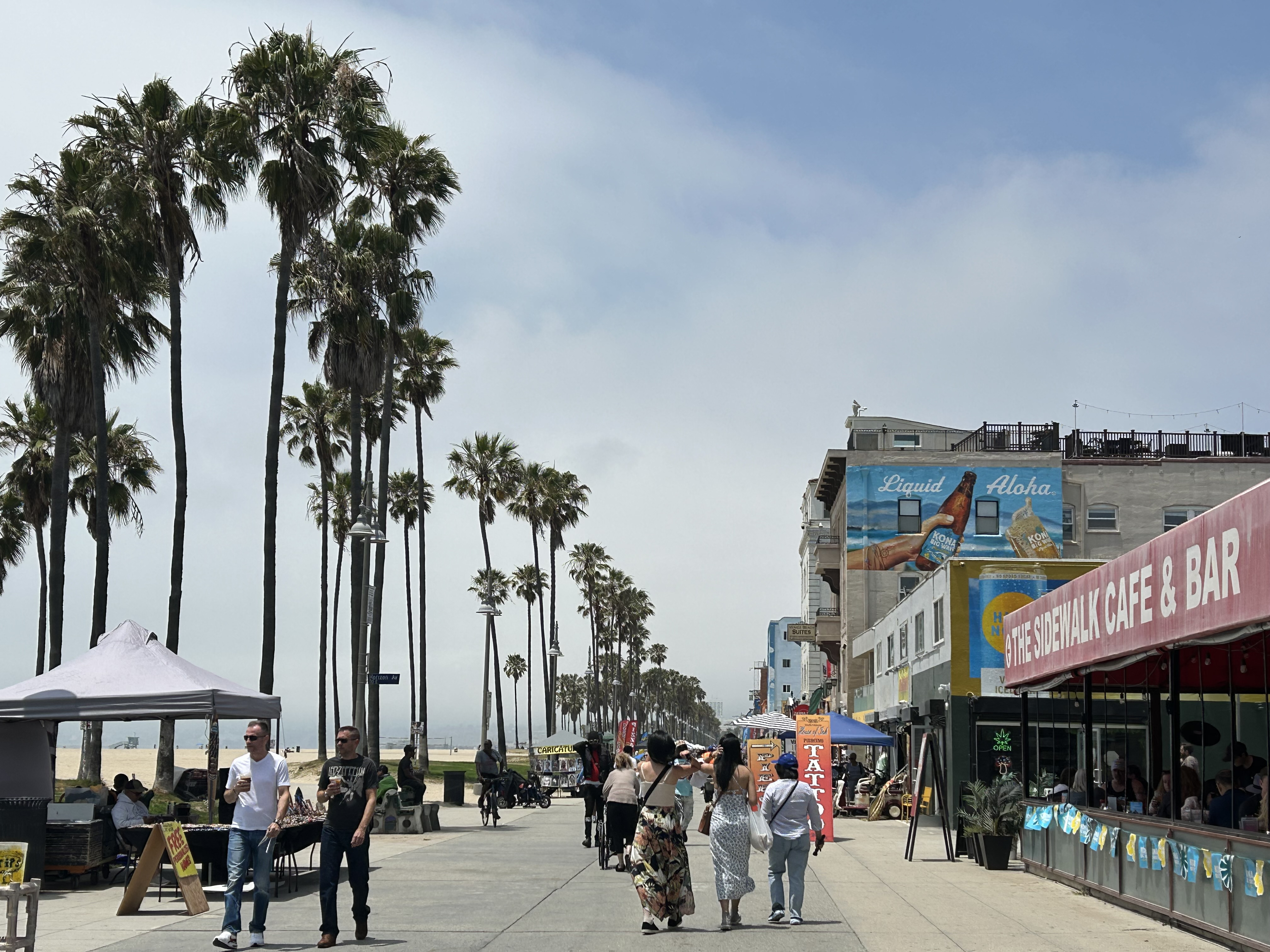
Venice Beach will host triathlon at the 2028 Summer Olympics in Los Angeles.

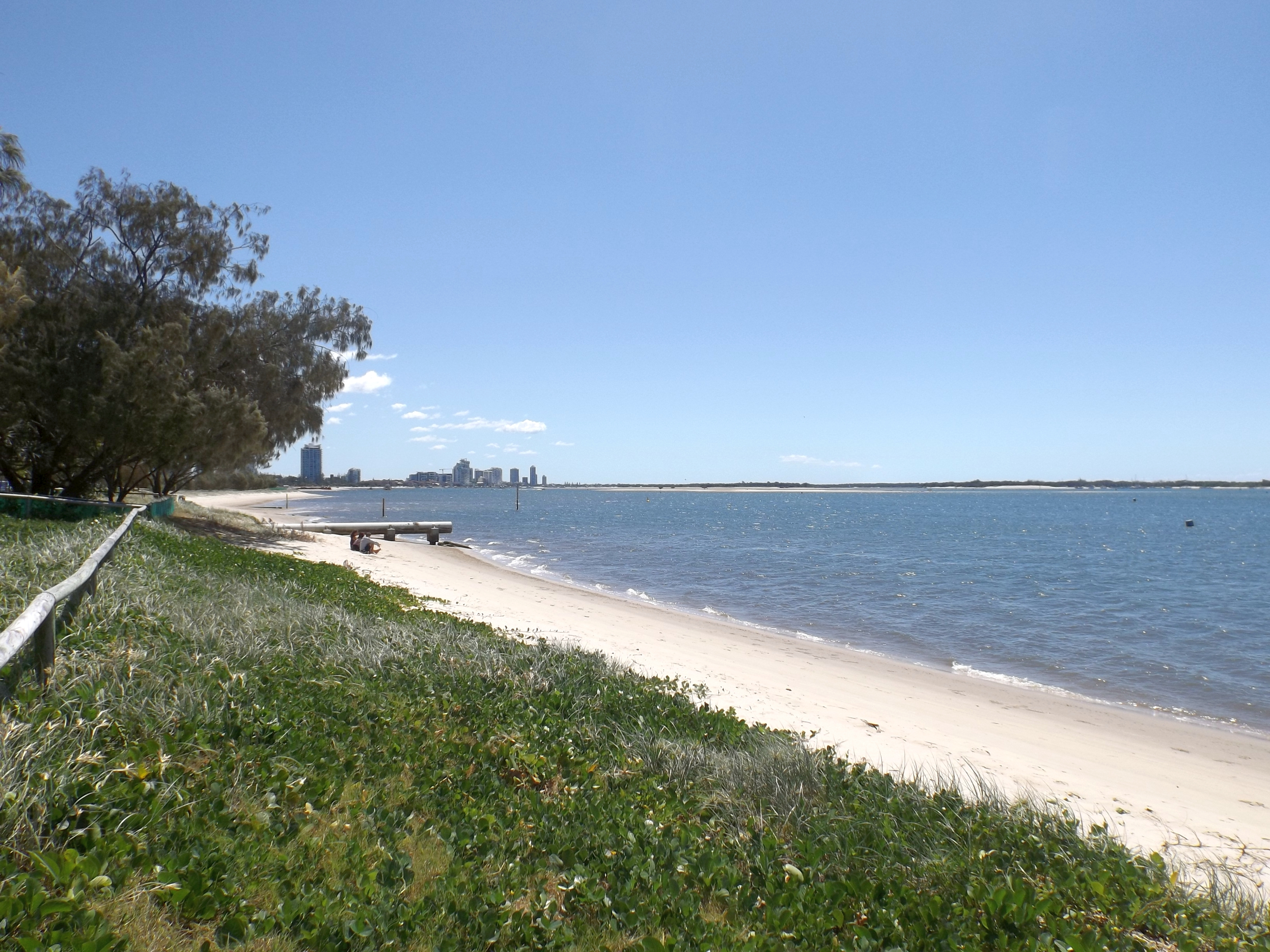
Southport Broadwater Parklands will host triathlon at the 2032 Summer Olympics in Brisbane.
