= Venues of the 1924 Winter Olympics =

For the 1924 Winter Olympics in Chamonix, France, a total of three sports venues were used. The main stadium was used for all but two sports and part of a third. It was the first ski jump used for the Winter Olympics. A bobsleigh track was prepared for use.

== Venues ==
Venue	Sports	Capacity	Ref.
La Piste de Bobsleigh des Pellerins	Bobsleigh	Not listed.	
Le Tremplin Olympique du Mont	Nordic combined (ski jumping), Ski jumping	Not listed.	
Stade Olympique de Chamonix	Cross-country skiing, Curling, Figure skating, Ice hockey, Military patrol, Nordic combined (cross-country skiing), Speed skating	45,000	

== After the Olympics ==
The stadium and the ski jump served as venues for the FIS Nordic World Ski Championships in 1937. The ski jump was not used in FIS Ski Jumping World Cup until the 1980-81 season when it was won by Norway's Roger Ruud. Its last World Cup event was in 1998 and was won by Finland's Janne Ahonen. A final ski jumping event listed was a Continental Cup in February 2001, but no results were listed. The last cross-country skiing event after the 1937 championships was a Continental Cup event in 1999. This was a women's 10 km event won by Germany's Steffi Völkel and a men's 15 km event won by Spain's Jordi Ribo. As for Nordic combined, two more events have taken place since the 1937 championships though they were World Cup B events. The last Nordic combined event held in Chamonix was a World Cup B event in 2000 and was won by France's Kevin Arnould.

The bobsleigh track was demolished and is now used as an alpine skiing venue.

The Olympic Stadium is still in existence in Chamonix.

Chamonix was part of Annecy's unsuccessful bid for the 2018 Winter Olympics in July 2011. If selected, the city would have hosted alpine skiing and ice hockey events.
