= Venues of the 1960 Winter Olympics =

For the 1960 Winter Olympics in Squaw Valley, California, in the United States, a total of five sports venues were used. Except for the Palisades Tahoe, all of the venues had to be constructed. For the first time in Winter Olympic history, a temporary venue was constructed at McKinney Creek for biathlon, cross-country skiing, and Nordic combined. A bobsleigh track was not constructed over the guarantees from the FIBT not being able to field the minimum twelve teams needed to compete, making it the only time bobsleigh has not been included in the Winter Olympics.

== Venues ==
Venue	Sports	Capacity	Ref.
Blyth Arena	Figure skating, Ice hockey; opening and closing ceremonies	8,500	
McKinney Creek Stadium	Biathlon, Cross-country skiing, Nordic combined (cross-country skiing)	1,000	
Papoose Peak Ski jumping hill	Ski jumping, Nordic combined (ski jumping)	Not listed.	
Squaw Valley Olympic Skating Rink	Ice hockey, Speed skating	8500	
Palisades Tahoe	Alpine skiing	9,650	

== Before the Olympics ==
Bobsleigh was not included at this Winter Olympics at a 1957 International Olympic Committee meeting in Sofia, Bulgaria because of a lack of assurance from the International Bobsleigh Federation (FIBT) on having a minimum twelve teams. This was why a track was not constructed for the 1960 Games. As a result, an extraordinary event would take place at the 1956 Winter Olympic venue used for bobsleigh.

The ski jump was designed in 1957 with construction beginning the following year. It was completed the following year with trial events taking place in February 1959. The jumps had calculation (K) points of 40 m (130 ft), 60 m (200 ft), and 80 m (260 ft), the first time in Olympic history that there were three ski jumps.

McKinney Creek Stadium in Tahoma, California on the western side of Lake Tahoe was constructed in August 1959 and completed in time for the 1960 Games. The organizing committee originally intended to house all events in Squaw Valley proper, but real estate developments in Squaw Valley made this difficult.

Mount Rose Ski Tahoe was chosen as an alternate venue for the Downhill event, in case Palisades Tahoe did not receive enough snow. To this end, an official FIS Downhill run and additional facilities were constructed. The facilities at Mount Rose were never used in the Winter Olympics, as it started snowing on the day of the opening ceremony and Palisades was able to host the Downhill event as planned.

== During the Olympics ==
The speed skating venue used a Zamboni-type machine that could completely resurface the oval in 45 minutes. This led to four world records being set at the oval.

The cross-country men's 4 x 10 km relay event at McKinney Stadium produced an exciting finish in which Finland edged out Norway by 0.8 seconds, the closest event finish in Olympic history until Norway lost out again 34 years later by 0.4 seconds, only this time to Italy.

== After the Olympics ==
Blyth Arena continued as an indoor venue until a heavy snowstorm in 1983 collapsed the roof. By 1991, the arena was demolished as replaced by an outdoor arena that was part of a revitalization plan in Squaw Valley. The speed skating venue was also dismantled by 1991.

The jump was used for the US National Championships in 1976 following renovations. Afterwards, the jump became known for speed skiing and snowboarding events and now serve as alpine skiing events.

After the Olympics, McKinney Creek Stadium was dismantled since it was a temporary venue. The trails where the cross-country skiing and biathlon events took place are popular off-road trails.

Palisades Tahoe hosted an Alpine Skiing World Cup in early 1969, the only alpine event of significance held there since 1960. FIS Races that are not of World Cup level have taken place in 1998, 2001, 2005, and 2010. The ski resort continues to be a popular alpine skiing and snowboarding attraction and is the only venue of the 1960 Games still in use as of 2010.

As of 2016, three buildings from the 1960 Winter Olympics remain in Palisades Tahoe. An expansion of the resort's village, currently in the planning stages, would see two of these buildings demolished.
