= List of Olympic venues in Softball =

For the Summer Olympics, there are four venues that have been or will be used for Softball.

Games	Venue	Other sports hosted at venue for those games	Capacity	Ref.
1996 Atlanta	Golden Park	None	8,800	
2000 Sydney	Blacktown Olympic Park	Baseball	8,000	
2004 Athens	Olympic Softball Stadium	None	4,800	
2008 Beijing	Fengtai Softball Field	None	13,000	
2020 Tokyo	Yokohama Stadium, Fukushima Azuma Baseball Stadium (opening match)	Baseball	34,046, 30,000	
2028 Los Angeles	Devon Park	None	13,000	
