= Venues of the 1964 Winter Olympics =

For the 1964 Winter Olympics in Innsbruck, Austria, a total of eight sports venues were used. Luge made its debut at these games, but were marred by the death of a British slider two weeks prior to the Games. A second ski jumping event debuted and the best two out of three jumps were used in both events for the only time in the history of the Winter Olympics. All eight venues would be used again when the Winter Games returned to Innsbruck twelve years later though the venues would undergo renovations in time for the 1976 Games.

== Venues ==
Venue	Sports	Capacity	Ref.
Axamer Lizum	Alpine skiing (all but men's downhill)	Not listed	
Bergiselschanze	Ski jumping (large hill)	26,000	
Bob und Rodelbahn Igls	Bobsleigh, Luge	Not listed.	
Eisschnellaufbahn	Speed skating	7,000	
Messehalle	Ice hockey	5,544	
Olympiahalle	Figure skating, Ice hockey	10,836	
Patscherkofel	Alpine skiing (men's downhill)	Not listed.	
Seefeld	Biathlon, Cross-country skiing, Nordic combined, Ski jumping (normal hill)	Not listed.	

== Before the Olympics ==
Before the 1964 Winter Games, Innsbruck hosted several World and European championships. They hosted the Alpine World Ski Championships both in 1933 and 1936. In 1933, Innsbruck served as host to the FIS Nordic World Ski Championships.

Innsbruck hosted its first Bobsleigh World Championships in 1935 in the two-man event, then hosted again in 1963 when the bobsleigh part of the track was used as a test event for the 1964 Games. Luge was also completed at the same time though Kazimierz Kay-Skrzypeski of Great Britain was killed in a practice run on the luge part of the track two weeks before the start of the 1964 Games. Igls also served as host of the European Luge Championships in 1951 though the track used was not constructed until 1963.

Since 1952-3 ski jumping season, Bergiselschanze has been part of the Four Hills Tournament.

Seefeld hosted the Biathlon World Championships in 1963 which also served as a test event for the 1964 Games.

== During the Olympics ==
The ski jumping events were the only one in Winter Olympic history to use the best two out of three jumps for medals. This saved Finland's Veikko Kankkonen in the normal hill event after he followed a disastrous first jump with the longest second and the second-longest third jumps.

== After the Olympics ==
Bergiselschanze continued to play host as one of the hills for the Four Hills Tournament.

Innsbruck would host the Winter Olympics twelve years later following the withdrawal of Denver, Colorado in the United States for those games in late 1972 following a referendum. All eight venues from the 1964 Games were used for the 1976 Games with some improvements. The bobsleigh and luge tracks were demolished and converted into an artificially refrigerated combination track, the first of its kind in the world. Ski jumps at Bergsiel and Seefeld both had improving judging stations. Two new artificial ice rinks were built, one for figure skating and the other for ice hockey. Eischnellaufen had new refrigeration done on its 400 m lap circuit.
