= Venues of the 1928 Winter Olympics =

For the 1928 Winter Olympics in St. Moritz, Switzerland, a total of five sports venues were used. The main stadium hosted the figure skating, ice hockey, and speed skating events. Skeleton was first held at the Cresta Run. Bobsleigh was held at the bob run. St. Moritz itself served as cross-country skiing venue and the cross-country part of the Nordic combined event. Weather gave two events run at these games problems, creating the largest margin of victory in Olympic history for one and the cancellation of the other.

== Venues ==
Venue	Sports	Capacity	Ref.
Around the hills of St. Moritz	Cross-country skiing, Nordic combined (cross-country skiing)	Not listed.	
Cresta Run	Skeleton	Not listed.	
Olympiaschanze St. Moritz	Nordic combined (ski jumping), Ski jumping	Not listed.	
St. Moritz Olympic Ice Rink	Figure skating, Ice hockey, Speed skating	4,000	
St. Moritz-Celerina Olympic Bobrun	Bobsleigh	Not listed.	

== During the Olympics ==
The 50 km cross-country skiing event took place on 14 February around the hills of St. Moritz with time markers at Silvaplan (5 km (3.1 mi)), Sils (9.4 km (5.8 mi)), Plaun da Lei (15 km (9.3 mi)), Maloja (20 km (12 mi)), Isola (24 km (15 mi)), Fex (38 km (24 mi)), and Surlej (40 km (25 mi)) before returning to St. Moritz. There was an 1,100 m (3,600 ft)) change in elevation during the 50 km race. The race was also unusual in the sense of the extreme change in weather when it started at nearly 0 °F (−18 °C) and ended at 77 °F (25 °C). It would produce the largest margin of victory in Olympic history with Sweden's Per-Erik Hedlund beating fellow Swede Gustaf Jonsson by 13 minutes and 27 seconds.

On that same day in the 10,000 m speed skating event at the ice rink, the event was stopped 2000 meters into the fifth and final pair due to thawing ice. Officials in charge ordered the day's times cancelled and the races rerun. The problem was that by the time the decision was reached to rerun the event, Norway had made it clear that American Irving Jaffee was event champion and had left for their home country. The contest was cancelled as a result. Skaters involved in the event considered it settled when Jaffee came from behind to edge Norway's Bernt Evensen in the opening pair. According to David Wallechinsky, most sports historians consider the 1928 10,000 m to be a non-event.

== After the Olympics ==
All five venues used for these games were reused for the Winter Olympics held in St. Moritz twenty years later.

The bob run, which opened in 1904, is still in use and has hosted the FIBT World Championships a record 22 times, most recently in 2013.

The ski jump was built originally in 1905 and renovated in 1927 for the 1928 Games. It was renovated in 1963 to get it to the K-point of 90 m (300 ft). It was closed in 2006.
