= Lake Spivey =

Lake in Georgia, United States

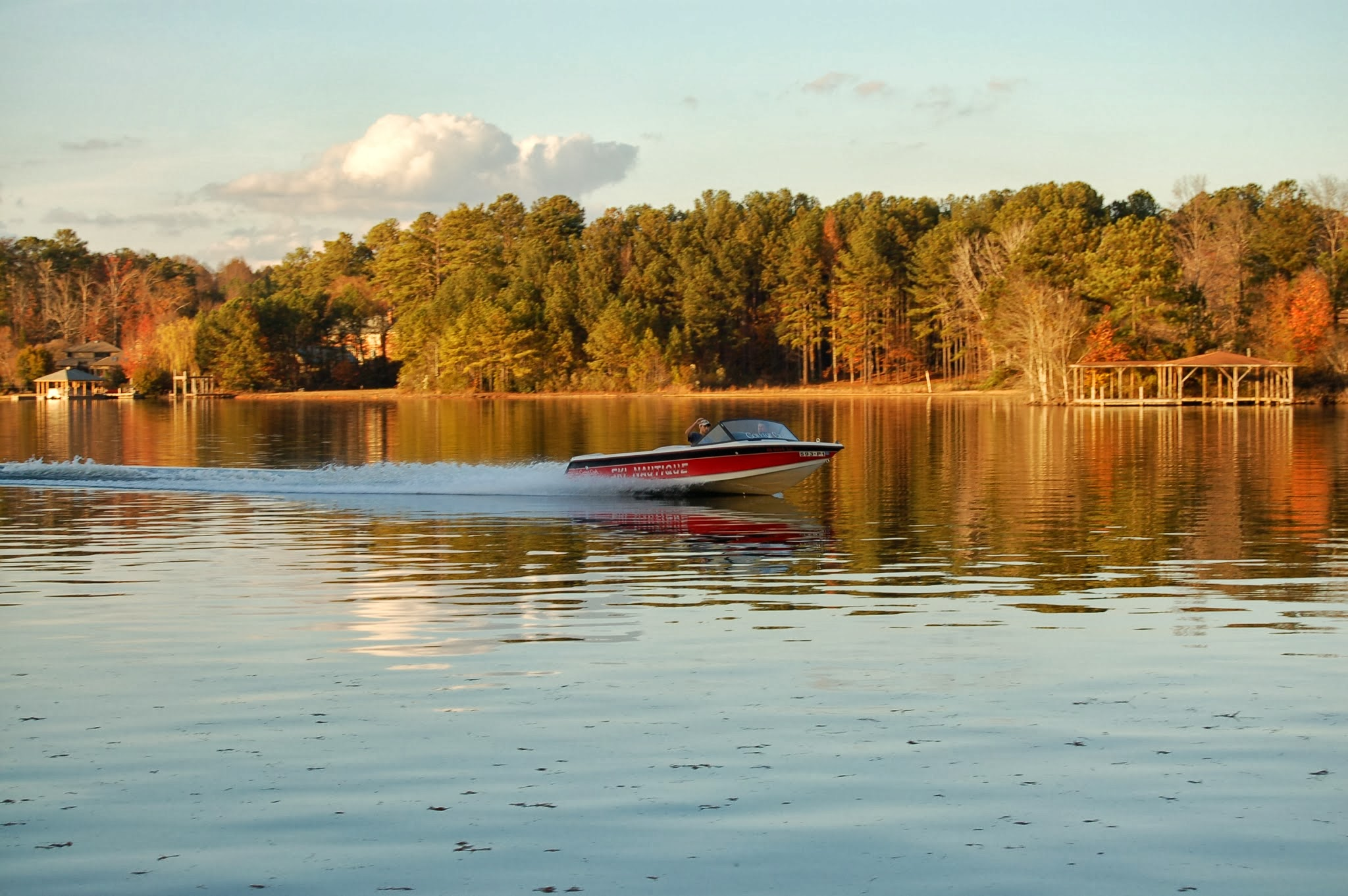

- Location within Georgia Location within the United States
- Location: Georgia, USA
- Coordinates: 33°31′00″N 84°17′39″W
- Type: Artificial
- Primary inflows: Rum Creek, Line Creek
- Primary outflows: Rum Creek
- Basin countries: United States
- Max. length: 3 mi (4.8 km)
- Max. width: Less than 1 mile (1.6 km)
- Surface area: 600 acres (240 ha) Approx
- Average depth: 10 ft (3.0 m) Approx
- Max. depth: 43 ft (13 m) Approx
- Shore length^{1}: 11 mi (18 km) Approx
- Surface elevation: 784 ft (239 m)
- ^{1} Shore length is not a well-defined measure.

Lake Spivey is a 600 acres (240 ha) (550 acres (220 ha), 600 acres (240 ha)) private lake located in Clayton County and Henry County, Georgia near Jonesboro.

== History ==
The lake was created by Dr. Walter Boone Spivey, a prominent Buckhead dentist, and his wife Emilie. The lake formed following the completion of construction on an earthen dam on Rum Creek in September 1957. The lake was built on land, formerly known as Betts Farm, which was purchased by the Spiveys in September 1943. The dam formed what was promoted as the largest privately owned lake in the state of Georgia. Lake Arrowhead in Waleska, Georgia is also promoted as the largest private lake in Georgia. Georgia Department of Natural Resources records indicate that Lake Spivey is 600 acres and Lake Arrowhead is 450 acres at normal pool level.

== Development and use ==
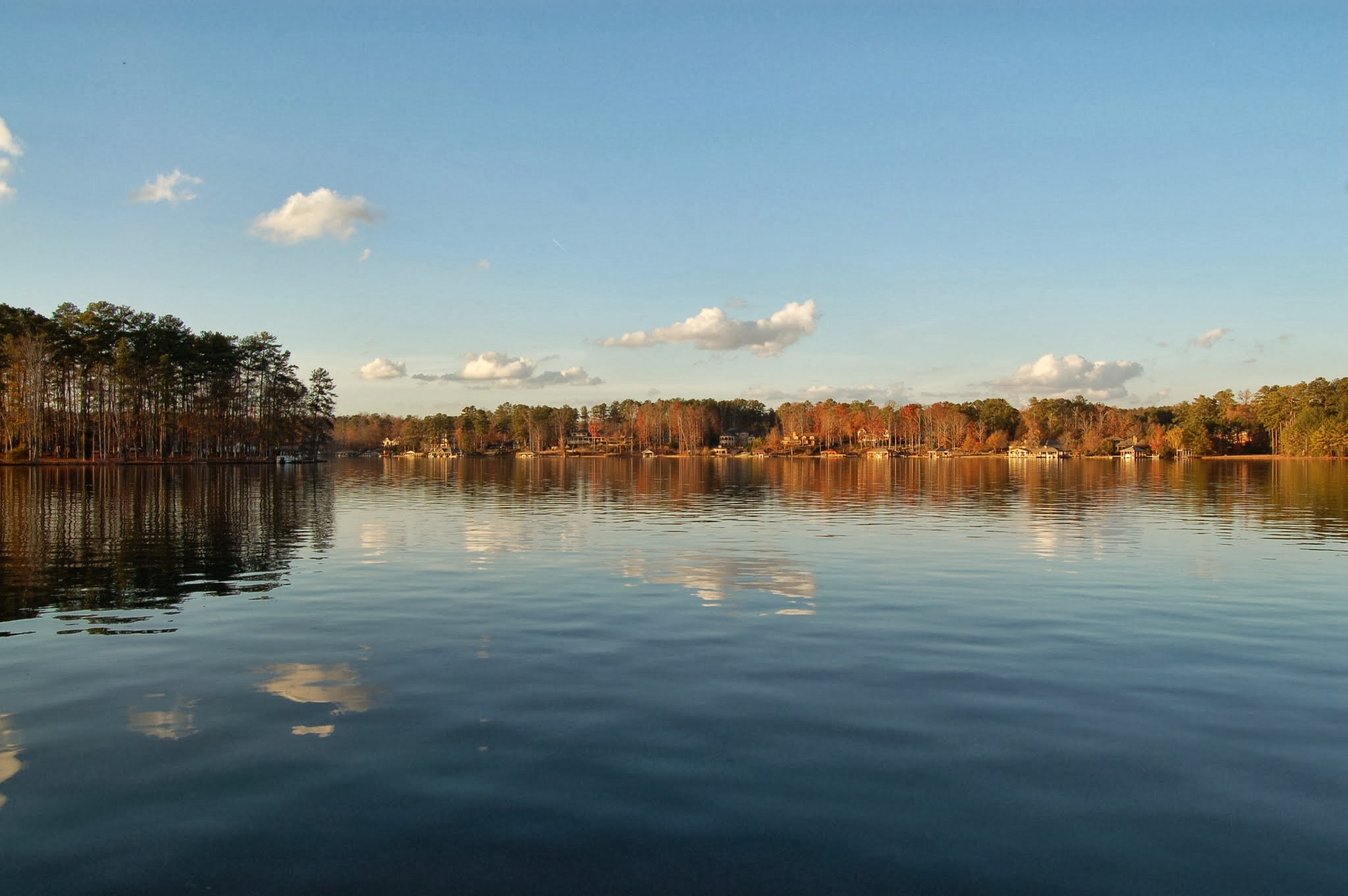
Lake Spivey shoreline in 2012

The Spiveys also created a peach orchard, residential developments around the lake, and Lake Spivey Park on the property. The park opened in June 1959. For years in the 1960s the park served as the venue for professional water skiing shows. In 1963 and 1964 the lake was the venue for the now defunct National Outboard Association (NOA) National championship boat races. Lake Spivey was the backdrop for numerous concerts in the late 1960s and early 1970s including performances by the bands Pink Floyd, Blue Öyster Cult, Chicago, Freddie King, Lynyrd Skynyrd, B. B. King, Ike and Tina Turner, and ZZ Top.

The lake was the location filming for the movie The Legend of Blood Mountain (1965) starring George Ellis and Erin Fleming. Burt Reynolds lived on the lake during the filming of Smokey and the Bandit (1977) in Jonesboro.

Located in the suburbs 20 miles (32 km) south of downtown Atlanta, Lake Spivey is also 20 miles (32 km) from Atlanta Hartsfield-Jackson International Airport (14 miles (23 km) to the new International Terminal) and less than 15 miles (24 km) from the Atlanta Motor Speedway in Hampton. Lake Spivey was originally developed with seven residential communities; Lake Spivey Estates, Lost Valley, Bay View, South Bay, The Landings, Forest Estates, and North Shore. An eighth community, Edgewater on Lake Spivey, was created in 1997 on property once occupied by the lake clubhouse.

== Ownership ==
In 1984 the lake was deeded by Emilie Spivey to the Lake Spivey Civic Association which owns and manages the lake today. Members of the association include only property owners from the eight communities around the lake. Each community has either one central marina or several smaller mooring strips located around the lake for access and docking. The lake has no public access.

== Hydrology ==
Inflows to the lake include Rum Creek, Line Creek via adjacent 70 acres (28 ha) (87 acres (35 ha)) Lake Jodeco, Vaughn Branch from Drakes Lake and Drakes Landing Lake, and Indian Lake from Clayton County International Park. Outflow from the lake is through Rum Creek. Rum Creek flows into Little Cotton Indian Creek and the Clayton County Reservoir in Henry County. From the Clayton County Reservoir, Little Cotton Indian Creek flows into Big Cotton Indian Creek. Big Cotton Indian Creek flows into the South River and Lake Jackson. These are all part of the Ocmulgee River watershed.

== Recreation ==
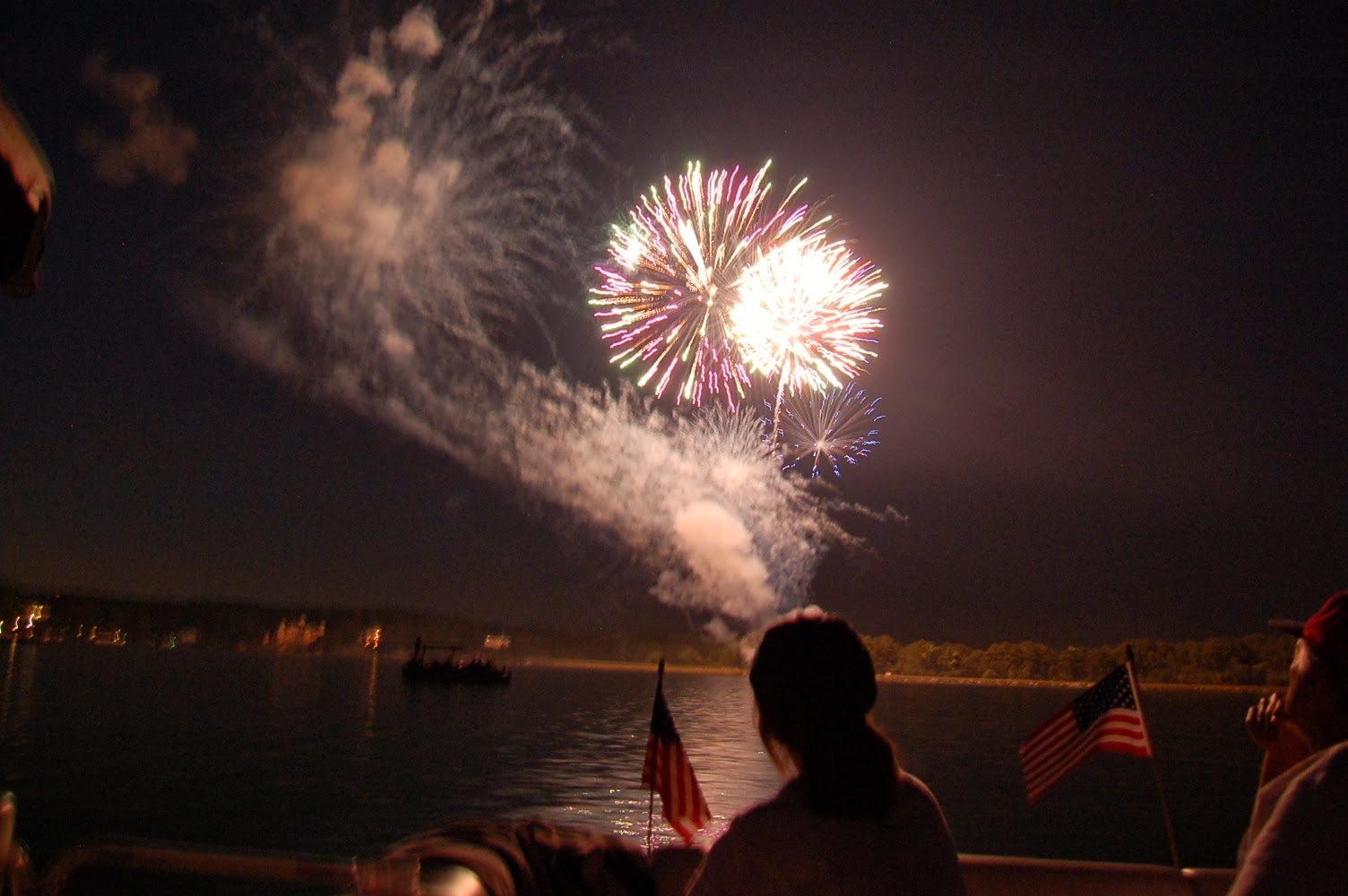
Lake Spivey fireworks show in 2010

Recreational boating on the lake is restricted by the Lake Spivey Civic Association to a 40-mph speed limit during day-light hours and 5-mph after sunset. Residents enjoy cruising with pontoon boats, jet skiing, water skiing, wakeboarding, canoeing, kayaking, tubing, swimming, and fishing. Every Fourth of July the civic association puts on a fireworks display which residents enjoy from their boats and along the shoreline. A slalom water skiing course is permanently located near the dam. Water skiers can typically be seen on the course during the summer months when the lack of wind makes for ideal conditions.

Lake Spivey is tied as the location for the Georgia state record for the largest black crappie caught. Hooked by Steve Cheek in 1975, the fish weighed 4 lbs 4 oz.

In 2006 the community worked with United States Postal Service officials to allow the city, state, and Zip+4 last line mailing address of "Lake Spivey, GA 30236+4" in addition to the previously accepted "Jonesboro, GA 30236+4".

In 2008 the Lake Spivey Road Race was created to promote the neighborhoods around the lake. The annual foot race, which takes place in November, features a 5K and 15K course. Participants on the 15K course run the circumference of Lake Spivey and Lake Jodeco. Both courses are USA Track & Field (USATF) certified and provide a challenge to runners as the topography is quite hilly. The USATF course numbers are GA09021WC for the 5K and GA08011WC for the 15K.

During the 2009-2010 regular session the General Assembly of Georgia approved that the portion of Georgia State Route 138 between Interstate 675 and the limits of the City of Jonesboro be designated the Lake Spivey Parkway.

In 2011 the civic association created green space at the west most portion of the lake for use by residents and their guests. In 2013 and 2014 Lake Spivey played host to the Swim Across America, Atlanta open water swim charity event to raise funds for cancer research.

The lake communities are bordered by the Clayton County International Park, Reid Stephens Heritage Park and Wildlife Sanctuary, and Lake Spivey Country Club to the north, and Lake Jodeco to the south.

== See also ==
- Lake Jodeco
