= Lake Jodeco =

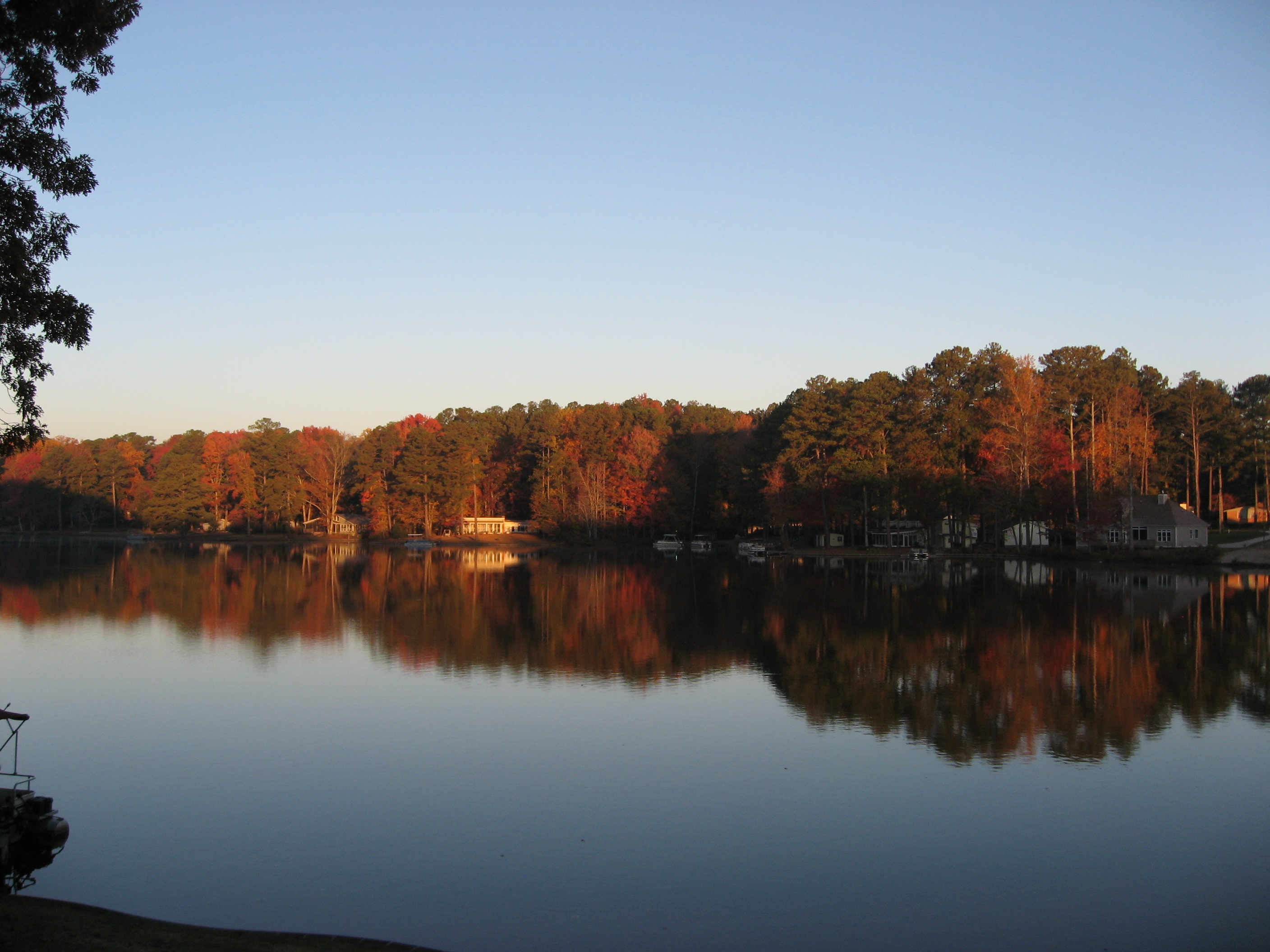

- Location within Georgia Location within the United States
- Location: Georgia, U.S.
- Coordinates: 33°30′27″N 84°17′24″W
- Type: Artificial
- Primary inflows: Line Creek
- Primary outflows: Rum Creek
- Basin countries: United States
- Max. length: Approx. 0.9 mi (1.45 km)
- Max. width: Less than 0.3-mile (0.48 km)
- Surface area: Approx. 70 acres (28.33 ha)
- Average depth: Approx. 6 ft (1.83 m)
- Max. depth: Approx. 15 ft (4.57 m)
- Surface elevation: 784 ft (239 m)

Lake Jodeco is a private 70 acre man-made lake in Clayton County, Georgia, east of Jonesboro, Georgia. The area now known as Lake Jodeco was once inhabited by the Muskogee Creek Nation.

== History ==
Prior to the end of World War II, the Lake Jodeco area was a rural farm land connected to the City of Jonesboro by a one-lane dirt road. In the lowland of this farming area was a small mill pond with a crude earthen dam. Dr. Walter Spivey (who was born on a farm in North Carolina and attended what is now Duke University) was a practicing dentist in Atlanta. One of Dr. Spivey's patients, the Sheriff of Clayton County, W. Loy Dickson (brother of Jonesboro's late Mayor Hugh Dickson) sold Dr. and Mrs. Spivey 800 acres just five miles east of Jonesboro which they intended to farm and eventually develop. A tenant house stood on the piece of property which is now the corner of Jodeco Road and Jodeco Drive. The lake itself was created in 1947. Its name was derived out of the Jonesboro Development Corporation, an organization formed by Dr. Spivey and several associates.

There are 212 homesites in addition to several access lots and common docks for all lake residents to enjoy lake access. Lake Jodeco sits adjacent to the much larger Lake Spivey. Lake Jodeco was the first of the two lakes created by Dr. Spivey. The two lakes are separated by Jodeco Road which sits on a causeway and a small bridge. Outflows from Lake Jodeco enter Lake Spivey at the bridge. The outflows continue over the Lake Spivey dam spillway and into Rum Creek in Henry County, Georgia.

== Ownership ==
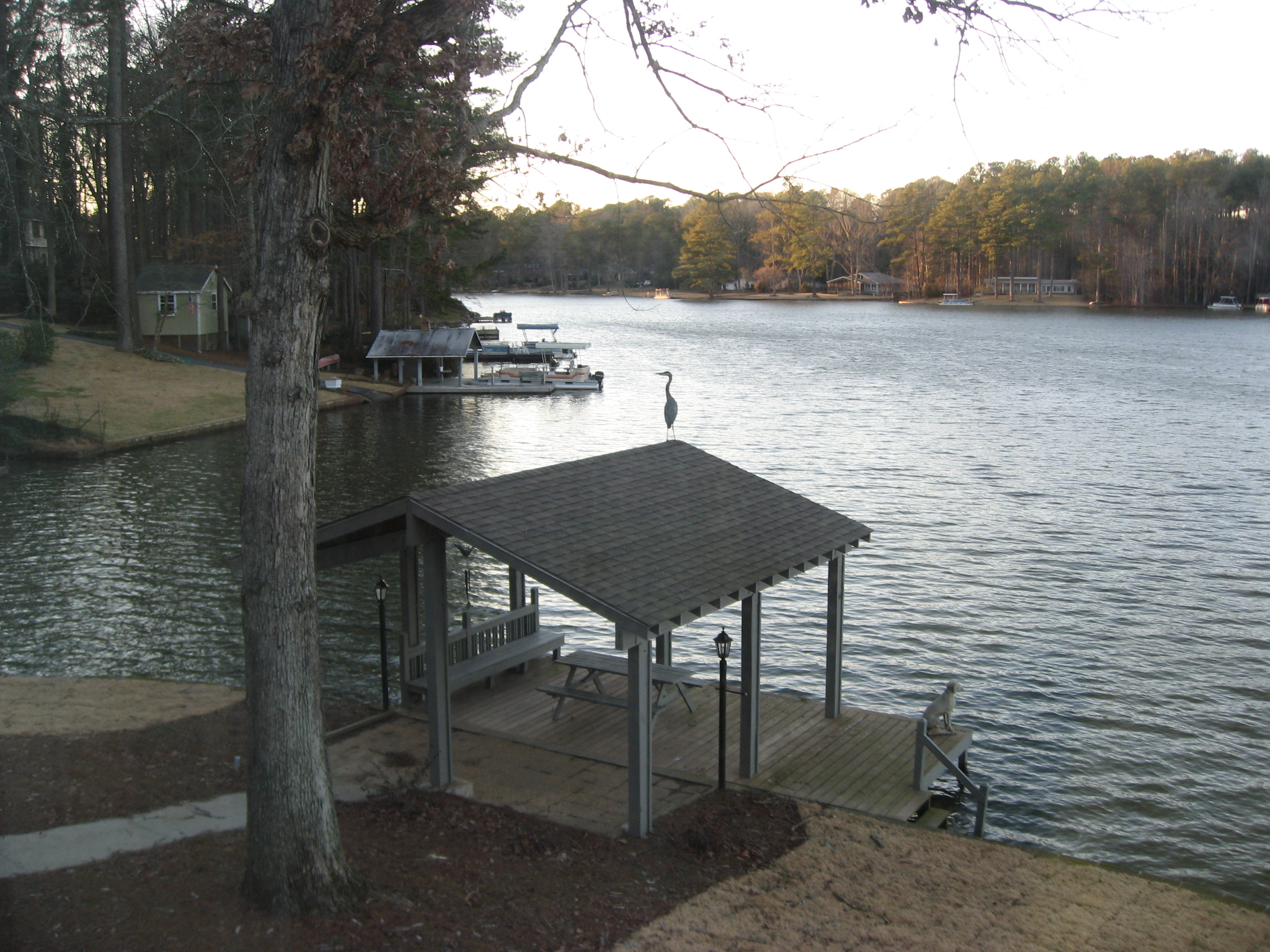
A boat dock on Lake Jodeco

The Lake Jodeco Homeowners Association was formed in 1969. In 1975, the deed to Lake Jodeco was transferred to the homeowners association which owns and maintains the lake today. Members of the homeowners association enjoy fishing, kayaking and cruising on pontoon boats. Jet-skis and speed boats are not permitted on the lake. There are no marinas or common docks. Boaters are limited to speeds of 5-mph or less.

== Recreation ==
In 2008, the Lake Spivey Road Race was created to promote the neighborhoods around the lakes. The annual foot race, which takes place in November, features a 5K and 15K course. Participants on the 15K course run the circumference of Lake Spivey and Lake Jodeco. Both courses are USA Track & Field (USATF) certified and provide a challenge to runners as the topography is quite hilly. The USATF course numbers are GA09021WC for the 5k and GA08011WC for the 15K.

Fishing is also an important part of life on the lake and the lake has produced a number of state records. Lake Jodeco's annual bass tournament with participants including homeowner association members, family, and friends has been well attended for almost 20 years (2002). The tournament takes place in June of each year.
