= Venues of the 1988 Winter Olympics =

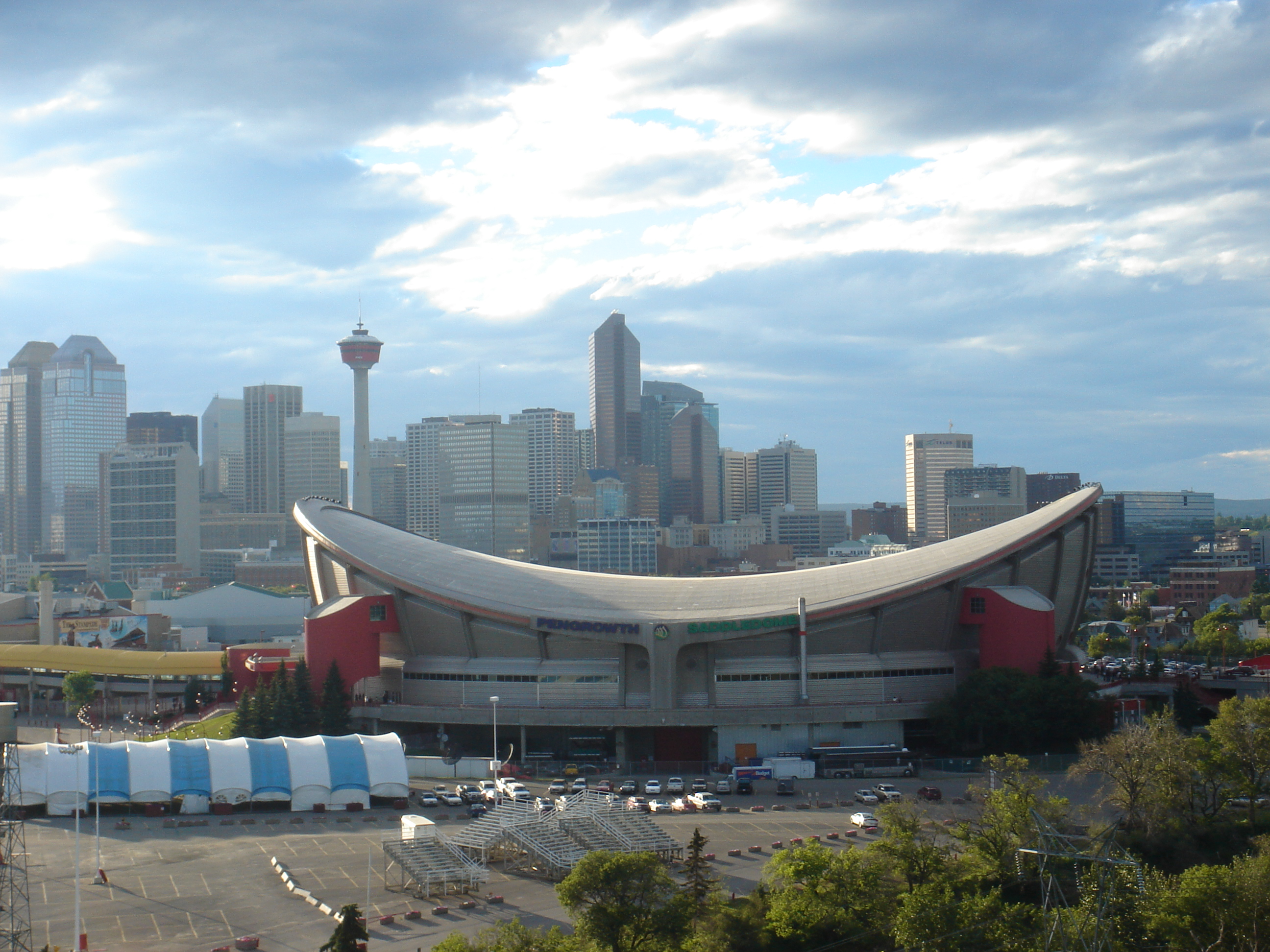
Scotiabank (then Pengrowth) Saddledome in July 2005. This venue, which hosted the figure skating and ice hockey finals for the 1988 Winter Olympics, was under construction in 1981 when Calgary was awarded the 1988 Games.

For the 1988 Winter Olympics in Calgary, Canada, a total of nine sports venues were used. Calgary tried twice to host the Winter Olympics in the 1960s without success before finally winning the 1988 Winter Games in 1981. Stampede Corral was built in 1950 while McMahon Stadium was built in 1960. When the National Hockey League (NHL) Calgary Flames franchise was relocated from Atlanta, United States, during the summer of 1980, a new arena was needed. The Saddledome construction was underway in late 1981 when Calgary was awarded the 1988 Games. Completed in 1983, the Olympic (Scotiabank since October 2010) Saddledome has played host to the Flames ever since, including three Stanley Cup Finals (championship in 1989) and the NHL All-Star Game in 1985. An innovation for the games was the first indoor long-track speed skating venue which has served as a model for future Olympics. The bobsleigh and luge track was the first combination track in North America and was noted for the Jamaican bobsleigh team crash during the four-man event. The Oval continues to host the World Championships in their respective sports since the 1988 Winter Olympics while the bobsleigh/luge/skeleton track was demolished in 2019.

== Venues ==
Venue	Sports	Capacity	Ref.
Canada Olympic Park (includes bobsleigh/luge track)	Bobsleigh, Luge	25,000	
Canada Olympic Park (includes bobsleigh/luge track)	Freestyle skiing (demonstration)	15,000	
Canada Olympic Park (includes bobsleigh/luge track)	Nordic combined, Ski jumping	35,000	
Canmore Nordic Centre	Biathlon, Cross-country skiing, Nordic combined (cross-country skiing)	Not listed.	
Father David Bauer Olympic Arena	Figure skating, Men's & Women's Compulsories. Ice hockey	2,000	
Max Bell Arena	Curling (demonstration), Short track speed skating (demonstration)	3,200	
McMahon Stadium	Ceremonies (opening/closing)	60,000	
Nakiska	Alpine skiing, Freestyle skiing (demonstration)	Not listed.	
Olympic Oval	Speed skating	4,000	
Olympic Saddledome	Figure skating: Men's Free Skate, Women's Short Program & Free Skate, Pairs Free Skate, Ice Dancing Original Program & Free Skate. Ice hockey (finals)	16,605	
Stampede Corral	Figure skating: Men's Short Program, Pairs Short Program, Ice Dancing Compulsories. Ice hockey	6,475	

== Before the Olympics ==
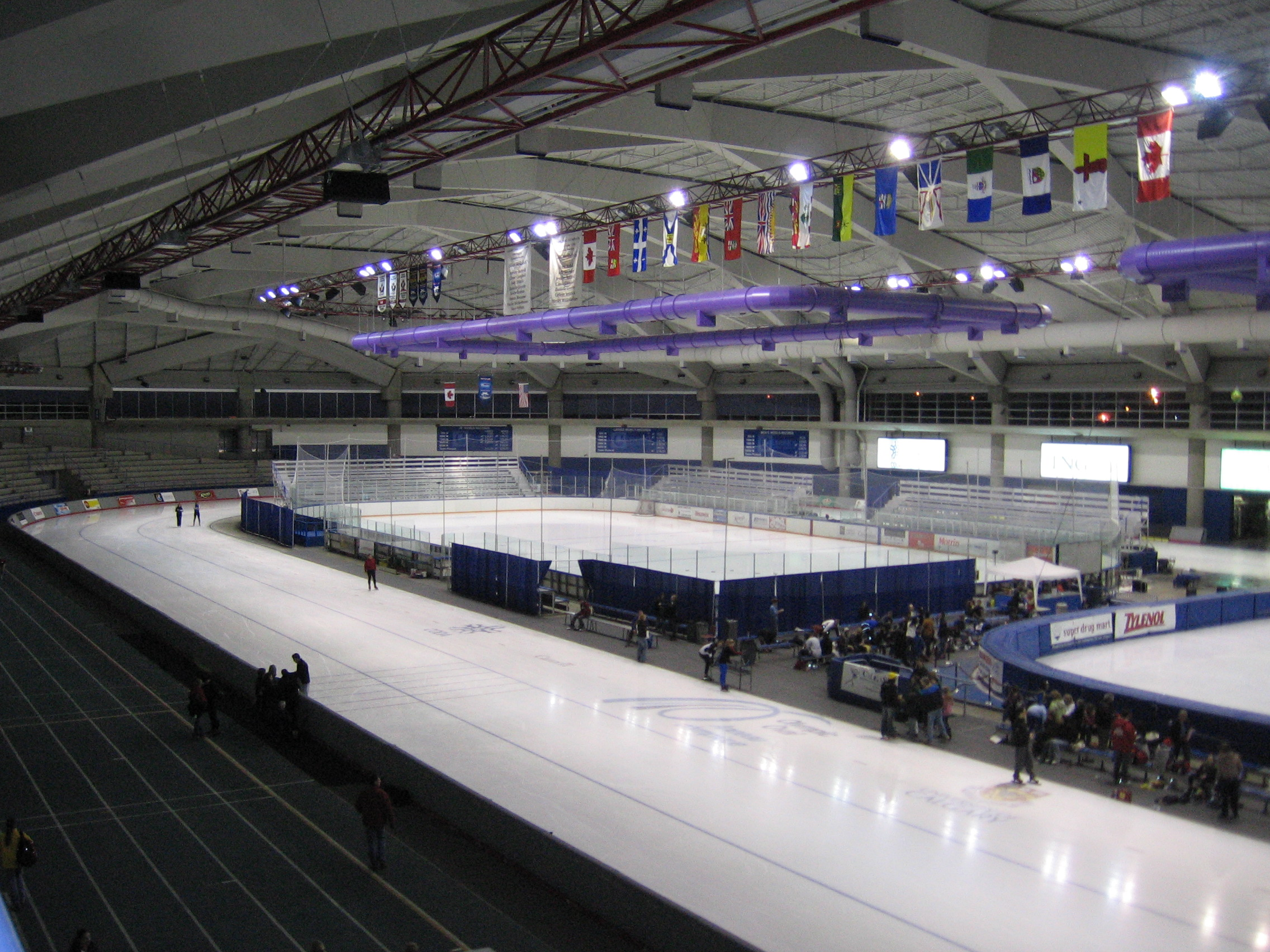
Olympic Oval in 2006. The venue hosted the speed skating events for the 1988 Winter Olympics. It was one of the first indoor speed skating venues in the world.

Stampede Corral was constructed in 1950, hosting the Calgary Stampeders ice hockey team from 1950 until they went out of business in 1972, then played again in 1978–79 under five different minor hockey leagues. Following the 1979–80 National Hockey League (NHL) season, the Flames franchise moved from their original founding at Atlanta in the United States to Calgary. The first place the Flames relocated to in Calgary as a venue was Stampede Corral which they used from the 1980–81 to the 1982–83 NHL seasons. After that, the Flames moved to the Olympic Saddledome (Scotiabank Saddledome since October 2010) for the 1983–84 NHL season where they remain as of 2019. The Corral hosted the World Figure Skating Championships in 1972 and continues to be of use for the annual Calgary Stampede rodeo events.

The Canadian Football League (CFL) Calgary Stampeders moved into McMahon Stadium in 1960. In 1975, McMahon Stadium hosted the Grey Cup where the Edmonton Eskimos defeated the Montreal Alouettes 9–8.

Calgary first bid for the Winter Olympics was in 1959 for the 1964 Games, losing to Innsbruck. Their second Winter Olympic bid attempt was for the 1968 Winter Olympics, losing to Grenoble by three votes in 1964. The third time was the charm for Calgary in 1981 when they were awarded the 1988 Winter Olympics over Falun, Sweden and Cortina d'Ampezzo, Italy.

It was Bill Pratt, the former contractor who took over as Calgary Organizing Committee president in 1983, and who supervised the enormous construction project. Says Donald Jacques, general manager of the Calgary Exhibition and Stampede: “Because of him, everything was built on time and on budget.” But Pratt rubbed many colleagues the wrong way. As a former co-worker predicted in 1983: “He will get everything built. There may not be many left around to enjoy it, but he’ll get it done.”

The Saddledome was under construction in 1981 when Calgary was awarded the 1988 Games. At its 1983 completion, the first sporting event held was on 15 October against the Edmonton Oilers. The 1985 NHL All-Star Game took place at the Saddledome. The Flames lost the 1986 Stanley Cup Final to the Montreal Canadiens in five games of which three were played at the Saddledome while two were played at the Montreal Forum, a 1976 Summer Olympic venue.

Canmore's construction ran from 1983 to 1986. Canada Olympic Park was constructed between 1984 and 1986. The Olympic Oval's construction was modeled on the Olympic Oval used for the 1932 and 1980 Winter Olympics in Lake Placid, New York in the United States. There would be one exception with this being domed, a first for speed skating provided Olympic organizers received approval from the International Skating Union (ISU). The ISU approved this and construction of the first indoor long-track speed skating venue ran from 1985 to 1987. Father David Bauer Arena was constructed between 1985 and 1987. Naskiska was constructed between 1983 and 1987. Max Bell Arena had its facilities renovated for the 1988 Winter Olympics though no stated timeframe was given in the official Olympic report.

Prior to being selected by the Canadian Olympic Committee as Canada's official bid, CODA sought to put the bobsled track in Spray Valley Provincial Park, however when consulted former Canadian gold medalist Vic Emery noted the spot was too steep. The conversation took place during a September 1979 site investigation by COC while at the mountain, and Frank King CODA's chairman quickly selected a gentler hill next to the original location.

== During the Olympics ==
At the Oval, every speed skating event had an Olympic Record and all but three of those events had World Records set during those games. At the bobsleigh and luge track, East German bobsledder Wolfgang Hoppe complained about the track's condition during the two-man event, stating that it was like "running on sandpaper", especially during the event's second run. The bobsleigh four-man event was highlighted during the third run when the Jamaican bobsleigh team crashed after exiting the Kriesel turn, sliding all the way down the rest of the track. Jamaica did not compete in the fourth run as a result. In women's singles luge, the final two runs were delayed a day to heavy winds.

Weather delays forced the individual Nordic combined event to be held on a single day on the last day of the Winter Olympics. East German biathlete Jürgen Wirth had test fired in windy conditions before the start of the 4 × 7.5 km relay. At the time of the relay, leadoff skier Wirth had not adjusted his rifle sight to the winds having died down. He missed three of his first five shots, dropping the East German team to 12th place with a deficit of almost two minutes after the first exchange. East Germany would win the silver medal in the event, finishing 1:07.4 behind the Soviet Union.

== After the Olympics ==
The Saddledome continue to play host the Flames, and witnessed two more Stanley Cup Finals with a win over Montreal in 1989 and a loss to the Tampa Bay Lightning in 2004. In 1995, the Saddledome underwent renovations in time to reopen for the 1995–96 NHL season. Reba McEntire gave the first concert held at the Saddledome later that year following the renovations.

The Oval has played host for the World Speed Skating Championships on eleven occasions since the Games. This included the Allround in 1990 (women), 1992 (men), 2006, 2011, and 2015; the Sprint in 1994, 1999, 2003, 2012, and 2017; and the Single Distance in 1998.

The bobsleigh, luge, and skeleton track (Skeleton was added in the early 1990s) have hosted the FIBT World Championships in 1992 (skeleton), 1996 (skeleton), 2001 (women's bobsleigh, men's and women's skeleton), and 2005. It hosted the FIL World Luge Championships in 1990, 1993, and 2001. The track would be demolished in 2019.

Ski jumping has taken place at Canada Olympic Park though the last recorded competition was in 2003. Freestyle skiing took place in 1989 and 1990, but was restarted in 2009 and 2010. Nordic combined's last event in the Calgary area took place in 2002 and it was a mass start event. Canmore Nordic Centre has hosted cross-country skiing events since 1995, including the last cross-country events before the 2010 Winter Olympics in Vancouver the weekend before those Games began. The last biathlon events that took place at Canmore was in February 2016.

McMahon Stadium hosted the Grey Cup in 1993, 2000, 2009, and 2019
