= Clayton County International Park =

Park in Georgia, United States

Clayton County International Park is a park located in Clayton County, Georgia, United States, with a Jonesboro post office address, south of Atlanta. Built for the beach volleyball competition for the 1996 Summer Olympics, the main venue is part of the Lakeview View Complex which is used for concerts.

The area surrounding the Complex is used for water parks, softball, soccer, fishing, and bike trails.
