= Venues of the 1976 Summer Olympics =

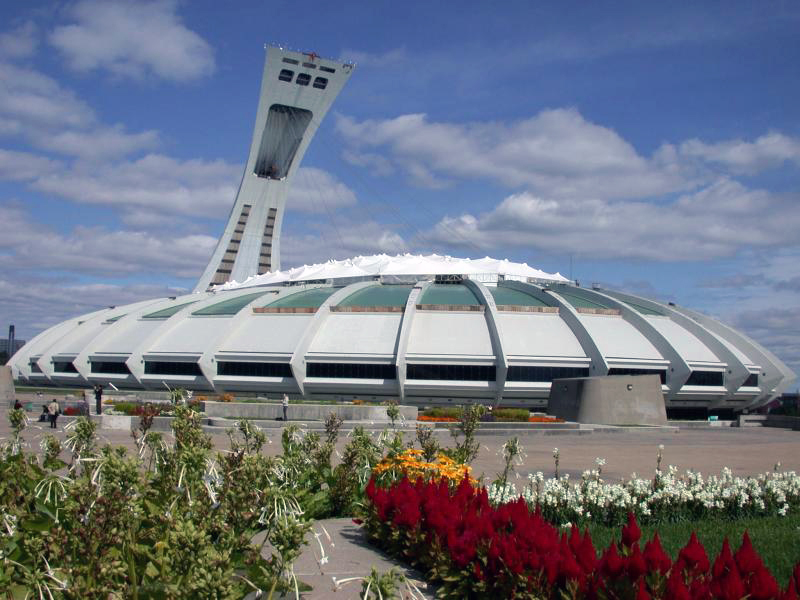
Olympic Stadium in 2006. At the time of the 1976 Summer Olympics, the tower and retractable roof were incomplete.

For the 1976 Summer Olympics, a total of twenty-seven sports venues were used. Several venues used had been in existence before Montreal made its first Olympic bid in the late 1930s. By the 1950s, Montreal's bid for the Olympics shifted from Winter to Summer before it was finally awarded the 1976 Summer Games in 1970. Strikes in 1974 and 1975 affected construction of the Montreal Olympic Park, most notably the stadium, pool, and velodrome, to the point where the FINA President threatened to not have the diving, swimming, and water polo events take place there for the games in early 1976 though all three venues were completed as best as possible prior to the 1976 Games. 27 swimming world records were set as a result. The oldest stadium, Molson Stadium at McGill University, would be converted into artificial turf for the field hockey tournaments while the sailing program in Kingston, Ontario, would be held in freshwater, both for the first time in Summer Olympic history. Indoor track cycling took place at the Olympics for the first time at the velodrome. Once the Olympics finished, the Montreal Expos and Montreal Alouettes moved into Olympic Stadium, staying until 2004 and 1997, respectively. The Montreal Canadiens remained at the Montreal Forum until they moved to the Molson Centre in March 1996. In 1992, the velodrome was converted into an indoor zoo now known as the Montreal Biodôme. Île-Notre Dame hosted a canoe sprint world championships and two rowing world championships since the 1976 Games, but the area north of the basin on the island has been host to the Formula One Canadian Grand Prix on an almost annual basis since 1978.

== Venues ==
=== Montreal Olympic Park ===
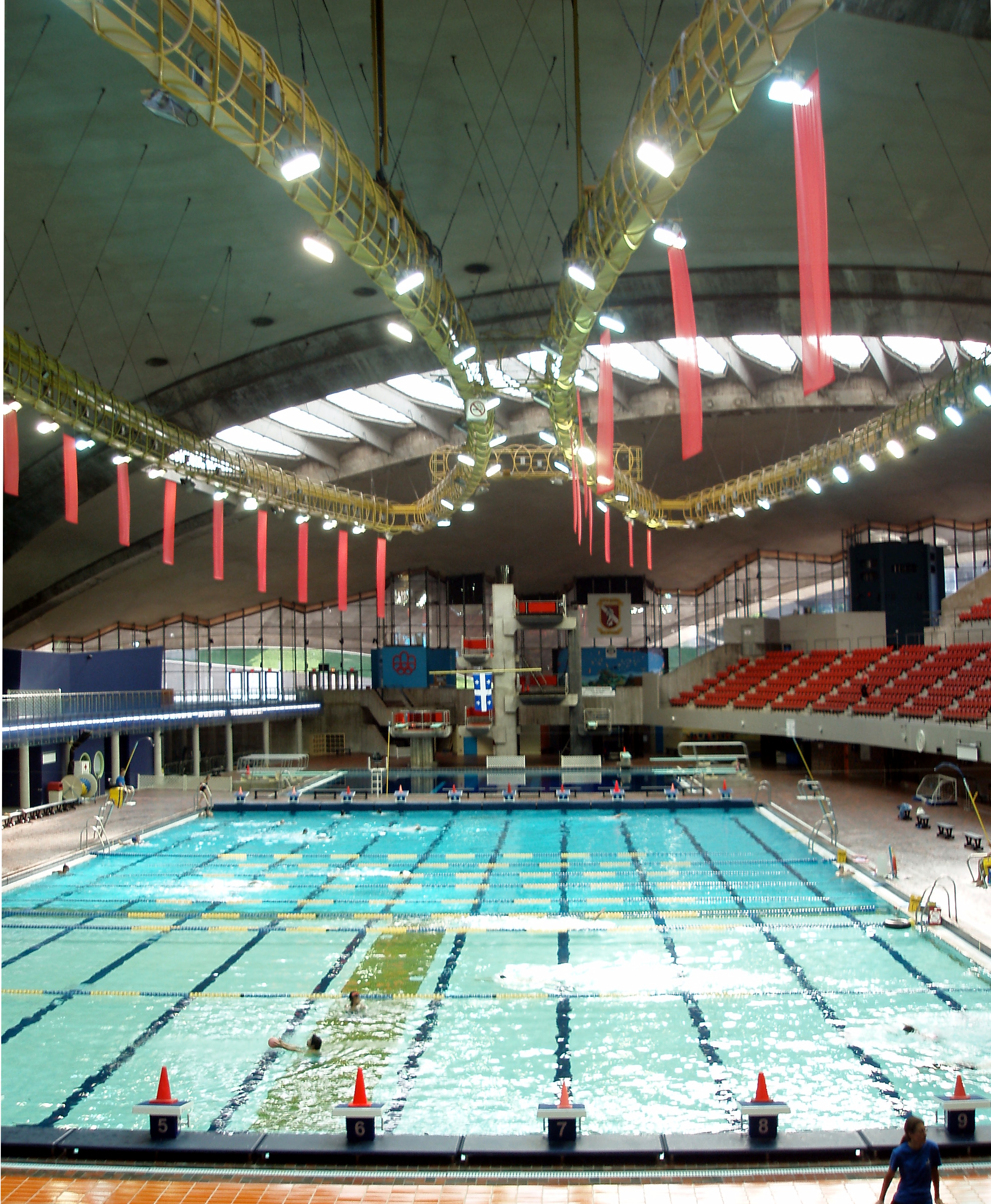
Montreal Olympic Pool in 2008.

Venue	Sports	Capacity	Ref.
Centre Pierre Charbonneau	Wrestling	2,738	
Maurice Richard Arena	Boxing, Wrestling	6,670	
Montreal Botanical Garden	Athletics (20 km walk), Modern pentathlon (running)	Not listed.	
Olympic Pool	Diving, Modern pentathlon (swimming), Swimming, Water polo (final)	9,220	
Olympic Stadium	Athletics, Ceremonies (opening/ closing), Equestrian (jumping team final), Football (final)	72,406	
Olympic Velodrome	Cycling (track), Judo	7,880	
Olympic Village	Competitor housing	9,517	

=== Greater Montreal ===
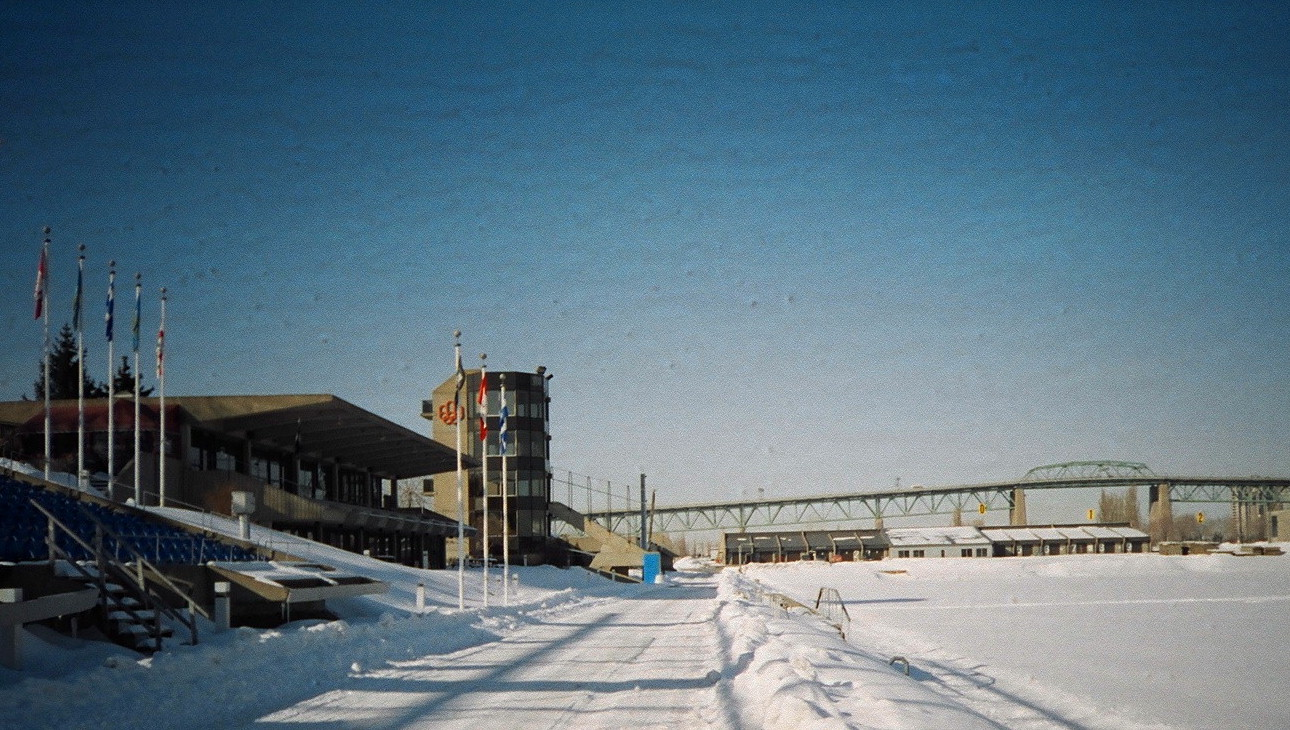
2006 picture of the canoeing-rowing basin with the finish tower on the left. West of the basin on the island is the Circuit Gilles Villeneuve.

Venue	Sports	Capacity	Ref.
Centre Étienne Desmarteau	Basketball preliminaries	4,548	
Complexe sportif Claude-Robillard	Handball, Water polo	2,733 (Water polo); 4,691 (Handball)	
Notre Dame Island	Canoeing, Rowing	30,610	
Molson Stadium, McGill University	Field hockey	18,324	
Montreal Forum	Basketball (final), Boxing (final), Gymnastics, Handball (men's medal matches), Volleyball (final)	18,575	
Mount Royal Park	Cycling (individual road race)	2,267	
Paul Sauvé Centre	Volleyball preliminaries	4,724	
Quebec Autoroute 40	Cycling (road team time trial)	257 (seats near finish line) free of charge along track side	
St. Michel Arena	Weightlifting	2,724	
Streets of Montreal	Athletics (marathon)	Not listed.	
Winter Stadium, Université de Montréal	Fencing, Modern pentathlon (fencing)	2,268	

=== Football venues ===
Venue	Location	Sports	Capacity	Ref.
Lansdowne Park	Ottawa	Football	30,065	
Sherbrooke Stadium	Sherbrooke	Football	10,111	
Varsity Stadium	Toronto	Football	21,651	

=== Handball venues ===
Venue	Location	Sports	Capacity	Ref.
Pavilion de l'éducation physique et des sports de l'Université Laval	Quebec City	Handball	3,778	
Sherbrooke Sports Palace	Sherbrooke	Handball	4,758	

=== Other venues ===
Venue	Location	Sports	Capacity	Ref.
Olympic Archery Field	Joliette	Archery	2,710	
Olympic Equestrian Centre	Bromont	Equestrian (all events but jumping team final), Modern pentathlon (riding)	25,000	
Olympic Shooting Range	L'Acadie	Modern pentathlon (shooting), Shooting	1,400	
Portsmouth Olympic Harbour	Kingston	Sailing	Not listed	

== Before the Olympics ==
Molson Stadium was constructed in 1915. It was home of the Canadian Football League (CFL)'s original Montreal Alouettes from 1954 to 1967. The only CFL Grey Cup ever held there was in 1931 and it was where the Montreal Wheeled Wingers defeated the Regina Roughriders (Saskatchewan since 1950 officially). The stadium was converted into artificial turf in 1975 in time for the field hockey competitions, the first time in Olympic history this happened.

Varsity Stadium was first built in 1898, with the first stadium being constructed in 1911. The stadium was renovated in 1950, and renovated a second time for the 1976 Games. It hosted the CFL Grey Cup a record 30 times between 1911 and 1957. The stadium served as host of the CFL's Toronto Argonauts from 1919 to 1958.

Landsdowne Park was first built in 1903, then rebuilt six years later following a boiler explosion at the park. It was reconstructed in 1967. The venue hosted the Grey Cup four times between 1925 and 1967.

The Forum was completed in 1924 and served as host to the National Hockey League (NHL)'s Montreal Maroons and later, Montreal Canadiens. It underwent a renovation in 1968. By the time of the 1976 Games, the then-defunct Maroons had won two Stanley Cups (they folded in 1938) while the Canadiens had won their then-record 18th Stanley Cup, including the 1975-6 season.

Notre Dame Island was created in 1963 and used as a venue for Expo 67 four years later. The Island underwent a renovation in 1974 to complete the canoeing and rowing basin used for the 1976 Games. It was completed in time for the test events in 1975.

Montreal itself bid for the Winter Olympics, first in 1944 (cancelled to World War II), and again in 1956. The city also lost out in its bid for the Summer Olympics in 1956 and 1972 before finally winning the 1976 Summer Olympics in 1970. Many venues were located within a 10 km (6.2 mi) radius of the Olympic Park. Three venues in the Olympic Park were new: Olympic Stadium, Olympic Pool, and Olympic Velodrome, while other venues both near the park and outside of Montreal in general had to be rebuilt, refurbished, and/or expanded to meet the needs of the 1976 Games.

Olympic Stadium was planned to be a retractable roof stadium, the first venue of its kind in the world. This ability was to come from the tower located above the stadium that would deploy when inclement weather occurred. Construction on the Stadium began in November 1973 with the complete sections of the stadium being complete between May 1975 and May 1976. A strike in November 1974 on stadium construction that lasted until January 1975 followed by another strike nine months later prevented completion of the tower and the retractable roof. It would result in the loss of 155 work-days at the Stadium by May 1976.

The strike at the stadium also affected construction at the Olympic Pool that was located adjacent to the stadium. In fact, FINA President Harold Henning commented on the facility construction in January 1976 that "Short of a miracle, the Olympic swimming, diving, and water polo competitions cannot be held in Montreal during the 1976 Games!". Henning's concern was reiterated at an International Olympic Committee meeting in Innsbruck one month later. The venue was completed in May in time for the Olympics.

The velodrome was constructed as an indoor venue out of necessity to Montreal's harsh winters, the first of its kind in the Olympics. Construction began in August 1973 and was completed in April 1976.

These Olympics became the first in the history of sailing to take place in freshwater since Kingston is located on the Great Lakes, specifically Lake Ontario. The part of the harbor used was reconstructed in 1974 in time for the 1976 Games.

== During the Olympics ==
An incomplete Olympic Stadium meant weather played a factor in many of the sporting events that took place. An example of this was in the men's high jump final where rain began when the height was at 7 ft 1.75 in (2.18 m) and was coming down so heavily at 7 ft 3 in (2.21 m) that large puddles formed in the high jump area. This forced world record holder Dwight Stones of the United States to grab a squeegee and start mopping up the mess himself. Other high jumpers joined Stones, including Canada's Greg Joy, to help mop up the area. Gold medalist Jacek Wszoła of Poland stated he won the high jump event when it started raining. Joy would win silver while Stones would win bronze in the event. The same hard rain that affected the men's high jump also affected the men's 4 × 400 m relay.

Heavy rain also affected the football final at Olympic Stadium where East Germany defeated Poland 3-1.

A strong and unpredictable headwind in the men's pole vault final affected the last man in the competition, David Roberts of the United States, and his attempt to clear 18 ft 4.5 in (5.60 m). Roberts missed at all three attempts and finished with a bronze.

Poor weather also affected the trap shooting event where Donald Haldeman of the United States won with a score of 190.

The pool itself produced a total of 27 swimming world records in 22 events during the Games.

In the opening heat of the canoeing K-1 1000 m event, changes in barometric pressure affected the sensitivity of the electronic scales to where it caused kayaks that were in spec on weight to be underweight. This led to the disqualifications of Italy's Oreste Perri, the co-world champion, and Romania's Vasile Dîba though both disqualifications were rescinded by the International Canoe Federation.

== After the Olympics ==
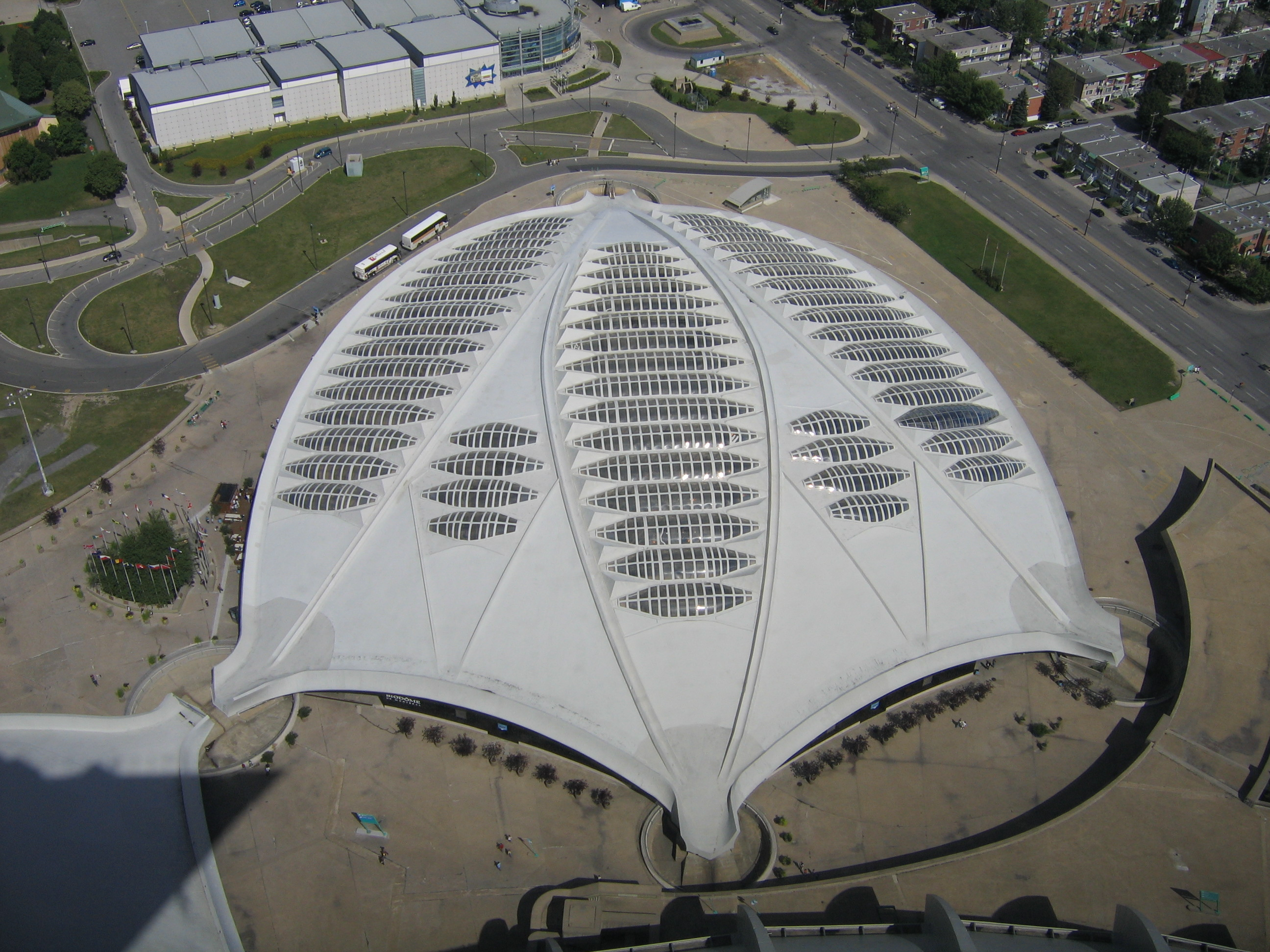
Montreal Biodôme in 2005. It was the Olympic Velodrome from 1976 until it was converted into the Biodôme in June 1992.

In 1977, Major League Baseball's (MLB) Montreal Expos moved into Olympic Stadium from their home at Jarry Park Stadium. Jarry Park was the Expos's home from their founding in 1969 until 1976. Olympic Stadium became the first venue outside of the United States to host the MLB All-Star Game in 1982. The same year that the Expos moved into Olympic Stadium also saw the CFL's Alouettes move into, where they would stay until 1981 when they went bankrupt. The Alouettes were sold to Montreal businessman Charles Bronfman in 1982 and renamed the Concordes until 1986, when they readopted the Alouettes name in 1987, then folded that same year. The CFL's American experiment of 1993–95, which saw the creation of the Baltimore Stallions in 1994, ended in failure; the Stallions, by far the most successful of the U.S. teams, moved to Montreal to be renamed the Alouettes. In 1991, Olympic Stadium was remodeled with 12,000 fewer seats for the Expos. A 55-ton structural element collapsed in September 1991, forcing the Expos to play two home games on the road. By 1998, the Alouettes moved from Olympic Stadium to Molson Stadium where they have remained to this day. The 1976 main venue also hosted the Grey Cup six times between 1977 and 2008. Olympic Stadium would finally have its inclined tower finished in full in 1987 along with the retractable roof. The roof however continued to give problems to the Olympic Stadium with it tearing apart. A replacement roof, which was fixed, started in 1997 and was finished in 1998. The last two seasons of the Expos were split between Montreal and San Juan, Puerto Rico, before they moved to Washington, D.C., in 2005 to become the Washington Nationals. Montreal's last baseball game was on 29 September 2004, a 9-1 loss to the defending World Series champion Florida Marlins.

The Forum would serve as home to the NHL Canadiens where they would win five more Stanley Cups between the 1976 Games and them moving to the Molson Centre (Bell Centre since 2002) during the 1995-96 NHL season. It was named a National Historic Site of Canada in 1997.

A feasibility study was done on the velodrome in 1988 to convert the venue into an indoor zoo. This was completed the following year with renovations commencing between 1989 and 1992. The venue, now known as the Montreal Biodôme, opened on 19 June 1992.

Île-Notre Dame serves multiple uses as of 2023. The canoeing and rowing basin has hosted World Rowing Championships special events in 1984 and 1992. The venue hosted the ICF Canoe Sprint World Championships in 1986. West of the basin on the island is Circuit Gilles Villeneuve which opened in 1978. The circuit has hosted the Formula One Canadian Grand Prix every year except 1987, 2009, and 2020.
