= List of Olympic medalists in football =

This is the complete list of Olympic medallists in football.

== Men ==
Games	Gold	Silver	Bronze
1896 Athens	not officially included in the Olympic program		
1900 Paris (Note: The International Olympic Committee credits Great Britain, France and Belgium with gold, silver and bronze medals respectively as part of its attempt to reconcile early Olympic Games with the modern award scheme.)	Great Britain (Note: Represented by Upton Park F.C.); James Jones; Claude Buckenham; William Gosling; Alfred Chalk; T. E. Burridge; William Quash; Richard Turner; F. G. Spackman; John Nicholas; Jack Zealley; Henry Haslam	France (Note: Represented by Club Français); Pierre Allemane; Louis Bach; Alfred Bloch; Fernand Canelle; Duparc; Eugène Fraysse; Virgile Gaillard; Georges Garnier; René Grandjean; Lucien Huteau; Marcel Lambert; Maurice Macaine; Gaston Peltier	Belgium (Note: Represented by Université de Bruxelles); Marius Delbecque; Hendrik van Heuckelum (NED); Raul Kelecom; Marcel Leboutte; Lucien Londot; Ernest Moreau de Melen; Edmond Neefs; Gustave Pelgrims; Alphonse Renier; Hilaire Spanoghe; Eric Thornton (GBR)
1904 St. Louis (Note: The International Olympic Committee awarded Canada with the gold medal and the United States with silver and bronze medals during the 1904 Games which were the first to utilize the modern award scheme.)	Canada (Note: Represented by Galt F.C.); George Ducker; John Fraser; John Gourlay; Alexander Hall; Albert Johnson; Robert Lane; Ernest Linton; Gordon McDonald; Frederick Steep; Tom Taylor; William Twaits; Otto Christman; Albert Henderson	United States (Note: Represented by Christian Brothers College); Charles Bartliff; Warren Brittingham; Oscar Brockmeyer; Alexander Cudmore; Charles January; John January; Thomas January; Raymond Lawler; Joseph Lydon; Louis Menges; Peter Ratican	United States (Note: Represented by St. Rose Parish); Joseph Brady; George Cooke; Thomas Cooke; Cormic Cosgrove; Edward Dierkes; Martin Dooling; Frank Frost; Claude Jameson; Henry Jameson: Johnson; Leo O'Connell; Harry Tate
1908 London	Great Britain; Horace Bailey; Arthur Berry; Frederick Chapman; Walter Corbett; Harold Hardman; Robert Hawkes; Kenneth Hunt; Herbert Smith; Harold Stapley; Clyde Purnell; Vivian Woodward George Barlow (Note: Those players were also in squad, but did not play any matches.); Albert Bell; Ronald Brebner; W. Crabtree; Walter Daffern; Thomas Porter; Albert Scothern	Denmark; Peter Marius Andersen; Harald Bohr; Charles Buchwald; Ludvig Drescher; Johannes Gandil; Harald Hansen; August Lindgren; Kristian Middelboe; Nils Middelboe; Sophus Nielsen; Oskar Nørland; Bjørn Rasmussen; Vilhelm Wolfhagen Magnus Beck; Ødbert E. Bjarnholt; Knud Hansen; Einar Middelboe	Netherlands; Reinier Beeuwkes; Frans de Bruyn Kops; Karel Heijting; Jan Kok; Bok de Korver; Emil Mundt; Louis Otten; Jops Reeman; Edu Snethlage; Ed Sol; Jan Thomée; Caius Welcker Jan van den Berg; Lo la Chapelle; Vic Gonsalves; John Heijning; Tonie van Renterghem
1912 Stockholm	Great Britain; Arthur Berry; Ronald Brebner; Thomas Burn; Joseph Dines; Edward Hanney; Gordon Hoare; Arthur Knight; Henry Littlewort; Ivan Sharpe; Harold Walden; Vivian Woodward Douglas McWhirter (Note: The database of the International Olympic Committee lists only the eleven players as medalists for each nation, who played in the first match for their nation. This list contains these eleven players, as well as all other players who made at least one appearance for their team during the tournament.); Harold Stamper; Gordon Wright	Denmark; Paul Berth; Charles Buchwald; Hjalmar Christoffersen; Harald Hansen; Sophus Hansen; Ivar Lykke; Nils Middelboe; Sophus Nielsen; Anthon Olsen; Axel Petersen; Vilhelm Wolfhagen Emil Jørgensen; Oskar Nørland; Poul Nielsen; Axel Thufason Svend Aage Castella; Ludvig Drescher; Axel Dyrberg; Viggo Malmquist; Christian Morville	Netherlands; Nico Bouvy; Huug de Groot; Bok de Korver; Nico de Wolf; Constant Feith; Just Göbel; Dirk Lotsy; Caesar ten Cate; Jan van Breda Kolff; Jan Vos; David Wijnveldt Piet Bouman; Joop Boutmy; Ge Fortgens; Jan van der Sluis
1920 Antwerp	Belgium; Félix Balyu; Désiré Bastin; Mathieu Bragard; Robert Coppée; Jean de Bie; André Fierens; Émile Hanse; Georges Hebdin; Louis Van Hege; Henri Larnoe; Joseph Musch; Fernand Nisot; Armand Swartenbroeks; Oscar Verbeeck	Spain; Patricio Arabolaza; Mariano Arrate; Juan Artola; José María Belauste; Sabino Bilbao; Agustín Eizaguirre; Ramón Equiazábal; Ramón Gil; Domingo Acedo; Silverio Izaguirre; Pichichi; Luis Otero; Francisco Pagazaurtundúa; José Samitier; Agustín Sancho; Félix Sesúmaga; Pedro Vallana; Joaquín Vázquez; Ricardo Zamora	Netherlands; Arie Bieshaar; Leo Bosschart; Evert Jan Bulder; Jaap Bulder; Harry Dénis; Jan van Dort; Ber Groosjohan; Felix von Heijden; Frits Kuipers; Dick MacNeill; Jan de Natris; Oscar van Rappard; Henk Steeman; Ben Verweij
1924 Paris	Uruguay; José Andrade; Pedro Arispe; Pedro Cea; Alfredo Ghierra; Andrés Mazali; José Nasazzi; José Naya; Pedro Petrone; Ángel Romano; Héctor Scarone; Humberto Tomasina; Antonio Urdinarán; Santos Urdinarán; José Vidal; Alfredo Zibechi Pedro Casella; Luis Chiappara; Pedro Etchegoyen; Zoilo Saldombide; Pascual Somma; Fermín Uriarte; Pedro Zingone	Switzerland; Max Abegglen; Félix Bédouret; Walter Dietrich; Karl Ehrenbolger; Paul Fässler; Edmond Kramer; Adolphe Mengotti; August Oberhauser; Robert Pache; Aron Pollitz; Hans Pulver; Rudolf Ramseyer; Adolphe Reymond; Paul Schmiedlin; Paul Sturzenegger Charles Bouvier; Gustav Gottenkieny; Jean Haag; Marcel Katz; Louis Richard; Teo Schär; Walter Weiler	Sweden; Axel Alfredsson; Charles Brommesson; Gustaf Carlsson; Albin Dahl; Sven Friberg; Fritjof Hillén; Konrad Hirsch; Gunnar Holmberg; Per Kaufeldt; Tore Keller; Rudolf Kock; Sigfrid Lindberg; Sven Lindqvist; Evert Lundqvist; Sten Mellgren; Sven Rydell; Harry Sundberg; Thorsten Svensson Karl Gustafsson; Vigor Lindberg; Gunnar Olsson; Robert Zander
1928 Amsterdam	Uruguay; José Andrade; Pedro Arispe; Juan Arremón; René Borjas; Antonio Campolo; Adhemar Canavesi; Héctor Castro; Pedro Cea; Lorenzo Fernández; Roberto Figueroa; Álvaro Gestido; Andrés Mazali; José Nasazzi; Pedro Petrone; Juan Píriz; Héctor Scarone; Santos Urdinarán Peregrino Anselmo; Venancio Bartibas; Fausto Batignani; Ángel Melogno; Domingo Tejera	Argentina; Ludovico Bidoglio; Ángel Bossio; Saúl Calandra; Adolfo Carricaberry; Roberto Cherro; Octavio Díaz; Juan Evaristo; Manuel Ferreira; Enrique Gainzarain; Ángel Médici; Luis Monti; Rodolfo Orlandini; Raimundo Orsi; Fernando Paternoster; Feliciano Perducca; Domingo Tarasconi Alfredo Helman; Segundo Luna; Pedro Ochoa; Natalio Perinetti; Luis Weihmuller; Adolfo Zumelzú	Italy; Adolfo Baloncieri; Elvio Banchero; Delfo Bellini; Fulvio Bernardini; Umberto Caligaris; Giampiero Combi; Giovanni De Prà; Pietro Genovesi; Antonio Janni; Virgilio Levratto; Mario Magnozzi; Silvio Pietroboni; Alfredo Pitto; Enrico Rivolta; Virginio Rosetta; Gino Rossetti; Angelo Schiavio Valentino Degani; Attilio Ferraris; Felice Gasperi; Pietro Pastore; Andrea Viviano
1932 Los Angeles	not included in the Olympic program		
1936 Berlin	Italy; Giuseppe Baldo; Sergio Bertoni; Carlo Biagi; Giulio Cappelli; Alfredo Foni; Annibale Frossi; Francesco Gabriotti; Ugo Locatelli; Libero Marchini; Alfonso Negro; Achille Piccini; Pietro Rava; Luigi Scarabello; Bruno Venturini	Austria; Franz Fuchsberger; Max Hofmeister; Eduard Kainberger; Karl Kainberger; Martin Kargl; Josef Kitzmüller; Anton Krenn; Ernst Künz; Adolf Laudon; Franz Mandl; Klement Steinmetz; Karl Wahlmüller; Walter Werginz	Norway; Arne Brustad; Nils Eriksen; Odd Frantzen; Sverre Hansen; Rolf Holmberg; Øivind Holmsen; Fredrik Horn; Magnar Isaksen; Henry Johansen; Jørgen Juve; Reidar Kvammen; Alf Martinsen; Magdalon Monsen; Frithjof Ulleberg
1948 London	Sweden; Torsten Lindberg; Karl Svensson; Knut Nordahl; Erik Nilsson; Birger Rosengren; Bertil Nordahl; Sune Andersson; Gunnar Gren; Gunnar Nordahl; Henry Carlsson; Nils Liedholm; Barje Leander	Yugoslavia; Franjo Šoštarić; Miroslav Brozović; Branko Stanković; Zlatko Čajkovski; Miodrag Jovanović; Aleksandar Atanacković; Prvoslav Mihajlović; Rajko Mitić; Franjo Wölfl; Stjepan Bobek; Željko Čajkovski; Kosta Tomašević; Ljubomir Lovrić; Zvonimir Cimermančić; Bernard Vukas	Denmark; John Hansen; Karl Aage Hansen; Ivan Jensen; Viggo Jensen; Knud Lundberg; Eigil Nielsen; Knud Børge Overgaard; Axel Pilmark; Johannes Pløger; Carl Aage Præst; Holger Seebach; Jørgen Leschly Sørensen; Dion Ørnvold Knud Bastrup-Birk; Hans Colberg; Edvin Hansen; Jørgen W. Hansen; Erik Kuld Jensen; Ove Jensen; Per Knudsen; Poul Petersen; Erling Sørensen
1952 Helsinki	Hungary; Gyula Grosics; Jenő Dalnoki; Mihály Lantos; Imre Kovács; Gyula Lóránt; József Bozsik; László Budai; Sándor Kocsis; Nándor Hidegkuti; Ferenc Puskás; Zoltán Czibor; Jenő Buzánszky; József Zakariás; Lajos Csordás; Péter Palotás	Yugoslavia; Vladimir Beara; Branko Stanković; Tomislav Crnković; Zlatko Čajkovski; Ivan Horvat; Vujadin Boškov; Tihomir Ognjanov; Rajko Mitić; Bernard Vukas; Stjepan Bobek; Branko Zebec	Sweden; Karl Svensson; Lennart Samuelsson; Erik Nilsson; Holger Hansson; Bengt Gustavsson; Gösta Lindh; Sylve Bengtsson; Gösta Löfgren; Ingvar Rydell; Yngve Brodd; Gösta Sandberg; Olof Ahlund
1956 Melbourne	Soviet Union; Lev Yashin; Nikolai Tishchenko; Mikhail Ogonkov; Aleksei Paramonov; Anatoli Bashashkin; Igor Netto; Boris Tatushin; Anatoli Isayev; Eduard Streltsov; Valentin Ivanov; Vladimir Ryzhkin; Boris Kuznetsov; Yozhef Betsa; Sergei Salnikov; Boris Razinsky; Anatoli Maslyonkin; Anatoli Ilyin; Nikita Simonyan	Yugoslavia; Petar Radenković; Mladen Koščak; Nikola Radović; Ivan Šantek; Ljubiša Spajić; Dobrosav Krstić; Dragoslav Šekularac; Zlatko Papec; Sava Antić; Todor Veselinović; Muhamed Mujić; Blagoje Vidinić; Ibrahim Biogradlić; Luka Lipošinović	Bulgaria; Stefan Bozhkov; Georgi Naydenov; Kiril Rakarov; Manol Manolov; Nikola Kovachev; Panayot Panayotov; Ivan Kolev; Krum Yanev; Gavril Stoyanov; Todor Diev; Yosif Yosifov; Georgi Dimitrov; Milcho Goranov; Dimitar Milanov
1960 Rome	Yugoslavia; Andrija Anković; Vladimir Durković; Milan Galić; Fahrudin Jusufi; Tomislav Knez; Bora Kostić; Aleksandar Kozlina; Dušan Maravić; Željko Matuš; Željko Perušić; Novak Roganović; Velimir Sombolac; Milutin Šoškić; Silvester Takač; Blagoje Vidinić; Ante Žanetić	Denmark; Poul Andersen; John Danielsen; Henning Enoksen; Henry From; Bent Hansen; Poul Jensen; Hans Christian Nielsen; Harald Nielsen; Flemming Nielsen; Poul Pedersen; Jørn Sørensen; Tommy Troelsen; Erik Gaardhøje; Jørgen Hansen; Henning Helbrandt; Bent Krog; Erling Linde Larsen; Poul Mejer; Finn Sterobo	Hungary; Flórian Albert; Jenő Dálnoki; Zoltán Dudás; János Dunai; Lajos Faragó; János Göröcs; Ferenc Kovács; Dezső Novák; Pál Orosz; László Pál; Tibor Pál; Gyula Rákosi; Imre Sátori; Ernő Solymosi; Gábor Török; Pál Várhidi; Oszkár Vilezsál
1964 Tokyo	Hungary; Ferenc Bene; Tibor Csernai; János Farkas; József Gelei; Kálmán Ihász; Sándor Katona; Imre Komora; Ferenc Nógrádi; Dezső Novák; Árpád Orbán; Károly Palotai; Antal Szentmihályi; Gusztáv Szepesi; Zoltán Varga	Czechoslovakia; Jan Brumovský; Ludovít Cvetler; Ján Geleta; František Knebort; Karel Knesl; Karel Lichtnégl; Vojtech Masný; Štefan Matlák; Ivan Mráz; Karel Nepomucký; Zdeněk Pičman; František Schmucker; Anton Švajlen; Anton Urban; František Valošek; Josef Vojta; Vladimír Weiss	United Team of Germany; Gerd Backhaus; Wolfgang Barthels; Bernd Bauchspieß; Gerhard Körner; Otto Fräßdorf; Henning Frenzel; Dieter Engelhardt; Herbert Pankau; Manfred Geisler; Jürgen Heinsch; Klaus Lisiewicz; Jürgen Nöldner; Peter Rock; Klaus-Dieter Seehaus; Hermann Stöcker; Werner Unger; Klaus Urbanczyk; Eberhard Vogel; Manfred Walter; Horst Weigang
1968 Mexico City	Hungary; István Básti; Antal Dunai; Lajos Dunai; Ernő Noskó; Dezső Novák; Károly Fatér; László Fazekas; István Juhász; László Keglovich; Lajos Kocsis; Iván Menczel; László Nagy; Miklós Páncsics; István Sárközi; Lajos Szűcs; Zoltán Szarka; Miklós Szalay	Bulgaria; Stoyan Yordanov; Atanas Gerov; Georgi Hristakiev; Milko Gaydarski; Kiril Ivkov; Ivaylo Georgiev; Tsvetan Dimitrov; Evgeni Yanchovski; Petar Zhekov; Atanas Hhristov; Asparuh Donev; Kiril Hristov; Georgi Tsvetkov; Todor Nikolov; Yancho Dimitrov; Ivan Zafirov; Mihail Gyonin; Georgi Vasilev	Japan; Kenzo Yokoyama; Hiroshi Katayama; Masakatsu Miyamoto; Yoshitada Yamaguchi; Mitsuo Kamata; Ryozo Suzuki; Kiyoshi Tomizawa; Takaji Mori; Aritatsu Ogi; Eizo Yuguchi; Shigeo Yaegashi; Teruki Miyamoto; Masashi Watanabe; Yasuyuki Kuwahara; Kunishige Kamamoto; Ikuo Matsumoto; Ryuichi Sugiyama; Masahiro Hamazaki
1972 Munich	Poland; Hubert Kostka; Zbigniew Gut; Jerzy Gorgoń; Zygmunt Anczok; Lesław Ćmikiewicz; Zygmunt Maszczyk; Jerzy Kraska; Kazimierz Deyna; Zygfryd Szołtysik; Włodzimierz Lubański; Robert Gadocha; Ryszard Szymczak; Antoni Szymanowski; Joachim Marx; Grzegorz Lato; Marian Ostafiński; Kazimierz Kmiecik	Hungary; István Géczi; Péter Vépi; Miklós Páncsics; Péter Juhász; Lajos Szűcs; Mihály Kozma; Antal Dunai; Lajos Kű; Béla Váradi; Ede Dunai; László Bálint; Lajos Kocsis; Kálmán Tóth; László Branikovits; József Kovács; Csaba Vidács; Adám Rothermel	Soviet Union; Oleg Blokhin; Murtaz Khurtsilava; Yuriy Istomin; Vladimir Kaplichny; Viktor Kolotov; Evgeny Lovchev; Sergei Olshansky; Evhen Rudakov; Vyacheslav Semyonov; Gennady Yevriuzhikin; Oganes Zanazanyan; Andrei Yakubik; Arkady Andreasyan; Revaz Dzodzuashvili; Yozhef Sabo; Yuri Yeliseyev; Vladimir Onischenko; Anatoliy Kuksov; Vladimir Pilguy
1972 Munich	Poland; Hubert Kostka; Zbigniew Gut; Jerzy Gorgoń; Zygmunt Anczok; Lesław Ćmikiewicz; Zygmunt Maszczyk; Jerzy Kraska; Kazimierz Deyna; Zygfryd Szołtysik; Włodzimierz Lubański; Robert Gadocha; Ryszard Szymczak; Antoni Szymanowski; Joachim Marx; Grzegorz Lato; Marian Ostafiński; Kazimierz Kmiecik	Hungary; István Géczi; Péter Vépi; Miklós Páncsics; Péter Juhász; Lajos Szűcs; Mihály Kozma; Antal Dunai; Lajos Kű; Béla Váradi; Ede Dunai; László Bálint; Lajos Kocsis; Kálmán Tóth; László Branikovits; József Kovács; Csaba Vidács; Adám Rothermel	East Germany; Jürgen Croy; Manfred Zapf; Konrad Weise; Bernd Bransch; Jürgen Pommerenke; Jürgen Sparwasser; Hans-Jürgen Kreische; Joachim Streich; Wolfgang Seguin; Peter Ducke; Frank Ganzera; Lothar Kurbjuweit; Eberhard Vogel; Harald Irmscher; Ralf Schulenberg; Reinhard Häfner; Siegmar Watzlich
1976 Montreal	East Germany; Hans-Ulrich Grapenthin; Wilfried Gröbner; Jürgen Croy; Gerd Weber; Hans-Jürgen Dörner; Konrad Weise; Lothar Kurbjuweit; Reinhard Lauck; Gert Heidler; Reinhard Häfner; Hans-Jürgen Riediger; Bernd Bransch; Martin Hoffmann; Gerd Kische; Wolfram Löwe; Hartmut Schade; Dieter Riedel	Poland; Jan Tomaszewski; Piotr Mowlik; Antoni Szymanowski; Jerzy Gorgoń; Wojciech Rudy; Władysław Żmuda; Zygmunt Maszczyk; Henryk Kasperczak; Roman Ogaza; Kazimierz Kmiecik; Kazimierz Deyna; Andrzej Szarmach; Henryk Wieczorek; Lesław Ćmikiewicz; Jan Benigier	Soviet Union; Vladimir Astapovsky; Anatoly Konjkov; Viktor Matvienko; Mykhailo Fomenko; Stefan Reshko; Vladimir Troshkin; David Kipiani; Vladimir Onischenko; Viktor Kolotov; Vladimir Veremeev; Oleg Blokhin; Leonid Buryak; Vladimir Fyodorov; Aleksandr Minayev; Viktor Zvyagintsev; Leonid Nazarenko; Aleksandr Prokhorov
1980 Moscow	Czechoslovakia; Stanislav Seman; Luděk Macela; Josef Mazura; Libor Radimec; Zdeněk Rygel; Petr Němec; Ladislav Vízek; Jan Berger; Jindřich Svoboda; Lubomír Pokluda; Verner Lička; Rostislav Václavíček; Jaroslav Netolička; Oldřich Rott; František Štambachr; František Kunzo	East Germany; Bodo Rudwaleit; Artur Ullrich; Lothar Hause; Frank Uhlig; Frank Baum; Rudiger Schnuphase; Frank Terletzki; Wolfgang Steinbach; Jurgen Bahringer; Werner Peter; Dieter Kühn; Norbert Trieloff; Matthias Müller; Matthias Liebers; Bernd Jakubowski; Wolf-Rudiger Netz	Soviet Union; Rinat Dasayev; Tengiz Sulakvelidze; Aleksandr Chivadze; Vagiz Khidiyatullin; Oleg Romantsev; Sergey Shavlo; Sergey Andreyev; Volodymyr Bezsonov; Yuri Gavrilov; Fyodor Cherenkov; Valery Gazzaev; Vladimir Pilguy; Sergej Baltacha; Sergei Nikulin; Khoren Hovhannisyan; Aleksandr Prokopenko
1984 Los Angeles	France; William Ayache; Michel Bensoussan; Michel Bibard; Dominique Bijotat; François Brisson; Patrick Cubaynes; Patrice Garande; Philippe Jeannol; Guy Lacombe; Jean-Claude Lemoult; Jean-Philippe Rohr; Albert Rust; Didier Sénac; Jean-Christophe Thouvenel; José Touré; Daniel Xuereb; Jean-Louis Zanon	Brazil; Pinga; Davi; Milton Cruz; Luís Henrique Dias; André Luís; Mauro Galvão; Tonho; Kita; Gilmar Popoca; Silvinho; Gilmar; Ademir; Paulo Santos; Ronaldo Silva; Dunga; Chicão; Luiz Carlos Winck	Yugoslavia; Mirsad Baljić; Mehmed Baždarević; Vlado Čapljić; Borislav Cvetković; Stjepan Deverić; Milko Djurovski; Marko Elsner; Nenad Gračan; Tomislav Ivković; Srečko Katanec; Branko Miljuš; Mitar Mrkela; Jovica Nikolić; Ivan Pudar; Ljubomir Radanović; Admir Smajić; Dragan Stojković
1988 Seoul	Soviet Union; Dmitri Kharine; Gela Ketashvili; Igor Sklyarov; Oleksiy Cherednyk; Arvydas Janonis; Vadym Tyshchenko; Yevgeni Kuznetsov; Igor Ponomaryov; Aleksandr Borodyuk; Igor Dobrovolski; Volodymyr Lyutyi; Evgeny Yarovenko; Sergei Fokin; Vladimir Tatarchuk; Oleksiy Mykhaylychenko; Aleksei Prudnikov; Viktor Losev; Sergei Gorlukovich; Yuri Savichev; Arminas Narbekovas	Brazil; Ademir; Aloísio; Andrade; Batista; Bebeto; Careca; André Cruz; Edmar; Geovani; João Paulo; Jorginho; Milton; Neto; Romário; Cláudio Taffarel; Luiz Carlos Winck; Ricardo Gomes; Mazinho; Valdo Filho; Zé Carlos	West Germany; Oliver Reck; Michael Schulz; Armin Görtz; Wolfgang Funkel; Thomas Hörster; Olaf Janßen; Rudi Bommer; Holger Fach; Jürgen Klinsmann; Wolfram Wuttke; Frank Mill; Uwe Kamps; Roland Grahammer; Thomas Häßler; Christian Schreier; Fritz Walter; Ralf Sievers; Gerhard Kleppinger; Karlheinz Riedle; Gunnar Sauer
1992 Barcelona	Spain; José Amavisca; Rafael Berges; Santiago Cañizares; Abelardo; Albert Ferrer; Pep Guardiola; Miguel Hernández; Toni; Mikel Lasa; Juanma López; Javier Manjarín; Luis Enrique; Kiko Narváez; Alfonso; Antonio Pinilla; Paco Soler; Gabriel Vidal; Roberto Solozábal; David Villabona; Francisco Veza	Poland; Dariusz Adamczuk; Marek Bajor; Jerzy Brzęczek; Marek Koźmiński; Dariusz Gęsior; Marcin Jałocha; Tomasz Łapiński; Tomasz Wałdoch; Aleksander Kłak; Andrzej Kobylański; Ryszard Staniek; Wojciech Kowalczyk; Andrzej Juskowiak; Grzegorz Mielcarski; Piotr Świerczewski; Mirosław Walogóra; Dariusz Koseła; Arkadiusz Onyszko; Dariusz Szubert; Tomasz Wieszczycki	Ghana; Joachin Yaw Acheampong; Simon Addo; Sammi Adjei; Maxwell Konadu; Mamood Amadu; Isaac Asare; Frank Amankwah; Nii Lamptey; Bernard Aryee; Kwame Ayew; Mohammed Gargo; Mohammed Kalilu; Ibrahim Dossey; Samuel Osei Kuffour; Samuel Kumah; Anthony Mensah; Alex Nyarko; Yaw Preko; Shamo Quaye; Oli Rahman
1996 Atlanta	Nigeria; Daniel Amokachi; Emmanuel Amunike; Tijani Babangida; Celestine Babayaro; Emmanuel Babayaro; Teslim Fatusi; Victor Ikpeba; Dosu Joseph; Nwankwo Kanu; Garba Lawal; Abiodun Obafemi; Kingsley Obiekwu; Uche Okechukwu; Jay-Jay Okocha; Sunday Oliseh; Mobi Oparaku; Wilson Oruma; Taribo West	Argentina; Matías Almeyda; Roberto Ayala; Christian Bassedas; Carlos Bossio; Pablo Cavallero; José Chamot; Hernán Crespo; Marcelo Delgado; Marcelo Gallardo; Claudio López; Gustavo López; Hugo Morales; Ariel Ortega; Pablo Paz; Mauricio Pineda; Roberto Sensini; Diego Simeone; Javier Zanetti	Brazil; Dida; Zé María; Aldair; Ronaldo Guiaro; Flávio Conceição; Roberto Carlos; Bebeto; Amaral; Ronaldo; Rivaldo; Sávio; Danrlei; Narciso; André Luiz; Zé Elias; Marcelinho; Luizão; Juninho
2000 Sydney	Cameroon; Samuel Eto'o; Serge Mimpo; Clément Beaud; Aaron Nguimbat; Joël Epalle; Modeste M'bami; Patrice Abanda; Nicolas Alnoudji; Daniel Bekono; Serge Branco; Lauren; Carlos Kameni; Patrick M'Boma; Albert Meyong; Daniel N'Gom Kome; Geremi; Patrick Suffo; Pierre Womé	Spain; David Albelda; Iván Amaya; Miguel Ángel Angulo; Daniel Aranzubia; Joan Capdevila; Jordi Ferrón; Gabri; Xavi; Jesús Lacruz; Albert Luque; Carlos Marchena; Felip Ortiz; Carles Puyol; José María Romero; Ismael Ruiz; Raúl Tamudo; Toni Velamazán; Unai Vergara	Chile; Pedro Reyes; Nelson Tapia; Iván Zamorano; Javier di Gregorio; Cristian Álvarez; Francisco Arrué; Pablo Contreras; Sebastián González; David Henríquez; Manuel Ibarra; Claudio Maldonado; Reinaldo Navia; Rodrigo Núñez; Rafael Olarra; Patricio Ormazábal; David Pizarro; Rodrigo Tello; Mauricio Rojas
2004 Athens	Argentina; Germán Lux; Willy Caballero; Roberto Ayala; Fabricio Coloccini; Gabriel Heinze; Clemente Rodríguez; Leandro Fernández; Javier Mascherano; Kily González; Andrés D'Alessandro; Lucho González; Nicolás Medina; César Delgado; Carlos Tevez; Mauro Rosales; Javier Saviola; Mariano González; Luciano Figueroa	Paraguay; Rodrigo Romero; Emilio Martínez; Julio Manzur; Carlos Gamarra; José Devaca; Celso Esquivel; Pablo Giménez; Edgar Barreto; Fredy Barreiro; Diego Figueredo; Aureliano Torres; Pedro Benitez; Julio César Enciso; Julio González; Ernesto Cristaldo; Osvaldo Díaz; José Cardozo; Diego Barreto	Italy; Ivan Pelizzoli; Marco Amelia; Emiliano Moretti; Matteo Ferrari; Andrea Barzagli; Cesare Bovo; Giorgio Chiellini; Daniele Bonera; Giampiero Pinzi; Angelo Palombo; Andrea Pirlo; Daniele De Rossi; Marco Donadel; Alberto Gilardino; Simone Del Nero; Giuseppe Sculli; Andrea Gasbarroni; Giandomenico Mesto
2008 Beijing	Argentina; Óscar Ustari; Ezequiel Garay; Fabián Monzón; Pablo Zabaleta; Fernando Gago; Federico Fazio; José Sosa; Éver Banega; Ezequiel Lavezzi; Juan Román Riquelme; Ángel Di María; Nicolás Pareja; Lautaro Acosta; Javier Mascherano; Lionel Messi; Sergio Agüero; Diego Buonanotte; Sergio Romero; Nicolas Navarro	Nigeria; Ambruse Vanzekin; Chibuzor Okonkwo; Onyekachi Apam; Dele Adeleye; Monday James; Chinedu Obasi; Sani Kaita; Victor Obinna; Promise Isaac; Solomon Okoronkwo; Oluwafemi Ajilore; Olubayo Adefemi; Peter Odemwingie; Efe Ambrose; Victor Anichebe; Emmanuel Ekpo; Ikechukwu Ezenwa; Oladapo Olufemi	Brazil; Diego Alves; Renan; Rafinha; Alex Silva; Thiago Silva; Marcelo; Ilsinho; Breno; Hernanes; Anderson; Lucas Leiva; Ronaldinho; Ramires; Diego; Thiago Neves; Alexandre Pato; Rafael Sóbis; Jô
2012 London	Mexico; José Corona; Israel Jiménez; Carlos Salcido; Hiram Mier; Dárvin Chávez; Héctor Herrera; Javier Cortés; Marco Fabián; Oribe Peralta; Giovani dos Santos; Javier Aquino; Raúl Jiménez; Diego Reyes; Jorge Enríquez; Néstor Vidrio; Miguel Ángel Ponce; Néstor Araujo; José Antonio Rodríguez	Brazil; Gabriel; Rafael; Thiago Silva; Juan Jesus; Sandro; Marcelo; Lucas Moura; Rômulo; Leandro Damião; Oscar; Neymar; Hulk; Bruno Uvini; Danilo; Alex Sandro; Ganso; Alexandre Pato; Neto	South Korea; Jung Sung-ryong; Oh Jae-suk; Yun Suk-young; Kim Young-gwon; Kim Kee-hee; Ki Sung-yueng; Kim Bo-kyung; Baek Sung-dong; Ji Dong-won; Park Chu-young; Nam Tae-hee; Hwang Seok-ho; Koo Ja-cheol; Kim Chang-soo; Park Jong-Woo; Jung Woo-young; Kim Hyun-sung; Lee Bum-young
2016 Rio de Janeiro	Brazil; Weverton; Zeca; Rodrigo Caio; Marquinhos; Renato Augusto; Douglas Santos; Luan; Rafinha; Gabriel; Neymar; Gabriel Jesus; Walace; William; Luan Garcia; Rodrigo Dourado; Thiago Maia; Felipe Anderson; Uilson	Germany; Timo Horn; Jeremy Toljan; Lukas Klostermann; Matthias Ginter; Niklas Süle; Sven Bender; Max Meyer; Lars Bender; Davie Selke; Leon Goretzka; Julian Brandt; Jannik Huth; Philipp Max; Robert Bauer; Max Christiansen; Grischa Prömel; Serge Gnabry; Nils Petersen; Eric Oelschlägel	Nigeria; Daniel Akpeyi; Muenfuh Sincere; Kingsley Madu; Shehu Abdullahi; Saturday Erimuya; William Troost-Ekong; Aminu Umar; Oghenekaro Etebo; Imoh Ezekiel; Mikel John Obi; Junior Ajayi; Popoola Saliu; Umar Sadiq; Azubuike Okechukwu; Ndifreke Udo; Stanley Amuzie; Usman Mohammed; Emmanuel Daniel
2020 Tokyo	Brazil; Santos; Gabriel Menino; Diego Carlos; Ricardo Graça; Douglas Luiz; Guilherme Arana; Paulinho; Bruno Guimarães; Matheus Cunha; Richarlison; Antony; Brenno; Dani Alves; Bruno Fuchs; Nino; Abner Vinícius; Malcom; Matheus Henrique; Reinier; Claudinho; Gabriel Martinelli; Lucão	Spain; Unai Simón; Óscar Mingueza; Marc Cucurella; Pau Torres; Jesús Vallejo; Martín Zubimendi; Marco Asensio; Mikel Merino; Rafa Mir; Dani Ceballos; Mikel Oyarzabal; Eric García; Álvaro Fernández; Carlos Soler; Jon Moncayola; Pedri; Javi Puado; Óscar Gil; Dani Olmo; Juan Miranda; Bryan Gil; Iván Villar	Mexico; Luis Malagón; Jorge Sánchez; César Montes; Jesús Alberto Angulo; Johan Vásquez; Vladimir Loroña; Luis Romo; Carlos Rodríguez; Henry Martín; Diego Lainez; Alexis Vega; Adrián Mora; Guillermo Ochoa; Érick Aguirre; Uriel Antuna; José Joaquín Esquivel; Sebastián Córdova; Eduardo Aguirre; Ricardo Angulo; Fernando Beltrán; Roberto Alvarado; Sebastián Jurado
2024 Paris	Spain; Arnau Tenas; Marc Pubill; Juan Miranda; Eric García; Pau Cubarsí; Pablo Barrios; Diego López; Beñat Turrientes; Abel Ruiz; Álex Baena; Fermín López; Jon Pacheco; Joan García; Aimar Oroz; Miguel Gutiérrez; Adrián Bernabé; Sergio Gómez; Samu Omorodion; Cristhian Mosquera; Juanlu; Sergio Camello; Alejandro Iturbe	France; Obed Nkambadio; Castello Lukeba; Adrien Truffert; Loïc Badé; Kiliann Sildillia; Manu Koné; Michael Olise; Maghnes Akliouche; Arnaud Kalimuendo; Alexandre Lacazette; Désiré Doué; Enzo Millot; Joris Chotard; Jean-Philippe Mateta; Bradley Locko; Guillaume Restes; Soungoutou Magassa; Rayan Cherki; Chrislain Matsima; Andy Diouf; Johann Lepenant	Morocco; Munir Mohamedi; Achraf Hakimi; Akram Nakach; Mehdi Boukamir; Adil Tahif; Benjamin Bouchouari; Eliesse Ben Seghir; Bilal El Khannous; Soufiane Rahimi; Ilias Akhomach; Zakaria El Ouahdi; Rachid Ghanimi; Yassine Kechta; Oussama Targhalline; El Mehdi Maouhoub; Abde Ezzalzouli; Oussama El Azzouzi; Amir Richardson; Haytam Manaout
2028 Los Angeles			
2032 Brisbane			

== Women ==
Games	Gold	Silver	Bronze
1996 Atlanta	United States; Mary Harvey; Cindy Parlow; Carla Overbeck; Tiffany Roberts; Brandi Chastain; Staci Wilson; Shannon MacMillan; Mia Hamm; Michelle Akers-Stahl; Julie Foudy; Carin Gabarra; Kristine Lilly; Joy Fawcett; Tisha Venturini; Tiffeny Milbrett; Briana Scurry	China; Zhong Honglian; Wang Liping; Fan Yunjie; Yu Hongqi; Xie Huilin; Zhao Lihong; Wei Haiying; Shui Qingxia; Sun Wen; Liu Ailing; Sun Qingmei; Wen Lirong; Liu Ying; Chen Yufeng; Shi Guihong; Gao Hong	Norway; Bente Nordby; Agnete Carlsen; Gro Espeseth; Nina Nymark Andersen; Merete Myklebust; Hege Riise; Anne Nymark Andersen; Heidi Støre; Marianne Pettersen; Linda Medalen; Brit Sandaune; Kjersti Thun; Tina Svensson; Tone Haugen; Trine Tangeraas; Ann-Kristin Aarønes; Tone Gunn Frustøl; Reidun Seth; Ingrid Sternhoff
2000 Sydney	Norway; Gro Espeseth; Bente Nordby; Marianne Pettersen; Hege Riise; Kristin Bekkevold; Ragnhild Gulbrandsen; Solveig Gulbrandsen; Margunn Haugenes; Ingeborg Hovland; Christine Bøe Jensen; Silje Jørgensen; Monica Knudsen; Gøril Kringen; Unni Lehn; Dagny Mellgren; Anita Rapp; Brit Sandaune; Bente Kvitland	United States; Brandi Chastain; Joy Fawcett; Julie Foudy; Mia Hamm; Kristine Lilly; Tiffeny Milbrett; Carla Overbeck; Cindy Parlow; Briana Scurry; Lorrie Fair; Shannon MacMillan; Siri Mullinix; Christie Pearce; Nikki Serlenga; Danielle Slaton; Kate Sobrero; Sara Whalen	Germany; Ariane Hingst; Melanie Hoffmann; Steffi Jones; Renate Lingor; Maren Meinert; Sandra Minnert; Claudia Mueller; Birgit Prinz; Silke Rottenberg; Kerstin Stegemann; Bettina Wiegmann; Tina Wunderlich; Nicole Brandebusemeyer; Nadine Angerer; Doris Fitschen; Jeannette Goette; Stefanie Gottschlich; Inka Grings
2004 Athens	United States; Briana Scurry; Heather Mitts; Christie Rampone; Cat Reddick; Lindsay Tarpley; Brandi Chastain; Shannon Boxx; Angela Hucles; Mia Hamm; Aly Wagner; Julie Foudy; Cindy Parlow; Kristine Lilly; Joy Fawcett; Kate Markgraf; Abby Wambach; Heather O'Reilly; Kristin Luckenbill	Brazil; Andréia; Maravilha; Mônica; Tânia; Juliana; Daniela; Rosana; Renata Costa; Aline; Formiga; Elaine; Maycon; Pretinha; Marta; Cristiane; Roseli; Dayane; Grazielle	Germany; Silke Rottenberg; Kerstin Stegemann; Kerstin Garefrekes; Steffi Jones; Sarah Günther; Viola Odebrecht; Pia Wunderlich; Petra Wimbersky; Birgit Prinz; Renate Lingor; Martina Müller; Navina Omilade; Sandra Minnert; Isabell Bachor; Sonja Fuss; Conny Pohlers; Ariane Hingst; Nadine Angerer
2008 Beijing	United States; Hope Solo; Heather Mitts; Christie Rampone; Rachel Buehler; Lindsay Tarpley; Natasha Kai; Shannon Boxx; Amy Rodriguez; Heather O'Reilly; Aly Wagner; Carli Lloyd; Lauren Cheney; Tobin Heath; Stephanie Cox; Kate Markgraf; Angela Hucles; Lori Chalupny; Nicole Barnhart	Brazil; Andréia; Simone; Andréia Rosa; Tânia; Renata Costa; Maycon; Daniela; Formiga; Ester; Marta; Cristiane; Bárbara; Francielle; Pretinha; Fabiana; Érika; Maurine; Rosana	Germany; Nadine Angerer; Kerstin Stegemann; Saskia Bartusiak; Babett Peter; Annike Krahn; Linda Bresonik; Melanie Behringer; Sandra Smisek; Birgit Prinz; Renate Lingor; Anja Mittag; Ursula Holl; Célia Okoyino da Mbabi; Simone Laudehr; Fatmire Bajramaj; Conny Pohlers; Ariane Hingst; Kerstin Garefrekes
2012 London	United States; Hope Solo; Heather Mitts; Christie Rampone; Becky Sauerbrunn; Kelley O'Hara; Amy LePeilbet; Shannon Boxx; Amy Rodriguez; Heather O'Reilly; Carli Lloyd; Sydney Leroux; Lauren Cheney; Alex Morgan; Abby Wambach; Megan Rapinoe; Rachel Buehler; Tobin Heath; Nicole Barnhart	Japan; Miho Fukumoto; Yukari Kinga; Azusa Iwashimizu; Saki Kumagai; Aya Sameshima; Mizuho Sakaguchi; Kozue Ando; Aya Miyama; Nahomi Kawasumi; Homare Sawa; Shinobu Ohno; Kyoko Yano; Karina Maruyama; Asuna Tanaka; Megumi Takase; Mana Iwabuchi; Yūki Ōgimi; Ayumi Kaihori	Canada; Karina LeBlanc; Emily Zurrer; Chelsea Stewart; Carmelina Moscato; Robyn Gayle; Kaylyn Kyle; Rhian Wilkinson; Diana Matheson; Candace Chapman; Lauren Sesselmann; Desiree Scott; Christine Sinclair; Sophie Schmidt; Melissa Tancredi; Kelly Parker; Jonelle Filigno; Brittany Timko; Erin McLeod; Melanie Booth; Marie-Ève Nault
2016 Rio de Janeiro	Germany; Almuth Schult; Josephine Henning; Saskia Bartusiak; Leonie Maier; Annike Krahn; Simone Laudehr; Melanie Behringer; Lena Goeßling; Alexandra Popp; Dzsenifer Marozsán; Anja Mittag; Tabea Kemme; Sara Däbritz; Babett Peter; Mandy Islacker; Melanie Leupolz; Isabel Kerschowski; Laura Benkarth; Svenja Huth	Sweden; Jonna Andersson; Emilia Appelqvist; Kosovare Asllani; Emma Berglund; Stina Blackstenius; Hilda Carlén; Lisa Dahlkvist; Magdalena Eriksson; Nilla Fischer; Pauline Hammarlund; Sofia Jakobsson; Hedvig Lindahl; Fridolina Rolfö; Elin Rubensson; Jessica Samuelsson; Lotta Schelin; Caroline Seger; Linda Sembrant; Olivia Schough	Canada; Stephanie Labbé; Allysha Chapman; Kadeisha Buchanan; Shelina Zadorsky; Quinn (Note: Then known as Rebecca Quinn.); Deanne Rose; Rhian Wilkinson; Diana Matheson; Josée Bélanger; Ashley Lawrence; Desiree Scott; Christine Sinclair; Sophie Schmidt; Melissa Tancredi; Nichelle Prince; Janine Beckie; Jessie Fleming; Sabrina D'Angelo
2020 Tokyo	Canada; Stephanie Labbé; Allysha Chapman; Kadeisha Buchanan; Shelina Zadorsky; Quinn; Deanne Rose; Julia Grosso; Jayde Riviere; Adriana Leon; Ashley Lawrence; Desiree Scott; Christine Sinclair; Évelyne Viens; Vanessa Gilles; Nichelle Prince; Janine Beckie; Jessie Fleming; Kailen Sheridan; Jordyn Huitema; Sophie Schmidt; Gabrielle Carle; Erin McLeod	Sweden; Hedvig Lindahl; Jonna Andersson; Emma Kullberg; Hanna Glas; Hanna Bennison; Magdalena Eriksson; Madelen Janogy; Lina Hurtig; Kosovare Asllani; Sofia Jakobsson; Stina Blackstenius; Jennifer Falk; Amanda Ilestedt; Nathalie Björn; Olivia Schough; Filippa Angeldal; Caroline Seger; Fridolina Rolfö; Anna Anvegård; Julia Roddar; Rebecka Blomqvist; Zećira Mušović	United States; Alyssa Naeher; Crystal Dunn; Sam Mewis; Becky Sauerbrunn; Kelley O'Hara; Kristie Mewis; Tobin Heath; Julie Ertz; Lindsey Horan; Carli Lloyd; Christen Press; Tierna Davidson; Alex Morgan; Emily Sonnett; Megan Rapinoe; Rose Lavelle; Abby Dahlkemper; Adrianna Franch; Catarina Macario; Casey Krueger; Lynn Williams; Jane Campbell
2024 Paris	United States; Alyssa Naeher; Emily Fox; Korbin Albert; Naomi Girma; Trinity Rodman; Casey Krueger; Crystal Dunn; Lynn Williams; Mallory Swanson; Lindsey Horan; Sophia Smith; Tierna Davidson; Jenna Nighswonger; Emily Sonnett; Jaedyn Shaw; Rose Lavelle; Sam Coffey; Casey Murphy; Croix Bethune; Emily Sams	Brazil; Lorena; Antônia; Tarciane; Rafaelle Souza; Duda Sampaio; Tamires; Kerolin; Vitória Yaya; Adriana; Marta; Jheniffer; Tainá; Yasmim; Ludmila; Thaís; Gabi Nunes; Ana Vitória; Gabi Portilho; Priscila; Angelina; Lauren; Luciana	Germany; Merle Frohms; Sarai Linder; Kathrin Hendrich; Bibiane Schulze; Marina Hegering; Janina Minge; Lea Schüller; Sydney Lohmann; Sjoeke Nüsken; Laura Freigang; Alexandra Popp; Ann-Katrin Berger; Sara Doorsoun; Elisa Senß; Giulia Gwinn; Jule Brand; Klara Bühl; Vivien Endemann; Felicitas Rauch; Nicole Anyomi
2028 Los Angeles			
2032 Brisbane			

== Individual multiple gold medallists ==
=== Men ===
Two Golds

Javier Mascherano (ARG) (2004, 2008)
Dezső Novák (HUN) (1964, 1968)
José Leandro Andrade (URU) (1924, 1928)
Pedro Arispe (URU) (1924, 1928)
Pedro Cea (URU) (1924, 1928)
Andrés Mazali (URU) (1924, 1928)
José Nasazzi (URU) (1924, 1928)
Pedro Petrone (URU) (1924, 1928)
Héctor Scarone (URU) (1924, 1928)
Santos Urdinarán (URU) (1924, 1928)
Arthur Berry (GBR) (1908, 1912)
Vivian Woodward (GBR) (1908, 1912)

=== Women ===
Three Golds

Shannon Boxx (USA) (2004, 2008, 2012)
Christie Rampone (USA) (2004, 2008, 2012)
Heather Mitts (USA) (2004, 2008, 2012)
Heather O'Reilly (USA) (2004, 2008, 2012)

Two Golds

Nicole Barnhart (USA) (2008, 2012)
Rachel Buehler (USA) (2008, 2012)
Brandi Chastain (USA) (1996, 2004)
Lauren Cheney (USA) (2008, 2012)
Joy Fawcett (USA) (1996, 2004)
Julie Foudy (USA) (1996, 2004)
Angela Hucles (USA) (2004, 2008)
Mia Hamm (USA) (1996, 2004)
Tobin Heath (USA) (2008, 2012)
Kristine Lilly (USA) (1996, 2004)
Carli Lloyd (USA) (2008, 2012)
Kate Markgraf (USA) (2004, 2008)
Cindy Parlow (USA) (1996, 2004)
Amy Rodriguez (USA) (2008, 2012)
Briana Scurry (USA) (1996, 2004)
Hope Solo (USA) (2008, 2012)
Lindsay Tarpley (USA) (2004, 2008)
Aly Wagner (USA) (2004, 2008)
Abby Wambach (USA) (2004, 2012)
