= Football at the 1904 Summer Olympics – Men's team squads =

== (Canada) Galt F.C. ==
Head coach: Louis Duff (Canada)

No.	Pos.	Player	Date of birth (age)	Caps	Club
	GK	Ernest Linton	17 February 1880 (aged 24)	0	(Canada) Galt FC
	DF	John Gourlay (captain)	26 July 1872 (aged 32)	0	(Canada) Galt FC
	DF	George Ducker	27 September 1871 (aged 33)	0	(Canada) Galt FC
	MF	Bobby Lane	15 January 1882 (aged 22)	0	(Canada) Galt FC
	MF	Albert Johnston	17 April 1880 (aged 24)	0	(Canada) Galt FC
	MF	Jack Fraser	15 December 1881 (aged 22)	0	(Canada) Galt FC
	MF	Otto Christman	20 February 1880 (aged 24)	0	(Canada) Galt FC
	FW	William Twaits	20 August 1878 (aged 26)	0	(Canada) Galt FC
	FW	Tom Taylor	4 December 1880 (aged 23)	0	(Canada) Galt FC
	FW	Fred Steep	20 December 1874 (aged 29)	0	(Canada) Galt FC
	FW	Gordon McDonald	2 February 1878 (aged 26)	0	(Canada) Galt FC
	FW	Sandy Hall	3 December 1880 (aged 23)	0	(Canada) Galt FC
	FW	Red Henderson	29 August 1881 (aged 23)	0	(Canada) Galt FC
	FW	Parnell Gourlay	3 February 1879 (aged 25)	0	(Canada) Galt FC

== (United States) Christian Brothers College ==
Player coach: Joe Lydon (United States)

No.	Pos.	Player	Date of birth (age)	Caps	Club
	GK	Louis Menges	30 October 1888 (aged 16)	0	(United States) Collegians
	DF	Tom January	8 January 1886 (aged 18)	0	(United States) Collegians
	DF	Oscar Brockmeyer	13 November 1883 (aged 21)	0	(United States) Collegians
	MF	Peter Ratican	13 April 1887 (aged 17)	0	(United States) Collegians
	MF	John January	6 March 1882 (aged 22)	0	(United States) Collegians
	MF	Charles January	1 February 1888 (aged 16)	0	(United States) Collegians
	FW	Joe Lydon	2 February 1878 (aged 26)	0	(United States) Collegians
	FW	Ray Lawler	22 February 1888 (aged 16)	0	(United States) Collegians
	FW	Alexander Cudmore	10 February 1888 (aged 16)	0	(United States) Collegians
	FW	Warren Brittingham	2 September 1886 (aged 18)	0	(United States) Collegians
	FW	Charles Bartliff	18 August 1886 (aged 18)	0	(United States) Collegians

== (United States) St. Rose Parish ==
No.	Pos.	Player	Date of birth (age)	Caps	Club
	GK	Frank Frost		0	(United States) St. Rose
	DF	Henry Jameson	19 April 1883 (aged 21)	0	(United States) St. Rose
	DF	George Cooke	17 February 1883 (aged 21)	0	(United States) St. Rose
	MF	Edward Dierkes	14 March 1886 (aged 18)	0	(United States) St. Rose
	MF	Martin Dooling	18 December 1886 (aged 17)	0	(United States) St. Rose
	MF	Joseph Brady		0	(United States) St. Rose
	FW	Tom Cooke	22 August 1885 (aged 19)	0	(United States) St. Rose
	FW	Harry Tate	31 July 1886 (aged 18)	0	(United States) St. Rose
	FW	Leo O'Connell	31 August 1883 (aged 21)	0	(United States) St. Rose
	FW	Claude Jameson	20 January 1886 (aged 18)	0	(United States) St. Rose
	FW	Cormic Cosgrove	15 February 1869 (aged 35)	0	(United States) St. Rose
	FW	Johnson		0	(United States) St. Rose

== See also ==
- Football at the 1904 Summer Olympics
