= 1904–05 Christian Brothers Cadets men's soccer team =

American college soccer season

1904–05 Christian Brothers College men's soccer
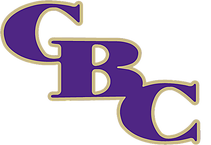

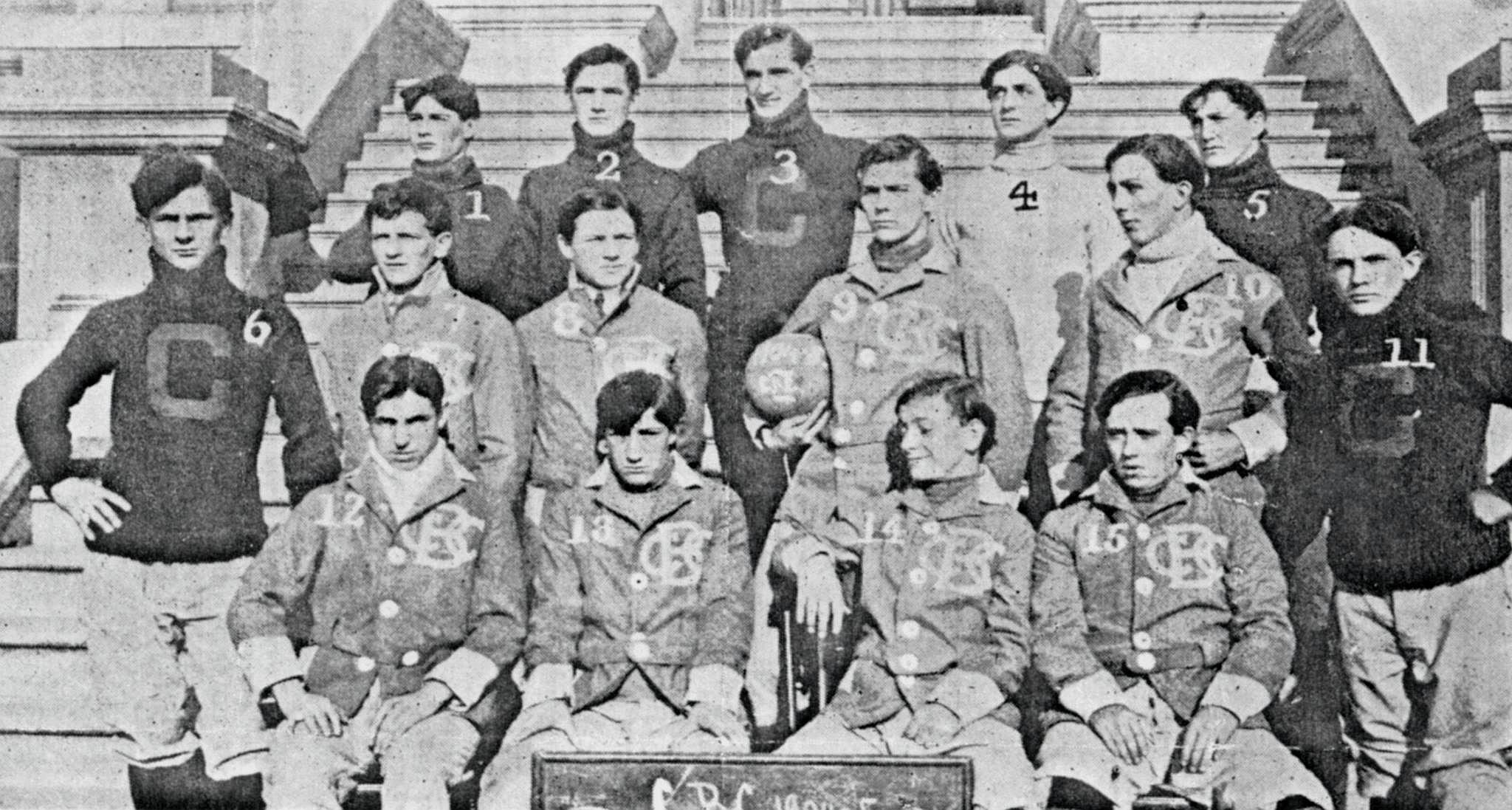

ISFL National co-champions

Olympic Games, Silver medal
- Conference: Independent
- Record: 1–1–2
- Head coach: Joseph Lydon (1st season)
- Home stadium: Cadet Park

The 1904–05 Christian Brothers College men's soccer team represented the Christian Brothers College High School during the 1904–05 college soccer season. The team, along with Haverford were declared co-champions by the Intercollegiate Soccer Football League. Additionally, the program was selected to participate as the local representative in the soccer tournament at the 1904 Summer Olympics in November. In the Olympics, the program earned the silver medal after losing to Canadian club, Galt, and defeating American club, St. Rose Parish. To date, they are the only college/high school soccer program to have ever earned an Olympic medal.

== Squad ==
The following players were known to have played for the university during the season.

Note: Flags indicate national team as defined under FIFA eligibility rules; some limited exceptions apply. Players may hold more than one non-FIFA nationality.

No.	Pos.	Nation	Player
—	FW	(United States) USA	Charles Bartliff
—	FW	(United States) USA	Warren Brittingham
—	DF	(United States) USA	Oscar Brockmeyer
—	FW	(United States) USA	Alexander Cudmore
—	MF	(United States) USA	Charles January
—	DF	(United States) USA	John January

No.	Pos.	Nation	Player
—	MF	(United States) USA	Thomas January
—	FW	(United States) USA	Raymond Lawler
—	MF	(Ireland) EIR	Joseph Lydon
—	GK	(United States) USA	Louis Menges
—	MF	(United States) USA	Peter Ratican

== Schedule ==
Date Time, TV	Rank^{#}	Opponent^{#}	Result	Record	Site City, State
Summer Olympics
11-16-1904*		vs. Galt	L 0–7	0–1–0	Francis Field; St. Louis, MO
11-20-1904*		vs. St. Rose Parish; Silver Medal match	T 0–0	0–1–1	Francis Field; St. Louis, MO
11-21-1904*		vs. St. Rose Parish; Silver Medal match, replay	T 0–0	0–1–2	Francis Field; St. Louis, MO
11-23-1904*		vs. St. Rose Parish; Silver Medal match, second replay	W 2–0	1–1–2	Francis Field; St. Louis, MO
*Non-conference game. ^{#}Rankings from United Soccer Coaches. (#) Tournament seedings in parentheses.
