= Western Football Association =

Governing body for soccer in Southern Ontario, Canada

- Founded: June 30, 1880; 146 years ago
- Folded: 1940; 86 years ago
- Headquarters: Berlin/Kitchener, Ontario
- FIFA affiliation: N/A
- President: List of presidents

The Western Football Association (WFA) was a governing body for soccer in Southern Ontario, Canada, and is often viewed as a precursor organization to the current Canadian Soccer Association. The organization was responsible for facilitating club play in Southern Ontario, and would also send teams to compete internationally, such as Galt F.C.'s participation at the 1904 Summer Olympics.

== History ==
Founded as the Western Football Association of Ontario, the association would grant membership to any amateur association rules football club west of Toronto. Immediately after its founding, the Western Football Association organized the WFA Challenge Cup, where member clubs would compete for the regional championship between 1880 and 1930. Following the dissolution of Toronto's Dominion Football Association in 1881, the WFA became the dominant soccer organization in Canada, and acted as Canada's national soccer association before the formation of the proper Dominion of Canada Football Association (Canada Soccer) in 1912. Because of this status, the WFA created the first ever Canadian national team to represent the country internationally in 1885, where they would go on to play against the United States in the first ever international match outside of the United Kingdom. (Note: Similar to Canada, this U.S. team was also organized prior to the creation of the United States Soccer Federation. Because neither team was affiliated with the current national soccer associations, this match is considered unofficial by FIFA for statistical purposes.) The WFA would also send their national team on tours in 1888 and 1891 to play friendly matches against various soccer clubs in England, Ireland, and Scotland. In 1904, the WFA was invited to send one of their member clubs to the 1904 Summer Olympics soccer tournament in St. Louis, where they chose to send eventual gold medalists Galt F.C. to compete with two other clubs from the United States. The Western Soccer Association eventually folded in 1940, and although the reason or reasons behind its dissolution are not entirely clear, it was likely a mix of financial issues, as well as its increased insignificance compared to the Dominion of Canada Football Association and Ontario Soccer Association.

== WFA Challenge Cup ==
List of champions:

- 1880: Berlin High School
- 1880–81: Berlin High School
- 1881–82: Berlin High School
- 1882–83: Berlin High School
- 1883–84: Dundas
- 1884–85: Berlin Rangers
- 1885–86: Galt F.C.
- 1886–87: Galt F.C.
- 1887–88: Berlin Rangers
- 1888 Fall: Berlin Rangers
- 1889 Spring: Berlin Rangers
- 1889 Fall: Toronto Varsity
- 1890 Spring: Toronto Scots
- 1890 Fall: Toronto Varsity
- 1891 Spring: Seaforth Hurons
- 1891 Fall: Detroit
- 1892 Spring: Michigan A.A.
- 1892 Fall: Preston
- 1893 Spring: Galt F.C.
- 1893 Fall: Windsor
- 1894 Spring: Seaforth Hurons
- 1894 Fall: Orwell
- 1895 Spring: Seaforth Hurons
- 1895 Fall: Berlin Mechanics
- 1896 Spring: Seaforth Hurons
- 1896 Fall: Ingersoll
- 1897 Spring: Berlin Rangers
- 1898: Berlin Rangers
- 1899: Berlin Rangers
- 1900: Berlin Rangers
- 1901: Galt F.C.
- 1902: Galt F.C.
- 1903: Galt F.C.
- 1904: Galt F.C.
- 1905: Seaforth Hurons
- 1906: Seaforth Hurons
- 1907: Dundas
- 1908: Preston
- 1909: Stratford
- 1910 Spring: Stratford
- 1910 Fall: Galt F.C.
- 1911: Woodstock
- 1912: Stratford
- 1913: Stratford
- 1914: Stratford
- 1915: Stratford
- 1916: No competition
- 1917: No competition
- 1918: No competition
- 1919: Brantford United
- 1920: Galt F.C.
- 1921: Guelph Taylor
- 1922: Forbes
- 1923: Guelph Taylor
- 1924: Forbes
- 1925: Kitchener Rangers
- 1926: Kitchener Rangers
- 1927: Owen Sound
- 1928: Hespeler Hummers
- 1929: Hespeler Hummers
- 1930: Newton
- 1931: Stratford
- 1932: Hespeler Hummers

== International competitions ==
Year(s)	Competition	Location	Team sent	score	Opponent(s)	Result
1885	Friendly	Newark, New Jersey	WFA team	1–0	United States (AFA)	—
1886	Friendly	Newark, New Jersey	WFA team	2–3	United States (AFA)	—
1888	Great Britain Tour	British Isles	WFA team	23 matches (details)		—
1891	Great Britain Tour	British Isles	WFA/AFA team	58 matches (details)		—
1892	Great Britain Tour	British Isles	WFA/AFA team	58 matches (details)		—
1904	Summer Olympics	St. Louis, Missouri	Galt F.C.	7–0	Christian Brothers College	Gold Medalists
1904	Summer Olympics	St. Louis, Missouri	Galt F.C.	4–0	Saint Rose Parish	Gold Medalists
1905	Friendly	Hamilton, Ontario	Hamilton/Dundas	2–8	Pilgrims (Note: The Pilgrims were a touring team of the following English players: J.D. Barnesdale (Notts Forest), T. Fletcher (Derby County), F.S. Walmsley (Blackburn Etrurians), J.E. Raine (Sheffield United), C.W. Storey (Leeds City), W.H. Nuttall (Blackburn Etrurians), J. Bryning (Northern Nomads), C. Coopland (Sheffield United), Sir Charles Kirkpatrick (Surrey), E.A. Milton (Sheffield Wycliffe), F.O. Wright (Notts Magdala), F.H. Milnes (Sheffield United).)	—
1905	Friendly	Niagara Falls, Ontario	Niagara Falls	0–5	Pilgrims	—
1905	Friendly	Berlin, Ontario	Berlin Rangers	2–1	Pilgrims	—
1905	"The Championship of the World"	Galt, Ontario	Galt F.C.	3–3	Pilgrims	—

== Notable staff ==
List of presidents
President	Year(s)
J.W. Connor	1880
J.E. Bryant	1881–85
C.F. McGillivray	1886
M.N. Todd	1887
J.A. Turner	1888
J.R.L. Starr	1889
George A. Dewar	1890–91
J.C. Breckenridge	1892
J.D. Lamont	1893
Henry J. Crawford	1984
William Prendergast	1895–96
W.M. Govenlock	1897
R.C. Cheswright	1898–1905
Louis B. Duff	1906–07
D.A. McLachlan	1908–09
Dr. Lederman	1910
Dr. Louis Doering	1911
Tom G. Elliott	1912
E.A. Rea	1913
J.M. McCutcheon	1914
David Forsyth	1915–19
H.W. Brown	1920–22
Don M. Campbell	1923–24
Beverley L.H. Bamford	1925–26
Fraser Campbell	1927–28
Harry Fisher	1929–30
Gladstone Neath	1931–33
Harold Western	1934–36
Harry Fisher Jr	1937–38
Frank Westerman	1939–40

List of secretary-treasurers
Secretary-treasurer	Year(s)
David Forsyth	1880–1905
H.W. Brown	1906
Solon Lutz	1907–1908
T.G. Elliott	1909–1910
H.W. Brown	1911–1912
N.R. Fiebig	1913–1915
Charles Hollins	1916–1918
C.C. Tatham	1919–1920
David Forsyth	1921–1923
Jim Blake	1924–1940

== Notable players ==
- Walter W. Bowman
- Christman
- Ducker
- David Forsyth
- John Fraser
- John Gourlay
- Parnell Gourlay
- Alexander Hall Hall
- Albert Henderson
- Albert Johnson
- Robert Lane
- Ernest Linton
- Gordon McDonald
- Frederick Steep
- Tom Taylor
- William Twaits
