= List of Canada–United States men's soccer matches =

This is a list of all matches played between the Canada and United States men's national soccer teams.

== Legend ==
Canada win	USA win	Draw	Neutral venue

== Official matches ==
Date	Competition	Home team	Away team	Score	Venue	Location	Series	Ref.
27 June 1925	International friendly	Canada	United States	1–0	Alexandra Park	Montreal, Canada	CAN 1–0–0	
8 November 1925	International friendly	United States	Canada	6–1	Ebbets Field	New York, United States	Tied 1–0–1	
6 November 1926	International friendly	United States	Canada	6–2	Ebbets Field	New York, United States	USA 2–0–1	
22 June 1957	1958 FIFA World Cup qualification (1st round)	Canada	United States	5–1	Varsity Stadium	Toronto, Canada	Tied 2–0–2	
6 July 1957	1958 FIFA World Cup qualification (1st round)	United States	Canada	2–3	Public School Grounds	St. Louis, United States	CAN 3–0–2	
17 October 1968	1970 FIFA World Cup qualification (1st round)	Canada	United States	4–2	Varsity Stadium	Toronto, Canada	CAN 4–0–2	
27 October 1968	1970 FIFA World Cup qualification (1st round)	United States	Canada	1–0	Atlanta–Fulton County Stadium	Atlanta, United States	CAN 4–0–3	
20 August 1972	1973 CONCACAF Championship qualification	Canada	United States	3–2	King George V Park	Saint John's, Canada	CAN 5–0–3	
29 August 1972	1973 CONCACAF Championship qualification	United States	Canada	2–2	Memorial Stadium	Baltimore, United States	CAN 5–1–3	
5 August 1973	International friendly	Canada	United States	0–2	Windsor Stadium	Windsor, Canada	CAN 5–1–4	
24 September 1976	1977 CONCACAF Championship qualification	Canada	United States	1–1	Empire Stadium	Vancouver, Canada	CAN 5–2–4	
20 October 1976	1977 CONCACAF Championship qualification	United States	Canada	2–0	Kingdome	Seattle, United States	Tied 5–2–5	
22 December 1976	1977 CONCACAF Championship qualification (play-off)	Canada (Note: Canada was listed as the home team for administrative purposes, but the match was played at a neutral venue in Haiti.)	United States	3–0	Stade Sylvio Cator	Port-au-Prince, Haiti	CAN 6–2–5	
25 October 1980	1981 CONCACAF Championship qualification	United States	Canada	0–0	Lockhart Stadium	Fort Lauderdale, United States	CAN 6–3–5	
1 November 1980	1981 CONCACAF Championship qualification	Canada	United States	2–1	Empire Stadium	Vancouver, Canada	CAN 7–3–5	
2 April 1985	International friendly	Canada	United States	2–0	BC Place	Vancouver, Canada	CAN 8–3–5	
4 April 1985	International friendly	United States	Canada	1–1	Civic Stadium	Portland, United States	CAN 8–4–5	
5 February 1986	Miami Cup (friendly)	United States	Canada	0–0	Orange Bowl	Miami, United States	CAN 8–5–5	
16 March 1991	North American Nations Cup	United States	Canada	2–0	Murdock Stadium	Torrance, United States	CAN 8–5–6	
3 September 1992	International friendly	Canada	United States	0–2	Jeux Canada Games Stadium	Saint John, Canada	CAN 8–5–7	
9 October 1992	International friendly	United States	Canada	0–0	?	Greensboro, United States	CAN 8–6–7	
3 March 1993	International friendly	United States	Canada	2–2	?	Costa Mesa, United States	CAN 8–7–7	
16 March 1997	1998 FIFA World Cup qualification (4th round)	United States	Canada	3–0	Stanford Stadium	Stanford, United States	Tied 8–7–8	
9 November 1997	1998 FIFA World Cup qualification (4th round)	Canada	United States	0–3	Swangard Stadium	Burnaby, Canada	USA 9–7–8	
30 January 2002	CONCACAF Gold Cup (semi-final)	United States (Note: Canada was listed as the home team for administrative purposes, but the match was played in the United States.)	Canada	0–0 (4–2 p.)	Rose Bowl	Pasadena, United States	USA 9–8–8	
18 January 2003	International friendly	United States	Canada	4–0	Lockhart Stadium	Fort Lauderdale, United States	USA 10–8–8	
July 9 2005	CONCACAF Gold Cup (group stage)	United States	Canada	2–0	Quest Field	Seattle, United States	USA 11–8–8	
22 January 2006	International friendly	United States	Canada	0–0	Torero Stadium	San Diego, United States	USA 11–9–8	
21 June 2007	CONCACAF Gold Cup (semi-final)	United States	Canada	2–1	Soldier Field	Chicago, United States	USA 12–9–8	
7 June 2011	CONCACAF Gold Cup (group stage)	United States	Canada	2–0	Ford Field	Detroit, United States	USA 13–9–8	
3 June 2012	International friendly	Canada	United States	0–0	BMO Field	Toronto, Canada	USA 13–10–8	
29 January 2013	International friendly	United States	Canada	0–0	BBVA Compass Stadium	Houston, United States	USA 13–11–8	
5 February 2016	International friendly	United States	Canada	1–0	StubHub Center	Carson, United States	USA 14–11–8	
15 October 2019	CONCACAF Nations League	Canada	United States	2–0	BMO Field	Toronto, Canada	USA 14–11–9	
15 November 2019	CONCACAF Nations League	United States	Canada	4–1	Exploria Stadium	Orlando, United States	USA 15–11–9	
18 July 2021	CONCACAF Gold Cup (group stage)	United States	Canada	1–0	Children's Mercy Park	Kansas City, United States	USA 16–11–9	
5 September 2021	2022 FIFA World Cup qualification (3rd round)	United States	Canada	1–1	Nissan Stadium	Nashville, United States	USA 16–12–9	
30 January 2022	2022 FIFA World Cup qualification (3rd round)	Canada	United States	2–0	Tim Hortons Field	Hamilton, Canada	USA 16–12–10	
18 June 2023	CONCACAF Nations League Finals (final)	United States	Canada	2–0	Allegiant Stadium	Paradise, United States	USA 17–12–10	
9 July 2023	CONCACAF Gold Cup (quarter-finals)	United States	Canada	2–2 (3–2 p.)	TQL Stadium	Cincinnati, United States	USA 17–13–10	
7 September 2024	International friendly	United States	Canada	1–2	Children's Mercy Park	Kansas City, United States	USA 17–13–11	
23 March 2025	CONCACAF Nations League Finals (3rd place play-off)	United States	Canada	2–1	SoFi Stadium	Inglewood, United States	USA 17–13–12	
6 October 2026	International friendly	United States	Canada	1–0	Allianz Field	Saint Paul, United States	USA 18–13–12	

== Unofficial matches ==
Date	Competition	Home team	Away team	Score	Venue	Location	Series
28 November 1885	International friendly (Note: This match is not considered to be official by FIFA, as the national teams were not organized by the CSA and the USSF.)	United States (AFA)	Canada (WFA)	0–1	?	Newark, United States	CAN 1–0–0
25 November 1886	International friendly	United States (AFA)	Canada (WFA)	3–2	?	Newark, United States	Tied 1–0–1
16 November 1904	Summer Olympics (Note: The 1904 Summer Olympics are considered by FIFA to be unofficial, as it was not contested by national teams.)	Christian Brothers College	Galt F.C.	0–7	World's Fair Stadium	St. Louis, United States	CAN 2–0–1
17 November 1904	Summer Olympics	St. Rose Parish	Galt F.C.	0–4	World's Fair Stadium	St. Louis, United States	CAN 3–0–1

== Disputed-status matches ==
Date	Competition	Home team	Away team	Score	Venue	Location	Series
6 May 1990	North American Nations Cup (Note: This match is not considered an official match by the United States, as they did not send their first team to the tournament.)	Canada	United States B	1–0	Swangard Stadium	Burnaby, Canada	CAN 1–0–0

== Summary ==
As of October 6, 2026

National team all-time results
Competition	Matches	Wins		Draws
Competition	Matches	CAN	USA	Draws
CONCACAF Championship qualification	7	3	1	3
CONCACAF Gold Cup	6	0	4	2
CONCACAF Nations League	4	2	2	0
FIFA World Cup qualification (Note: This row only includes results from World Cup qualifying competitions that were separate from the CONCACAF Championship.)	8	4	3	1
North American Nations Cup	1	0	1	0
Competitive total	26	9	11	6
International friendlies	17	3	7	7
Official total	43	12	18	13
Unofficial matches	4	3	1	0
Disputed matches	1	1	0	0
All-time total	48	16	19	13

== See also ==
- Canada men's national soccer team results
- United States men's national soccer team results
- Canada–United States junior ice hockey rivalry
- Canada–United States women's national ice hockey rivalry
- History of rugby union matches between Canada and the United States
