= John Gourlay (soccer) =

Canadian soccer player (1872–1949)

Olympic medal record

Men's soccer

Representing Canada
Gold medal – first place	1904 St. Louis	Team competition

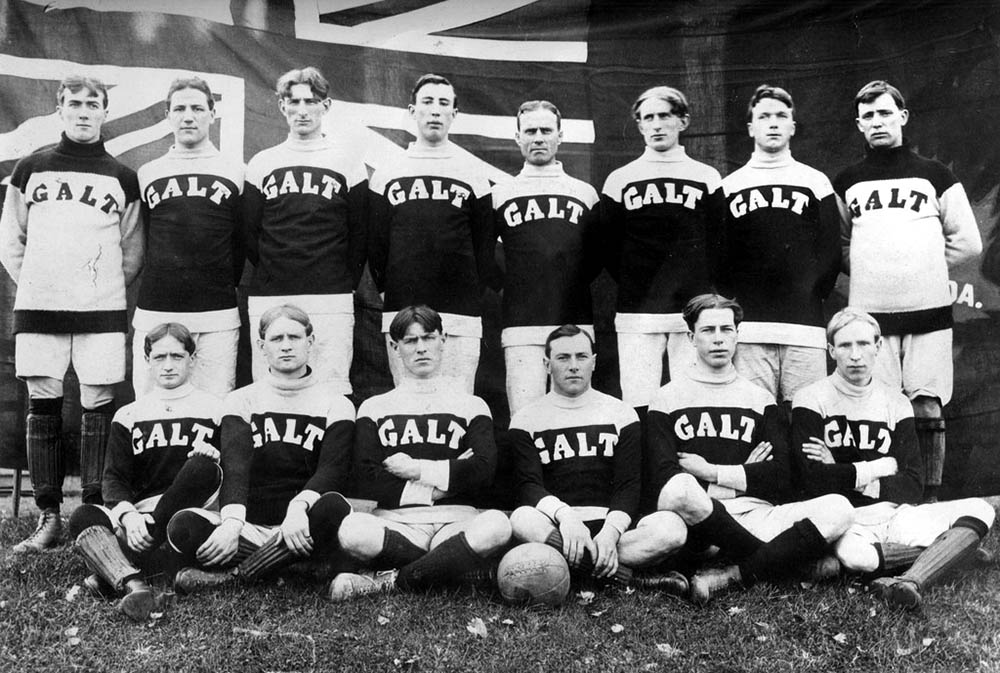
Canadian team Galt F.C., winner of the gold medal at the 1904 summer olympics. Back row, from left to right: Fraser, Lane, Johnson, P. Gourlay, Ducker, Linton, Christman and J. Gourlay. Front row, from left to right: Taylor, Steep, Hall, McDonald, Twaits and Henderson.

John Bell Gourlay (July 26, 1872 – April 7, 1949) was a Canadian amateur soccer player who competed in the 1904 Summer Olympics. He was born in Essex, Ontario and died in West Vancouver. In 1904 he was captain of the Galt F.C. team, which won the gold medal in football at the 1904 Summer Olympics. He played all two matches as a full-back. These Olympic Games were the first in which gold medals were given for football, making Gourlay and the Galt football team one of the first Canadians to win gold medals at the Olympics. Gold medals were presented to the team members immediately after the game. The winning medals were inscribed “1904 Universal Exposition Olympic Games St. Louis Association Football Championship”. This was the only Canadian football team to win Olympic gold until the Canadian women’s team at the 2020 Olympic Summer Games.

== Life ==
Gourlay was born on July 26, 1872 in Essex, Ontario. His brother, Parnell Orde Gourlay, also played for the gold medal winning Galt football team.

Gourlay played in the Western Football Association from 1889 and then the Ontario Football Association League, after it was founded in 1901. He first played for the Toronto Marlboros before joining Galt. With Galt, he won the Ontario Cup from 1901-1903, and the WFA Challenge Cup from 1901-1904. In 1903, he participated in the Manitoba Tour, in which Galt won all 17 matches. In 1905, Galt won the unofficial Dominion Championship beating a team from Westmount, Quebec in two matches. Also in 1905, he played in an international match, billed as being for The Championship of the World, against an English amateur team. The game resulted in a 3-3 draw. Gourlay played in games in the United States in Detroit, St. Louis, Buffalo, Chicago, Fall River and Newark.

At the 1904 Summer Olympics, Galt faced two American teams in a round-robin tournament. In the first game, on November 16, Galt defeated Christian Brothers College 7–0. In the second game, against St. Rose Parish on November 16, after a scoreless first half, Gourlay, as captain, inspired the Galt team with a half-time talk, and Galt went on to win 4–0.

Gourlay moved to Vancouver where he played for Vancouver City in 1906. Gourlay worked as a machinist. He married Ada Blanche Lovelace.

He died in West Vancouver on April 7, 1949 at the age of 77.

== In popular culture ==
In "Bend It Like Brackenreid" (November 14, 2016), episode 6 of season 10 of the Canadian television period detective series Murdoch Mysteries, Gourlay is shown leading the Galt football team in a victory over the University of Toronto Varsity Blues football team to qualify for the 1904 Summer Olympics. Gourlay is played by Benjamin Sutherland.
