= Herb Donaldson (American football) =

American football player (born 1985)

No. 36
- Position: Running back

Personal information
- Born: December 13, 1985 (age 40); St. Louis, Missouri, U.S.
- Listed height: 5 ft 11 in (1.80 m)
- Listed weight: 225 lb (102 kg)

Career information
- High school: Christian Brothers College (MO)
- College: Western Illinois
- NFL draft: 2009: undrafted

Career history
- New Orleans Saints (2009)*; Dallas Cowboys (2009-2010)*; Tennessee Titans (2010–2012)*
- * Offseason or practice squad member only

Awards and highlights
- Second-team All-Gateway (2006); Second-team All-region (2006); 2× All-MVFC (2007, 2008); AFCA All-American Team (2008); MVFC Offensive Player of the Year (2008)
- Stats at Pro Football Reference

Herb Donaldson (born December 13, 1985) is an American former professional football player who was a running back in the National Football League (NFL) for the New Orleans Saints, Dallas Cowboys and Tennessee Titans. He was signed as an undrafted free agent by the New Orleans Saints in 2009. He played college football at Western Illinois.

== Early life ==
Donaldson attended Christian Brothers College High School. As a senior, he registered 1,356 rushing yards, 20 touchdowns and 39 tackles. He had 241 rushing yards and 4 touchdowns against St. Louis University High School. He was named conference co-player of the year and received All-Metro honors as a linebacker.

He accepted a football scholarship from Western Illinois University. As a redshirt freshman, he appeared in all 11 games, playing mostly on special teams, His only carries came in two games against Iowa Wesleyan University and Indiana State University, when he totaled 54 rushing yards (4.5-yard avg.) and one touchdown. He also returned five kickoffs for 71 yards.

As a sophomore, he was named the starter at running back, posting 1,417 yards (school sophomore record) and 18 rushing touchdowns (third in school history). He was the nation’s ninth-leading rusher on the season (128.82-yard avg.). He set a school and league-record 328 yards and 6 touchdowns in a 46-41 win against Indiana State University. He also rushed for a FCS record of 282 yards in a half in the same game. He reached 1,000 yards on 176 carries, faster than all but two players in school history.

As a junior, he registered 1,491 rushing yards in 10 games. He missed the season finale with a sprained ankle injury. He reached 1,000 yards in his seventh game, tying the school record. He became just the second player in school history to post back-to-back 1,400-yard rushing seasons. He led the Gateway Conference and ranked fifth in the Nation with an average of 149.10 rushing yards per game. He had 314 rushing yards against Missouri State University, the second-highest total in the nation. He became only the fifth player in FCS history to rush for 300 yards twice in a career. He had two 200-yard games, seven 100-yard games, four 100-yard halves and two 100-yard quarters. He contributed to the nation’s 11th-best rushing offense and the highest team rushing average since 1958.

As a senior, he led all of the NCAA Division I in both rushing (162.2 ypg.) and scoring (12.0 ppg.). His 1,784 rushing yards and 21 rushing touchdowns ranked fifth in the league's history. He became the All-time leading rusher in both school and Missouri Valley Football Conference history. He set the conference record of 23 100-yard games and was the first player in conference history to reach 1,000 yards in his seventh game twice in a career. He had nine 100-yard games and four 200-yard games. He posted four of the season's top 22 rushing games. He finished third in the Walter Payton Award voting.

He finished his college career with 828 carries for 4,746 yards (5.7-yard avg.), 50 rushing touchdowns, 36 receptions for 225 yards and one receiving touchdown. He had three seasons of 1,400-plus yards and reached double-digits in touchdowns each time.

== Professional career ==
=== New Orleans Saints ===
Donaldson was signed as an undrafted free agent by the New Orleans Saints after the 2009 NFL draft on May 5. He was waived on September 5. He was signed to the practice squad on October 29. The Saints released him from their practice squad on November 20.

=== Dallas Cowboys ===
On December 21, 2009, he was signed to the Dallas Cowboys' practice squad. He was brought back for the 2010 season and waived during final cuts on September 4.

=== Tennessee Titans ===
On September 7, 2010, Donaldson was signed to the Tennessee Titans practice squad. On September 2, 2011, he was released and signed to the practice squad September 4. He was released on August 26, 2012.
