= Thomas Cooke (soccer) =

American soccer player

Olympic medal record

Men's Soccer
Bronze medal – third place	1904 St. Louis	Team competition

Thomas Joseph Cooke (August 22, 1886 – July 15, 1964) was an American amateur soccer player who competed in the 1904 Summer Olympics. He was born in St. Louis, Missouri and died in Denver, Colorado.

In 1904 he was a member of the St. Rose Parish team, which won the bronze medal in the soccer tournament. He played one match as a forward. He broke his leg during the first game with Galt F.C. and was replaced with Johnson in a later three games. His older brother George was also member of a bronze medal team.He married Elsa Marie Beamer in 1906 in St Louis, MO. They had eight children in 15 years. Shelly W. b: 1910; Melville Herbert b: 1913; Ellsworth Allen b: 1915; Elvira Marie b: 1916; Virgil Kenneth b: 1917; .Gladys Gertrude b: 1919; Doris Irene b: 1924 and Audrey L. b: 1925. Cooke died in 1964 in Denver, Colorado, at the age of 78
