= Paul McSweeney =

American baseball player (1867–1951)

- Second baseman
- Born: April 3, 1867; St. Louis, Missouri, U.S.
- Died: August 12, 1951 (aged 84); St. Louis, Missouri, U.S.
- Batted: Unknown Threw: Unknown

MLB debut
- September 20, 1891, for the St. Louis Browns

Last MLB appearance
- September 22, 1891, for the St. Louis Browns

MLB statistics
- Batting average: .250
- Home runs: 0
- Runs batted in: 2
- Stats at Baseball Reference

Teams
- St. Louis Browns (1891)

Paul Alphonsus McSweeney (April 3, 1867 – August 12, 1951) was an American professional baseball player who played second base in the Major Leagues for the 1891 St. Louis Browns.

McSweeney also worked as a soccer referee at the 1904 Summer Olympics in St. Louis.

McSweeney died in his home town of St. Louis, Missouri in 1951 of colorectal cancer.
