= Parnell Gourlay =

Canadian soccer player

Olympic medal record

Men's Soccer

Representing Canada
Gold medal – first place	1904 St. Louis	Team competition

Parnell Orde Gourlay (February 3, 1879 – November 15, 1958) was a Canadian amateur soccer player who competed in the 1904 Summer Olympics. He was born in Galt, Ontario and died in Vancouver, British Columbia at age 79. In 1904 he was part of the Galt F.C. team which won the gold medal in football at the 1904 Summer Olympics. He was the only member of the team who did not see any action. These Olympic Games were the first in which gold medals were given for football, making Gourlay and the Galt football team one of the first Canadians to win gold medals at the Olympics. Gold medals were presented to the team members immediately after the game.

== Life ==
Gourlay was born on February 3, 1879 in Galt, Ontario. His brother, John Bell Gourlay, also played for the gold medal winning Galt football team as its captain and full-back.

Gourlay died in Vancouver on November 15, 1958 at the age of 79.
