= Tom Taylor (soccer, born 1880) =

Canadian soccer player (1880–1945)

Olympic medal record

Men's Soccer

Representing Canada
Gold medal – first place	1904 St. Louis	Team competition

Thomas Sylvester Taylor (4 December 1880 – 15 August 1945) was a Canadian amateur soccer player who competed in the 1904 Summer Olympics as a member of a Canadian team made-up of Galt F.C. players. In St. Louis he was the soccer tournament's joint top scorer with three goals as his side won the gold medal.

== Biography ==
He was born in Ontario. In 1904 he was part of Canada's gold medal-winning 1904 Olympic team, in which he played in all two matches as a forward and scored three goals against U.S.'s Christian Brothers College (1) and St. Rose Parish (2), finishing the tournament as the joint-top scorer alongside teammate Alexander Hall, thus contributing decisively in his side's triumph. After the 1904 Games, Tom moved to Winnipeg and became Assistant Manager of the A.R. Williams Machine Company to at least 1936.

He should not be confused with Thomas G. Taylor who was a coach of the U.S. Naval Academy's soccer team.

== Career statistics ==
List of international goals scored by Tom Taylor
No.	Date	Venue	Opponent	Score	Result	Competition
1.	November 16, 1904	World's Fair Stadium, St. Louis, United States	(United States) Christian Brothers College	?–0	7–0	1904 Summer Olympics
2.	November 17, 1904	World's Fair Stadium, St. Louis, United States	(United States) St. Rose Parish	1–0	4–0	1904 Summer Olympics
3.	November 17, 1904	World's Fair Stadium, St. Louis, United States	(United States) St. Rose Parish	?–0	4–0	1904 Summer Olympics

== Honours ==
=== International ===
Canada Olympic

- Summer Olympic Games: 1904

=== Individual ===
- Summer Olympic Games top-scorer: 1904 (3 goals)
