= George Edwin Cooke =

American soccer player

Olympic medal record

Men's Soccer
| Bronze medal – third place | 1904 St. Louis | Team competition |

George Edwin Cooke (February 17, 1883 – June 3, 1969) was an American amateur soccer player who competed in the 1904 Summer Olympics. He was born and died in St. Louis, Missouri.

In 1904 he was a member of the St. Rose Parish team, which won the bronze medal in the soccer tournament. He played all three matches as a fullback. His younger brother Thomas was also member of the bronze medal team, but he broke his leg during the first game with Galt F.C. and was replaced with Johnson in the later games.

Outside of soccer, Cooke worked for the Liggett Group for over 50 years. Cooke married Anna Sullivan, with whom he had nine children who survived him. His funeral was held at Our Lady of Perpetual Help Church in St. Louis, and he was interred in that city's Calvary Cemetery.
