= Harry Tate (soccer) =

American soccer player

Olympic medal record

Men's Soccer
Bronze medal – third place	1904 St. Louis	Team competition

Harry F. Tate (July 31, 1886 – October 27, 1954) was an American amateur soccer player who competed in the 1904 Summer Olympics. He was born and died in St. Louis, Missouri. In 1904 he was a member of the St. Rose Parish team, which won the bronze medal in the soccer tournament. He played all four matches as a forward.
