= Martin Dooling =

American soccer player

Olympic medal record

Men's Soccer
Bronze medal – third place	1904 St. Louis	Team competition

Martin T. Dooling (December 18, 1886, Alton, Illinois – August 21, 1966, Saint Louis, Missouri) was an American amateur soccer player who competed in the 1904 Summer Olympics. In 1904 he was a member of the St. Rose Parish team, which won the bronze medal in the soccer tournament. He played all four matches as a midfielder.
