= Leo O'Connell =

American soccer player

Olympic medal record

Men's Soccer

Representing United States
Bronze medal – third place	1904 St. Louis	Team competition

Leo Anthony O'Connell (August 31, 1883 – August 15, 1934) was an American amateur soccer player who competed in the 1904 Summer Olympics. In 1904 he was a member of the St. Rose Parish team, which won the bronze medal in the soccer tournament. He played in three of the four matches.
