= Frank Frost (soccer) =

Personal information
- Position: Goalkeeper

Senior career*
Years	Team	Apps	(Gls)
1904	St. Rose Parish		
- * Club domestic league appearances and goals

Olympic medal record

Men's Soccer

Representing United States
Bronze medal – third place	1904 St. Louis	Team competition

Frank Frost was an American amateur soccer player who competed in the 1904 Summer Olympics. In 1904 he was a member of the St. Rose Parish team, which won the bronze medal in the soccer tournament.
