= Henry Jameson =

American soccer player

Olympic medal record

Men's Soccer
Bronze medal – third place	1904 St. Louis	Team competition

Henry Wood Jameson (April 19, 1883 – March 7, 1938) was an American amateur soccer player who competed in the 1904 Summer Olympics. He was born in St. Louis, Missouri and died in Pittsburgh, Pennsylvania. In 1904 he was a member of the St. Rose Parish team, which won the bronze medal in the soccer tournament. He played all four matches as a defender.
