= Gordon McDonald =

Canadian soccer player

Personal information
- Date of birth: 2 February 1878
- Place of birth: Walton, Ontario, Canada
- Date of death: May 23, 1938 (aged 60)
- Place of death: Haileybury, Ontario, Canada

Senior career*
Years	Team	Apps	(Gls)
	Galt F.C.	?	(?)

International career
1904	Canada Olympic	1	(1)
Medal record
Men's football
Representing Canada
Olympic Games
Gold medal – first place	1904 St. Louis
- * Club domestic league appearances and goals

Gordon McDonald (2 February 1878 – 23 May 1938) was a Canadian amateur soccer player who competed in the 1904 Summer Olympics. In 1904, he was a member of the Galt F.C. team, which won the gold medal in the soccer tournament, scoring one goal in a 7–0 win over the United States, represented by Christian Brothers College.
