= Frederick Steep =

Canadian soccer player

Olympic medal record

Men's soccer

Representing Canada
Gold medal – first place	1904 St. Louis	Team competition

Frederick William Steep (20 December 1874 – 14 September 1956) was a Canadian amateur soccer player who competed in the 1904 Summer Olympics. Steep was born in St. Catharines, Ontario. In 1904 he was a member of the Galt F.C. team, which won the gold medal in the soccer tournament. He played all two matches as a forward and scored one goal in a 7-0 win over the United States, represented by Christian Brothers College.
