= Joseph Brady (soccer) =

American soccer player

Olympic medal record

Men's Soccer

Representing United States
Bronze medal – third place	1904 St. Louis	Team competition

Joseph J. Brady was an American amateur soccer player who competed in the 1904 Summer Olympics. He was a member of the St. Rose Parish team, which won the bronze medal in the soccer tournament. He played in three of the four matches.
