= Bok de Korver =

Dutch footballer

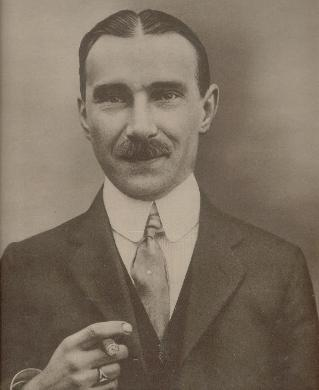

Senior career*
Years	Team	Apps	(Gls)
1902–1923	Sparta Rotterdam		

International career
1905–1913	Netherlands	31	(2)
Medal record
Men's Football
Olympic Games
Bronze medal – third place	1908 London	Team competition
Bronze medal – third place	1912 Stockholm	Team competition
- * Club domestic league appearances and goals

Johannes Marius ("Bok") de Korver (27 January 1883 in Rotterdam – 22 October 1957 in Rotterdam) was a football player from the Netherlands, who twice won a bronze medal with the Netherlands national football team at the Summer Olympics: in 1908 (London) and in 1912 (Stockholm).

== Career ==
De Korver played for Sparta Rotterdam between 1902 and 1923. He won the Dutch national title five times. De Korver scored his most notable goal in 1912, in a match against AFC Ajax. His goal won Sparta the national title.

De Korver played 31 caps for the Netherlands between 1905 and 1913, scoring two goals. He won two Olympic bronze medals in 1908 and 1912. De Korver captained the latter team. He was also a player of the Dutch national team that beat England for the first time ever, in 1913.

Bok de Korver was a civil servant for the municipality of Rotterdam. He ended his career at age 40 after pneumonia. De Korver died on 22 October 1957, aged 74. He was buried in Haren (Groningen).

De Korver was an honorary member of Sparta and of the Royal Dutch Football Association. The football club BDK from Amsterdam was named after De Korver. The west stand of Sparta's stadium, Het Kasteel, was renamed Bok de Korver Stand on 1 April 2007.

== Career statistics ==
=== International ===
Netherlands national team
Year	Apps	Goals
1905	2	1
1906	2	0
1907	1	0
1908	6	1
1909	3	0
1910	4	0
1911	3	0
1912	6	0
1913	4	0
Total	31	2

==== International goals ====
Scores and results table. Netherlands's goal tally first:

#	Date	Venue	Opponent	Score	Result	Competition
1.	14 May 1905	Rotterdam, Netherlands	Belgium	1–0	4-0	Friendly
2.	29 March 1908	Antwerp, Belgium	Belgium		4–1	Friendly
