= Cormic Cosgrove =

American soccer player

Olympic medal record

Men's Soccer
Bronze medal – third place	1904 St. Louis	Team competition

Cormic F. Cosgrove (February 15, 1869 – July 6, 1930) was an American amateur soccer player who competed in the 1904 Summer Olympics. He died in St. Louis, Missouri. In 1904 he was a member of the St. Rose Parish team, which won the bronze medal in the soccer tournament. He played all four matches.
