= Canada–United States junior ice hockey rivalry =

International ice hockey rivalry

- Location: North America
- Teams: Canada; United States
- First meeting: December 1973; CAN 5–4 USA; World Junior Championships, Round-robin (Leningrad, Soviet Union)
- Latest meeting: December 31, 2024; USA 4–1 CAN; World Junior Championships, Preliminary (Ottawa, Ontario, Canada)

Statistics
- Total meetings: 58
- Most wins: Canada (38)
- All-time series: 38–17–3
- Largest victory: December 1974; CAN 9–3 USA; World Junior Championships, Round-robin (Brandon, Canada); January 1, 1977; CAN 8–2 USA; World Junior Championships, Round-robin (Zvolen, Czechoslovakia)
- Longest win streak: Canada (9)
- Current win streak: USA (1)

A highly competitive sports rivalry that exists between the national under-20 ice hockey teams of the two countries, as well as their respective sets of fans. The two countries are perennial rivals at the World Junior Championships for players under 20 years of age. Overall, Canada holds a total of 20 gold medals, while the United States holds seven gold medals.

On December 29, 2017, the two teams played each other outdoors at New Era Field in Orchard Park, New York, during the 2018 World Junior Championships. The U.S. won the game 4–3 over Canada in a game-winning shootout. This was the first outdoor game held at any top-level IIHF World Championship.

== List of matches ==
=== Statistics ===
Last match update: December 31, 2024

Competition	Matches	Wins		Ties	Goal difference	
Competition	Matches	CAN	USA	Ties	CAN	USA
World Junior Championships (official, since 1977)	50	34	13	3	194	144
World Junior Championships (unofficial, 1974–1976)	2	2	0	0	14	7
Other	6	2	4	0	24	28
Total	58	38	17	3	232	179

=== Matches ===
Legend

- – Canada win
- – Canada OT win
- – Tie
- – U.S. win
- – U.S. OT win

Date	Tournament	Type	Winning team (Note: Italic indicates a draw. Bold indicates a team that won the tournament's gold medal.)	Scores (by period)	Losing team	Host venue
December 1973	1974 World Junior Championships	Round-robin	Canada	5–4 (1–1, 1–2, 3–1)	United States	(Soviet Union) Leningrad
December 1974	1975 World Junior Championships	Round-robin	Canada	9–3 (1–2, 4–1, 4–0)	United States	(Canada) Brandon, Manitoba
January 1, 1977	1977 World Junior Championships	Round-robin	Canada	8–2 (3–2, 2–0, 3–0)	United States	(Czechoslovakia) Zvolen
December 22, 1977	1978 World Junior Championships	Preliminary round	Canada	6–3 (2–1, 1–2, 3–0)	United States	(Canada) Montreal Forum, Montreal, Quebec
January 2, 1979	1979 World Junior Championships	Consolation round	Canada	6–3 (1–0, 4–3, 1–0)	United States	(Sweden) Karlstad
January 1, 1980	1980 World Junior Championships	Consolation round	Canada	4–2 (0–0, 3–2, 1–0)	United States	(Finland) Helsinki
December 31, 1980	1981 World Junior Championships	Consolation round	United States	7–3 (2–1, 2–2, 3–0)	Canada	(West Germany) Landsberg
December 27, 1981	1982 World Junior Championships	Round-robin	**Canada**	5–4 (0–2, 4–1, 1–1)	United States	(United States) Metropolitan Sports Center, Bloomington, Minnesota
December 27, 1982	1983 World Junior Championships	Round-robin	Canada	4–2 (2–2, 1–0, 1–0)	United States	(Soviet Union) Leningrad
December 26, 1983	1984 World Junior Championships	Round-robin	Canada	5–2 (3–0, 2–2, 0–0)	United States	(Sweden) Nyköping
December 28, 1984	1985 World Junior Championships	Round-robin	**Canada**	7–5 (3–2, 0–2, 4–1)	United States	(Finland) Turku
December 29, 1985	1986 World Junior Championships	Round-robin	Canada	5–2 (1–1, 2–1, 2–0)	United States	(Canada) Copps Coliseum, Hamilton, Ontario
January 1, 1987	1987 World Junior Championships	Round-robin	Canada	6–2 (3–1, 1–1, 2–0)	United States	(Czechoslovakia) Piestany
December 31, 1987	1988 World Junior Championships	Round-robin	**Canada**	5–4 (2–2, 3–0, 0–2)	United States	(Soviet Union) Moscow
December 29, 1988	1989 World Junior Championships	Round-robin	Canada	5–1 (2–0, 2–0, 1–1)	United States	(United States) Sullivan Arena, Anchorage, Alaska
December 26, 1989	1990 World Junior Championships	Round-robin	**Canada**	3–2 (0–0, 1–1, 2–1)	United States	(Finland) Turku
December 27, 1990	1991 World Junior Championships	Round-robin	**Canada**	4–4 (1–3, 1–0, 2–1)	United States	(Canada) Saskatchewan Place, Saskatoon, Saskatchewan
January 1, 1992	1992 World Junior Championships	Round-robin	United States	5–3 (1–2, 1–0, 3–1)	Canada	(Germany) Füssen
December 26, 1992	1993 World Junior Championships	Round-robin	**Canada**	3–0 (1–0, 2–0, 0–0)	United States	(Sweden) Gävle
January 1, 1994	1994 World Junior Championships	Round-robin	**Canada**	8–3 (4–2, 2–0, 2–1)	United States	(Czech Republic) Frydek-Mistek
December 29, 1994	1995 World Junior Championships	Round-robin	**Canada**	8–3 (4–0, 3–1, 1–2)	United States	(Canada) ENMAX Centrium, Red Deer, Alberta
December 26, 1995	1996 World Junior Championships	Preliminary round	**Canada**	6–1 (3–0, 2–0, 1–1)	United States	(United States) Centrum in Worcester, Worcester, Massachusetts
December 28, 1996	1997 World Junior Championships	Preliminary round	**Canada**	4–4 (2–2, 1–0, 1–2)	United States	(Switzerland) Geneva
January 4, 1997	1997 World Junior Championships	Final	**Canada**	2–0 (0–0, 1–0, 1–0)	United States	(Switzerland) Geneva
January 2, 1998	1998 World Junior Championships	5th–8th placement games	United States	3–0 (1–0, 1–0, 1–0)	Canada	(Finland) Hameenlinna Ice Arena, Hämeenlinna
December 31, 1998	1999 World Junior Championships	Preliminary round	United States	5–2 (1–0, 3–2, 1–0)	Canada	(Canada) Winnipeg Arena, Winnipeg, Manitoba
December 31, 1999	2000 World Junior Championships	Preliminary round	Canada	1–1 (0–0, 1–0, 0–1)	United States	(Sweden) Skellefteå Kraft Arena, Skellefteå
January 4, 2000	2000 World Junior Championships	Bronze medal game	Canada	4–3 SO (0–1, 1–1, 2–1) (OT: 0–0)	United States	(Sweden) Skellefteå Kraft Arena, Skellefteå
January 2, 2001	2001 World Junior Championships	Quarterfinals	Canada	2–1 (1–1, 0–0, 1–0)	United States	(Russia) Soviet Wings Arena, Moscow
January 3, 2003	2003 World Junior Championships	Semifinals	Canada	3–2 (1–1, 1–0, 1–1)	United States	(Canada) Halifax Metro Centre, Halifax, Nova Scotia
January 5, 2004	2004 World Junior Championships	Final	**United States**	4–3 (1–1, 0–2, 3–0)	Canada	(Finland) Hameenlinna Ice Arena, Hämeenlinna
December 31, 2005	2006 World Junior Championships	Preliminary round	**Canada**	3–2 (2–1, 0–1, 1–0)	United States	(Canada) Pacific Coliseum, Vancouver, British Columbia
December 31, 2006	2007 World Junior Championships	Preliminary round	**Canada**	6–3 (2–0, 1–2, 3–1)	United States	(Sweden) FM Mattsson Arena, Mora
January 3, 2007	2007 World Junior Championships	Semifinals	**Canada**	2–1 SO (0–0, 0–1, 1–0) (OT: 0–0)	United States	(Sweden) Ejendals Arena, Leksand
January 4, 2008	2008 World Junior Championships	Semifinals	**Canada**	4–1 (0–0, 2–0, 2–1)	United States	(Czech Republic) ČEZ Arena, Pardubice
December 31, 2008	2009 World Junior Championships	Preliminary round	**Canada**	7–4 (3–3, 2–1, 2–0)	United States	(Canada) Scotiabank Place, Ottawa, Ontario
December 31, 2009	2010 World Junior Championships	Preliminary round	Canada	5–4 SO (1–1, 1–2, 2–1) (OT: 0–0)	**United States**	(Canada) Credit Union Centre, Saskatoon, Saskatchewan
January 5, 2010	2010 World Junior Championships	Final	**United States**	6–5 OT (2–2, 1–1, 2–2) (OT: 1–0)	Canada	(Canada) Credit Union Centre, Saskatoon, Saskatchewan
January 3, 2011	2011 World Junior Championships	Semifinals	Canada	4–1 (2–0, 1–0, 1–1)	United States	(United States) HSBC Arena, Buffalo, New York
December 31, 2011	2012 World Junior Championships	Preliminary round	Canada	3–2 (3–0, 0–0, 0–2)	United States	(Canada) Rexall Place, Edmonton, Alberta
December 30, 2012	2013 World Junior Championships	Preliminary round	Canada	2–1 (2–0, 0–0, 0–1)	**United States**	(Russia) Ufa Arena, Ufa
January 3, 2013	2013 World Junior Championships	Semifinals	**United States**	5–1 (2–0, 2–0, 1–1)	Canada	(Russia) Ufa Arena, Ufa
August 10, 2013	2013 National Junior Evaluation Camp	Exhibition	United States	5–1 (?–?, ?–?, ?–?)	Canada	(United States) Herb Brooks Arena, Lake Placid, New York
December 31, 2013	2014 World Junior Championships	Preliminary round	Canada	3–2 (0–0, 1–1, 2–1)	United States	(Sweden) Malmö Isstadion, Malmö
December 31, 2014	2015 World Junior Championships	Preliminary round	**Canada**	5–3 (0–0, 2–1, 3–2)	United States	(Canada) Bell Centre, Montreal, Quebec
December 26, 2015	2016 World Junior Championships	Preliminary round	United States	4–2 (0–0, 1–1, 3–1)	Canada	(Finland) Helsinki Ice Hall, Helsinki
August 6, 2016	2016 National Junior Evaluation Camp	Exhibition	United States	5–1 (?–?, ?–?, ?–?)	Canada	(United States) USA Hockey Arena, Plymouth, Michigan
December 31, 2016	2017 World Junior Championships	Preliminary round	**United States**	3–1 (2–0, 1–1, 0–0)	Canada	Air Canada Centre, Toronto, Ontario
January 5, 2017	2017 World Junior Championships	Final	United States	5–4 SO (0–2, 2–0, 2–2) (OT: 0–0)	Canada	(Canada) Bell Centre, Montreal, Quebec
August 5, 2017	2017 World Junior Summer Showcase	Exhibition	United States	7–5 (?–?, ?–?, ?–?)	Canada	(United States) USA Hockey Arena, Plymouth, Michigan
December 29, 2017	2018 World Junior Championships	Preliminary round	United States	4–3 SO (0–2, 1–1, 2–0) (OT: 0–0)	**Canada**	(United States) New Era Field, Orchard Park, New York
August 4, 2018	2018 Sport Chek World Junior Showcase	Exhibition	Canada	6–5 (2–1, 3–2, 1–2)	United States	(Canada) Sandman Centre, Kamloops, British Columbia
July 30, 2019	2019 Sport Chek World Junior Showcase	Exhibition	Canada	4–1 (1–0, 1–0, 2–1)	United States	(United States) USA Hockey Arena, Plymouth, Michigan
August 3, 2019	2019 Sport Chek World Junior Showcase	Exhibition	United States	5–3 (2–1, 1–2, 2–0)	Canada	(United States) USA Hockey Arena, Plymouth, Michigan
December 26, 2019	2020 World Junior Championships	Preliminary round	**Canada**	6–4 (0–2, 3–0, 3–2)	United States	(Czech Republic) Ostravar Aréna, Ostrava
January 5, 2021	2021 World Junior Championships	Final	**United States**	2–0 (1–0, 1–0, 0–0)	Canada	(Canada) Rogers Place, Edmonton, Alberta
January 4, 2023	2023 World Junior Championships	Semifinals	**Canada**	6–2 (1–2, 3–0, 2–0)	United States	(Canada) Scotiabank Centre, Halifax, Nova Scotia
December 31, 2024	2025 World Junior Championships	Preliminary round	**United States**	4–1 (1–0, 0–0, 3–1)	Canada	(Canada) Canadian Tire Centre, Ottawa, Ontario

== See also ==
- Canada–United States women's national ice hockey rivalry
- Team Canada New Year's Eve Game, Canada's annual World Juniors game on New Year's Eve that frequently features the United States
