= Claude Jameson =

American soccer player

Claude Stanley Jameson
Personal information
- Full name: Claude Stanley Jameson
- Date of birth: January 20, 1886
- Place of birth: St. Louis, Missouri, United States
- Date of death: February 12, 1943 (aged 57)
- Place of death: Los Angeles, California, United States
- Position: Forward

Senior career*
Years	Team	Apps	(Gls)
1904	St. Rose Parish		

International career
1904	United States		
Medal record
Bronze medal – third place	1904 Summer Olympics – Football
- * Club domestic league appearances and goals

Olympic medal record

Men's Soccer
Bronze medal – third place	1904 St. Louis	Team competition

Claude Stanley Jameson (January 20, 1886 – February 12, 1943) was an American amateur soccer player who competed in the 1904 Summer Olympics. He was born in St. Louis, Missouri and died in Los Angeles, California. In 1904 he was a member of the St. Rose Parish team, which won the bronze medal in the soccer tournament. He played all four matches as a forward.
