= Ernest Linton =

Canadian soccer player

Olympic medal record

Men's soccer

Representing Canada
Gold medal – first place	1904 St. Louis	Team competition

Albert Ernest Linton (February 17, 1880 – August 6, 1957) was a Canadian amateur soccer player who competed in the 1904 Summer Olympics. Linton was born in Scotland. In 1904 he was a member of the Galt F.C. team, which won the gold medal in the soccer tournament. He played both matches as a goalkeeper, keeping a clean slate in both.
