= Otto Christman =

Canadian soccer player

Olympic medal record

Men's soccer Competitor for Canada
Gold medal – first place	1904 St. Louis	Team competition

Otto Lorne Christman (February 20, 1880 – September 26, 1963) was a Canadian amateur soccer player who competed in the 1904 Summer Olympics. In 1904 Christman was a member of the Galt F.C. team, which won the gold medal in the soccer tournament. He played one match as a midfielder. He died in 1963 in Orillia, Ontario, and is buried in the Elmira Union Cemetery in Waterloo Region, Ontario.
