= Oscar Brockmeyer =

American soccer player

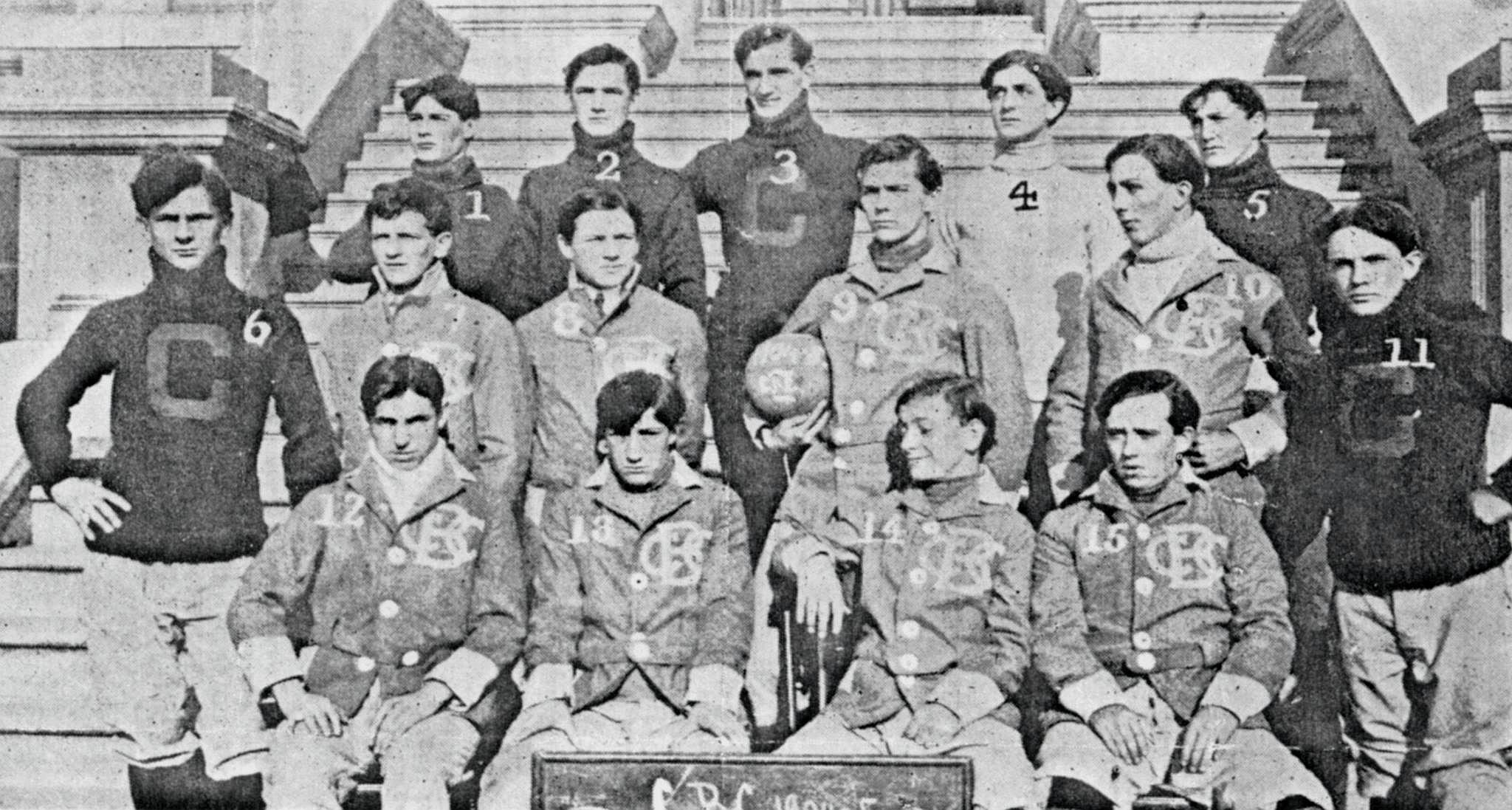
- The soccer team that won the Silver Medal at the 1904 Summer Olympics

Personal information
- Full name: Oscar Bernard Brockmeyer
- Date of birth: November 13, 1883
- Place of birth: St. Louis, Missouri, United States
- Date of death: January 10, 1954 (aged 70)
- Position: Defender

College career
Years	Team	Apps	(Gls)
1904	Christian Brothers Cadets	4	(0)
1905	Missouri Tigers		

International career
1904	United States	4	(0)

Olympic medal record

Men's Soccer
Silver medal – second place	1904 St. Louis	Team competition

Oscar Bernard Brockmeyer (November 13, 1883 – January 10, 1954) was an American amateur soccer player who competed in the 1904 Summer Olympics. He was the son of Dora (Luebbering) and Bernard Henry Brockmeyer, His Grandparents moved from Glane, Germany to St. Louis, Missouri. He had 4 brothers and 3 sisters. He is also the grandson of Johann Friedrich Lübbering.

In 1904 he was a member of the Christian Brothers College team, which won the silver medal in the soccer tournament. He played all four matches as a defender. Oscar graduated in 1904 at C.B.C and went to the University of Missouri in Columbia, Missouri, he had a scholarship there, and played soccer for the Varsity in 1905.

When he came home, he went to work at the City Hall of St. Louis as a draftsman.

== Personal life ==
He married Florence Louise Hoevel (1883–1952) and they had the following children:

- Oscar Bernard Brockmeyer, jr. (1919–1984),
- Charles E. Brockmeyer (1922–1978).
