= William Twaits (soccer) =

Canadian soccer player

Olympic medal record

Men's Soccer

Representing Canada
Gold medal – first place	1904 St. Louis	Team competition

William Twaits (August 20, 1879 – April 13, 1941) was a Canadian amateur soccer player who competed in the 1904 Summer Olympics. Twaits was born in Galt, Ontario. In 1904 he was a member of the Galt F.C. team, which won the gold medal in the soccer tournament. He played all two matches as a forward.
