= Robert Lane (soccer) =

Canadian soccer player

Olympic medal record

Men's soccer

Representing Canada
Gold medal – first place	1904 St. Louis	Team competition

Robert George Lane (January 15, 1882 – November 20, 1940) was a Canadian amateur soccer player who competed in the 1904 Summer Olympics. He was born in Galt, Ontario and died in Winnipeg. In 1904 he was a member of the Galt F.C. team, which won the gold medal in the soccer tournament. He played both matches as a midfielder.
