= Albert Johnson (soccer) =

Canadian soccer player

Personal information
- Born: April 17, 1880
- Died: January 6, 1941 (aged 60)
Medal record
Men's soccer
Representing Canada
Olympic Games
Gold medal – first place	1904 St. Louis	Team competition

Albert Johnson (April 17, 1880 – January 6, 1941) was a Canadian amateur soccer player who competed in the 1904 Summer Olympics. In 1904 he was a member of the Galt F.C. team, which won the gold medal in the soccer tournament. He played all two matches as a midfielder.
