= George Ducker =

Canadian soccer player

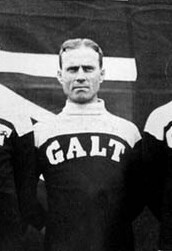

Medal record

Men's soccer

Representing Canada
Gold medal – first place	1904 St. Louis	Team competition

George Ducker (September 27, 1871 – September 26, 1952) was a Canadian amateur soccer player who competed in the 1904 Summer Olympics. Ducker was born in Ontario, Canada. In 1904 he was member of the Galt F.C. team, which won the gold medal in the soccer tournament. He played all two matches as a defender.
