= Albert Henderson (soccer) =

Canadian soccer player

Olympic medal record

Men's soccer

Representing Canada
Gold medal – first place	1904 St. Louis	Team competition

Albert Percy Henderson (29 August 1881 – 20 August 1947) was a Canadian amateur soccer player who competed in the 1904 Summer Olympics. He was born in Galt, Ontario (now Cambridge), and died in Los Angeles, California. In 1904 Henderson was a member of the Galt F.C. team, which won the gold medal in the soccer tournament. He played one match as a forward in which he scored one goal in a 4–0 win over the United States, represented by St. Rose Parish.
