= Charles January =

American soccer player

Personal information
- Full name: Charles James January
- Date of birth: February 1, 1888
- Place of birth: United States
- Date of death: April 26, 1970 (aged 82)
- Place of death: Hidalgo County, Texas, United States
- Position: Midfielder

Senior career*
Years	Team	Apps	(Gls)
1904	Christian Brothers College		

International career
1904	United States		
Medal record
Silver medal – second place	1904 Summer Olympics – Football
- * Club domestic league appearances and goals

Olympic medal record

Men's Soccer
Silver medal – second place	1904 St. Louis	Team competition

Charles James January (February 1, 1888 – April 26, 1970) was an American amateur soccer player who competed in the 1904 Summer Olympics. He died in Hidalgo County, Texas.

In 1904, he was a member of the Christian Brothers College team, which won the silver medal in the soccer tournament. He played all four matches as a midfielder. His older brothers John and Thomas were also members of the silver medal-winning team. His daughter, Lois, was an actress.
