= Raymond Lawler =

American soccer player

Olympic medal record

Men's Soccer
Silver medal – second place	1904 St. Louis	Team competition

Raymond E. Lawler (February 22, 1888 – June 28, 1946) was an American amateur soccer player who competed in the 1904 Summer Olympics. He was born in St. Louis, Missouri. In 1904 he was a member of the Christian Brothers College team, which won the silver medal in the soccer tournament. He played all four matches as a forward.
