= Charles Bartliff =

American soccer player (1886–1962)

Personal information
- Full name: Charles Albert Bartliff
- Date of birth: August 18, 1886
- Place of birth: Memphis, Tennessee, U.S.
- Date of death: March 15, 1962 (aged 75)
- Place of death: Medina, Ohio, U.S.
- Position: Forward

Senior career*
Years	Team	Apps	(Gls)
1904	Christian Brothers College		
- * Club domestic league appearances and goals

Olympic medal record

Men's Soccer
Silver medal – second place	1904 St. Louis	Team competition

Charles Albert Bartliff (August 18, 1886 – March 15, 1962) was an American amateur soccer player who competed in the 1904 Summer Olympics. He was born in Memphis, Tennessee. In 1904 he was a member of the Christian Brothers College team, which won the silver medal in the soccer tournament. He played all four matches as a forward.
