= John January =

American soccer player

Olympic medal record

Men's Soccer
Silver medal – second place	1904 St. Louis	Team competition

John Hartnett January (March 6, 1882 – December 1, 1917) was an American amateur soccer player who competed in the 1904 Summer Olympics.

In 1904 he was a member of the Christian Brothers College team, which won the silver medal in the soccer tournament. He played all four matches as a defender. His younger brothers Charles and Thomas were also members of a silver medal-winning team.
