= Warren Brittingham =

American soccer player

Olympic medal record

Men's Soccer
Silver medal – second place	1904 St. Louis	Team competition

Warren George Brittingham (September 2, 1886 – December 19, 1962) was an American amateur soccer player who competed in the 1904 Summer Olympics. He died in El Paso County, Texas. In 1904 he was a member of the Christian Brothers College team, which won the silver medal in the soccer tournament. He played all four matches as a forward.
