= Peter Ratican =

American soccer player

Olympic medal record

Men's Soccer
Silver medal – second place	1904 St. Louis	Team competition

Peter Joseph Ratican (April 13, 1887 – November 20, 1922) was an American soccer midfielder who competed in the 1904 Summer Olympics. He was born and died in St. Louis, Missouri.

Ratican, older brother to National Soccer Hall of Fame member Harry Ratican, grew up in St. Louis, Missouri where he attended Christian Brothers College. In 1904, St. Louis hosted the 1904 Summer Olympics and CBC entered its men's soccer team into the games. The CBC men took the silver medal, with Ratican playing all four matches as a midfielder. Ratican later played professionally in the St. Louis Soccer League. During the 1909–10 St. Louis Soccer League season, he was with St. Teresa F.C. At the time of his death following brain surgery, Ratican was both the owner of and a player on the Ben Millers.
