= Louis Menges =

American soccer player

Olympic medal record

Men's Soccer
Silver medal – second place	1904 St. Louis	Team competition

Louis John Menges (October 30, 1888 – March 10, 1969) was an American politician, businessman, and amateur soccer player who competed in the 1904 Summer Olympics.

Menges was born in East St. Louis, Illinois and went to the East St. Louis parochial and public schools. In 1904 he was a member of the Christian Brothers College team, which won the silver medal in the soccer tournament. He played all four matches as a goalkeeper. He served in the United States Army during World War I. Menges served in the Illinois Senate from 1935 to 1943 and was a Democrat. He was the owner and builder of movie theaters.
