= Christian Brothers College High School =

Private high school in Town and Country, Missouri, US

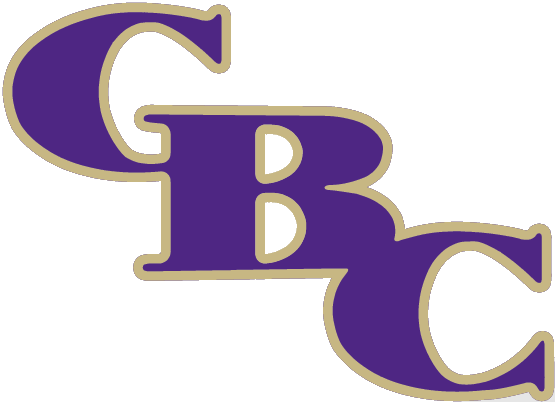

Location
- 1850 De La Salle Drive; St. Louis, Missouri 63141; United States; 38.6397°N 90.4587°W

Information
- Former names: St. Joseph's Academy (1850–1851); Academy of the Christian Brothers (1851–1855)
- Type: Private
- Motto: Religio ∙ Mores ∙ Cultura (Religion ∙ Morals ∙ Culture)
- Religious affiliation: Roman Catholic (De La Salle Brothers)
- Patron saint: John Baptist de La Salle
- Established: 1850; 176 years ago
- Sister school: Incarnate Word Academy
- Oversight: The Christian Brothers of the Midwest
- President: Philip Riley (2024)
- Dean: Jeff Myer
- Principal: Timothy Seymour
- Grades: 9–12
- Gender: Boys
- Enrollment: 860 (2023)
- Colors: Purple and Vegas gold
- Athletics conference: Metro Catholic Conference
- Team name: Cadets
- Rivals: St. Louis University High School, De Smet Jesuit High School
- Accreditation: Cognia
- Newspaper: The Turret
- Yearbook: The Guidon
- Tuition: $19,120 (2024–25)
- Website: cbchs.org
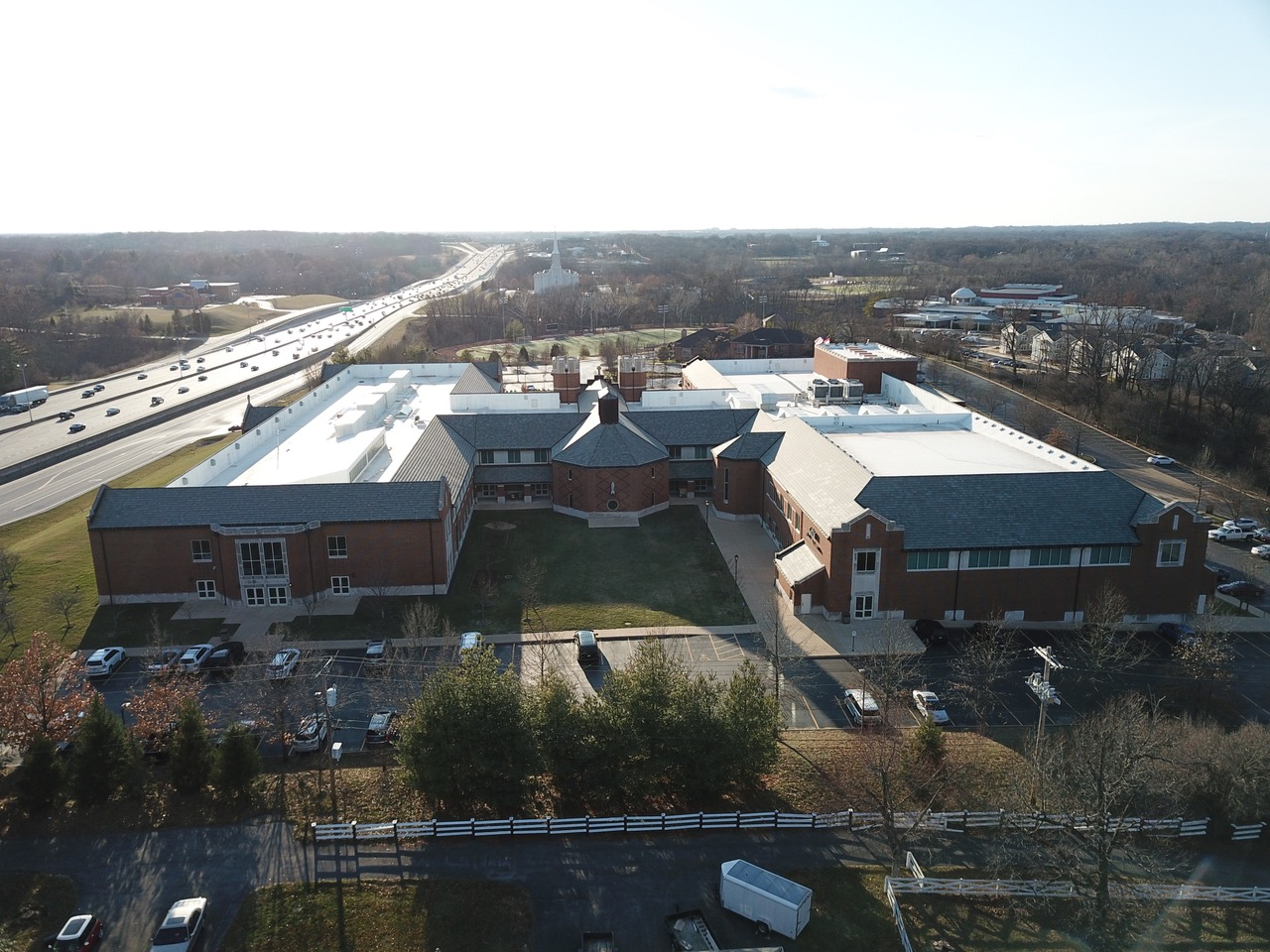
- Aerial view of the school in 2018

Christian Brothers College High School (CBC High School) is a Lasallian Catholic college-preparatory school for young men in Town and Country, Missouri, a suburb of St. Louis. It is located in the Archdiocese of St. Louis and is owned and operated by the De La Salle Brothers.

== History ==
The school was founded in 1850 under the name "St. Joseph's Academy" by three French-speaking Christian Brothers who had come to St. Louis the previous year from Montreal, Canada. In 1851 the school moved from its original location at 16th and Market Street to 8th and Cerre Street in downtown St. Louis, and the name changed to the "Academy of the Christian Brothers." In December 1855, the school was granted a college charter, becoming the Brothers' first U.S. institution to operate at the collegiate level.

On October 5, 1916, a fire destroyed the school,

In January 2006, CBC announced plans to begin drug testing all students during the 2007–08 academic year. The school became the first private school in the West St. Louis area to implement such testing, and the proposal received widespread press coverage.

== Notable alumni ==
=== Arts ===
- King Baggot, star of the silent film era
- Mike Peters, Pulitzer Prize-winning editorial cartoonist for the Dayton Daily News and author of the popular comic strip Mother Goose and Grimm

=== Politics ===
- Jack Buechner, congressman and former state legislator
- Michael Burton, member of the Missouri House of Representatives and former actor
- Joseph M. Darst, former mayor of St. Louis (1949–1953)
- William L. Ewing, mayor of St. Louis (1881–1885)
- Harold A. Moise, member of the Louisiana Supreme Court (1948 to 1958)

=== Athletics ===
- 1904 Olympic soccer medalists: Charles Bartliff, Warren Brittingham, Oscar Brockmeyer, Alexander Cudmore, Charles January, John January, Thomas January, Raymond Lawler, Louis Menges, Peter Ratican
- Jake Burger, baseball player for Texas Rangers
- Cameron Brown, professional football player, NFL & XFL
- Herb Donaldson, former NFL player
- Brett Gabbert, quarterback for the Miami Dolphins
- Culver Hastedt, runner and two-time gold medalist at the 1904 Summer Olympics; also won numerous "Open" Olympic events in 1904 representing CBC and the Missouri Athletic Club
- Larry Hughes, NBA shooting guard with Philadelphia 76ers, Golden State Warriors, Washington Wizards, Cleveland Cavaliers, Chicago Bulls, New York Knicks, Charlotte Bobcats, and Orlando Magic
- Joseph Lydon, boxer and bronze medalist at the 1904 Summer Olympics; also played for the CBC soccer team that won the silver medal
- John Kelly, amateur golfer, runner-up in the 2006 U.S. Amateur (Golf) Championship
- Christian Little, baseball player
- Caleb Love, Portland Trail Blazers basketball player
- Jeremiyah Love, NFL running back for the Arizona Cardinals
- Patrick McCaw, NBA player with Toronto Raptors
- Philip McRae, NHL player with St. Louis Blues
- Hughie Miller, baseball player
- Don Mueller, MLB player with New York Giants, Chicago White Sox, 2-time All-Star
- Jeff Otis, former NFL quarterback
- Jonathan Owens, NFL safety
- Mike Shannon, Major League Baseball player for St. Louis Cardinals and sports broadcaster
- Harry Swacina, Major League Baseball player for Pittsburgh Pirates and Baltimore Terrapins
- Justin Tatum, basketball player and coach
- Matt Vierling, Major League Baseball player for the Philadelphia Phillies and the Detroit Tigers
- Joe Vitale, retired NHL player and current radio color analyst for the St. Louis Blues
- Armon Watts, NFL defensive tackle
- Nazzan Zanetello, baseball player

==== Professional soccer ====
- Brandon Barklage, professional soccer player with New York Red Bulls
- A. J. Cochran, professional soccer player, MLS & USL
- Daryl Doran, indoor soccer player, jersey retired by St. Louis Steamers in 2006
- Don Droege, professional soccer player
- Jimmy Dunn, soccer player and National Soccer Hall of Fame inductee
- Mike Freitag, professional soccer player and college coach
- Carl Gentile, professional soccer player
- Tommy Heinemann, professional soccer player with Vancouver Whitecaps FC
- Tom Howe, professional soccer player
- Harry Ratican, soccer player and National Soccer Hall of Fame inductee
- Jimmy Roe, soccer player and National Soccer Hall of Fame inductee
- Mark Santel, professional soccer player

=== Other ===
- Martin Stanislaus Brennan, American Catholic priest and scientist
- Mark Hertling, U.S. Army lieutenant general
- Martin Kilcoyne, sportscaster
- Thomas Licavoli, former gangster/bootlegger
- Harold A. Moise, associate justice of the Louisiana Supreme Court, 1948–1958
- Owen Shroyer, political activist
- Benedict T. Viviano, New Testament scholar and author
