= Thomas January =

American soccer player

Olympic medal record

Men's Soccer
Silver medal – second place	1904 St. Louis	Team competition

Thomas Thurston January (January 8, 1886 – January 25, 1957) was an American amateur soccer player who competed in the 1904 Summer Olympics.

In 1904 he was a member of the Christian Brothers College team, which won the silver medal in the soccer tournament. He played all four matches as a midfielder. His older brother John and younger brother Charles were also members of a silver medal-winning team.
