= Football at the 1904 Summer Olympics =

Tournament details
- Host country: United States
- City: St. Louis
- Dates: November 16–23, 1904
- Teams: 3
- Venue: Francis Olympic Field

Final positions
- Champions: (Canada) Galt FC (1st title)
- Runners-up: (United States) Christian Brothers College
- Third place: (United States) St. Rose Parish

Tournament statistics
- Matches played: 4
- Goals scored: 13 (3.25 per match)
- Top scorer(s): (Canada) Alexander Hall (Canada) Thomas Taylor (3 goals each)
- 4 matches played includes 1 replay

Men's association football (soccer) was contested at the 1904 Summer Olympics. A total of three club teams competed, two representing the United States, both from host city St. Louis, and one representing Canada, from Galt (now Cambridge), Ontario. Originally, two other Canadian teams had also been entered in the competition, Berlin Rangers and the University of Toronto, but both withdrew before the draw.

The 1904 Olympic Games were spread over several months, linked to the St. Louis World's Fair, and football, in November, was the last sport to be contested. The tournament was played as a straight round-robin, although the game between Christian Brothers College and St. Rose Parish was replayed due to a draw in their first game.

Gold medals were awarded at these Olympics for the first time. Galt F.C. (Canada) won the gold medal, Christian Brothers College (United States) the silver, and St. Rose Parish (United States) the bronze. These results are the best that either Canada or the United States have achieved in men's Olympic football. The 1904 contest is considered to be an official contest by IOC, although not by FIFA because no national teams were involved in the competition.

== Teams entered ==
- Canada (14)
  - Galt FC
- United States (23)
  - Christian Brothers College (11)
  - St. Rose Parish (12)

== Competition schedule ==
The match schedule of the tournament.

Legend
RR	Round-robin	R	Replay

Wed 16	Thu 17	Fri 18	Sat 19	Sun 20	Mon 21	Tue 22	Wed 23
RR	RR			RR			R

== Venue ==
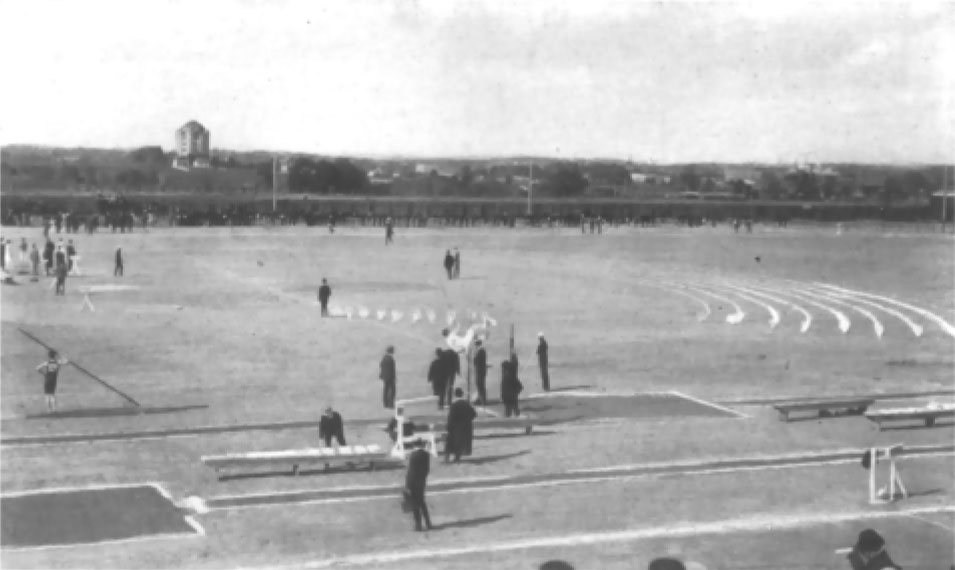
Francis Olympic Field hosted all the matches

== Matches ==
Galt F.C. had little difficulty with either of the significantly younger U.S. squads, defeating them both without conceding a goal. The U.S. teams played a scoreless draw before Christian Brothers College won a rematch against St. Rose Parish, 2–0.

November 16, 1904

Christian Brothers College (United States)	0–7	(Canada) Galt FC
	Report; Report 2	Steep; Taylor; McDonald; Hall

Francis Olympic Field, St. Louis
Referee: Paul McSweeney (United States)

November 17, 1904

St. Rose Parish (United States)	0–4	(Canada) Galt FC
	Report	Taylor; Henderson; Unknown (o.g.)

Francis Olympic Field, St. Louis
Referee: Paul McSweeney (United States)

Team details

GK	Frank Frost
RB	George Cooke
LB	Henry Jameson
RH	Joseph Brady
CH	Edward Dierkes
LH	Martin Dooling
OR	Cormic Cosgrove
IR	Leo O'Connell
CF	Claude Jameson
IL	Harry Tate
OL	Thomas Cooke

GK	Ernest Linton
RB	George Ducker
LB	John Gourlay (c)
RH	Robert Lane
CH	Albert Johnston
LH	Otto Christman
OR	Thomas Taylor
IR	Frederick Steep
CF	Alexander Hall
IL	Albert Henderson
OL	William Twaits

November 20, 1904

Christian Brothers College (United States)	0–0	(United States) St. Rose Parish
	Report

Francis Olympic Field, St. Louis
Referee: Armstrong (United States)

November 23, 1904
Replay

Christian Brothers College (United States)	2–0	(United States) St. Rose Parish
Unknown	Report

Francis Olympic Field, St. Louis
Referee: Armstrong (United States)

=== Final ranking ===
Pos	Team	Pld	W	D	L	GF	GA	GD	Pts	Final result
1	(Canada) Galt FC (C)	2	2	0	0	11	0	+11	4	Champions
2	(United States) Christian Brothers College (H)	3	1	1	1	2	7	−5	3	
3	(United States) St. Rose Parish (H)	3	0	1	2	0	6	−6	1	

Source: RSSF
(C) Champions; (H) Hosts

== Medal summary ==
=== Medal table ===
According to a report in the Toronto Mail and Empire newspaper of November 18, 1904, medals were awarded to the players in St. Louis. The report states that "Immediately after the game, the Galt aggregation, numbering about 50 persons, retired to the office of James E. Sullivan, chief of the Department of Physical Culture, where they received their prize. After a talk by Mr. James A. Conlon, of the Physical Culture Department, Mayor Mundy, of the City of Galt, presented each player on the winning team with a beautiful gold medal." The medal awarded to Fred Steep of Galt, held by The Soccer Hall of Fame and Museum in Vaughan, Ontario, clearly shows that the medals were made in St. Louis, Missouri.

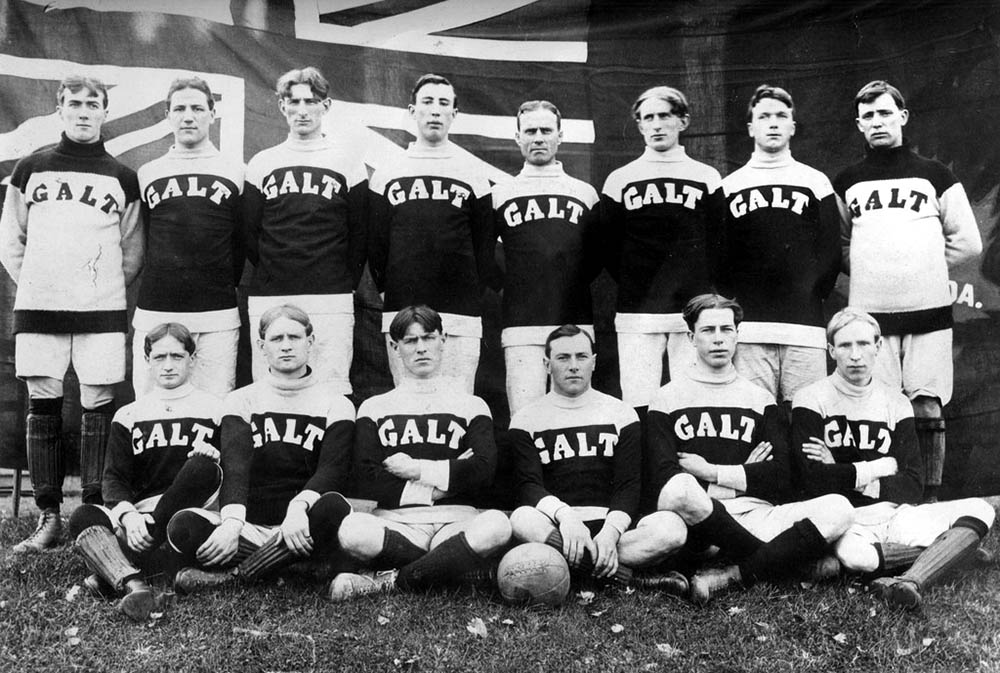
Canadian team Galt F.C. won the Gold Medal

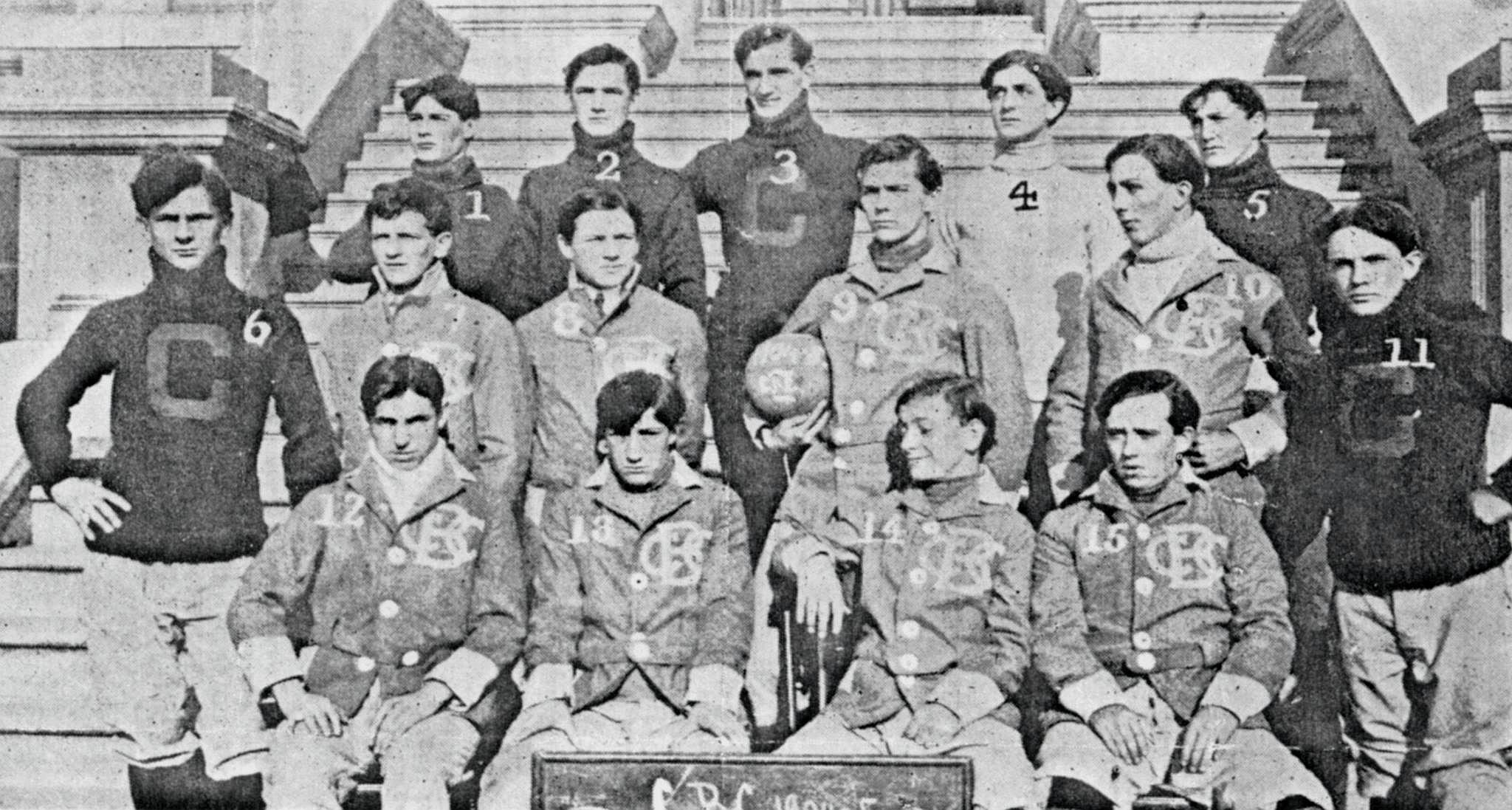
St. Louis team Christian Brothers College won the Silver Medal

Rank	Nation	Gold	Silver	Bronze	Total
1	Canada	1	0	0	1
2	United States	0	1	1	2
Totals (2 entries)		1	1	1	3

=== Medalists ===
Event	Gold	Silver	Bronze
Men's football	Canada; Galt F.C. Otto Christman; George Ducker; John Fraser; John Gourlay; Alexander Hall; Albert Henderson; Albert Johnston; Robert Lane; Ernest Linton; Gordon McDonald; Frederick Steep; Tom Taylor; William Twaits	United States; Christian Brothers College; Charles Bartliff; Warren Brittingham; Oscar Brockmeyer; Alexander Cudmore; Charles January; John January; Thomas January; Raymond Lawler; Joseph Lydon; Louis Menges; Peter Ratican	United States; St. Rose Parish; Joseph Brady; George Cooke; Thomas Cooke; Cormic Cosgrove; Edward Dierkes; Martin Dooling; Frank Frost; Claude Jameson; Henry Jameson; Johnson; Leo O'Connell; Harry Tate

== Statistics ==
=== Goalscorers ===
There were 13 goals scored in 4 matches, for an average of 3.25 goals per match.

3 goals

- (Canada) Alexander Hall – Galt
- (Canada) Thomas Taylor – Galt

2 goals

- (Canada) Gordon McDonald – Galt
- (United States) Unknown – Christian Brothers College

1 goal

- (Canada) Frederick Steep – Galt
- (Canada) Albert Henderson – Galt

1 own goal

- (United States) Unknown – St. Rose Parish (against Galt)
