= Christian Brothers Cadets men's soccer =

American college soccer team

Christian Brothers College men's soccer
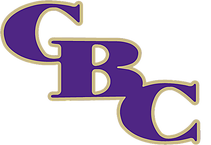
- Founded: 1870
- Folded: 1930
- University: Christian Brothers College
- Location: St. Louis, Missouri
- Nickname: Collegians

Pre-tournament ASHA championships
- 1890, 1891, 1892, 1893, 1894, 1895, 1896, 1897, 1898, 1899, 1900, 1901, 1902, 1903, 1904

Pre-tournament ISFA/ISFL championships
- 1905

Olympic medal record

Men's soccer
| Silver medal – second place | 1904 St. Louis | Team |

The Christian Brothers Cadets men's soccer team was a varsity college soccer team that represented the Christian Brothers College (now a high school) from the 1870s until the 1910s.

The team is best known for being one of the most dominant pre-regulation college soccer programs in the United States, retroactively winning ASHA and IFRA pre-regulation national championships. In total, the Cadets won 16 consecutive national championships between 1890 and 1905. The 1905 title was shared with Haverford College by the Intercollegiate Soccer Football League, which was the governing body of college soccer in the United States from 1904 until 1958 (the NCAA began governing college soccer in 1959).

Since at least the 1930s the program was downgraded to a high school boys' school program, where they would win 10 state championships in Missouri.

== Honors ==
Domestic

- ASHA/IFRA National Championship
  - Winners (15): 1890, 1891, 1892, 1893, 1894, 1895, 1896, 1897, 1898, 1899, 1900, 1901, 1902, 1903, 1904
- ISFL National Championship
  - Winners (1): 1905 (shared)

International

- Olympic Games
  - Silver medalists (1): 1904

== See also ==
- 1904–05 Christian Brothers Cadets men's soccer team
