= Galt F.C. =

Canadian soccer team (1881/82–1910)

Galt FC
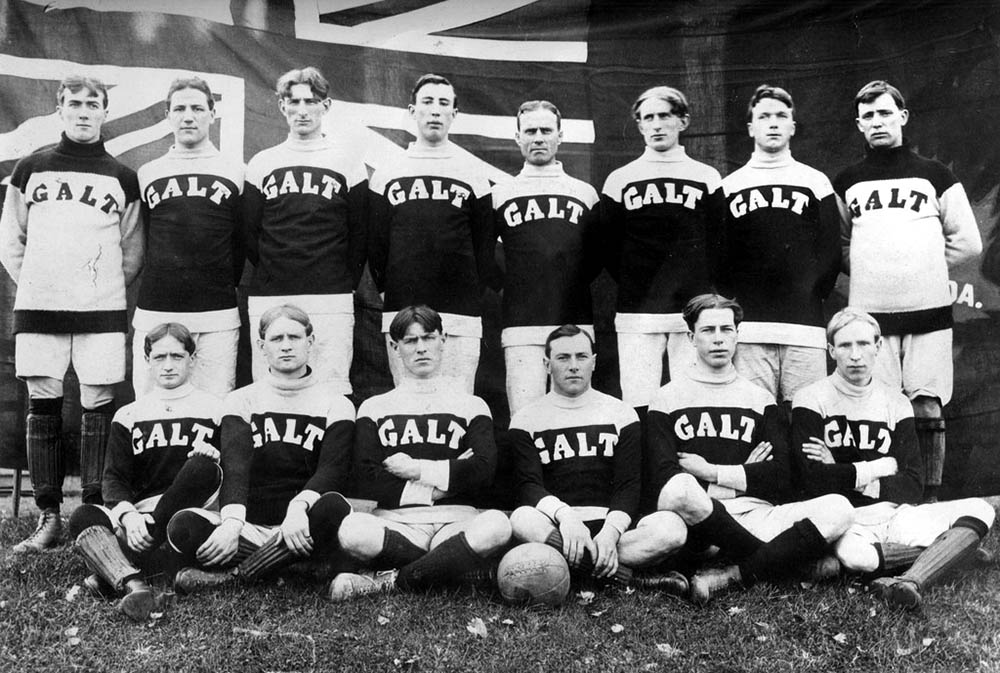
- Galt F.C. in 1904
- Full name: Galt Football Club
- Founded: 1881 or 1882
- Dissolved: 1910; 116 years ago
- League: Ontario Football Association

Olympic medal record

Men's soccer
Gold medal – first place	1904 St. Louis	Team

Galt Football Club was a soccer club based in Galt, Ontario, current day Cambridge, Ontario. It was formed in either 1881 or 1882. Galt won the 1901, 1902, and 1903 Ontario Cups, and most notably the 1904 Olympic soccer tournament.

== History ==
Galt was historically one of the greatest soccer clubs in Canada. Their first major honour came in the form of the 1901 Ontario Cup and they repeated this success as champions in the next two seasons. In 1903, Galt went on a tour of Manitoba. In a span of 25 days, which included 17 games, Galt won 16 and tied 1. On that tour, they scored 46 goals and conceded 2.

Galt's most notable triumph came in 1904 at the Olympics in St. Louis, where they represented Canada. They had to face two American sides. Winning convincingly, 7–0 and 4–0, Galt took home gold for Canada. That team was constructed of the following players; Ernest Linton, John Gourlay (team captain), George Ducker, Bobby Lane, Albert Johnston, Jack Fraser, Otto Christman, William Twaits, Thomas Taylor, Frederick Steep, Gordon McDonald, Alexander Hall, Albert Henderson and Parnell Gourlay.

In 1905, Galt played a touring English team called The Pilgrims. The game was dubbed "The Championship of the World", considering Galt were reigning Olympic champions. The game drew much attention in Canada and the Northern United States. At Dickson Park, in front of 3,500 fans, Galt tied the English team 3–3.

In 2004, on the centennial anniversary of the gold medal, the 1904 Galt team were inducted to the Canadian Soccer Hall of Fame.

== In popular culture ==
In 2016, the Galt F.C. Olympic gold medal-winning effort was featured in two episodes of season 10 of the Canadian series the Murdoch Mysteries. In the episode "Bend It Like Brackenreid", the Inspector Thomas Brackenreid character investigates the (fictional) murder of a Galt player during an exhibition tournament in Toronto before the Olympic tournament; in the episode "Excitable Chap", Brackenreid brings the gold medal to show his Toronto police colleagues.

== Honours ==
Domestic

- WFA Challenge Cup
  - Winners (9): 1885–86, 1886–87, 1893 (Spring), 1901, 1902, 1903, 1904, 1910 (Fall), 1920
- Ontario Cup
  - Winners (4): 1901, 1902, 1903, 1910

International

- Olympic Games
  - Gold medalists (1): 1904

== See also ==
- Football at the 1904 Summer Olympics – Men's team squads
