= List of Olympic medalists in rowing (men) =

This is the complete list of men's Olympic medalists in rowing.

== Current program ==
=== Single sculls ===
Games	Gold	Silver	Bronze
1900 Paris	Hermann Barrelet; France	André Gaudin; France	Saint-George Ashe; Great Britain
1904 St. Louis	Frank Greer; United States	James Juvenal; United States	Constance Titus; United States
1908 London	Harry Blackstaffe; Great Britain	Alexander McCulloch; Great Britain	Bernhard von Gaza; Germany
1908 London	Harry Blackstaffe; Great Britain	Alexander McCulloch; Great Britain	Károly Levitzky; Hungary
1912 Stockholm	Wally Kinnear; Great Britain	Polydore Veirman; Belgium	Everard Butler; Canada
1912 Stockholm	Wally Kinnear; Great Britain	Polydore Veirman; Belgium	Mart Kuusik; Russia
1920 Antwerp	John B. Kelly Sr. United States	Jack Beresford; Great Britain	Darcy Hadfield; New Zealand
1924 Paris	Jack Beresford; Great Britain	William Gilmore; United States	Josef Schneider; Switzerland
1928 Amsterdam	Bobby Pearce; Australia	Ken Myers; United States	David Collet; Great Britain
1932 Los Angeles	Bobby Pearce; Australia	William Miller; United States	Guillermo Douglas; Uruguay
1936 Berlin	Gustav Schäfer; Germany	Josef Hasenöhrl; Austria	Dan Barrow; United States
1948 London	Mervyn Wood; Australia	Eduardo Risso; Uruguay	Romolo Catasta; Italy
1952 Helsinki	Yuriy Tyukalov; Soviet Union	Mervyn Wood; Australia	Teodor Kocerka; Poland
1956 Melbourne	Vyacheslav Ivanov; Soviet Union	Stuart Mackenzie; Australia	John B. Kelly Jr. United States
1960 Rome	Vyacheslav Ivanov; Soviet Union	Achim Hill; United Team of Germany	Teodor Kocerka; Poland
1964 Tokyo	Vyacheslav Ivanov; Soviet Union	Achim Hill; United Team of Germany	Gottfried Kottmann; Switzerland
1968 Mexico City	Jan Wienese; Netherlands	Jochen Meißner; West Germany	Alberto Demiddi; Argentina
1972 Munich	Yury Malyshev; Soviet Union	Alberto Demiddi; Argentina	Wolfgang Güldenpfennig; East Germany
1976 Montreal	Pertti Karppinen; Finland	Peter-Michael Kolbe; West Germany	Joachim Dreifke; East Germany
1980 Moscow	Pertti Karppinen; Finland	Vasil Yakusha; Soviet Union	Peter Kersten; East Germany
1984 Los Angeles	Pertti Karppinen; Finland	Peter-Michael Kolbe; West Germany	Robert Mills; Canada
1988 Seoul	Thomas Lange; East Germany	Peter-Michael Kolbe; West Germany	Eric Verdonk; New Zealand
1992 Barcelona	Thomas Lange; Germany	Václav Chalupa; Czechoslovakia	Kajetan Broniewski; Poland
1996 Atlanta	Xeno Müller; Switzerland	Derek Porter; Canada	Thomas Lange; Germany
2000 Sydney	Rob Waddell; New Zealand	Xeno Müller; Switzerland	Marcel Hacker; Germany
2004 Athens	Olaf Tufte; Norway	Jüri Jaanson; Estonia	Ivo Yanakiev; Bulgaria
2008 Beijing	Olaf Tufte; Norway	Ondřej Synek; Czech Republic	Mahé Drysdale; New Zealand
2012 London	Mahé Drysdale; New Zealand	Ondřej Synek; Czech Republic	Alan Campbell; Great Britain
2016 Rio de Janeiro	Mahé Drysdale; New Zealand	Damir Martin; Croatia	Ondřej Synek; Czech Republic
2020 Tokyo	Stefanos Ntouskos; Greece	Kjetil Borch; Norway	Damir Martin; Croatia
2024 Paris	Oliver Zeidler; Germany	Yauheni Zalaty; Individual Neutral Athletes	Simon van Dorp; Netherlands
2028 Los Angeles			

=== Double sculls ===
Games	Gold	Silver	Bronze
1904 St. Louis	John Mulcahy and William Varley (USA)	Jamie McLoughlin and John Hoben (USA)	Joseph Ravannack and John Wells (USA)
1908–1912	not included in the Olympic program		
1920 Antwerp	Paul Costello and John B. Kelly Sr. (USA)	Pietro Annoni and Erminio Dones (ITA)	Gaston Giran and Alfred Plé (FRA)
1924 Paris	Paul Costello and John B. Kelly Sr. (USA)	Marc Detton and Jean-Pierre Stock (FRA)	Rudolf Bosshard and Heini Thoma (SUI)
1928 Amsterdam	Paul Costello and Charles McIlvaine (USA)	Joseph Wright Jr. and Jack Guest (CAN)	Leo Losert and Viktor Flessl (AUT)
1932 Los Angeles	Ken Myers and William Gilmore (USA)	Herbert Buhtz and Gerhard Boetzelen (GER)	Charles Pratt and Noël de Mille (CAN)
1936 Berlin	Jack Beresford and Dick Southwood (GBR)	Willi Kaidel and Joachim Pirsch (GER)	Roger Verey and Jerzy Ustupski (POL)
1948 London	Richard Burnell and Bertie Bushnell (GBR)	Ebbe Parsner and Aage Larsen (DEN)	William Jones and Juan Rodríguez (URU)
1952 Helsinki	Tranquilo Cappozzo and Eduardo Guerrero (ARG)	Heorhiy Zhylin and Ihor Yemchuk (URS)	Miguel Seijas and Juan Rodríguez (URU)
1956 Melbourne	Aleksandr Berkutov and Yuriy Tyukalov (URS)	Pat Costello and James Gardiner (USA)	Murray Riley and Mervyn Wood (AUS)
1960 Rome	Václav Kozák and Pavel Schmidt (TCH)	Aleksandr Berkutov and Yuriy Tyukalov (URS)	Ernst Hürlimann and Rolf Larcher (SUI)
1964 Tokyo	Oleg Tyurin and Boris Dubrovskiy (URS)	Seymour Cromwell and Jim Storm (USA)	Vladimír Andrs and Pavel Hofmann (TCH)
1968 Mexico City	Aleksandr Timoshinin and Anatoliy Sass (URS)	Harry Droog and Leendert van Dis (NED)	John Nunn and Bill Maher (USA)
1972 Munich	Aleksandr Timoshinin and Gennadi Korshikov (URS)	Frank Hansen and Svein Thøgersen (NOR)	Joachim Böhmer and Uli Schmied (GDR)
1976 Montreal	Frank Hansen and Alf Hansen (NOR)	Chris Baillieu and Michael Hart (GBR)	Jürgen Bertow and Uli Schmied (GDR)
1980 Moscow	Joachim Dreifke and Klaus Kröppelien (GDR)	Zoran Pančić and Milorad Stanulov (YUG)	Zdeněk Pecka and Václav Vochoska (TCH)
1984 Los Angeles	Brad Alan Lewis and Paul Enquist (USA)	Pierre-Marie Deloof and Dirk Crois (BEL)	Zoran Pančić and Milorad Stanulov (YUG)
1988 Seoul	Nico Rienks and Ronald Florijn (NED)	Beat Schwerzmann and Ueli Bodenmann (SUI)	Oleksandr Marchenko and Vasil Yakusha (URS)
1992 Barcelona	Peter Antonie and Stephen Hawkins (AUS)	Arnold Jonke and Christoph Zerbst (AUT)	Nico Rienks and Henk-Jan Zwolle (NED)
1996 Atlanta	Agostino Abbagnale and Davide Tizzano (ITA)	Steffen Størseth and Kjetil Undset (NOR)	Frédéric Kowal and Samuel Barathay (FRA)
2000 Sydney	Luka Špik and Iztok Čop (SLO)	Olaf Tufte and Fredrik Bekken (NOR)	Giovanni Calabrese and Nicola Sartori (ITA)
2004 Athens	Sébastien Vieilledent and Adrien Hardy (FRA)	Iztok Čop and Luka Špik (SLO)	Rossano Galtarossa and Alessio Sartori (ITA)
2008 Beijing	David Crawshay and Scott Brennan (AUS)	Tõnu Endrekson and Jüri Jaanson (EST)	Stephen Rowbotham and Matthew Wells (GBR)
2012 London	Nathan Cohen and Joseph Sullivan (NZL)	Alessio Sartori and Romano Battisti (ITA)	Luka Špik and Iztok Čop (SLO)
2016 Rio de Janeiro	Martin Sinković and Valent Sinković (CRO)	Mindaugas Griškonis and Saulius Ritter (LTU)	Kjetil Borch and Olaf Tufte (NOR)
2020 Tokyo	Hugo Boucheron and Matthieu Androdias (FRA)	Melvin Twellaar and Stef Broenink (NED)	Liu Zhiyu and Zhang Liang (CHN)
2024 Paris	Andrei Cornea and Marian Enache (ROU)	Melvin Twellaar and Stef Broenink (NED)	Daire Lynch and Philip Doyle (IRL)
2028 Los Angeles			

=== Quadruple sculls ===
Games	Gold	Silver	Bronze
1976 Montreal	East Germany; Wolfgang Güldenpfennig; Rüdiger Reiche; Karl-Heinz Bußert; Michael Wolfgramm	Soviet Union; Yevgeniy Duleyev; Yuriy Yakimov; Aivars Lazdenieks; Vytautas Butkus	Czechoslovakia; Jaroslav Hellebrand; Zdeněk Pecka; Václav Vochoska; Vladek Lacina
1980 Moscow	East Germany; Frank Dundr; Carsten Bunk; Uwe Heppner; Martin Winter	Soviet Union; Yuriy Shapochka; Evgeni Barbakov; Valeri Kleshnyov; Mykola Dovhan	Bulgaria; Mincho Nikolov; Lyubomir Petrov; Ivo Rusev; Bogdan Dobrev
1984 Los Angeles	West Germany; Albert Hedderich; Raimund Hörmann; Dieter Wiedenmann; Michael Dürsch	Australia; Paul Reedy; Gary Gullock; Timothy McLaren; Anthony Lovrich	Canada; Doug Hamilton; Mike Hughes; Phil Monckton; Bruce Ford
1988 Seoul	Italy; Agostino Abbagnale; Davide Tizzano; Gianluca Farina; Piero Poli	Norway; Alf Hansen; Rolf Thorsen; Lars Bjønness; Vetle Vinje	East Germany; Jens Köppen; Steffen Zühlke; Steffen Bogs; Heiko Habermann
1992 Barcelona	Germany; Andreas Hajek; Michael Steinbach; Stephan Volkert; André Willms	Norway; Kjetil Undset; Per Sætersdal; Lars Bjønness; Rolf Thorsen	Italy; Alessandro Corona; Gianluca Farina; Rossano Galtarossa; Filippo Soffici
1996 Atlanta	Germany; Andreas Hajek; Stephan Volkert; André Steiner; André Willms	United States; Tim Young; Eric Mueller; Brian Jamieson; Jason Gailes	Australia; Janusz Hooker; Bo Hanson; Duncan Free; Ronald Snook
2000 Sydney	Italy; Agostino Abbagnale; Alessio Sartori; Rossano Galtarossa; Simone Raineri	Netherlands; Jochem Verberne; Dirk Lippits; Diederik Simon; Michiel Bartman	Germany; Marco Geisler; Andreas Hajek; Stephan Volkert; André Willms
2004 Athens	Russia; Nikolay Spinyov; Igor Kravtsov; Aleksey Svirin; Sergey Fedorovtsev	Czech Republic; David Kopřiva; Tomáš Karas; Jakub Hanák; David Jirka	Ukraine; Sergij Grin; Serhiy Biloushchenko; Oleh Lykov; Leonid Shaposhnykov
2008 Beijing	Poland; Konrad Wasielewski; Marek Kolbowicz; Michał Jeliński; Adam Korol	Italy; Luca Agamennoni; Simone Venier; Rossano Galtarossa; Simone Raineri	France; Jonathan Coeffic; Pierre-Jean Peltier; Julien Bahain; Cédric Berrest
2012 London	Germany; Karl Schulze; Philipp Wende; Lauritz Schoof; Tim Grohmann	Croatia; David Šain; Martin Sinković; Damir Martin; Valent Sinković	Australia; Chris Morgan; Karsten Forsterling; James McRae; Daniel Noonan
2016 Rio de Janeiro	Germany; Philipp Wende; Lauritz Schoof; Karl Schulze; Hans Gruhne	Australia; Karsten Forsterling; Alexander Belonogoff; Cameron Girdlestone; James McRae	Estonia; Andrei Jämsä; Allar Raja; Tõnu Endrekson; Kaspar Taimsoo
2020 Tokyo	Netherlands; Dirk Uittenbogaard; Abe Wiersma; Tone Wieten; Koen Metsemakers	Great Britain; Harry Leask; Angus Groom; Tom Barras; Jack Beaumont	Australia; Jack Cleary; Caleb Antill; Cameron Girdlestone; Luke Letcher
2024 Paris	Netherlands; Lennart van Lierop; Finn Florijn; Tone Wieten; Koen Metsemakers	Italy; Luca Chiumento; Luca Rambaldi; Giacomo Gentili; Andrea Panizza	Poland; Fabian Barański; Mateusz Biskup; Dominik Czaja; Mirosław Ziętarski
2028 Los Angeles			

=== Coxless pairs ===
Games	Gold	Silver	Bronze
1904 St. Louis	Robert Farnan and Joseph Ryan (USA)	John Mulcahy and William Varley (USA)	John Joachim and Joseph Buerger (USA)
1908 London	John Fenning and Gordon Thomson (GBR)	George Fairbairn and Philip Verdon (GBR)	Frederick Toms and Norway Jackes (CAN)
1908 London	John Fenning and Gordon Thomson (GBR)	George Fairbairn and Philip Verdon (GBR)	Martin Stahnke and Willy Düskow (GER)
1912–1920	not included in the Olympic program		
1924 Paris	Teun Beijnen and Willy Rösingh (NED)	Maurice Monney-Bouton and Georges Piot (FRA)	none awarded (Note: The official report shows a team from Great Britain (C. Killig and C. Southgate) ranked third, but they did not start in the final race with the other two pairs and the IOC medal database does not credit the pair with a bronze medal.)
1928 Amsterdam	Kurt Moeschter and Bruno Müller (GER)	Terence O'Brien and Robert Nisbet (GBR)	Paul McDowell and John Schmitt (USA)
1932 Los Angeles	Lewis Clive and Hugh Edwards (GBR)	Cyril Stiles and Rangi Thompson (NZL)	Henryk Budziński and Jan Mikołajczak (POL)
1936 Berlin	Willi Eichhorn and Hugo Strauß (GER)	Harry Larsen and Richard Olsen (DEN)	Horacio Podestá and Julio Curatella (ARG)
1948 London	John Wilson and Ran Laurie (GBR)	Hans Kalt and Josef Kalt (SUI)	Felice Fanetti and Bruno Boni (ITA)
1952 Helsinki	Charlie Logg and Thomas Price (USA)	Michel Knuysen and Bob Baetens (BEL)	Kurt Schmid and Hans Kalt (SUI)
1956 Melbourne	James Fifer and Duvall Hecht (USA)	Igor Buldakov and Viktor Ivanov (URS)	Josef Kloimstein and Alfred Sageder (AUT)
1960 Rome	Valentin Boreyko and Oleg Golovanov (URS)	Josef Kloimstein and Alfred Sageder (AUT)	Veli Lehtelä and Toimi Pitkänen (FIN)
1964 Tokyo	George Hungerford and Roger Jackson (CAN)	Steven Blaisse and Ernst Veenemans (NED)	Michael Schwan and Wolfgang Hottenrott (EUA)
1968 Mexico City	Jörg Lucke and Heinz-Jürgen Bothe (GDR)	Larry Hough and Philip Johnson (USA)	Peter Christiansen and Ib Larsen (DEN)
1972 Munich	Siegfried Brietzke and Wolfgang Mager (GDR)	Heinrich Fischer and Alfred Bachmann (SUI)	Roel Luynenburg and Ruud Stokvis (NED)
1976 Montreal	Bernd Landvoigt and Jörg Landvoigt (GDR)	Calvin Coffey and Michael Staines (USA)	Peter van Roye and Thomas Strauß (FRG)
1980 Moscow	Bernd Landvoigt and Jörg Landvoigt (GDR)	Yuriy Pimenov and Nikolay Pimenov (URS)	Charles Wiggin and Malcolm Carmichael (GBR)
1984 Los Angeles	Petru Iosub and Valer Toma (ROU)	Fernando Climent and Luis María Lasúrtegui (ESP)	Hans Magnus Grepperud and Sverre Løken (NOR)
1988 Seoul	Andy Holmes and Steve Redgrave (GBR)	Dănuț Dobre and Dragoș Neagu (ROU)	Sadik Mujkič and Bojan Prešern (YUG)
1992 Barcelona	Matthew Pinsent and Steve Redgrave (GBR)	Colin von Ettingshausen and Peter Hoeltzenbein (GER)	Iztok Čop and Denis Žvegelj (SLO)
1996 Atlanta	Matthew Pinsent and Steve Redgrave (GBR)	David Weightman and Rob Scott (AUS)	Michel Andrieux and J. C. Rolland (FRA)
2000 Sydney	Michel Andrieux and J. C. Rolland (FRA)	Ted Murphy and Sebastian Bea (USA)	Matthew Long and James Tomkins (AUS)
2004 Athens	Drew Ginn and James Tomkins (AUS)	Siniša Skelin and Nikša Skelin (CRO)	Donovan Cech and Ramon di Clemente (RSA)
2008 Beijing	Drew Ginn and Duncan Free (AUS)	David Calder and Scott Frandsen (CAN)	Nathan Twaddle and George Bridgewater (NZL)
2012 London	Eric Murray and Hamish Bond (NZL)	Germain Chardin and Dorian Mortelette (FRA)	George Nash and Will Satch (GBR)
2016 Rio de Janeiro	Eric Murray and Hamish Bond (NZL)	Lawrence Brittain and Shaun Keeling (RSA)	Marco Di Costanzo and Giovanni Abagnale (ITA)
2020 Tokyo	Martin Sinković and Valent Sinković (CRO)	Marius Cozmiuc and Ciprian Tudosă (ROU)	Frederic Vystavel and Joachim Sutton (DEN)
2024 Paris	Martin Sinković and Valent Sinković (CRO)	Thomas George and Oliver Wynne-Griffith (GBR)	Roman Röösli and Andrin Gulich (SUI)
2028 Los Angeles			

=== Coxless four ===
Games	Gold	Silver	Bronze
1904 St. Louis	United States; Arthur Stockhoff; August Erker; George Dietz; Albert Nasse	United States; Frederick Suerig; Martin Formanack; Charles Aman; Michael Begley	United States; Gus Voerg; John Freitag; Lou Heim; Frank Dummerth
1908 London	Great Britain; Collier Cudmore; James Angus Gillan; Duncan Mackinnon; John Somers-Smith	Great Britain; Philip Filleul; Harold Barker; John Fenning; Gordon Thomson	Canada; Gordon Balfour; Becher Gale; Charles Riddy; Geoffrey Taylor Netherlands; Hermannus Höfte; Albertus Wielsma; Johan Burk; Bernardus Croon
1912–1920	not included in the Olympic program		
1924 Paris	Great Britain; Maxwell Eley; James MacNabb; Robert Morrison; Terence Sanders	Canada; Archibald Black; George MacKay; Colin Finlayson (Note: The IOC medal database credits this medal to A. Mariacher. Also the official report shows Mariacher as competitor instead of Finlayson. However the National Olympic Committee of Canada shows only Finlayson as competitor, but not Mariacher.); William Wood	Switzerland; Émile Albrecht; Alfred Probst; Eugen Sigg; Hans Walter
1928 Amsterdam	Great Britain; John Lander; Michael Warriner; Richard Beesly; Edward Vaughan Bevan	United States; Charles Karle; William Miller; George Healis; Ernest Bayer	Italy; Cesare Rossi; Pietro Freschi; Umberto Bonadè; Paolo Gennari
1932 Los Angeles	Great Britain; John Badcock; Hugh Edwards; Jack Beresford; Rowland George	Germany; Karl Aletter; Ernst Gaber; Walter Flinsch; Hans Maier	Italy; Antonio Ghiardello; Francesco Cossu; Giliante D'Este; Antonio Garzoni Provenzani
1936 Berlin	Germany; Rudolf Eckstein; Anton Rom; Martin Karl; Wilhelm Menne	Great Britain; Martin Bristow; Alan Barrett; Peter Jackson; John Sturrock	Switzerland; Hermann Betschart; Hans Homberger; Alex Homberger; Karl Schmid
1948 London	Italy; Giuseppe Moioli; Elio Morille; Giovanni Invernizzi; Franco Faggi	Denmark; Helge Halkjær; Aksel Bonde; Helge Muxoll Schrøder; Ib Larsen	United States; Fred Kingsbury; Stu Griffing; Greg Gates; Robert Perew
1952 Helsinki	Yugoslavia; Duje Bonačić; Velimir Valenta; Mate Trojanović; Petar Šegvić	France; Pierre Blondiaux; Jean-Jacques Guissart; Marc Bouissou; Roger Gautier	Finland; Veikko Lommi; Kauko Wahlsten; Oiva Lommi; Lauri Nevalainen
1956 Melbourne	Canada; Archibald MacKinnon; Lorne Loomer; Walter D'Hondt; Donald Arnold	United States; John Welchli; John McKinlay; Art McKinlay; James McIntosh	France; René Guissart; Yves Delacour; Gaston Mercier; Guy Guillabert
1960 Rome	United States; Dan Ayrault; Ted Nash; John Sayre; Rusty Wailes	Italy; Tullio Baraglia; Renato Bosatta; Giancarlo Crosta; Giuseppe Galante	Soviet Union; Igor Akhremchik; Yuriy Bachurov; Valentin Morkovkin; Anatoly Tarabrin
1964 Tokyo	Denmark; John Hansen; Bjørn Hasløv; Erik Petersen; Kurt Helmudt	Great Britain; John Russell; Hugh Wardell-Yerburgh; William Barry; John James	United States; Geoffrey Picard; Dick Lyon; Ted Mittet; Ted Nash
1968 Mexico City	East Germany; Frank Forberger; Frank Rühle; Dieter Grahn; Dieter Schubert	Hungary; Zoltán Melis; József Csermely; György Sarlós; Antal Melis	Italy; Renato Bosatta; Pier Conti-Manzini; Tullio Baraglia; Abramo Albini
1972 Munich	East Germany; Frank Forberger; Frank Rühle; Dieter Grahn; Dieter Schubert	New Zealand; Dick Tonks; Dudley Storey; Ross Collinge; Noel Mills	West Germany; Joachim Ehrig; Peter Funnekötter; Franz Held; Wolfgang Plottke
1976 Montreal	East Germany; Siegfried Brietzke; Andreas Decker; Stefan Semmler; Wolfgang Mager	Norway; Ole Nafstad; Arne Bergodd; Finn Tveter; Rolf Andreassen	Soviet Union; Raul Arnemann; Nikolay Kuznetsov; Valeriy Dolinin; Anushavan Gassan-Dzhalalov
1980 Moscow	East Germany; Jürgen Thiele; Andreas Decker; Stefan Semmler; Siegfried Brietzke	Soviet Union; Aleksey Kamkin; Valeriy Dolinin; Aleksandr Kulagin; Vitali Eliseev	Great Britain; John Beattie; Ian McNuff; David Townsend; Martin Cross
1984 Los Angeles	New Zealand; Les O'Connell; Shane O'Brien; Conrad Robertson; Keith Trask	United States; David Clark; Jonathan Smith; Phillip Stekl; Alan Forney	Denmark; Michael Jessen; Lars Nielsen; Per Rasmussen; Erik Christiansen
1988 Seoul	East Germany; Roland Schröder; Ralf Brudel; Olaf Förster; Thomas Greiner	United States; Raoul Rodriguez; Thomas Bohrer; Richard Kennelly; David Krmpotich	West Germany; Guido Grabow; Volker Grabow; Norbert Keßlau; Jörg Puttlitz
1992 Barcelona	Australia; Andrew Cooper; Nicholas Green; Mike McKay; James Tomkins	United States; Jeffrey McLaughlin; William Burden; Thomas Bohrer; Patrick Manning	Slovenia; Milan Janša; Sadik Mujkič; Sašo Mirjanič; Janez Klemenčič
1996 Atlanta	Australia; Nicholas Green; Drew Ginn; James Tomkins; Mike McKay	France; Bertrand Vecten; Olivier Moncelet; Daniel Fauché; Gilles Bosquet	Great Britain; Greg Searle; Jonny Searle; Rupert Obholzer; Tim Foster
2000 Sydney	Great Britain; James Cracknell; Steve Redgrave; Tim Foster; Matthew Pinsent	Italy; Valter Molea; Riccardo Dei Rossi; Lorenzo Carboncini; Carlo Mornati	Australia; James Stewart; Ben Dodwell; Geoff Stewart; Bo Hanson
2004 Athens	Great Britain; Steve Williams; James Cracknell; Ed Coode; Matthew Pinsent	Canada; Cameron Baerg; Thomas Herschmiller; Jake Wetzel; Barney Williams	Italy; Lorenzo Porzio; Dario Dentale; Luca Agamennoni; Raffaello Leonardo
2008 Beijing	Great Britain; Tom James; Steve Williams; Pete Reed; Andrew Triggs Hodge	Australia; Matt Ryan; James Marburg; Cameron McKenzie-McHarg; Francis Hegerty	France; Julien Desprès; Benjamin Rondeau; Germain Chardin; Dorian Mortelette
2012 London	Great Britain; Alex Gregory; Tom James; Pete Reed; Andrew Triggs Hodge	Australia; James Chapman; Josh Dunkley-Smith; Drew Ginn; Will Lockwood	United States; Charlie Cole; Scott Gault; Glenn Ochal; Henrik Rummel
2016 Rio de Janeiro	Great Britain; Alex Gregory; Moe Sbihi; George Nash; Constantine Louloudis	Australia; Will Lockwood; Josh Dunkley-Smith; Josh Booth; Alexander Hill	Italy; Domenico Montrone; Matteo Castaldo; Matteo Lodo; Giuseppe Vicino
2020 Tokyo	Australia; Alexander Purnell; Spencer Turrin; Jack Hargreaves; Alexander Hill	Romania; Mihăiță Vasile Țigănescu; Mugurel Semciuc; Ștefan Constantin Berariu; Cosmin Pascari	Italy; Matteo Castaldo; Marco Di Costanzo; Matteo Lodo; Giuseppe Vicino; Bruno Rosetti (h)
2024 Paris	United States; Nick Mead; Justin Best; Michael Grady; Liam Corrigan	New Zealand; Oliver Maclean; Logan Ullrich; Tom Murray; Matt Macdonald	Great Britain; Oliver Wilkes; David Ambler; Matt Aldridge; Freddie Davidson
2028 Los Angeles			

=== Eight ===
Games	Gold	Silver	Bronze
1900 Paris	United States; William Carr; Harry DeBaecke; John Exley; John Geiger; Edwin Hedley; James Juvenal; Roscoe Lockwood; Edward Marsh; Louis Abell	Belgium; Jules De Bisschop; Prosper Bruggeman; Oscar Dessomville; Oscar De Cock; Maurice Hemelsoet; Marcel Van Crombrugge; Frank Odberg; Maurice Verdonck; Alfred Van Landeghem	Netherlands; François Brandt; Johannes van Dijk; Roelof Klein; Ruurd Leegstra; Walter Middelberg; Hendrik Offerhaus; Walter Thijssen; Henricus Tromp; Hermanus Brockmann
1904 St. Louis	United States; Frederick Cresser; Michael Gleason; Frank Schell; James Flanagan; Charles Armstrong; Harry Lott; Joseph Dempsey; John Exley; Louis Abell	Canada; Arthur Bailey; William Rice; George Reiffenstein; Phil Boyd; George Strange; William Wadsworth; Don MacKenzie; Joseph Wright; Thomas Loudon	none awarded
1908 London	Great Britain; Albert Gladstone; Frederick Kelly; Banner Johnstone; Guy Nickalls; Charles Burnell; Ronald Sanderson; Raymond Etherington-Smith; Henry Bucknall; Gilchrist Maclagan	Belgium; Oscar Taelman; Marcel Morimont; Rémy Orban; Georges Mys; François Vergucht; Polydore Veirman; Oscar Dessomville; Rodolphe Poma; Alfred Van Landeghem	Canada; Irvine Robertson; Joseph Wright; Julius Thomson; Walter Lewis; Gordon Balfour; Becher Gale; Charles Riddy; Geoffrey Taylor; Douglas Kertland
1908 London	Great Britain; Albert Gladstone; Frederick Kelly; Banner Johnstone; Guy Nickalls; Charles Burnell; Ronald Sanderson; Raymond Etherington-Smith; Henry Bucknall; Gilchrist Maclagan	Belgium; Oscar Taelman; Marcel Morimont; Rémy Orban; Georges Mys; François Vergucht; Polydore Veirman; Oscar Dessomville; Rodolphe Poma; Alfred Van Landeghem	Great Britain; Frank Jerwood; Eric Powell; Oswald Carver; Edward Williams; Henry Goldsmith; Harold Kitching; John Burn; Douglas Stuart; Richard Boyle
1912 Stockholm	Great Britain; Edgar Burgess; Sidney Swann; Leslie Wormald; Ewart Horsfall; James Angus Gillan; Stanley Garton; Alister Kirby; Philip Fleming; Henry Wells	Great Britain; William Fison; William Parker; Thomas Gillespie; Beaufort Burdekin; Frederick Pitman; Arthur Wiggins; Charles Littlejohn; Robert Bourne; John Walker	Germany; Otto Liebing; Max Bröske; Max Vetter; Willi Bartholomae; Fritz Bartholomae; Werner Dehn; Rudolf Reichelt; Hans Matthiae; Kurt Runge
1920 Antwerp	United States; Virgil Jacomini; Edwin Graves; William Jordan; Edward Moore; Alden Sanborn; Donald Johnston; Vince Gallagher; Clyde King; Sherm Clark	Great Britain; Ewart Horsfall; Guy Oliver Nickalls; Richard Lucas; Walter James; John Campbell; Sebastian Earl; Ralph Shove; Sidney Swann; Robin Johnstone	Norway; Theodor Nag; Conrad Olsen; Adolf Nilsen; Håkon Ellingsen; Thore Michelsen; Arne Mortensen; Karl Nag; Tollef Tollefsen; Thoralf Hagen
1924 Paris	United States; Leonard Carpenter; Howard Kingsbury; Alfred Lindley; John Miller; James Rockefeller; Frederick Sheffield; Benjamin Spock; Alfred Wilson; Laurence Stoddard	Canada; Arthur Bell; Robert Hunter; William Langford; Harold Little; John Smith; Warren Snyder; Norman Taylor; William Wallace; Ivor Campbell	Italy; Ante Katalinić; Frane Katalinić; Šimun Katalinić; Giuseppe Crivelli; Latino Galasso; Petar Ivanov; Bruno Sorić; Carlo Toniatti; Vittorio Gliubich
1928 Amsterdam	United States; Marvin Stalder; John Brinck; Francis Frederick; William Thompson; William Dally; James Workman; Hubert A. Caldwell; Peter Donlon; Donald Blessing	Great Britain; Jamie Hamilton; Guy Oliver Nickalls; John Badcock; Donald Gollan; Harold Lane; Gordon Killick; Jack Beresford; Harold West; Arthur Sulley	Canada; Frederick Hedges; Frank Fiddes; John Hand; Herbert Richardson; Jack Murdoch; Athol Meech; Edgar Norris; William Ross; John Donnelly
1932 Los Angeles	United States; Edwin Salisbury; James Blair; Duncan Gregg; David Dunlap; Burton Jastram; Charles Chandler; Harold Tower; Winslow Hall; Norris Graham	Italy; Vittorio Cioni; Mario Balleri; Renato Bracci; Dino Barsotti; Roberto Vestrini; Guglielmo Del Bimbo; Enrico Garzelli; Renato Barbieri; Cesare Milani	Canada; Earl Eastwood; Joseph Harris; Stanley Stanyar; Harry Fry; Cedric Liddell; William Thoburn; Don Boal; Albert Taylor; Les MacDonald
1936 Berlin	United States; Herbert Morris; Charles Day; Gordon Adam; John White; James McMillin; George Hunt; Joe Rantz; Donald Hume; Robert Moch	Italy; Guglielmo Del Bimbo; Dino Barsotti; Oreste Grossi; Enzo Bartolini; Mario Checcacci; Dante Secchi; Ottorino Quaglierini; Enrico Garzelli; Cesare Milani	Germany; Alfred Rieck; Helmut Radach; Hans Kuschke; Heinz Kaufmann; Gerd Völs; Werner Loeckle; Hans-Joachim Hannemann; Herbert Schmidt; Wilhelm Mahlow
1948 London	United States; Ian Turner; David Turner; James Hardy; George Ahlgren; Lloyd Butler; David Brown; Justus Smith; John Stack; Ralph Purchase	Great Britain; Christopher Barton; Michael Lapage; Guy Richardson; Paul Bircher; Paul Massey; Brian Lloyd; David Meyrick; Alfred Mellows; Jack Dearlove	Norway; Kristoffer Lepsøe; Thorstein Kråkenes; Hans Hansen; Halfdan Gran Olsen; Harald Kråkenes; Leif Næss; Thor Pedersen; Carl Monssen; Sigurd Monssen
1952 Helsinki	United States; Frank Shakespeare; William Fields; James Dunbar; Richard Murphy; Robert Detweiler; Henry Procter; Wayne Frye; Edward Stevens; Charles Manring	Soviet Union; Yevgeny Brago; Vladimir Rodimushkin; Aleksey Komarov; Igor Borisov; Slava Amiragov; Leonid Gissen; Yevgeny Samsonov; Vladimir Kryukov; Igor Polyakov	Australia; Bob Tinning; Ernest Chapman; Nimrod Greenwood; David Anderson; Geoff Williamson; Mervyn Finlay; Edward Pain; Phil Cayzer; Tom Chessell
1956 Melbourne	United States; Thomas Charlton; David Wight; John Cooke; Donald Beer; Caldwell Esselstyn; Charles Grimes; Rusty Wailes; Robert Morey; William Becklean	Canada; Philip Kueber; Richard McClure; Robert Wilson; David Helliwell; Wayne Pretty; Bill McKerlich; Douglas McDonald; Lawrence West; Carlton Ogawa	Australia; Michael Aikman; David Boykett; Angus Benfield; Jim Howden; Garth Manton; Walter Howell; Adrian Monger; Bryan Doyle; Harold Hewitt
1960 Rome	United Team of Germany; Manfred Rulffs; Walter Schröder; Frank Schepke; Kraft Schepke; Karl-Heinrich von Groddeck; Karl-Heinz Hopp; Klaus Bittner; Hans Lenk; Willi Padge	Canada; Donald Arnold; Walter D'Hondt; Nelson Kuhn; John Lecky; Lorne Loomer; Archibald MacKinnon; Bill McKerlich; Glen Mervyn; Sohen Biln	Czechoslovakia; Bohumil Janoušek; Jan Jindra; Jiří Lundák; Stanislav Lusk; Václav Pavkovič; Luděk Pojezný; Jan Švéda; Josef Věntus; Miroslav Koníček
1964 Tokyo	United States; Joseph Amlong; Thomas Amlong; Boyce Budd; Emory Clark; Stanley Cwiklinski; Hugh Foley; Bill Knecht; William Stowe; Róbert Zimonyi	United Team of Germany; Klaus Aeffke; Klaus Bittner; Karl-Heinrich von Groddeck; Hans-Jürgen Wallbrecht; Klaus Behrens; Jurgen Schroeder; Jürgen Plagemann; Horst Meyer; Thomas Ahrens	Czechoslovakia; Petr Čermák; Jiří Lundák; Jan Mrvík; Július Toček; Josef Věntus; Luděk Pojezný; Bohumil Janoušek; Richard Nový; Miroslav Koníček
1968 Mexico City	West Germany; Horst Meyer; Wolfgang Hottenrott; Dirk Schreyer; Egbert Hirschfelder; Rüdiger Henning; Jörg Siebert; Lutz Ulbricht; Niko Ott; Gunther Tiersch	Australia; Alf Duval; David Douglas; Michael Morgan; John Ranch; Joe Fazio; Gary Pearce; Peter Dickson; Bob Shirlaw; Alan Grover	Soviet Union; Zigmas Jukna; Aleksandr Martyshkin; Antanas Bagdonavičius; Vytautas Briedis; Volodymyr Sterlik; Valentyn Kravchuk; Juozas Jagelavičius; Viktor Suslin; Yuriy Lorentsson
1972 Munich	New Zealand; Tony Hurt; Wybo Veldman; Dick Joyce; John Hunter; Lindsay Wilson; Joe Earl; Trevor Coker; Gary Robertson; Simon Dickie	United States; Lawrence Terry; Franklin Hobbs; Pete Raymond; Tim Mickelson; Gene Clapp; Bill Hobbs; Cleve Livingston; Michael Livingston; Paul Hoffman	East Germany; Hans-Joachim Borzym; Jörg Landvoigt; Harold Dimke; Manfred Schneider; Hartmut Schreiber; Manfred Schmorde; Bernd Landvoigt; Heinrich Mederow; Dietmar Schwarz
1976 Montreal	East Germany; Bernd Baumgart; Gottfried Döhn; Werner Klatt; Hans-Joachim Lück; Dieter Wendisch; Roland Kostulski; Ulrich Karnatz; Karl-Heinz Prudöhl; Karl-Heinz Danielowski	Great Britain; Richard Lester; John Yallop; Timothy Crooks; Hugh Matheson; David Maxwell; Jim Clark; Fred Smallbone; Lenny Robertson; Patrick Sweeney	New Zealand; Ivan Sutherland; Trevor Coker; Peter Dignan; Lindsay Wilson; Joe Earl; Dave Rodger; Alec McLean; Tony Hurt; Simon Dickie
1980 Moscow	East Germany; Bernd Krauß; Hans-Peter Koppe; Ulrich Kons; Jörg Friedrich; Jens Doberschütz; Ulrich Karnatz; Uwe Dühring; Bernd Höing; Klaus-Dieter Ludwig	Great Britain; Duncan McDougall; Allan Whitwell; Henry Clay; Chris Mahoney; Andrew Justice; John Pritchard; Malcolm McGowan; Richard Stanhope; Colin Moynihan	Soviet Union; Viktor Kokoshyn; Andriy Tishchenko; Aleksandr Tkachenko; Jonas Pinskus; Jonas Narmontas; Andrey Luhin; Oleksandr Mantsevych; Ihar Maystrenka; Hryhoriy Dmytrenko
1984 Los Angeles	Canada; Blair Horn; Dean Crawford; J. Michael Evans; Paul Steele; Grant Main; Mark Evans; Kevin Neufeld; Pat Turner; Brian McMahon	United States; Chip Lubsen; Andrew Sudduth; John Terwilliger; Chris Penny; Tom Darling; Fred Borchelt; Charles Clapp; Bruce Ibbetson; Bob Jaugstetter	Australia; Craig Muller; Clyde Hefer; Samuel Patten; Tim Willoughby; Ian Edmunds; James Battersby; Ion Popa; Stephen Evans; Gavin Thredgold
1988 Seoul	West Germany; Bahne Rabe; Eckhardt Schultz; Ansgar Wessling; Wolfgang Maennig; Matthias Mellinghaus; Thomas Möllenkamp; Thomas Domian; Armin Eichholz; Manfred Klein	Soviet Union; Viktor Omelyanovich; Vasily Tikhonov; Andrey Vasilyev; Pavlo Hurkovskiy; Nikolay Kumarov; Aleksandr Lukvanov; Veniamin But; Viktor Diduk; Aleksandr Dumchev	United States; Mike Teti; Jonathan Smith; Ted Patton; Jack Rusher; Peter Nordell; Jeffrey McLaughlin; Doug Burden; John Pescatore; Seth Bauer
1992 Barcelona	Canada; Darren Barber; Andrew Crosby; Michael Forgeron; Robert Marland; Terrence Paul; Derek Porter; Michael Rascher; Bruce Robertson; John Wallace	Romania; Iulică Ruican; Viorel Talapan; Vasile Năstase; Gabriel Marin; Dănuț Dobre; Valentin Robu; Vasile Măstăcan; Ioan Vizitiu; Marin Gheorghe	Germany; Roland Baar; Armin Eichholz; Detlef Kirchhoff; Manfred Klein; Bahne Rabe; Frank Richter; Hans Sennewald; Thorsten Streppelhoff; Ansgar Wessling
1996 Atlanta	Netherlands; Koos Maasdijk; Ronald Florijn; Jeroen Duyster; Michiel Bartman; Henk-Jan Zwolle; Niels van der Zwan; Niels van Steenis; Diederik Simon; Nico Rienks	Germany; Mark Kleinschmidt; Detlef Kirchhoff; Wolfram Huhn; Roland Baar; Marc Weber; Ulrich Viefers; Peter Thiede; Thorsten Streppelhoff; Frank Richter	Russia; Pavel Melnikov; Andrey Glukhov; Anton Chermashentsev; Aleksandr Lukyanov; Nikolay Aksyonov; Dmitry Rozinkevich; Sergey Matveyev; Roman Monchenko; Vladimir Volodenkov; Vladimir Sokolov
2000 Sydney	Great Britain; Andrew Lindsay; Ben Hunt-Davis; Simon Dennis; Louis Attrill; Luka Grubor; Kieran West; Fred Scarlett; Steve Trapmore; Rowley Douglas	Australia; Christian Ryan; Alastair Gordon; Nick Porzig; Rob Jahrling; Mike McKay; Stuart Welch; Daniel Burke; Jaime Fernandez; Brett Hayman	Croatia; Igor Francetić; Tihomir Franković; Tomislav Smoljanović; Nikša Skelin; Siniša Skelin; Krešimir Čuljak; Igor Boraska; Branimir Vujević; Silvijo Petriško
2004 Athens	United States; Jason Read; Wyatt Allen; Chris Ahrens; Joseph Hansen; Matt Deakin; Dan Beery; Beau Hoopman; Bryan Volpenhein; Peter Cipollone	Netherlands; Matthijs Vellenga; Gijs Vermeulen; Jan-Willem Gabriëls; Daniël Mensch; Geert-Jan Derksen; Gerritjan Eggenkamp; Diederik Simon; Michiel Bartman; Chun Wei Cheung	Australia; Stefan Szczurowski; Stuart Reside; Stuart Welch; James Stewart; Geoff Stewart; Bo Hanson; Mike McKay; Stephen Stewart; Michael Toon
2008 Beijing	Canada; Kevin Light; Ben Rutledge; Andrew Byrnes; Jake Wetzel; Malcolm Howard; Dominic Seiterle; Adam Kreek; Kyle Hamilton; Brian Price	Great Britain; Alex Partridge; Tom Stallard; Tom Lucy; Richard Egington; Josh West; Alastair Heathcote; Matt Langridge; Colin Smith; Acer Nethercott	United States; Beau Hoopman; Matt Schnobrich; Micah Boyd; Wyatt Allen; Daniel Walsh; Steven Coppola; Josh Inman; Bryan Volpenhein; Marcus McElhenney
2012 London	Germany; Filip Adamski; Andreas Kuffner; Eric Johannesen; Maximilian Reinelt; Richard Schmidt; Lukas Müller; Florian Mennigen; Kristof Wilke; Martin Sauer	Canada; Gabriel Bergen; Douglas Csima; Robert Gibson; Conlin McCabe; Malcolm Howard; Andrew Byrnes; Jeremiah Brown; Will Crothers; Brian Price	Great Britain; Alex Partridge; James Foad; Tom Ransley; Richard Egington; Moe Sbihi; Greg Searle; Matt Langridge; Constantine Louloudis; Phelan Hill
2016 Rio de Janeiro	Great Britain; Paul Bennett; Scott Durant; Matt Gotrel; Matt Langridge; Tom Ransley; Pete Reed; Will Satch; Andrew Triggs Hodge; Phelan Hill	Germany; Maximilian Munski; Malte Jakschik; Andreas Kuffner; Eric Johannesen; Maximilian Reinelt; Felix Drahotta; Richard Schmidt; Hannes Ocik; Martin Sauer	Netherlands; Kaj Hendriks; Robert Lücken; Boaz Meylink; Boudewijn Röell; Olivier Siegelaar; Dirk Uittenbogaard; Mechiel Versluis; Tone Wieten; Peter Wiersum
2020 Tokyo	New Zealand; Tom Mackintosh; Hamish Bond; Tom Murray; Michael Brake; Dan Williamson; Phillip Wilson; Shaun Kirkham; Matt Macdonald; Sam Bosworth	Germany; Johannes Weißenfeld; Laurits Follert; Olaf Roggensack; Torben Johannesen; Jakob Schneider; Malte Jakschik; Richard Schmidt; Hannes Ocik; Martin Sauer	Great Britain; Josh Bugajski; Jacob Dawson; Thomas George; Moe Sbihi; Charles Elwes; Oliver Wynne-Griffith; James Rudkin; Thomas Ford; Henry Fieldman
2024 Paris	Great Britain; Morgan Bolding; Sholto Carnegie; Rory Gibbs; Thomas Ford; Jacob Dawson; Charles Elwes; Thomas Digby; James Rudkin; Harry Brightmore	Netherlands; Ralf Rienks; Olav Molenaar; Sander de Graaf; Ruben Knab; Gert-Jan van Doorn; Jacob van de Kerkhof; Jan van der Bij; Mick Makker; Dieuwke Fetter	United States; Henry Hollingsworth; Nicholas Rusher; Christian Tabash; Clark Dean; Christopher Carlson; Peter Chatain; Evan Olson; Pieter Quinton; Rielly Milne
2028 Los Angeles			

== Coming Soon ==
=== Coastal rowing ===
==== Single sculls ====
Games	Gold	Silver	Bronze
2028 Los Angeles			

== Discontinued events ==
=== Coxed pairs ===
Games	Gold	Silver	Bronze
1900 Paris	Netherlands; François Brandt; Roelof Klein; Hermanus Brockmann (Note: Brockmann was the coxswain for the Dutch team in the semifinal, but not in the final. He is considered a gold medallist by the IOC and is listed in that organization's medal database.) unknown boy (FRA) (Note: The unknown cox was hypothesized to be Giorgi Nikoladze of Georgia, but this hypothesis is not universally accepted (Histoire secrète du sport, François Thomazeau, La Découverte, 2019.).)	France; Lucien Martinet; René Waleff unknown cox	France; Carlos Deltour; Antoine Védrenne; Raoul Paoli
1904–1912	not included in the Olympic program		
1920 Antwerp	Italy; Ercole Olgeni; Giovanni Scatturin; Guido De Felip	France; Gabriel Poix; Maurice Monney-Bouton; Ernest Barberolle	Switzerland; Édouard Candeveau; Alfred Felber; Paul Piaget
1924 Paris	Switzerland; Édouard Candeveau; Alfred Felber; Émile Lachapelle	Italy; Ercole Olgeni; Giovanni Scatturin; Gino Sopracordevole	United States; Leon Butler; Harold Wilson; Edward Jennings
1928 Amsterdam	Switzerland; Hans Schöchlin; Karl Schöchlin; Hans Bourquin	France; Armand Marcelle; Edouard Marcelle; Henri Préaux	Belgium; Léon Flament; François de Coninck; Georges Anthony
1932 Los Angeles	United States; Joseph Schauers; Charles Kieffer; Edward Jennings	Poland; Jerzy Braun; Janusz Ślązak; Jerzy Skolimowski	France; Anselme Brusa; André Giriat; Pierre Brunet
1936 Berlin	Germany; Gerhard Gustmann; Herbert Adamski; Dieter Arend	Italy; Almiro Bergamo; Guido Santin; Luciano Negrini	France; Marceau Fourcade; Georges Tapie; Noël Vandernotte
1948 London	Denmark; Finn Pedersen; Tage Henriksen; Carl Andersen	Italy; Giovanni Steffè; Aldo Tarlao; Alberto Radi	Hungary; Antal Szendey; Béla Zsitnik; Róbert Zimonyi
1952 Helsinki	France; Raymond Salles; Gaston Mercier; Bernard Malivoire	Germany; Heinz Manchen; Helmut Heinhold; Helmut Noll	Denmark; Svend Petersen; Poul Svendsen; Jørgen Frantzen
1956 Melbourne	United States; Dan Ayrault; Conn Findlay; Kurt Seiffert	United Team of Germany; Karl-Heinrich von Groddeck; Horst Arndt; Rainer Borkowsky	Soviet Union; Ihor Yemchuk; Heorhiy Zhylin; Vladimir Petrov
1960 Rome	United Team of Germany; Bernhard Knubel; Heinz Renneberg; Klaus Zerta	Soviet Union; Antanas Bagdonavičius; Zigmas Jukna; Igor Rudakov	United States; Richard Draeger; Conn Findlay; Kent Mitchell
1964 Tokyo	United States; Edward Ferry; Conn Findlay; Kent Mitchell	France; Jacques Morel; Georges Morel; Jean-Claude Darouy	Netherlands; Jan Just Bos; Herman Rouwé; Erik Hartsuiker
1968 Mexico City	Italy; Primo Baran; Renzo Sambo; Bruno Cipolla	Netherlands; Herman Suselbeek; Hadriaan van Nes; Roderick Rijnders	Denmark; Jørn Krab; Harry Jørgensen; Preben Krab
1972 Munich	East Germany; Wolfgang Gunkel; Jörg Lucke; Klaus-Dieter Neubert	Czechoslovakia; Oldřich Svojanovský; Pavel Svojanovský; Vladimír Petříček	Romania; Ştefan Tudor; Petre Ceapura; Ladislau Lovrenschi
1976 Montreal	East Germany; Harald Jährling; Friedrich Ulrich; Georg Spohr	Soviet Union; Dmitry Bekhterev; Yuri Shurkalov; Yuriy Lorentsson	Czechoslovakia; Oldřich Svojanovský; Pavel Svojanovský; Ludvík Vébr
1980 Moscow	East Germany; Harald Jährling; Friedrich-Wilhelm Ulrich; Georg Spohr	Soviet Union; Viktor Pereverzev; Gennadi Kryuçkin; Aleksandr Lukyanov	Yugoslavia; Duško Mrduljaš; Zlatko Celent; Josip Reić
1984 Los Angeles	Italy; Carmine Abbagnale; Giuseppe Abbagnale; Giuseppe Di Capua	Romania; Dimitrie Popescu; Vasile Tomoiagă; Dumitru Răducanu	United States; Kevin Still; Robert Espeseth; Doug Herland
1988 Seoul	Italy; Carmine Abbagnale; Giuseppe Abbagnale; Giuseppe Di Capua	East Germany; Mario Streit; Detlef Kirchhoff; René Rensch	Great Britain; Patrick Sweeney; Andy Holmes; Steve Redgrave
1992 Barcelona	Great Britain; Garry Herbert; Greg Searle; Jonny Searle	Italy; Carmine Abbagnale; Giuseppe Abbagnale; Giuseppe Di Capua	Romania; Dimitrie Popescu; Dumitru Răducanu; Nicolae Țaga

=== Coxed four ===
Games	Gold	Silver	Bronze
1900 Paris	France; Henri Bouckaert; Jean Cau; Émile Delchambre; Henri Hazebrouck; Charlot	France; Georges Lumpp; Charles Perrin; Daniel Soubeyran; Émile Wegelin unknown cox	Germany; Wilhelm Carstens; Julius Körner; Adolf Möller; Hugo Rüster; Gustav Moths (Note: The German team changed the coxswain after the semi-final. Gustav Moths participated only in the semi-final and Max Ammermann participated in the final. However, the IOC medal database credits the gold medal only to Gustav Moths.); Max Ammermann
1900 Paris	Germany; Gustav Goßler; Oscar Goßler; Walther Katzenstein; Waldemar Tietgens; Carl Goßler	Netherlands; Coenraad Hiebendaal; Geert Lotsij; Paul Lotsij; Johannes Terwogt; Hermanus Brockmann	Germany; Ernst Felle; Otto Fickeisen; Carl Lehle; Hermann Wilker; Franz Kröwerath
1904–1908	not included in the Olympic program		
1912 Stockholm	Germany; Albert Arnheiter; Hermann Wilker; Rudolf Fickeisen; Otto Fickeisen; Karl Leister (Note: The German team changed the cox after the first round. But it is not known, if Otto Maier participated in the first round and Karl Leister did the rest of the tournament or Karl Leister participated in the first round and Otto Maier did the rest. However, the IOC medal database credits the gold medal only to Karl Leister.)	Great Britain; Julius Beresford; Karl Vernon; Charles Rought; Bruce Logan; Geoffrey Carr	Denmark; Erik Bisgaard; Rasmus Frandsen; Mikael Simonsen; Poul Thymann; Ejgil Clemmensen
1920 Antwerp	Switzerland; Willy Brüderlin; Max Rudolf; Paul Rudolf; Hans Walter; Paul Staub	United States; Ken Myers; Carl Klose; Franz Federschmidt; Erich Federschmidt; Sherm Clark	Norway; Birger Var; Theodor Klem; Henry Larsen; Per Gulbrandsen; Thoralf Hagen
1924 Paris	Switzerland; Émile Albrecht; Alfred Probst; Eugen Sigg; Hans Walter; Émile Lachapelle	France; Eugène Constant; Louis Gressier; Georges Lecointe; Raymond Talleux; Marcel Lepan	United States; Bob Gerhardt; Sid Jelinek; Ed Mitchell; Henry Welsford; John Kennedy
1928 Amsterdam	Italy; Valerio Perentin; Giliante D'Este; Nicolò Vittori; Giovanni Delise; Renato Petronio	Switzerland; Ernst Haas; Joseph Meyer; Otto Bucher; Karl Schwegler; Fritz Bösch	Poland; Franciszek Bronikowski; Edmund Jankowski; Leon Birkholc; Bernard Ormanowski; Bolesław Drewek
1932 Los Angeles	Germany; Hans Eller; Horst Hoeck; Walter Meyer; Joachim Spremberg; Carlheinz Neumann	Italy; Bruno Vattovaz; Giovanni Plazzer; Riccardo Divora; Bruno Parovel; Guerrino Scher	Poland; Jerzy Braun; Janusz Ślązak; Stanisław Urban; Edward Kobyliński; Jerzy Skolimowski
1936 Berlin	Germany; Hans Maier; Walter Volle; Ernst Gaber; Paul Söllner; Fritz Bauer	Switzerland; Hermann Betschart; Hans Homberger; Alex Homberger; Karl Schmid; Rolf Spring	France; Fernand Vandernotte; Marcel Vandernotte; Jean Cosmat; Marcel Chauvigné; Noël Vandernotte
1948 London	United States; Warren Westlund; Bob Martin; Bob Will; Gordy Giovanelli; Allen Morgan	Switzerland; Rudolf Reichling; Erich Schriever; Émile Knecht; Peter Stebler; André Moccand	Denmark; Erik Larsen; Børge Nielsen; Henry Larsen; Harry Knudsen; Jørgen Olsen
1952 Helsinki	Czechoslovakia; Karel Mejta; Jiří Havlis; Jan Jindra; Stanislav Lusk; Miroslav Koranda	Switzerland; Rico Bianchi; Karl Weidmann; Heini Scheller; Émile Ess; Walter Leiser	United States; Carl Lovsted; Al Ulbrickson; Richard Wahlstrom; Matt Leanderson; Al Rossi
1956 Melbourne	Italy; Alberto Winkler; Romano Sgheiz; Angelo Vanzin; Franco Trincavelli; Ivo Stefanoni	Sweden; Olle Larsson; Gösta Eriksson; Ivar Aronsson; Evert Gunnarsson; Bertil Göransson	Finland; Kauko Hänninen; Reino Poutanen; Veli Lehtelä; Toimi Pitkänen; Matti Niemi
1960 Rome	United Team of Germany; Gerd Cintl; Horst Effertz; Klaus Riekemann; Jürgen Litz; Michael Obst	France; Robert Dumontois; Claude Martin; Jacques Morel; Guy Nosbaum; Jean Klein	Italy; Fulvio Balatti; Romano Sgheiz; Franco Trincavelli; Giovanni Zucchi; Ivo Stefanoni
1964 Tokyo	United Team of Germany; Peter Neusel; Bernhard Britting; Joachim Werner; Egbert Hirschfelder; Jürgen Oelke	Italy; Renato Bosatta; Emilio Trivini; Giuseppe Galante; Franco De Pedrina; Giovanni Spinola	Netherlands; Lex Mullink; Jan van de Graaff; Freek van de Graaff; Robert van de Graaff; Marius Klumperbeek
1968 Mexico City	New Zealand; Dick Joyce; Ross Collinge; Dudley Storey; Warren Cole; Simon Dickie	East Germany; Peter Kremtz; Manfred Gelpke; Roland Göhler; Klaus Jacob; Dieter Semetzky	Switzerland; Denis Oswald; Peter Bolliger; Hugo Waser; Jakob Grob; Gottlieb Fröhlich
1972 Munich	West Germany; Peter Berger; Hans-Johann Färber; Gerhard Auer; Alois Bierl; Uwe Benter	East Germany; Dietrich Zander; Reinhard Gust; Eckhard Martens; Rolf Jobst; Klaus-Dieter Ludwig	Czechoslovakia; Otakar Mareček; Karel Neffe; Vladimír Jánoš; František Provazník; Vladimír Petříček
1976 Montreal	Soviet Union; Vladimir Eshinov; Nikolay Ivanov; Mikhail Kuznetsov; Aleksandr Klepikov; Aleksandr Lukyanov	East Germany; Andreas Schulz; Rüdiger Kunze; Walter Dießner; Ullrich Dießner; Johannes Thomas	West Germany; Hans-Johann Färber; Ralph Kubail; Siegfried Fricke; Peter Niehusen; Hartmut Wenzel
1980 Moscow	East Germany; Dieter Wendisch; Ullrich Dießner; Walter Dießner; Gottfried Döhn; Andreas Gregor	Soviet Union; Artūrs Garonskis; Dimants Krišjānis; Dzintars Krišjānis; Žoržs Tikmers; Juris Bērziņš	Poland; Grzegorz Stellak; Adam Tomasiak; Grzegorz Nowak; Ryszard Stadniuk; Ryszard Kubiak
1984 Los Angeles	Great Britain; Martin Cross; Richard Budgett; Andy Holmes; Steve Redgrave; Adrian Ellison	United States; Edward Ives; Thomas Kiefer; Michael Bach; Gregory Springer; John Stillings	New Zealand; Brett Hollister; Kevin Lawton; Barrie Mabbott; Don Symon; Ross Tong
1988 Seoul	East Germany; Bernd Niesecke; Hendrik Reiher; Karsten Schmeling; Bernd Eichwurzel; Frank Klawonn	Romania; Dimitrie Popescu; Ioan Snep; Vasile Tomoiagă; Ladislau Lovrenschi; Valentin Robu	New Zealand; Chris White; Ian Wright; Andrew Bird; Greg Johnston; George Keys
1992 Barcelona	Romania; Iulică Ruican; Viorel Talapan; Dimitrie Popescu; Dumitru Răducanu; Nicolae Țaga	Germany; Ralf Brudel; Uwe Kellner; Thoralf Peters; Karsten Finger; Hendrik Reiher	Poland; Wojciech Jankowski; Maciej Łasicki; Jacek Streich; Tomasz Tomiak; Michał Cieślak

=== Coxed four, inriggers ===
Games	Gold	Silver	Bronze
1912 Stockholm	Denmark; Ejler Allert; Christian Hansen; Carl Møller; Carl Pedersen; Poul Hartmann	Sweden; Ture Rosvall; William Bruhn-Möller; Conrad Brunkman; Herman Dahlbäck; Leo Wilkens	Norway; Claus Høyer; Reidar Holter; Max Herseth; Frithjof Olstad; Olav Bjørnstad

=== Lightweight double sculls ===
Games	Gold	Silver	Bronze
1996 Atlanta	Michael Gier and Markus Gier (SUI)	Maarten van der Linden and Pepijn Aardewijn (NED)	Bruce Hick and Anthony Edwards (AUS)
2000 Sydney	Tomasz Kucharski and Robert Sycz (POL)	Elia Luini and Leonardo Pettinari (ITA)	Pascal Touron and Thibaud Chapelle (FRA)
2004 Athens	Tomasz Kucharski and Robert Sycz (POL)	Frédéric Dufour and Pascal Touron (FRA)	Vasileios Polymeros and Nikolaos Skiathitis (GRE)
2008 Beijing	Zac Purchase and Mark Hunter (GBR)	Dimitrios Mougios and Vasileios Polymeros (GRE)	Mads Rasmussen and Rasmus Quist Hansen (DEN)
2012 London	Mads Rasmussen and Rasmus Quist Hansen (DEN)	Zac Purchase and Mark Hunter (GBR)	Storm Uru and Peter Taylor (NZL)
2016 Rio de Janeiro	Pierre Houin and Jérémie Azou (FRA)	Gary O'Donovan and Paul O'Donovan (IRL)	Kristoffer Brun and Are Strandli (NOR)
2020 Tokyo	Fintan McCarthy and Paul O'Donovan (IRL)	Jonathan Rommelmann and Jason Osborne (GER)	Stefano Oppo and Pietro Ruta (ITA)
2024 Paris	Fintan McCarthy and Paul O'Donovan (IRL)	Stefano Oppo and Gabriel Soares (ITA)	Petros Gkaidatzis and Antonios Papakonstantinou (GRE)

=== Lightweight coxless four ===
Games	Gold	Silver	Bronze
1996 Atlanta	Denmark; Victor Feddersen; Niels Henriksen; Thomas Poulsen; Eskild Ebbesen	Canada; Brian Peaker; Jeffrey Lay; Dave Boyes; Gavin Hassett	United States; Marc Schneider; Jeff Pfaendtner; David Collins; William Carlucci
2000 Sydney	France; Laurent Porchier; Jean-Christophe Bette; Yves Hocdé; Xavier Dorfman	Australia; Simon Burgess; Anthony Edwards; Darren Balmforth; Robert Richards	Denmark; Søren Madsen; Thomas Ebert; Eskild Ebbesen; Victor Feddersen
2004 Athens	Denmark; Thor Kristensen; Thomas Ebert; Stephan Mølvig; Eskild Ebbesen	Australia; Glen Loftus; Anthony Edwards; Ben Cureton; Simon Burgess	Italy; Lorenzo Bertini; Catello Amarante; Salvatore Amitrano; Bruno Mascarenhas
2008 Beijing	Denmark; Thomas Ebert; Morten Jørgensen; Eskild Ebbesen; Mads Andersen	Poland; Łukasz Pawłowski; Bartłomiej Pawełczak; Miłosz Bernatajtys; Paweł Rańda	Canada; Iain Brambell; Jon Beare; Mike Lewis; Liam Parsons
2012 London	South Africa; James Thompson; Matthew Brittain; John Smith; Sizwe Ndlovu	Great Britain; Peter Chambers; Rob Williams; Richard Chambers; Chris Bartley	Denmark; Kasper Winther Jørgensen; Morten Jørgensen; Jacob Barsøe; Eskild Ebbesen
2016 Rio de Janeiro	Switzerland; Lucas Tramèr; Simon Schürch; Simon Niepmann; Mario Gyr	Denmark; Jacob Barsøe; Jacob Larsen; Kasper Winther Jørgensen; Morten Jørgensen	France; Franck Solforosi; Thomas Baroukh; Guillaume Raineau; Thibault Colard

== See also ==
- Rowing at the 1906 Intercalated Games are no longer regarded as official Games by the International Olympic Committee
- List of Asian Games medalists in rowing
