= Rowing at the 1904 Summer Olympics =

Rowing at the Games of the III Olympiad
- Venue: St. Louis
- Dates: July 30, 1904
- Competitors: 44 from 2 nations

At the 1904 Summer Olympics, five rowing events were contested. All competitions were held on Saturday, July 30.

It was the second appearance of the sport in Olympic competition. Coxless forms of the pairs and fours were introduced, replacing the coxed pairs and fours that had been used four years earlier. Sculling was expanded, with double sculls as well as singles.

== Medal summary ==
Event	Gold	Silver	Bronze
Single sculls	Frank Greer; United States	James Juvenal; United States	Constance Titus; United States
Double sculls	John Mulcahy and William Varley; United States	Joseph McLoughlin and John Hoben; United States	Joseph Ravannack and John Wells; United States
Coxless pair	Robert Farnan and Joseph Ryan; United States	John Mulcahy and William Varley; United States	John Joachim and Joseph Buerger; United States
Coxless four	United States; Arthur Stockhoff; August Erker; George Dietz; Albert Nasse	United States; Frederick Suerig; Martin Formanack; Charles Aman; Michael Begley	United States; Gus Voerg; John Freitag; Lou Heim; Frank Dummerth
Eight	United States; Frederick Cresser; Michael Gleason; Frank Schell; James Flanagan; Charles Armstrong; Harry Lott; Joseph Dempsey; John Exley; Louis Abell	Canada; Arthur Bailey; William Rice; George Reiffenstein; Phil Boyd; George Strange; William Wadsworth; Don MacKenzie; Joseph Wright; Thomas Loudon	none awarded

== Participating nations ==
A total of 44 rowers from two nations competed at the St. Louis Games:

- Canada (9)
- United States (35)

== Medal table ==
Only one of the 44 rowers who competed, Divie Duffield, did not win a medal. Duffield finished fourth in the single sculls event.

Rank	Nation	Gold	Silver	Bronze	Total
1	United States	5	4	4	13
2	Canada	0	1	0	1
Totals (2 entries)		5	5	4	14
