= Hans Maier (rower) =

German rower (1909–1943)

Personal information
- Born: Johann Adolf Friedrich Maier; 13 June 1909 Mannheim, German Empire
- Died: 6 March 1943 (aged 33) Mareth, Tunisia

Sport
- Sport: Rowing
- Club: MRV Amicitia
Medal record
Men's rowing
Representing Nazi Germany
Olympic Games
Gold medal – first place	1936 Berlin	Coxed four
Silver medal – second place	1932 Los Angeles	Coxless four

Johann Adolf Friedrich Maier (13 June 1909 – 6 March 1943) was a German rower who competed in three Olympic Games from 1928 to 1936. In Los Angeles, he won a silver medal, along with Karl Aletter, Walter Flinsch and Ernst Gaber in the coxless four. In Berlin, he won a gold medal, along with Paul Söllner, Walter Volle, Fritz Bauer and Ernst Gaber in the coxed four. He was killed during World War II while serving in North Africa. Gustav Maier was his elder brother with whom he had competed in the 1928 Olympics.
