= Bricio =

Bricio is a surname. Notable people with the surname include:

- Carlos Pérez de Bricio (1927–2022), Spanish politician and businessman
- Francisco de Bricio (1890–1978), Brazilian rower
- Leonardo Brício (born 1963), Brazilian actor and theater director
- Samantha Bricio (born 1994), Mexican volleyball player
