= George Mattson =

George Mattson may refer to:

- George Mattson (martial artist), American karate practitioner
- George Mattson (rower) (1908-1997), American Olympic rower
- George Mattson (synthesizer inventor) (born 1954), American inventor

== See also ==
- George Matson (1817–1898), Australian cricketer
