= Michael Gleason =

Michael or Mike Gleason may refer to:

- Michael Gleason (rower) (1876–1923), American rower
- Michael Gleason (musician), American musician, singer and songwriter
- Mike Gleason (announcer), ESPN anchor
- Mike Gleason (politician), member of the Arizona House of Representatives

== See also ==
- Michael Gleeson (disambiguation)
