= Aletter =

Aletter is a surname. Notable people with the surname include:

- Frank Aletter (1926–2009), American actor
- Karl Aletter (1906–1991), German rower
