= Rowing at the 1904 Summer Olympics – Men's coxless pair =

Men's coxless pairs at the Games of the III Olympiad
- Venue: Creve Coeur Lake
- Date: July 30, 1904
- Competitors: 6 from 1 nation

Medalists
1st place, gold medalist(s)		Robert Farnan, Joseph Ryan; United States
2nd place, silver medalist(s)		John Mulcahy, William Varley; United States
3rd place, bronze medalist(s)		Joseph Buerger, John Joachim; United States

The men's coxless pairs was a rowing event held as part of the rowing programme at the 1904 Summer Olympics. It was the first time the event was held at the Olympics. The competition was held on Saturday, July 30, 1904. Three American crews with six rowers competed.

== Results ==
Final
1	Robert Farnan and Joseph Ryan (USA)	10:57.0
2	John Mulcahy and William Varley (USA)	
3	John Joachim and Joseph Buerger (USA)	

== Sources ==
- Wudarski, Pawel (1999). "Wyniki Igrzysk Olimpijskich" (in Polish).
