= Rowing at the 1904 Summer Olympics – Men's double sculls =

Men's double sculls at the Games of the III Olympiad
- Venue: Creve Coeur Lake
- Date: July 30, 1904
- Competitors: 6 from 1 nation

Medalists
| 1st place, gold medalist(s) | | John Mulcahy, William Varley; United States |
| 2nd place, silver medalist(s) | | John Hoben, Joseph McLoughlin; United States |
| 3rd place, bronze medalist(s) | | Joseph Ravannack, John Wells; United States |

The men's double sculls was a rowing event held as part of the rowing programme at the 1904 Summer Olympics. It was the first time the event was held at the Olympics. The competition was held on Saturday, July 30, 1904. Three American crews competed.

== Results ==
Final
| 1 | John Mulcahy and William Varley (USA) | 10:03.2 |
| 2 | Joseph McLoughlin and John Hoben (USA) | |
| 3 | Joseph Ravannack and John Wells (USA) | |

== Sources ==
- Wudarski, Pawel (1999). "Wyniki Igrzysk Olimpijskich" (in Polish).
