= Joseph Ryan (rower) =

American rower (1879–1972)

Medal record

Men's rowing

Representing the United States

Olympic Games
Gold medal – first place	1904 St. Louis	Coxless pairs

Joseph Ryan (November 23, 1879 – April 30, 1972) was an American from Brockton, Massachusetts rower. He won an Olympic gold medal in the coxless pairs at the 1904 Summer Olympics, together with Robert Farnan.
