= Thomas Pierie =

American rower

Personal information
- Born: May 12, 1907 Wyncote, Pennsylvania, U.S.
- Died: January 26, 1978 (aged 70) Nashua, New Hampshire, U.S.

Sport
- Sport: Rowing

Thomas Pierie (May 12, 1907 – January 26, 1978) was an American rower. He competed in the men's coxless four event at the 1932 Summer Olympics.
