= Fraser Herman =

Canadian rower

Personal information
- Born: 23 January 1908; East LaHave, Nova Scotia, Canada
- Died: 2 October 1972 (aged 64); Halifax, Nova Scotia, Canada

Sport
- Sport: Rowing

Fraser Herman (23 January 1908 – 2 October 1972) was a Canadian rower. He competed in the men's coxless four event at the 1932 Summer Olympics.
