= John Wells (rower) =

American rower

Olympic medal record

Men's rowing

Representing the United States
Bronze medal – third place	1904 St. Louis	Double sculls

John Wells (1859 – April 18, 1929) was an American rower who competed in the 1904 Summer Olympics. In 1904, he won the bronze medal in the double sculls with his partner Joseph Ravannack.
