= Rowing at the 1904 Summer Olympics – Men's eight =

Men's eight at the Games of the III Olympiad
- Rowing pictogram
- Venue: Creve Coeur Lake
- Date: July 30
- Competitors: 18 from 2 nations
- Winning time: 7:50.0

Medalists
1st place, gold medalist(s)		United States: Charles Armstrong; Frederick Cresser; Joseph Dempsey; John Exley; James Flanagan; Michael Gleason; Harry Lott; Frank Schell; Louis Abell (cox)
2nd place, silver medalist(s)		Canada: Alan Bailey; Phil Boyd; Don MacKenzie; George Reiffenstein; John Rice; George Strange; William Wadsworth; Joseph Wright; Thomas Loudon (cox)

The men's eight was a rowing event held as part of the rowing programme at the 1904 Summer Olympics. It was the second time the event was held at the Olympics. The competition was held on Saturday, July 30, 1904. Two crews, one from the United States and one from Canada, competed. The American team won, successfully defending their Olympic title from 1900.

== Background ==
This was the second appearance of the event. Rowing had been on the programme in 1896 but was cancelled due to bad weather. The men's eight has been held every time that rowing has been contested, beginning in 1900.

As in 1900, the United States was represented by the Vesper Boat Club of Philadelphia. Two members of the team that won a gold medal in Paris returned: coxswain Louis Abell and stroke John Exley. Their only opponent in St. Louis was the Canadian team, from the Toronto Argonaut Rowing Club.

It was Canada's debut in the event. The United States was the only nation to have competed in both editions so far.

== Competition format ==
The "eight" event featured nine-person boats, with eight rowers and a coxswain. It was a sweep rowing event, with the rowers each having one oar (and thus each rowing on one side). The distance for the race was 2 miles (3218 metres), rather than the 2000 metres which was becoming standard even at the time (and has been used in the Olympics since 1912, except in 1948). It was by far the longest distance used in the Games, over the 1.5 mile (2412 metres) course in London in 1908.

With only two boats, the competition consisted of a single race.

== Schedule ==
Date	Time	Round
Saturday, 30 July 1904	17:30	Final

== Results ==
The American team won the race by three lengths.

Rank	Rowers	Coxswain	Nation	Time
1st place, gold medalist(s)	Frederick Cresser; Michael Gleason; Frank Schell; James Flanagan; Charles Armstrong; Harry Lott; Joseph Dempsey; John Exley	Louis Abell	United States	7:50.0
2nd place, silver medalist(s)	Alan Bailey; John Rice; George Reiffenstein; Phil Boyd; George Strange; William Wadsworth; Don MacKenzie; Joseph Wright	Thomas Loudon	Canada	7:58.4e

== Sources ==
- Wudarski, Pawel (1999). "Wyniki Igrzysk Olimpijskich" (in Polish).
