= Rowing at the 1904 Summer Olympics – Men's coxless four =

Men's coxless fours at the Games of the III Olympiad
- Venue: Creve Coeur Lake
- Date: July 30, 1904
- Competitors: 12 from 1 nation

Medalists
1st place, gold medalist(s)		United States; August Erker, George Dietz, Albert Nasse, Arthur Stockhoff
2nd place, silver medalist(s)		United States; Charles Aman, Michael Begley, Martin Formanack, Frederick Suerig
3rd place, bronze medalist(s)		United States; Frank Dummerth, John Freitag, Lou Heim, Gus Voerg

The men's coxless fours was a rowing event held as part of the rowing programme at the 1904 Summer Olympics. It was the first time the event was held at the Olympics. The competition was held on Saturday, July 30, 1904. Three American crews competed.

== Results ==
Final
1	Arthur Stockhoff, August Erker, George Dietz, and Albert Nasse (USA)	9:05.8
2	Frederick Suerig, Martin Formanack, Charles Aman, and Michael Begley (USA)	9:37.6
3	Gus Voerg, John Freitag, Lou Heim, and Frank Dummerth (USA)	10:02.4

== Sources ==
- Wudarski, Pawel (1999). "Wyniki Igrzysk Olimpijskich" (in Polish).
