= Joseph Schauers =

American rower (1909–1987)

Medal record

Men's rowing

Representing the United States

Olympic Games
Gold medal – first place	1932 Los Angeles	Coxed pair

Joseph Anthony Schauers (May 27, 1909 – October 18, 1987) was an American rower who competed in the 1932 Summer Olympics.

In 1932 he won the gold medal as member of the American boat in the coxed pairs competition.
