= Michael Gleeson =

Michael Gleeson may refer to:

- Michael Gleeson (hurler) (born 1955), Irish hurling player
- Michael Gleeson (politician) (born 1946), Irish politician and former GAA football player
- Mike Gleeson, a character on the Irish soap opera Fair City

== See also ==
- Michael Gleason (disambiguation)
