= Charles Kieffer =

American rower (1910–1975)

Medal record

Men's rowing

Representing the United States

Olympic Games
Gold medal – first place	1932 Los Angeles	Coxed pair

Charles M. "Charlie" Kieffer (August 11, 1910 – November 8, 1975) was an American rower. He won the Olympic gold medal in crew at the 1932 Summer Olympics in Los Angeles. He was a graduate of La Salle University.
