= Edgar Johnson (rower) =

American rower

Personal information
- Born: December 12, 1905 Philadelphia, Pennsylvania, United States
- Died: January 19, 1977 (aged 71) Philadelphia, Pennsylvania, United States

Sport
- Sport: Rowing

Edgar Johnson (December 12, 1905 – January 19, 1977) was an American rower. He competed in the men's coxless four event at the 1932 Summer Olympics.
