= Russell Gammon =

Canadian rower

Personal information
- Born: 6 May 1906; Dartmouth, Nova Scotia, Canada
- Died: 22 August 1968 (aged 62); Pawtucket, Rhode Island, United States

Sport
- Sport: Rowing

Russell Gammon (6 May 1906 – 22 August 1968) was a Canadian rower. He competed in the men's coxless four event at the 1932 Summer Olympics.
