= Henry Pelham (rower) =

Canadian rower

Medal record

Men's Rowing

British Empire Games
Silver medal – second place	1930 Hamilton	Coxless fours

Henry Joseph Pelham (March 2, 1908 – March 17, 1978) was a Canadian rower who competed in the 1932 Summer Olympics.

In 1932 he was a crew member of the Canadian boat which was eliminated in the repêchage of the coxless fours event.

At the 1930 Empire Games he won the silver medal with the Canadian boat in the coxless fours competition.
