= John McCosker (rower) =

American rower

Personal information
- Born: October 10, 1910 Philadelphia, Pennsylvania, United States
- Died: August 7, 1965 (aged 54) Springfield, Delaware, Pennsylvania, United States

Sport
- Sport: Rowing

John McCosker (October 10, 1910 – August 7, 1965) was an American rower. He competed in the men's coxless four event at the 1932 Summer Olympics.
