= Pierre Brunet (rowing) =

French rower (1908–1979)

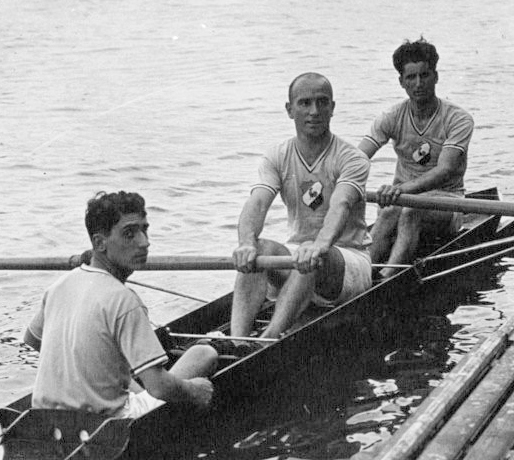
- Brunet (left), Giriat, Brusa at the 1931 European Championships

Personal information
- Born: 27 February 1908 Lyon, France
- Died: 12 May 1979 (aged 71) Lyon, France

Sport
- Sport: Rowing
- Club: Cercle de l'Aviron de Lyon, Lyon
Medal record
Representing France
Olympic Games
Bronze medal – third place	1932 Los Angeles	Coxed pair
European Rowing Championships
Gold medal – first place	1931 Paris	Coxed pair

Pierre André Brunet (27 February 1908 – 12 May 1979) was a French rowing coxswain who competed in coxed pair. Together with André Giriat and Anselme Brusa he won the national title in 1927 and 1931, the European title in 1931, and an Olympic bronze medal in 1932.
