= Martin Formanack =

American rower

Olympic medal record

Men's rowing
Silver medal – second place	1904 St. Louis	Coxless four

Martin Formanack (December 1, 1866 – November 1, 1947) was an American rower who competed in the 1904 Summer Olympics.

He was born in a part of Germany and died in St. Louis, Missouri. In 1904, he was part of the American boat, winning the silver medal in the coxless four.
