= Frank Dummerth =

American rower

Olympic medal record

Men's rowing
Bronze medal – third place	1904 St. Louis	Coxless four

Frank Dummerth (January 6, 1871 – August 7, 1936) was an American rower who competed in the 1904 Summer Olympics. He was born and died in St. Louis, Missouri. In 1904 he was part of the American boat which won the bronze medal in the coxless four.
