= Charles Armstrong (rower) =

American rower (1881–1952)

Olympic medal record

Men's rowing

Representing the United States
| Gold medal – first place | 1904 St. Louis | Eight |

Charles Ewing Armstrong (October 23, 1881 – March 12, 1952) was an American rower who competed in the 1904 Summer Olympics.

He was born in Philadelphia. In 1904, he was part of the American boat that won the gold medal in the men's eight.
