= John Freitag =

American rower

Olympic medal record

Men's rowing
Bronze medal – third place	1904 St. Louis	Coxless four

John W. Freitag (May 3, 1877 – October 20, 1932) was an American rower who competed in the 1904 Summer Olympics.

He was born in Columbia, Illinois in 1877 and died in St. Louis, Missouri in 1932. In 1904, he was part of the American boat that won the bronze medal in the coxless four.
