= Joseph Dempsey =

American rower (1875–1942)

Olympic medal record

Men's rowing

Representing the United States
Gold medal – first place	1904 St. Louis	Men's eight

Joseph Francis Dempsey (October 12, 1875 – August 7, 1942) was an American rower who competed in the 1904 Summer Olympics. He was a member of the American boat team that won the gold medal in the men's eight.

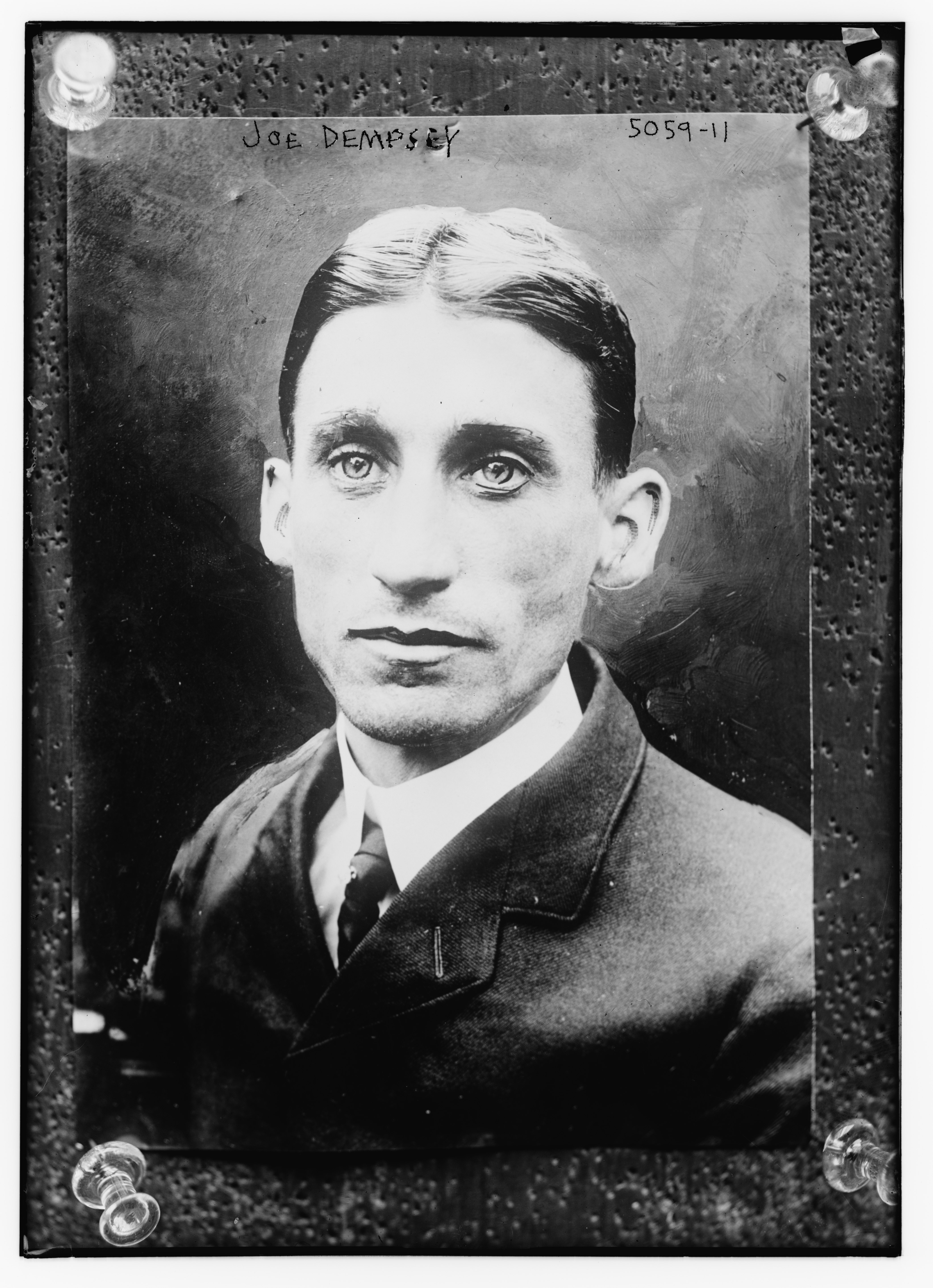

== Formative years and family ==
Born in Philadelphia, Pennsylvania on October 12, 1875, Dempsey was raised there with his brothers, James and Thomas, during the late nineteenth century. He shared a love of rowing with his brother, James, who later became his rowing coach. In 1927, Joseph Dempsey wed Mary Connor.

== Rowing and business career ==
A member of the American rowing team that won the gold medal in the men's eight at the 1904 Summer Olympics, Dempsey continued to reside in Philadelphia, where he was a member of the Vesper Boat Club for forty years. In 1905, he took over as coach of the Vesper team when his brother, James, who had previously held that position, was unable to continue leading the team. Prohibited by rowing rules designed to prevent professionals from coaching, James stayed at home in Philadelphia while Joseph, who was known as "Joe" to his family and teammates, went on to lead the Vesper team in its preparations for a race against the Leander Club at Henley-on-Thames in England.

Described by Philadelphia's Evening Public Ledger as "one of the best oarsmen of his day and a very capable amateur coach," Joe Dempsey coached his teammates in Philadelphia for two weeks before traveling with them to England, where they "were made honorary members of the Leander Boat Club, the first time Americans had been so honored." Subsequently interviewed by that newspaper about his experience there, he described Henley as "a wonderful place," adding:

"The English were thorough sportsmen and made things pleasant for us. They were nervous over the race, however, for they knew we would give them a hard fight and had a good chance to win. Rowing on Henley course is like rowing down Broad street. There is room enough for two crews, and I used to ride horseback while coaching the men. The races there last three days and are run in heats. We won the first from Christ College by several lengths, but on the second day we drew Leander. That was a great race. We made a mistake in rowing to the starting point and waiting in the hot sun for half an hour while our opponents arrived. The two crews rowed the entire one mile and 550 yards neck and neck, and Leander won by a matter of inches."

During his time in England, Dempsey wrote about his experiences for The Philadelphia Inquirer, which published a series of articles about his team's success there, including Dempsey's own lengthy report that was printed with his own byline as a special correspondent for the publication, in which he reported the following:

"I coached them from horseback and quite a crowd was along the banks to see the American crew, as they call us here. The boys rowed over the course twice, and were watched with much interest. There was a very stiff wind blowing against them. I told them to row easy and then I would send them off on short spurts.... The Leander went out the same day that we first appeared, and they rowed three and a half miles.... I am told that they broke up a couple of other crews so as to have the very best men procurable to meet the Vespers. The Leanders row very differently from us. They use a long body swing and a short slide."

In 1914, he coached the Philadelphia Barge Club (now the University Barge Club). In 1915, he coached Jack Kelly and Walter Smith as they prepared for single scull and double-oar races at the 53rd annual National Regatta in Springfield, Massachusetts.

Professionally, Dempsey was employed by the Packard Motor Company for a quarter of a century. He managed the firm's used car department, retired from his job in 1938, and subsequently found work as a handyman.

== Death ==
Dempsey died in Philadelphia on August 7, 1942. Following a requiem mass at St. Vincent's Church in Germantown, he was interred at the Holy Cross Cemetery in Yeadon, Pennsylvania.
