= Frederick Cresser =

American rower

Olympic medal record

Men's rowing

Representing the United States
Gold medal – first place	1904 St. Louis	Eight

Frederick Cresser (6 April 1872 – 18 May 1919) was an American rower who competed in the 1904 Summer Olympics. He was born in the German Empire. In 1904, he was part of the American boat, which won the gold medal in the eights.
