= John Joachim =

American rower

Olympic medal record

Men's rowing
Bronze medal – third place	1904 St. Louis	Coxless pair

John Louis Joachim (April 8, 1874 – October 21, 1942) was an American rower who competed in the 1904 Summer Olympics. He was born in Ohio and died in St. Louis, Missouri. In 1904, he won the bronze medal in the coxless pair.
