= William Wadsworth (rower) =

Canadian rower

Olympic medal record

Men's rowing
Silver medal – second place	1904 St. Louis	Eight

William Ridout Wadsworth (December 17, 1875 – August 29, 1971) was a Canadian rower who competed in the 1904 Summer Olympics. In 1904 he was a member of Canadian boat, which won the silver medal in the men's eight.
