= Charles Aman =

American rower (1887–1936)

Olympic medal record

Men's rowing
Silver medal – second place	1904 St. Louis	Coxless four

Charles Aman (September 25, 1887 – January 9, 1936) was an American rower who competed in the 1904 Summer Olympics. In 1904, he was part of the American boat which won the silver medal in the coxless fours. He committed suicide in his birthplace of Kansas City, Missouri in 1936.
