= Rowing at the 1932 Summer Olympics – Men's coxed pair =

Olympic rowing event

Men's coxed pair at the Games of the X Olympiad
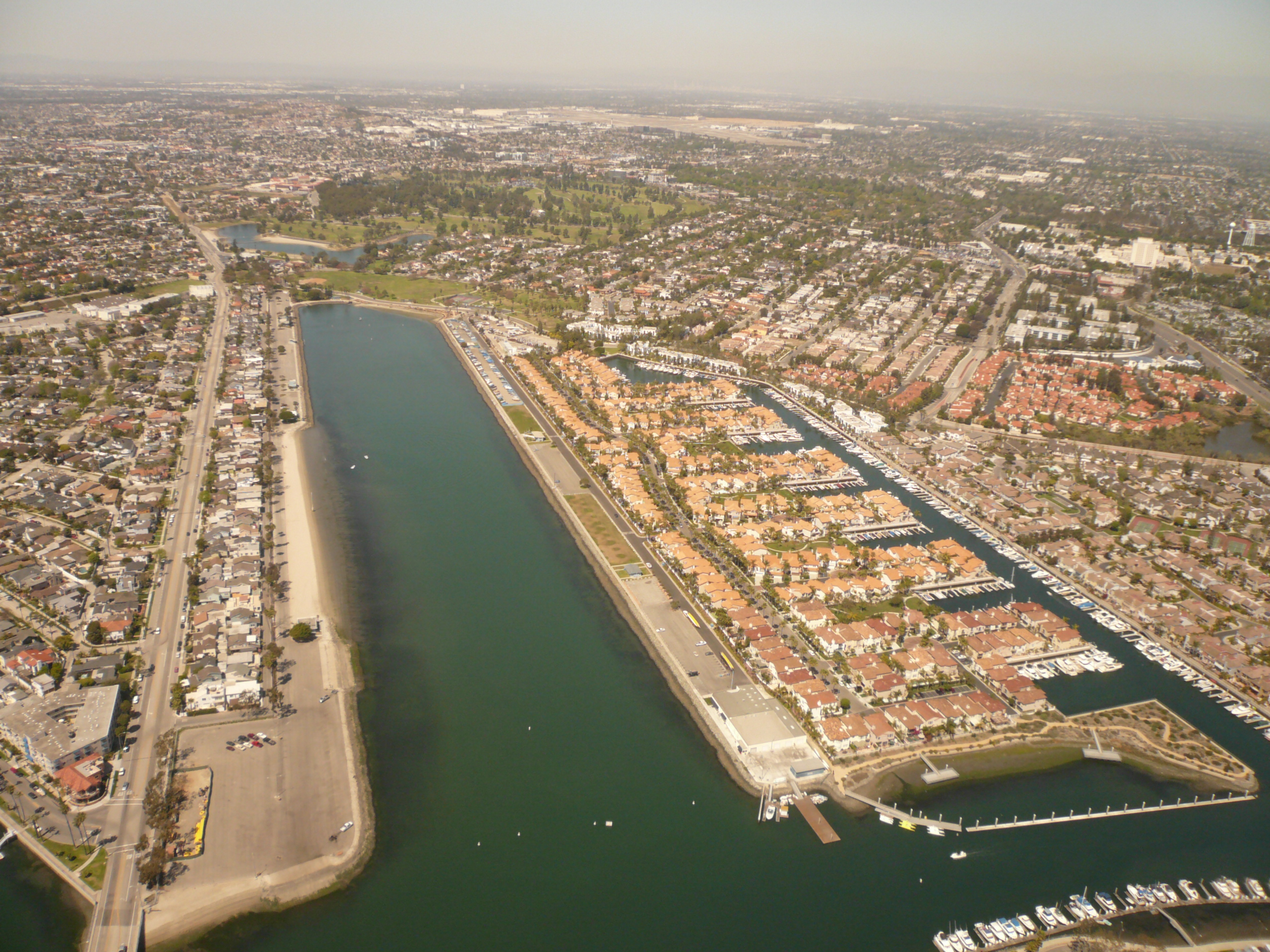
- Long Beach Marine Stadium
- Venue: Long Beach Marine Stadium
- Date: August 13, 1932
- Competitors: 12 from 4 nations
- Winning time: 8:25.8

Medalists
1st place, gold medalist(s)		Charles Kieffer; Joseph Schauers; Edward Jennings (cox); United States
2nd place, silver medalist(s)		Jerzy Braun; Janusz Ślązak; Jerzy Skolimowski (cox); Poland
3rd place, bronze medalist(s)		Anselme Brusa; André Giriat; Pierre Brunet (cox); France

The men's coxed pair competition at the 1932 Summer Olympics in Los Angeles took place are at Long Beach Marine Stadium on 13 August. Competition consisted of a single round. There were 4 boats (12 competitors) from 4 nations, with each nation limited to a single boat in the event. The event was won by the United States, its first victory in the event. Coxswain Edward Jennings had also been on the bronze medal team in 1924, making him the fifth man with multiple medals in the coxed pair. The American rowers were Charles Kieffer and Joseph Schauers. Silver went to Poland, in its coxed pair debut (Jerzy Braun, Janusz Ślązak, and cox Jerzy Skolimowski). France earned bronze (Anselme Brusa, André Giriat, and cox Pierre Brunet).

== Background ==
This was the fifth appearance of the event. Rowing had been on the programme in 1896 but was cancelled due to bad weather. The men's coxed pair was one of the original four events in 1900, but was not held in 1904, 1908, or 1912. It returned to the programme after World War I and was held every Games from 1924 to 1992, when it (along with the men's coxed four) was replaced with the men's lightweight double sculls and men's lightweight coxless four.

None of the crew members from the 1928 coxed pair event returned, though Edward Jennings had been the cox on the American bronze medal team in 1924.

Brazil and Poland each made their debut in the event. France made its fifth appearance, the only nation to have competed in all editions of the event to that point.

== Competition format ==
The coxed pair event featured three-person boats, with two rowers and a coxswain. It was a sweep rowing event, with the rowers each having one oar (and thus each rowing on one side). In sharp contrast to the 1928 tournament, which featured six rounds, the 1932 competition consisted of a single race. All four boats competed in the final. The course used the 2000 metres distance that became the Olympic standard in 1912.

== Schedule ==
Date	Time	Round
Saturday, August 13, 1932	15:00	Final

== Results ==
Rank	Rowers	Coxswain	Nation	Time
1st place, gold medalist(s)	Charles Kieffer; Joseph Schauers	Edward Jennings	United States	8:25.8
2nd place, silver medalist(s)	Jerzy Braun; Janusz Ślązak	Jerzy Skolimowski	Poland	8:31.2
3rd place, bronze medalist(s)	Anselme Brusa; André Giriat	Pierre Brunet	France	8:41.2
4	Francisco de Bricio; José Ramalho	Estevam Strata	Brazil	8:53.2
