= Frank Schell =

American rower (1884–1959)

Medal record

Men's rowing

Representing the United States

Olympic Games
Gold medal – first place	1904 St. Louis	Eight

Frank Reamer Schell (October 22, 1884 – December 5, 1959) was an American rower who competed in the 1904 Summer Olympics. In 1904, he was part of the American boat, which won the gold medal in the eights.
