= George Dietz =

American rower (1880–1965)

Olympic medal record

Men's rowing

Representing the United States
Gold medal – first place	1904 St. Louis	Coxless fours

George John Dietz (January 9, 1880 – April 19, 1965) was an American rower who competed in the 1904 Summer Olympics. In 1904, he was part of the American boat that won the gold medal in the coxless fours.
