= James Flanagan (rower) =

American rower (1878–1937)

Medal record

Men's rowing

Representing the United States

Olympic Games
Gold medal – first place	1904 St. Louis	Men's eight

James Showers Flanagan (August 3, 1878 – March 28, 1937) was an American rower who competed in the 1904 Summer Olympics. In 1904, he was part of the American boat, which won the gold medal in the eights.
