= Joseph Buerger =

American rower

Olympic medal record

Men's rowing
Bronze medal – third place	1904 St. Louis	Coxless pair

John Joseph Buerger (September 19, 1870 – November 10, 1951) was an American rower who competed in the 1904 Summer Olympics. In 1904, he won the bronze medal in the coxless pairs.
