= John Hoben =

American rower

Olympic medal record

Men's rowing
Silver medal – second place	1904 St. Louis	Double sculls

John Grey Hoben (May 6, 1884 – July 5, 1915), also known as Jack Hoben, was an American rower who competed in the 1904 Summer Olympics. He won a silver medal in the double sculls rowing event during the games.
