= William Varley =

American rower (1880–1968)

Medal record

Men's rowing

Representing the United States

Olympic Games
Gold medal – first place	1904 St. Louis	Double sculls
Silver medal – second place	1904 St. Louis	Coxless pairs

William Michael Varley (November 6, 1880 – October 1968) was an American rower who competed in the 1904 Summer Olympics. In 1904 he won the gold medal in the double sculls and silver medal in the coxless pairs with the same partner John Mulcahy. He was born and died in New York City.
