= Lou Heim =

American rower

Olympic medal record

Men's rowing

Representing the United States
Bronze medal – third place	1904 St. Louis	Coxless four

Louis Heim (August 30, 1874 – April 21, 1954) was an American rower who competed in the 1904 Summer Olympics. In 1904, he was part of the Western Rowing Club, which won the bronze medal in the coxless four.
