= George Reiffenstein =

Canadian rower

Olympic medal record

Men's rowing

Representing Canada
Silver medal – second place	1904 St. Louis	Eight

George Patten "Pat" Reiffenstein (later Carr, March 23, 1883 – June 9, 1932) was a Canadian rower who competed in the 1904 Summer Olympics.

He was born in Carleton County, Ontario. In 1904 he was a member of Canadian boat, which won the silver medal in the men's eight. Only two teams, however, competed in the event. He changed his last name to Carr following World War I and died in Whitby, Ontario in 1932.
