= Michael Begley (rower) =

American rower

Olympic medal record

Men's rowing
Silver medal – second place	1904 St. Louis	Coxless four

Michael Begley (September 22, 1872 – August 24, 1938) was an American rower who competed in the 1904 Summer Olympics. He was born in the Irish part of the United Kingdom of Great Britain and Ireland and died in St. Louis, Missouri. In 1904, he was part of the American boat, winning the silver medal in the coxless fours.
