= André Giriat =

French rower (1905–1967)

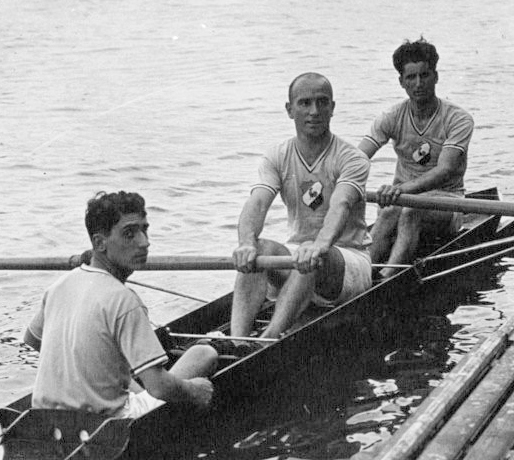
- Brunet, Giriat and Brusa at the 1931 European Championships

Personal information
- Born: 20 August 1905 Villeurbanne, France
- Died: 11 July 1967 (aged 61) Saint-Chamond, France

Sport
- Sport: Rowing
- Club: Cercle de l'Aviron de Lyon, Lyon
Medal record
Representing France
Olympic Games
Bronze medal – third place	1932 Los Angeles	Coxed pair
European Championships
Gold medal – first place	1931 Paris	Coxed pair
Bronze medal – third place	1935 Berlin	Double sculls

André Giriat (20 August 1905 – 11 July 1967) was a French rower. He had his best achievements in coxed pairs, together with Anselme Brusa and coxswain Pierre Brunet, winning the national title in 1927 and 1931, the European title in 1931, and an Olympic bronze medal in 1932. He then rowed double sculls with Robert Jacquet, winning a European bronze medal in 1935 and finishing fourth at the 1936 Olympics.

Giriat won 10 French Championships: in the single scull (1925), coxed pair (1927, 1931), double scull (1935–37, 1939 and 1945) and eight (1942–43).
