= Joseph McLoughlin (rower) =

American rower

Olympic medal record

Men's rowing
Silver medal – second place	1904 St. Louis	Double sculls

Joseph James McLoughlin (August 21, 1878 – December 1962) was an American rower who competed in the 1904 Summer Olympics. In 1904, he won the silver medal in the double sculls.
