= Albert Nasse =

American rower

Medal record

Men's rowing

Representing the United States

Olympic Games
Gold medal – first place	1904 St. Louis	Coxless fours

Albert F. Nasse (July 2, 1878 – November 21, 1910) was an American rower who competed in the 1904 Summer Olympics. In 1904 he was part of the American boat, which won the gold medal in the coxless four.
