= Francisco de Bricio =

Brazilian rower

Personal information
- Born: 15 August 1890; Juiz de Fora, Brazil
- Died: 5 February 1978 (aged 87)

Sport
- Sport: Rowing

Francisco de Bricio (15 August 1890 – 5 February 1978) was a Brazilian rower. He competed in the men's coxed pair event at the 1932 Summer Olympics.
