= Anselme Brusa =

French rower (1899–1969)

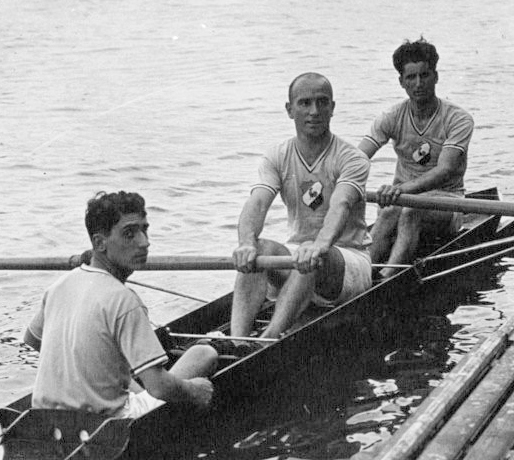
- Brunet, Giriat and Brusa at the 1931 European Championships

Personal information
- Born: 27 August 1899 Chiasso, Switzerland
- Died: 24 July 1969 (aged 69) Lyon, France
- Height: 170 cm (5 ft 7 in)

Sport
- Sport: Rowing
- Club: Cercle de l'Aviron de Lyon, Lyon
Medal record
Representing France
Olympic Games
Bronze medal – third place	1932 Los Angeles	Coxed pair
European Rowing Championships
Gold medal – first place	1931 Paris	Coxed pair

Plinio Ansèlme Brusa (27 August 1899 – 24 July 1969) was an Italian-Swiss-French rower who competed for France in the coxed pair event. Together with André Giriat and coxswain Pierre Brunet he won the French championships in 1927 and 1931, the European title in 1931, and an Olympic bronze medal in 1932.

Brusa was Italian. He was born in Switzerland, where he won a national title in gymnastics. After World War I he immigrated to France and became a French citizen in the early 1930s.
