= John Mulcahy (rower) =

American rower (1876–1942)

Medal record

Men's rowing

Representing the United States

Olympic Games
Gold medal – first place	1904 St. Louis	Double sculls
Silver medal – second place	1904 St. Louis	Coxless pair

John Joseph Francis Mulcahy (July 20, 1876 – November 19, 1942) was the winner of the 1904 Olympic double scull event with his partner William Varley. The duo also won the silver medal in the pair without coxswain event. Mulcahy was one of the most accomplished rowers to come from the New York City area and served as president of the Atalanta Boat Club (established in 1848) on New York City's Harlem River. He graduated from Fordham University in 1894 and established Fordham's first rowing team in 1915. He was inducted into the National Rowing Hall of Fame in 1956 and the Fordham University Athletic Hall of Fame in 1991.
