= Harry Lott (rower) =

American rower (1880–1949)

Medal record

Men's rowing

Representing the United States

Olympic Games
Gold medal – first place	1904 St. Louis	Men's eight

Harry Hunter Lott (January 13, 1880 – February 5, 1949) was an American rower who competed in the 1904 Summer Olympics, winning the gold medal in the men's eight. He was born in Philadelphia.

Lott rowed for the Vesper Boat Club while he was a medical student at the Jefferson Medical College in Philadelphia. After the Olympics, he earned his medical degree and practiced in Philadelphia as an otolaryngologist specializing in diseases of the ear. He eventually became a professor at his alma mater, which was eventually renamed Thomas Jefferson University.
