= Rowland George =

British rower

Medal record

Men's rowing

Representing Great Britain

Olympic Games
Gold medal – first place	1932 Los Angeles	Coxless four

Rowland David George, DSO, OBE (15 January 1905 – 9 September 1997) was a British rower who won gold in the 1932 Summer Olympics. As a World War II wing commander he was the only member of the Royal Air Force Equipment Branch to be awarded the Distinguished Service Order. Until his death he was the oldest surviving British Olympic gold medallist.

== Early life and Olympic success ==
George was born at Bath, Somerset, the third son (fourth child) of John Ellis George and May Louise George. He was educated at Wycliffe College and Lincoln College, Oxford. He started rowing at Oxford, but was not yet at a standard to compete in the Boat Race. After one race a doctor ordered him never to set foot in a boat again as he was so exhausted. He entered business with E. S. & A. Robinson(later part of Dickinson Robinson Group), a firm of printers and packing manufacturers in Bristol, and in 1929 he was transferred to the London office in Colliers Wood, which gave him the opportunity to start rowing again.

In 1930 he joined Thames Rowing Club. In 1931 at Henley Royal Regatta, he was in the winning Thames coxless four in the Wyfold Challenge Cup and in the Thames eight that lost narrowly in the final of the Grand Challenge Cup. In 1932 at Henley he was in the runner-up Thames eight in the final of the Grand again and was also the winning Thames crew in the Stewards Challenge Cup. The Thames coxless four was then chosen to represent Great Britain rowing at the 1932 Summer Olympics and won the gold medal in a hard race against the German crew.

George married Hon. Sylvia Beatrice Norton, daughter of Cecil Norton, 1st Baron Rathcreedan and Marguerite Cecil Huntington, at St Mary's Henley on 22 April 1933 and had three sons and a daughter.

== World War II ==
In World War II, George joined the Royal Air Force Volunteer Reserve serving in the Equipment Branch as he was too old for flying training. He was commissioned as an acting pilot officer on 9 November 1939, promoted pilot officer on 8 January 1940 flying officer on 1 December 1940, and temporary flight lieutenant on 1 March 1942. In late 1942, as an acting squadron leader, he commanded the RAF unit responsible for supplies passing through the harbour at Bone, Algeria, as part of the Operation Torch landings. He was appointed Officer of the Order of the British Empire in the 1943 King's Birthday Honours in recognition of his efforts supporting the operation while under considerable harassment from the Luftwaffe.

In 1943 as an acting wing commander, and due to the reputation he had gained in Algeria, he was appointed to the staff planning the Allied invasion of Sicily. He was in charge of the supply system from the beaches to the airfields during the Salerno landings. He landed on the beaches with the first assault troops on 10 September 1943 and came under fire on the beaches and on the way to the supply dumps and airfields. He carried on even though he was wounded when his tented camp was hit by two bombs. He was subsequently awarded the Distinguished Service Order, and the citation published on 26 May 1944 read:

Air Ministry, 26th May, 1944.

The KING has been graciously pleased to approve the following award:—

Distinguished Service Order.

Acting Wing Commander Rowland David GEORGE, O.B.E. (75777), Royal Air Force Volunteer Reserve.

Wing Commander George, the senior movements staff officer, was responsible for the smooth and efficient working of the supply system from the beaches to the airfields during the assault landings at Salerno. He landed with the first assault troops on the beaches in the early morning of l0th September, 1943. Thereafter, he was under fire, both on the beaches and whilst travelling between the various supply dumps and airfields, until the enemy had been forced to retreat sufficiently to allow the airfields to be occupied by units of the Tactical Air Force. Wing Commander George was wounded when his tented camp was hit by 2 enemy bombs; he did not, however, allow this to interfere with his personal supervision of the work of unloading and distributing the urgently required supplies. Throughout the operation Wing Commander George displayed great gallantry and his example

and coolness whilst under fire were an inspiration to those under his command and contributed largely to the success of the operation.

He was also Mentioned in Despatches on 14 January 1944, and again on 8 June 1944. Though an acting wing commander, his substantive rank was still flight lieutenant, he was promoted war substantive squadron leader on 18 June 1944. He was also awarded the US Legion of Merit (degree of Officer) in 1944.

== Later life ==
After the war George returned to work for Robinsons, becoming managing director of their subsidiaries in Colliers Wood and, later, Ipswich. He retained an RAFVR commission and on 13 April 1948 transferred to the Royal Auxiliary Air Force as a squadron leader in the Aircraft Control Branch. He became commanding officer of the County of Suffolk Fighter Control Unit, relinquishing the post on 1 June 1951 when he transferred to the reserve. He also returned to Colliers Wood at this time.

In 1959 George took early retirement as he wished to return to his roots in Bath. Here he was active as a Christian Scientist, and was also chairman of the Bath Council of Social Services, the Bath Society for the Blind and secretary of the Bath Preservation Trust. He was increasingly affected by deafness resulting from his war service, but this did not prevent him learning Spanish when he was invited to the 1992 Summer Olympics in Barcelona, a guest of the British Olympic Association 60 years after winning in Los Angeles.

George died at the age of 92 and was buried in the cemetery at Berkeley, Gloucestershire. Sylvia had died in 1984, one son also predeceased him.
