= Joseph Wright (rower) =

Canadian rower (1864–1950)

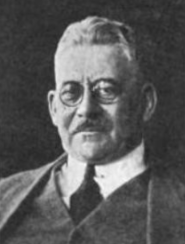
- In The Pennsylvania Gazette, March 1922

Personal information
- Full name: Joseph Walter Harris Wright
- Born: 14 January 1864 Villanova, Canada West
- Died: 18 October 1950 (aged 86) Toronto, Ontario, Canada
- Height: 6 ft 2 in (188 cm)
- Weight: 195 lb (88 kg)
- Relatives: Joseph Wright Jr. (son), George F. Wright. (son)

Sport
- Sport: Rowing
- Club: Argonaut Rowing Club, Toronto
Medal record
Representing Canada
Olympic Games
Silver medal – second place	1904 St. Louis	Eight

Joseph Walter Harris Wright (14 January 1864 – 18 October 1950) was a Canadian rower, municipal politician, and all-round athlete who had success in a variety of sports in the late nineteenth and early twentieth centuries.

As rowing competitor and coach Wright had more than 130 titles to his credit in numerous rowing classes, including taking the U.S. National Fours and Pairs titles in 1895. He competed in the 1904 Summer Olympics and was a member of the Canadian boat which won the silver medal in the men's eight. He retired from competition at 42 years of age in 1906 after winning two heats of the Grand Challenge Cup in the men's eight at the Henley Royal Regatta - just missing winning the event in the final. He then devoted his time to coaching at the Argonaut Rowing Club. He coached the legendary crews of Geoffrey Barron Taylor helping them win the Royal Canadian Henley Regatta five times in 1907. He also coached stroke Taylor's Argonaut eights crews, representing Canada, at the 1908 Summer Olympics winning the bronze medal, and again at the 1912 Summer Olympics.

Off the water, Wright was an accomplished athlete in track and field, sprint, and billiards. He claimed amateur titles in both wrestling and boxing and set throw records in shot put and hammer throw. He also served as coach-captain of the Toronto Argonauts rugby-football team, an adjunct of the rowing club, in the 1890s.

Hired in 1916 to coach at the University of Pennsylvania, Wright, who had seen the popularity of lightweight rowing grow after its introduction to the Canadian Henley in 1906, advocated for its adoption at US colleges. The first intercollegiate lightweight contest, set between Penn and Yale for May 12, 1917, was cancelled by the onset of WWI. Following the end of the war, on May 31, 1919, the first event on the program of the American Rowing Association, a "Special Eight-Oared Shells (150 Lb. Crews)" featuring Navy and Penn, marked the beginning of intercollegiate lightweight rowing in the US. Wright resigned his position in 1925 over a dispute regarding the boating of his varsity eight. Since 1938, the trophy awarded to the winner of the intercollegiate lightweight varsity eight race, initially sponsored by the American Rowing Association, and then by the Eastern Association of Rowing Colleges, has been the Joseph Wright Trophy.

He was elected to Toronto City Council in 1928, and served three terms before being defeated in the 1931 election.

His eldest son George F. Wright, won a bronze medal at the 1908 Summer Olympics and his younger son Joseph Wright Jr. won a silver medal in the double sculls competition at the 1928 Summer Olympics.

Joseph Wright died at his daughter's home in Toronto on 18 October 1950, and was buried at St. James Cemetery.
