= Don MacKenzie (rower) =

Canadian rower

Personal information
- Born: Donald Ross MacKenzie; December 30, 1874 Toronto, Ontario, Canada
- Died: November 12, 1925 (aged 50) Toronto, Ontario, Canada

Sport
- Sport: Rowing
- Club: Argonaut Rowing Club, Toronto
Medal record
Men's rowing
Representing Canada
Olympic Games
Silver medal – second place	1904 St. Louis	Eight

Donald Ross MacKenzie (December 30, 1874 – November 12, 1925) was a Canadian rower who competed in the 1904 Summer Olympics.

In 1904, he was a member of Canadian boat, which won the silver medal in the men's eight.
