= Arthur Stockhoff =

American rower (1879–1934)

Medal record

Men's rowing

Representing the United States

Olympic Games
Gold medal – first place	1904 St. Louis	Coxless fours

Arthur Martin Stockhoff (November 19, 1879 – October 20, 1934) was an American rower who competed in the 1904 Summer Olympics. In 1904 he was part of the American boat, which won the gold medal in the coxless fours.
