= John Rice (rower) =

Canadian rower

Olympic medal record

Men's rowing

Representing Canada
Silver medal – second place	1904 St. Louis	Eight

John Wylie "Colonel" Rice (February 18, 1881 – February 12, 1941) was an American-Canadian rower who competed in the 1904 Summer Olympics. He was a member of the Argonaut Rowing Club, which won the silver medal in the men's eight. Only two teams, however, competed in the event.
