= George Strange =

Canadian rower

Personal information
- Born: November 9, 1880 Portage la Prairie, Manitoba
- Died: June 22, 1961 (aged 80) Toronto, Ontario

Sport
- Country: Canada
- Sport: Rowing
Medal record
Men's rowing
Representing Canada
Silver medal – second place	1904 St. Louis	Eight

George M. Strange (November 9, 1880 – June 22, 1961) was a Canadian rower who competed in the 1904 Summer Olympics. He was born in Portage la Prairie, Manitoba to George William Strange and Elizabeth Johnson and died in Toronto in 1961. He is buried in Mount Pleasant Cemetery with wife Lillian Georgina Hall Tate. At the 1904 Summer Games, held in St. Louis, he was a member of Canadian rowing team that won the silver medal in the men's eight.
