= John Exley =

American rower (1867–1938)

Olympic medal record

Men's rowing

Representing the United States
Gold medal – first place	1900 Paris	Men's eight
Gold medal – first place	1904 St. Louis	Men's eight

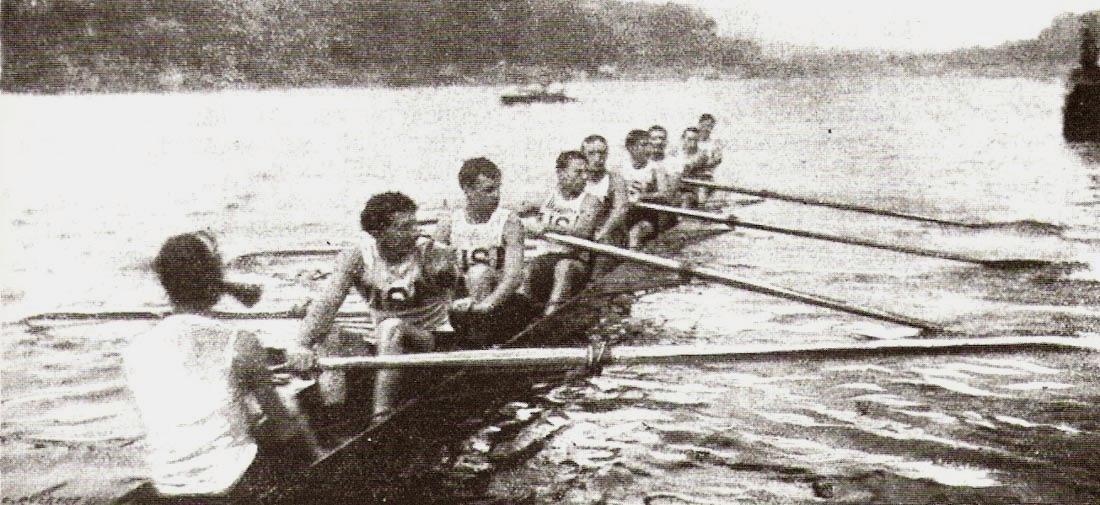
the 1900 US rowing team

John Onins Exley Jr. (May 23, 1867 in Philadelphia, Pennsylvania – July 27, 1938 in Milford, Delaware) was an American rower, born in Philadelphia, who competed in the 1900 Summer Olympics and in the 1904 Summer Olympics.

In 1900, he was part of the American boat Vesper Boat Club, which won the gold medal in the men's eight. Four years later, he won his second gold medal in the men's eight.
