= Rowing at the 1932 Summer Olympics – Men's coxless four =

Men's coxless four at the Games of the X Olympiad
- Venue: Long Beach Marine Stadium
- Date: August 10–13, 1932
- Competitors: 20 from 5 nations
- Winning time: 6:58.2

Medalists
1st place, gold medalist(s)		John Badcock; Jack Beresford; Hugh Edwards; Rowland George	Great Britain
2nd place, silver medalist(s)		Karl Aletter; Walter Flinsch; Ernst Gaber; Hans Maier	Germany
3rd place, bronze medalist(s)		Francesco Cossu; Giliante D'Este; Antonio Garzoni Provenzani; Antonio Ghiardello	Italy

The Men's coxless four competition at the 1932 Summer Olympics in Los Angeles took place at the Long Beach Marine Stadium.

== Schedule ==
Date	Round
Wednesday, August 10, 1932	Heats
Thursday, August 11, 1932	Repechage
Saturday, August 13, 1932	Final

== Results ==
=== Heats ===
First boat of each heat qualified for the final, remainder go to repechage.

==== Heat 1 ====
Rank	Rowers	Country	Time	Notes
1	Badcock, Beresford, Edwards, George	Great Britain	7:13.2	Q
2	Johnson, Mattson, McCosker, Pierie	United States	7:19.4	
3	Aletter, Flinsch, Gaber, Maier	Germany	7:37.8	

==== Heat 2 ====
Rank	Rowers	Country	Time	Notes
1	Cossu, D'Este, Garzoni Provenzani, Ghiardello	Italy	7:06.8	Q
2	Courtney, Gammon, Herman, Pelham	Canada	7:12.0	

=== Repechage ===
First two qualify to the final.

Rank	Rowers	Country	Time	Notes
1	Aletter, Flinsch, Gaber, Maier	Germany	7:17.2	Q
2	Johnson, Mattson, McCosker, Pierie	United States	7:18.4	Q
3	Courtney, Gammon, Herman, Pelham	Canada	7:20.2	

=== Final ===
Rank	Rowers	Country	Time	Notes
1st place, gold medalist(s)	Badcock, Beresford, Edwards, George	Great Britain	6:58.2	
2nd place, silver medalist(s)	Aletter, Flinsch, Gaber, Maier	Germany	7:03.0	
3rd place, bronze medalist(s)	Cossu, D'Este, Garzoni Provenzani, Ghiardello	Italy	7:04.0	
4	Johnson, Mattson, McCosker, Pierie	United States	7:14.2	
