= George Mattson (rower) =

American rower

Personal information
- Born: November 20, 1908 Philadelphia, Pennsylvania, United States
- Died: November 15, 1997 (aged 88) Upper Darby, Pennsylvania, United States

Sport
- Sport: Rowing

George Mattson (November 20, 1908 – November 15, 1997) was an American rower. He competed in the men's coxless four event at the 1932 Summer Olympics.
