= Thomas Loudon =

Canadian rower, sports executive, and professor (1883–1968)

Olympic medal record

Men's rowing
Silver medal – second place	1904 St. Louis	Eight

Thomas Richardson Loudon (September 1, 1883 – January 6, 1968) was a Canadian rower, sports executive, and professor. As a coxswain he competed in the 1904 Summer Olympics.

Loudon was born on September 1, 1883, in Toronto, Ontario. In 1904, he coxed the Canadian boat which won the silver medal in the men's eight. He graduated from the University of Toronto with a bachelor of science degree in 1909. He began lecturing at the university in 1910, helped establish its aeronautics course, and was the Toronto Varsity Blues rowing team coach for 16 years. He served with the Canadian Expeditionary Force during World War I, then later served as president of the Toronto Flying Club. After retiring as a professor, he worked for De Havilland Canada, and was chairman of the Toronto branch of the Engineering Institute of Canada. Other contributions to sport included serving as president of the Amateur Athletic Union of Canada, and the Canadian Association of Amateur Oarsmen. He was married to his wife, Frances, and died in Toronto on January 6, 1968.
