= Alan Bailey (rower) =

Canadian rower (1881–1961)

Personal information
- Born: March 27, 1881
- Died: March 3, 1961 (aged 79)
Medal record
Men's rowing
Representing Canada
Silver medal – second place	1904 St. Louis	Eight

Alan Brian Bailey (March 27, 1881 – March 3, 1961) was a Canadian rower who competed in the 1904 Summer Olympics. He was a member of the Argonaut Rowing Club, which won the silver medal in the men's eight. Only two teams, however, competed in the event.
