= Phil Boyd =

Canadian rower

Olympic medal record

Men's rowing

Representing Canada
Silver medal – second place	1904 St. Louis	Eight

Philip Ewing Boyd (June 5, 1876 – November 16, 1967) was an Olympic rower who won a silver medal for Canada in the 1904 Summer Olympics.
