= Louis Abell =

American rower (1884–1962)

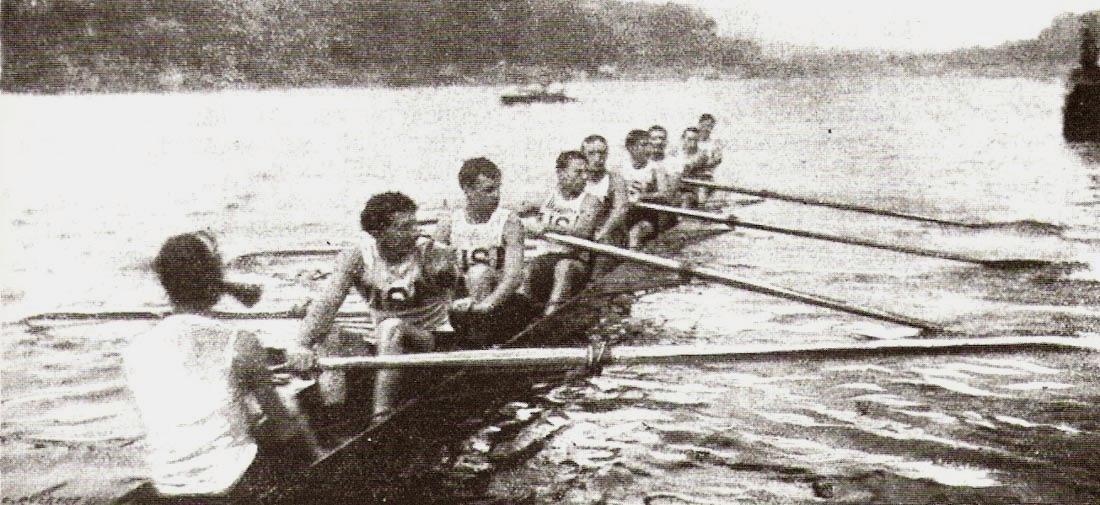
- Men's eight rowing team at the 1900 Olympic Games

Personal information
- Born: Louis Grenville Abell; July 21, 1884 Elizabeth, New Jersey, U.S.
- Died: October 25, 1962 (aged 78) Elizabeth, New Jersey, U.S.
- Height: 165 cm (5 ft 5 in)
- Weight: 53 kg (117 lb)
Medal record
Men's rowing
Representing the United States
Olympic Games
Gold medal – first place	1900 Paris	Eight
Gold medal – first place	1904 St. Louis	Eight

Louis Grenville Abell (July 21, 1884 – October 25, 1962) was an American rower who competed in the 1900 Summer Olympics and in the 1904 Summer Olympics.

In 1900, he was the coxswain of the American boat Vesper Boat Club, which won the gold medal in the men's eight. Four years later, he won his second gold medal as coxswain of the American boat in the eight. After his retirement from sports, he served on the board of health in his hometown of Elizabeth, New Jersey for 40 years.
