= Frederick Suerig =

American rower

Olympic medal record

Men's rowing
Silver medal – second place	1904 St. Louis	Coxless fours

Frederick G. Suerig (June 21, 1878 – December 8, 1929) was an American rower who competed in the 1904 Summer Olympics. He was born in Washington, Missouri and died in St. Louis, Missouri. In 1904 he was part of the American boat, which won the silver medal in the coxless fours.
