= Gus Voerg =

American rower

Olympic medal record

Men's rowing
Bronze medal – third place	1904 St. Louis	Coxless four

August "Gus" Voerg (June 7, 1870 – April 21, 1944), also known as Gustav Voerg, was an American rower who competed in the 1904 Summer Olympics.

In 1904 he was part of the American boat which won the bronze medal in the coxless four.
