= Ernst Gaber =

German rower (1907–1975)

Personal information
- Born: 6 June 1907 Mannheim, Germany
- Died: 13 August 1975 (aged 68)
- Height: 185 cm (6 ft 1 in)

Sport
- Sport: Rowing
- Club: MRV Amicitia
Medal record
Men's rowing
Representing Nazi Germany
Olympic Games
| Gold medal – first place | 1936 Berlin | Coxed four |
| Silver medal – second place | 1932 Los Angeles | Coxless four |
European Rowing Championships
| Gold medal – first place | 1935 Berlin | Coxed four |

Ernst Gaber (6 June 1907 – 13 August 1975) was a German rower who competed in the 1928 Summer Olympics, in the 1932 Summer Olympics, and in the 1936 Summer Olympics.

In 1928 he was part of the German boat which placed fifth after being eliminated in the quarter-finals of the eight event.

Four years later he won the silver medal as member of the German boat in the coxless fours competition. He was also part of the German boat which eliminated in the repechage of the eight event.

In 1936 he won the gold medal as part of the German boat in the coxed four competition.
