= Joseph Ravannack =

American rower

Olympic medal record

Men's rowing
Bronze medal – third place	1904 St. Louis	Double sculls

John Joseph Ravannack (March 19, 1878 – October 10, 1910) was an American rower who competed in the 1904 Summer Olympics. He was born in Louisiana. In 1904, he won the bronze medal in the double sculls.
