= Robert Farnan (rower) =

American rower (1877–1939)

Olympic medal record

Men's rowing

Representing the United States
| Gold medal – first place | 1904 St. Louis | Coxless pairs |

Robert E. Farnan (June 11, 1877 – January 10, 1939) was an American rower who competed in the 1904 Summer Olympics. He was born and died in New York City. In 1904, he won the gold medal in the coxless pairs.
