= Karl Aletter =

German rower

Personal information
- Born: Karl Theophil Christian Aletter; 8 July 1906 Mannheim, German Empire
- Died: 29 March 1991 (aged 84) Kaiserslautern, Germany

Sport
- Sport: Rowing
Medal record
Men's rowing
Representing Germany
Silver medal – second place	1932 Los Angeles	Coxless four

Karl Theophil Christian Aletter (8 July 1906 – 29 March 1991) was a German rower who competed in the 1928 Summer Olympics and in the 1932 Summer Olympics.

Aletter was born in Mannheim in 1906.

In 1928 he was part of the German boat which placed fifth after being eliminated in the quarter-finals of the eight event. Four years later he won the silver medal as member of the German boat in the coxless fours competition. He was also part of the German boat which eliminated in the repechage of the eight event.

He was later a medical doctor in Kaiserslautern, and the deputy chairman of the German Rowing Association. He died in Kaiserslautern on 29 March 1991.
