= Rowing at the Summer Olympics =

- IOC Code: ROW (all Rowing); RCB (Coastal Rowing)
- Governing body: World Rowing
- Events: 15 (men: 7; women: 7; mixed: 1)

Summer Olympics
- 1896; 1900; 1904; 1908; 1912; 1920; 1924; 1928; 1932; 1936; 1948; 1952; 1956; 1960; 1964; 1968; 1972; 1976; 1980; 1984; 1988; 1992; 1996; 2000; 2004; 2008; 2012; 2016; 2020; 2024; 2028; 2032
- Medalists; men; women; Records

Rowing has been part of the Summer Olympics since its debut in the 1900 Games. Rowing was on the program at the 1896 Summer Olympics but was cancelled due to bad weather. Only men were allowed to compete until the women's events were introduced at the 1976 Summer Olympics in Montreal which gave national federations the incentive to support women's events and catalysed growth in women's rowing. Lightweight rowing events (which have weight-limited crews) were introduced to the games in 1996. Qualifying for the rowing events is under the jurisdiction of the World Rowing Federation. World Rowing predates the modern Olympics and was the first international sport federation to join the modern Olympic movement.

== Summary ==
Games	Year	Events	Best Nation
1			
2	1900	5	France (1)
3	1904	5	United States (1)
4	1908	4	Great Britain (1)
5	1912	4	Great Britain (2)
6			
7	1920	5	United States (2)
8	1924	7	United States (3)
9	1928	7	United States (4)
10	1932	7	United States (5)
11	1936	7	Germany (1)
12			
13			
14	1948	7	Great Britain (3)
15	1952	7	United States (6)
16	1956	7	United States (7)
17	1960	7	United Team of Germany (1)

Games	Year	Events	Best Nation
18	1964	7	United States (8)
19	1968	7	East Germany (1)
20	1972	7	East Germany (2)
21	1976	14	East Germany (3)
22	1980	14	East Germany (4)
23	1984	14	Romania (1)
24	1988	14	East Germany (5)
25	1992	14	Germany (2)
26	1996	14	Australia (1)
27	2000	14	Romania (2)
28	2004	14	Romania (3)
29	2008	14	Great Britain (4)
30	2012	14	Great Britain (5)
31	2016	14	Great Britain (6)
32	2020	14	New Zealand (1)
33	2024	14	Netherlands (1)
34	2028	15	TBD

== Events ==
At the 2020 and 2024 Olympics, the following 14 events were contested for both men and women: Single sculls, Double sculls, Quadruple sculls, lightweight double sculls, Coxless pair, Coxless four, Eight.

The lightweight events were first threatened in 2002 when the Programme Commission of the IOC recommended that, outside combat sports (boxing and wrestling, but not fencing, shooting, and archery) and weightlifting, there should not be weight-category events. The 2024 Olympics were the last where lightweight rowing will be included.

Other non-Olympic boatclasses, which still compete in World Championships, are currently: men's & women's lightweight single sculls, lightweight quadruple sculls and lightweight coxless pair.

=== Men's events ===
Event	96	00	04	08	12	20	24	28	32	36	48	52	56	60	64	68	72	76	80	84	88	92	96	00	04	08	12	16	20	24	Years	
Current program
Single sculls		•	•	•	•	•	•	•	•	•	•	•	•	•	•	•	•	•	•	•	•	•	•	•	•	•	•	•	•	•	•	30
Double sculls			•			•	•	•	•	•	•	•	•	•	•	•	•	•	•	•	•	•	•	•	•	•	•	•	•	•	•	27
Quadruple sculls																		•	•	•	•	•	•	•	•	•	•	•	•	•	•	14
Coxless pair			•	•			•	•	•	•	•	•	•	•	•	•	•	•	•	•	•	•	•	•	•	•	•	•	•	•	•	27
Coxless four			•	•			•	•	•	•	•	•	•	•	•	•	•	•	•	•	•	•	•	•	•	•	•	•	•	•	•	26
Eight		•	•	•	•	•	•	•	•	•	•	•	•	•	•	•	•	•	•	•	•	•	•	•	•	•	•	•	•	•	•	29
Past events
Coxed pair		•				•	•	•	•	•	•	•	•	•	•	•	•	•	•	•	•	•										18
Coxed four		••			•	•	•	•	•	•	•	•	•	•	•	•	•	•	•	•	•	•										19
Coxed four, with inriggers					•																											1
Lightweight double sculls																							•	•	•	•	•	•	•	•		7
Lightweight coxless four																							•	•	•	•	•	•				6
Total	0	5	5	4	4	5	7	7	7	7	7	7	7	7	7	7	7	8	8	8	8	8	8	8	8	8	8	8	7	7	6	

=== Women's events ===
Event	96	00	04	08	12	20	24	28	32	36	48	52	56	60	64	68	72	76	80	84	88	92	96	00	04	08	12	16	20	24	Years	
Current program
Single sculls																		•	•	•	•	•	•	•	•	•	•	•	•	•	•	14
Double sculls																		•	•	•	•	•	•	•	•	•	•	•	•	•	•	14
Quadruple sculls																		•	•	•	•	•	•	•	•	•	•	•	•	•	•	14
Coxless pair																		•	•	•	•	•	•	•	•	•	•	•	•	•	•	14
Coxless four																						•							•	•	•	4
Eight																		•	•	•	•	•	•	•	•	•	•	•	•	•	•	14
Past events
Coxed four																		•	•	•	•											4
Lightweight double sculls																							•	•	•	•	•	•	•	•		8
Total	0	0	0	0	0	0	0	0	0	0	0	0	0	0	0	0	0	6	6	6	6	6	6	6	6	6	6	6	7	7	6	

== Race distances ==
From 1912 to 2024, all men's races have been over a 2000m course, except for London 1948, where the course was 1850m. In 2024, World Rowing announced that Rowing at the 2028 Olympics will take place over 1500 meters due to limitations of the Long Beach Marine Stadium. This would be shortest ever used for men's Olympic rowing.

Before 1912, it was raced over various distances: the course in Paris in 1900 was 1750m, in St. Louis in 1904 it was 3218m, and in London in 1908 it was 2414m. The 1908 and 1948 events were held over the Henley Royal Regatta course.

Women's races were raced over 1000m until 1988, when they were changed to 2000m.

Early Games featured match races between two or three boats, until the modern six boat side-by-side format was first adopted at the 1936 Olympic Games. With the exception of the 1952 Olympic Games (races between four or five boats), it has been the standard since.

== Qualification ==
There is a limited number of crews permitted to race, so World Rowing holds qualification events in order to determine who competes at the Olympic Games. At the Olympic Games, each National Olympic Committee can only have one boat per event.

The main qualification comes from the previous year's World Rowing Championships. Other qualifying events are called "Continental Qualification Regattas", of which four are held during the year preceding the games - Asia, Africa, Latin America, and Final (open to everyone else). Each year FISA issues details of how many crews qualify at each regatta.

At the World Championships, the top finishing boats guarantee a place for that country - the rowers in the crew can be changed before the games. At the qualification regattas, it is the crew that wins that qualifies for the Olympics, and if members of that crew race in the Olympics they must race in that event.

== Medal table ==
The numbers below are after the 2024 Summer Olympics in Paris.

Rank	Nation	Gold	Silver	Bronze	Total
1	United States	34	32	25	91
2	Great Britain	34	27	17	78
3	East Germany	33	7	8	48
4	Germany	24	16	15	55
5	Romania	22	15	9	46
6	New Zealand	15	7	11	33
7	Australia	13	15	17	45
8	Soviet Union	12	20	10	42
9	Netherlands	12	17	15	44
10	Italy	11	16	16	43
11	Canada	10	18	16	44
12	France	8	15	13	36
13	Switzerland	7	8	10	25
14	Denmark	7	5	13	25
15	Poland	4	4	12	20
16	West Germany	4	4	6	14
17	United Team of Germany	4	4	1	9
18	Norway	3	7	8	18
19	Bulgaria	3	4	7	14
20	Croatia	3	3	2	8
21	Finland	3	1	3	7
22	China	2	4	6	12
23	Czechoslovakia	2	2	7	11
24	Belarus	2	1	4	7
25	Ireland	2	1	2	5
26	Czech Republic	1	3	1	5
27	Greece	1	1	4	6
28	Slovenia	1	1	3	5
28	Yugoslavia	1	1	3	5
30	Argentina	1	1	2	4
31	South Africa	1	1	1	3
31	Ukraine	1	1	1	3
33	Russia	1	0	2	3
34	Belgium	0	6	2	8
35	Austria	0	3	3	6
36	Estonia	0	2	1	3
37	ROC (ROC)	0	2	0	2
37	Sweden	0	2	0	2
39	Lithuania	0	1	3	4
39	Uruguay	0	1	3	4
41	Hungary	0	1	2	3
42	Spain	0	1	0	1
–	Individual Neutral Athletes	0	1	0	1
43	Russian Empire	0	0	1	1
43	Unified Team	0	0	1	1
Totals (44 entries)		282	282	286	850

== Rowing medal leaders (by Summer Olympiad) ==
Games of	Leader	Gold	Silver	Bronze	Total
France, 1900 Paris	France	2	3	1	6
United States, 1904 St. Louis	United States	5	4	4	13
United Kingdom, 1908 London	Great Britain	4	3	1	8
Sweden, 1912 Stockholm	Great Britain	2	2	0	4
Belgium, 1920 Antwerp	United States	3	1	0	4
France, 1924 Paris	United States	2	1	2	5
Netherlands, 1928 Amsterdam	United States	2	2	1	5
United States, 1932 Los Angeles	United States	3	1	0	4
Germany, 1936 Berlin	Germany	5	1	1	7
United Kingdom, 1948 London	Great Britain	2	1	0	3
Finland, 1952 Helsinki	United States	2	0	1	3
Australia, 1956 Melbourne	United States	3	2	1	6
Italy, 1960 Rome	United Team of Germany	3	1	0	4
Japan, 1964 Tokyo	United States	2	1	1	4
Mexico, 1968 Mexico City	East Germany	2	1	0	3
West Germany, 1972 Munich	East Germany	3	1	3	7
Canada, 1976 Montreal	East Germany	9	3	2	14
Soviet Union, 1980 Moscow	East Germany	11	1	2	14
United States, 1984 Los Angeles	Romania	6	2	0	8
South Korea, 1988 Seoul	East Germany	8	1	1	10
Spain, 1992 Barcelona	Germany	4	3	3	10
United States, 1996 Atlanta	Australia	2	1	3	6
Australia, 2000 Sydney	Romania	3	0	0	3
Greece, 2004 Athens	Romania	3	0	0	3
China, 2008 Beijing	Great Britain	2	2	2	6
United Kingdom, 2012 London	Great Britain	4	2	3	9
Brazil, 2016 Rio de Janeiro	Great Britain	3	2	0	5
Japan, 2020 Tokyo	New Zealand	3	2	0	5
France, 2024 Paris	Netherlands	4	3	1	8
United States, 2028 Los Angeles					

== Multiple medalists ==
The table shows those who have won at least 3 gold medals.

Athlete (nation)	Olympics	Gold	Silver	Bronze	Total	Notes
Elisabeta Lipă; Romania	1984, 1988, 1992, 1996, 2000, 2004	5	2	1	8	20 years between first and last gold medal
Steve Redgrave; Great Britain	1984, 1988, 1992, 1996, 2000	5	0	1	6	Gold medals in 1984 (M4+), 1988 (M2- with Andy Holmes), 1992 and 1996 (M2- with Matthew Pinsent) and 2000 (M4-). Only endurance athlete to win Olympic gold at five consecutive games.
Georgeta Damian; Romania	2000, 2004, 2008	5	0	1	6	Won the pair and the eights in both 2000 and 2004, and the pair again in 2008
Doina Ignat; Romania	1992, 1996, 2000, 2004, 2008	4	1	1	6	Part of Romania's three-straight gold medalist eight
Kathrin Boron; Germany	1992, 1996, 2000, 2004, 2008	4	0	1	5	Four straight Olympic golds. Bronze in her final Olympics in the Quadruple Sculls
Viorica Susanu; Romania	1996, 2000, 2004, 2008	4	0	1	5	Won three medals in the women's eight, and two in the pair
Matthew Pinsent; Great Britain	1992, 1996, 2000, 2004	4	0	0	4	Four straight Olympic golds. Won with Steve Redgrave in the pair in 1992 and 1996. In the coxless four in 2000 and in 2004
Jack Beresford; Great Britain	1920, 1924, 1928, 1932, 1936	3	2	0	5	First rower to win a medal at 5 straight Olympics. WWII prevented the opportunity for a sixth medal
Constanța Burcică; Romania	1992, 1996, 2000, 2004, 2008	3	1	1	5	Won three gold medals in the women's lightweight double sculls
Elena Georgescu; Romania	1992, 1996, 2000, 2004, 2008	3	1	1	5	Coxswain of Romania's women's eight
Drew Ginn; Australia	1996, 2004, 2008, 2012	3	1	0	4	
Martin Sinković; Croatia	2012, 2016, 2020, 2024	3	1	0	4	Three straight Olympic golds with brother Valent Sinković in the double sculls in 2016 and the coxless pair in 2020 and 2024. Silver in the quadruple sculls in 2012
Valent Sinković; Croatia	2012, 2016, 2020, 2024	3	1	0	4	Three straight Olympic golds with brother Martin Sinković in the double sculls in 2016 and the coxless pair in 2020 and 2024. Silver in the quadruple sculls in 2012
Eskild Ebbesen; Denmark	1996, 2000, 2004, 2008, 2012	3	0	2	5	Won all his medals in the lightweight coxless four
Marnie McBean; Canada	1992, 1996	3	0	1	4	Along with rowing partner Kathleen Heddle, Canadian with the most gold medals
Kathleen Heddle; Canada	1992, 1996	3	0	1	4	Won all her medals with rowing partner Marnie McBean
James Tomkins; Australia	1992, 1996, 2000, 2004	3	0	1	4	Most medalled Australian rower
John B. Kelly Sr. United States	1920, 1924	3	0	0	3	First rower to win 3 gold medals. Father of movie star turned princess Grace Kelly
Paul Costello; United States	1920, 1924, 1928	3	0	0	3	First man to win 3 gold medals in the same event, the double sculls. Cousin of John B. Kelly Sr.
Vyacheslav Ivanov; Soviet Union	1956, 1960, 1964	3	0	0	3	Won all his medals in the single sculls
Siegfried Brietzke; East Germany	1972, 1976, 1980	3	0	0	3	First German triple gold medalist. Won in the pair and the coxless four
Pertti Karppinen; Finland	1976, 1980, 1984	3	0	0	3	Won all his medals in the single sculls
Agostino Abbagnale; Italy	1988, 1996, 2000	3	0	0	3	His brothers Carmine and Giuseppe each won 2 gold medals.
Liliana Gafencu; Romania	1996, 2000, 2004	3	0	0	3	Won all three medals in Romania's women's eight
Elle Logan; United States	2008, 2012, 2016	3	0	0	3	Won all three medals in USA women's eight
Pete Reed; Great Britain	2008, 2012, 2016	3	0	0	3	Two wins in coxless four, then in eight
Andrew Triggs Hodge; Great Britain	2008, 2012, 2016	3	0	0	3	Two wins in coxless four, then in eight
Hamish Bond; New Zealand	2012, 2016, 2020	3	0	0	3	Two wins in coxless pair, then in eight

== Nations ==
Number of rowers from each nation by year of Olympics, starting with 1896 (when none competed due to bad weather) then 1900 through 2020.

Nation	96	00	04	08	12	20	24	28	32	36	48	52	56	60	64	68	72	76	80	84	88	92	96	00	04	08	12	16	20	24	Years	
Algeria																							1	2	1	3	1	2	2	2	14	
Angola																												2		1	3	
Argentina							9	9		3	26	9		9	12	9	19	10		7	6	6	22	8	6	2	10	2	4	4	192	
Australia					10		10	1	1	12	8	14	26	25	26	11	16	12	16	25	16	28	47	45	45	48	47	29	40	35	593	
Austria					6			2		9	7	4	6	10	7	3	16	3	7	6	5	12	13	8	5			3	3	3	138	
Azerbaijan																											2	2		1	5	
Bahamas																												1			1	
Belgium		12		10	6	20	21	22		7	4	12	7	5	2	1	5	7		6	8	9	5	4	3	3	1	1	2	3	186	
Bermuda																	1											1	1	1	4	
Belarus																							16	10	11	13	5	10	7		72	
Bohemia					1																										1	
Brazil						5	2		19	22	2	3	5	5		2	2	4	10	10	10	8	6	1	4	6	4	4	1	2	137	
Bulgaria																5	8	34	52		37	18	5	4	6	3		2		2	176	
Cameroon																										1	1				2	
Canada			9	17	10	5	14	12	16	10	11	15	13	15	16	15	16	47		54	41	33	36	32	32	34	30	26	29	11	599	
Chile												1	3				1			9	2			6	2	2	1	4	2	4	37	
China																				9	16	33	15	18	17	31	18	17	26	16	216	
Colombia																										1					1	
Ivory Coast																													1		1	
Croatia																						7	8	13	6	4	5	3	3	5	54	
Cuba											5		9		14	11	7	14	26			3	2	11	7	9	6	7	1	2	134	
Czech Republic																							5	1	16	14	12	10	5	6	69	
Czechoslovakia						15		1		17	4	8	11	23	20	16	22	31	26		17	32									243	
Denmark					16	1		10		23	25	25	11	16	14	10	12	7	7	10	3	13	13	14	12	10	10	13	10	16	301	
Dominican Republic																													1		1	
Ecuador																												1			1	
Egypt											1	9		9	17								1	3	3	6	5	2	1	3	60	
El Salvador																										1	2				3	
Spain		6					14				1	6		18		3			13	10	13	22	10	4	9	1		4	6	9	149	
Estonia										1												7	1	3	7	7	6	4	4	4	44	
Finland					6						5	26	9	12	7	2	3	7	1	3	5	3	2			2					93	
France		60			19	14	26	26	5	20	22	17	14	16	23	16	18	14	16	23	12	25	21	19	21	21	14	18	12	14	526	
Great Britain		1		32	24	10	17	19	16	18	26	23	13	26	8	11	17	32	43	42	32	46	37	36	36	43	47	43	43	40	781	
Germany		26		3	25																										54	
Germany								23																							23	
Germany										26																					26	
Saar												7																			7	
Germany												21																			1973	
United Team of Germany													12	26	26																64	
East Germany																26	26	55	53	1	43										204	
West Germany																27	26	39	1	42	39										174	
Germany																						52	48	30	48	47	48	35	22	23	353	
Greece											9	3	1	8					3	1	7	2	5	4	4	5	10	10	4	7	83	
Guatemala																			2	1									4		7	
Hong Kong																						3	1	3	3	4	1	4	1	1	21	
Honduras																										1					1	
Hungary				11	11		7	6		23	10	16	4	12		6	15	8	20		8	8	3	4	6	2	4	3	1	1	189	
Independent Olympic Athletes																						2									1	
Independent Olympic Athletes																														2	2	
India																								2	1	3	3	1	2	1	13	
Indonesia																									1			2	4	1	8	
Iran																										2	2	1	1	3	9	
Iraq																										2		1	1		4	
Ireland											9						1	10	11		3	1	6	4	6	8	1	5	15	16	96	
Italy				1		6	17	26	20	22	26	26	22	26	18	14	21	12	5	23	28	21	32	24	30	19	20	27	24	34	544	
Japan								6	14	17		5	10	14	26	10	3	9		6	12	13	11	8	4	4	5	4	5	5	191	
Kazakhstan																								1		3	2	2	1	1	10	
Kenya																									1	1					2	
South Korea															9					5	28	2	4	3	2	5	4	2	1		65	
Kuwait																					1								1	1	3	
Saudi Arabia																													1		1	
Latvia																						3	4	1							8	
Libya																														1	1	
Lebanon																						1									1	
Lebanon																												1	1		2	
Lithuania																						8	3	2	2	1	4	10	7	6	43	
Morocco																													1	1	2	
Mexico													1	2	3	25	9	1	1	3	2	5	2	5	3	3	2	2	1	3	73	
Monaco								5																		1	1		1	1	9	
Myanmar																										1	1				2	
Namibia																													1		1	
Nicaragua																													2	1	3	
Netherlands		17		4		12	17	25	2	15	6	12		13	17	22	21	28	10	26	16	20	37	35	26	29	32	36	35	35	548	
Nigeria																												1	1		2	
Niger																											1				1	
Norway				9	29	14				1	14	9		2	5		16	14		12	9	6	11	2	3	1	5	5	7	12	186	
New Zealand						1			16			5	8	1	15	14	19	18		22	15	12	11	2	11	16	26	38	30	20	300	
Pakistan																								3							3	
Paraguay																									2		1	2	1	2	8	
Peru														2		3				3					1		1	2	1	3	16	
Philippines																					1			1					1	1	4	
North Korea																	6														6	
Poland							6	14	10	13		10	8	5	11	3	16	19	43		13	15	12	13	23	20	26	26	20	6	332	
Portugal											14	9		5			3					2	4			2	2		2		9	
Puerto Rico																				1	1								1		3	
Qatar																													1		1	
Romania												9		14	7	15	9	30	33	29	34	45	33	32	19	13	15	19	36	45	437	
South Africa								1		1	5	5		5								9	8	8	2	5	6	12	6	1	74	
Russian Empire					1																										1	
Soviet Union												26	25	25	26	27	26	55	54		53										9	
Unified Team																						47									1	
Russia																							24	26	19	10	5	4			88	
Russia																													10		1	
Serbia and Montenegro																									6						6	
Singapore																												1	1	1	3	
Slovenia																						6	7	4	9	10	2			2	40	
Serbia																										3	6	4	3	5	21	
Sudan																													1	1	2	
Switzerland						18	29	13		26	19	13		18	8	18	17	4	10	9	7	9	11	11	6	1	8	11	11	15	292	
Slovakia																							2	1	2						5	
Sweden					28	6				5	3	16	14	19			1	3	7	8	8	7	9	3	1	2	2	1	1		144	
Chinese Taipei																									2	1	1	1	1		6	
Thailand																								1	1		1	2	2	1	8	
Togo																												1	1	1	3	
Trinidad and Tobago																												1	1		2	
Tunisia																								2	1		2	3	4	3	15	
Turkey																						1						2	1	1	5	
Uganda																													1	1	2	
Ukraine																							20	16	10	10	23	8	2	6	95	
United Arab Republic														9																	9	
United States		9	37			17	11	26	26	26	26	26	26	26	26	27	26	55		54	53	52	46	48	45	46	44	41	37	42	856	
Uruguay									1	8	3	3	2	5	2	5	3	1			1	1			3	3	2	1	2	1	46	
Uzbekistan																									3	1		1	2	3	7	
Vanuatu																												1	1		2	
Venezuela																										1		1	2		4	
Vietnam																									2		2	2	4	1	10	
Yugoslavia										20	22	13	1	12	12		15	4	14	5	10			2							130	
Zimbabwe																						2				1	2	2	1	1	8	
Rowers		131	46	87	192	144	200	247	146	345	313	406	262	430	377	357	442	587	484	465	615	660	620	543	557	552	550	550	537	503		17312
Rowers - Male		131	46	87	192	144	200	247	166	345	313	406	262	430	377	357	442	345	328	322	408	449	405	257	362	357	353	331	302	253		
Rowers - Female		0	0	0	0	0	0	0	0	0	0	0	0	0	0	0	0	242	156	143	207	211	215	286	195	195	197	219	235	250		
Rowers - First Games																																
Countries		7	2	8	14	14	14	19	12	24	27	33	25	33	27	29	35	31	26	31	38	45	45	51	55	60	58	69	79	66		
New countries		7	1	3	7	4	2	4	1	3	5	5	2	1	1	3	2	0	1	2	2	11	6	5	7	9	2	9	10	2		
Events		5	5	4	4	5	7	7	7	7	7	7	7	7	7	7	7	14	14	14	14	14	14	14	14	14	14	14	14	14	1	
Boats		131	46	87	192	35	46	67	36	95	84	113	69	116	100	102	126	159	136	140	182	198	210	192	202	206	206	215	211	199		
Year	96	00	04	08	12	20	24	28	32	36	48	52	56	60	64	68	72	76	80	84	88	92	96	00	04	08	12	16	20	24		

== See also ==
- Rowing at the Summer Paralympics
- List of rowing venues - includes Olympic venues and non Olympic venues
- New Zealand rowers at the Summer Olympics
