= Deaths in September 1997 =

The following is a list of notable deaths in September 1997.

Entries for each day are listed alphabetically by surname. A typical entry lists information in the following sequence:

- Name, age, country of citizenship at birth, subsequent country of citizenship (if applicable), reason for notability, cause of death (if known), and reference.

== September 1997 ==
=== 1 ===
- Boris Balinsky, 91, Ukrainian and South African biologist, embryologist and entomologist.
- Gordon Blake, 87, U.S. Air Force lieutenant general.
- Harriet Browne, 65, American tap dancer and choreographer.
- Zoltán Czibor, 68, Hungarian footballer and Olympian (1952).
- Joseph Abel Francis, 73, American Catholic bishop.
- Reidar Olsen, 86, Norwegian footballer.

=== 2 ===
- Robert Abernathy, 80, American baseball player.
- George E. Allen, 85, American football player and coach.
- Sir Rudolf Bing, 95, Austrian-born opera manager, Alzheimer's disease.
- Viktor Frankl, 92, Austrian neurologist and psychiatrist.
- Warner T. Koiter, 83, Dutch mechanical engineer and professor.
- Joseph Thomas O'Keefe, 78, American prelate of the Roman Catholic Church, heart failure.
- Germán Rieckehoff, 82, Puerto Rican politician.
- Mary Sears, 92, American oceanographer.
- John Stanes, 86, Australian cricketer.

=== 3 ===
- Arthur Chin, 83, American pilot and World War II flying ace.
- Tony Demers, 80, Canadian ice hockey player (Montreal Canadiens, New York Rangers).
- Harold G. Dick, 90, American mechanical engineer.
- Hal Goodman, 82, American producer and screenwriter.
- Hans Niclaus, 83, German Olympic basketball player (1936).
- Ernst C. Stiefel, 89, German-American jurist.

=== 4 ===
- Khaled Abdul-Wahab, 86, Tunisian rescuer of Jews.
- Chuck Arnold, 71, American racecar driver.
- Bernard Batillat, 89, French rower and Olympian (1936).
- Jeffrey Bernard, 65, British journalist, renal failure.
- Dharamvir Bharati, 70, Indian poet, author and playwright, heart disease.
- Pierre Chatenet, 80, French politician.
- Natko Devčić, 83, Croatian composer.
- Hans Eysenck, 81, German-born British psychologist, brain cancer.
- Alfred Kałuziński, 44, Polish handball player and Olympian (1976, 1980).
- Ivan Nenov, 95, Bulgarian painter.
- Jan Opperman, 58, American racecar driver.
- Florence Engel Randall, 79, American author.
- Aldo Rossi, 66, Italian architect and designer, traffic collision.
- Belle Stewart, 91, Scottish traditional singer.

=== 5 ===
- Mildred Dein, 85, American screenwriter.
- Ann Dunnigan, 87, American actress and teacher.
- Leon Edel, 89, American literary critic and biographer.
- Polly Lada-Mocarski, 94, American rare book scholar, educator, and bookbinder.
- Manuel Martin, 79, American soccer player-coach and Olympian (1948).
- Andrej Prean Nagy, 76, Romanian-Hungarian football player and coach.
- Fred Rubi, 70, Swiss Olympic alpine skier (1952).
- Eddie Little Sky, 71, Native American actor, lung cancer.
- Sir Georg Solti, 84, Hungarian conductor, heart attack.
- Mother Teresa, 87, Albanian missionary and humanitarian, recipient of the Nobel Peace Prize, heart failure.

=== 6 ===
- Salvador Artigas, 84, Spanish football player and manager.
- Edward Dumbauld, 91, American district judge (United States District Court for the Western District of Pennsylvania).
- Edward H. Hurst, 80, United States Marine Corps officer.
- Roy Huskey, Jr., 40, American upright bass player, lung cancer.
- Mary Lawson, 73, American baseball player.
- P. H. Newby, 79, English novelist.
- H. W. L. Poonja, Indian sage and jivanmukta, pneumonia.
- Refik Resmja, 66, Albanian footballer.
- Jean-Pierre Sudre, 75, French photographer.
- Uglješa Uzelac, 59, Bosnian politician and diplomat.

=== 7 ===
- Abdullah al-Tariki, 78, Saudi politician and government official, heart attack.
- Mukul S. Anand, 45, Indian film director and producer, heart attack.
- Edwin Brock, 69, British poet.
- Elisabeth Brooks, 46, Canadian actress (The Howling), brain cancer.
- John Carden, 66, English-born American Olympic soccer player (1956).
- Connie Clausen, 74, American actress, author, and literary agent, stroke.
- George W. Crockett, Jr., 88, African-American attorney, jurist, and congressman.
- Héctor Espino, 58, Mexican baseball player and manager.
- Mark Holtz, 51, American sportscaster, leukemia.
- Edgar Kaplan, 72, American bridge player, cancer.
- Mobutu Sese Seko, 66, Congolese politician and president of Zaire, prostate cancer.
- Bill Strannigan, 78, American basketball coach.
- Brian Whittaker, 40, Scottish football player.

=== 8 ===
- Marie Bedford, 90, South African Olympic swimmer (1928).
- René Bihel, 81, French football player.
- Yu Jim-yuen, 92, Chinese opera singer and actor, heart attack.
- Sabatino Moscati, 74, Italian archaeologist and linguist.
- Helen Shaw, 100, American actress.
- Vladimír Sommer, 76, Czech composer.
- Derek Taylor, 65, English journalist, writer and record producer, throat cancer.

=== 9 ===
- Richie Ashburn, 70, American baseball player and broadcaster (Philadelphia Phillies) and member of the MLB Hall of Fame, heart attack.
- Alvaro Banchi, 72, Italian Olympic rower (1956).
- Dick Beckner, 69, American gymnast and Olympian (1956).
- Rowland George, 92, British rower and Olympian (1932).
- John Hackett, 86, Australian-born British army general and painter.
- Predrag Laković, 68, Yugoslavian/Serbian actor.
- Walt Lautenbach, 74, American basketball player (Sheboygan Red Skins).
- Alexandru Mari, 77, Romanian footballer.
- Burgess Meredith, 89, American actor (Rocky, Batman, The Day of the Locust), Emmy winner (1977), melanoma.

=== 10 ===
- Satish Chandra Agarwal, Indian politician.
- Abraham Akaka, 80, American clergyman.
- Richard Brandt, 86, American philosopher.
- Mollie Dive, 84, Australian cricketer and scientist.
- Jacques Leguerney, 90, French composer.
- Kurt Loserth, 82, Austrian Olympic bobsledder (1952, 1956).
- George Schaefer, 76, American television and theatre director.
- Fritz Von Erich, 68, American professional wrestler, cancer.

=== 11 ===
- Fernando Ayala, 77, Argentine film director, screenwriter and producer.
- Mel Groomes, 70, American football player (Detroit Lions).
- Camille Henry, 64, Canadian ice hockey player (New York Rangers, Chicago Black Hawks, St. Louis Blues).
- Iliya Kirchev, 64, Bulgarian football player and Olympian (1956, 1960).
- Matrika Prasad Koirala, 85, Prime Minister of Nepal.
- Hugo B. Margáin, 84, Mexican economist, politician and diplomat.
- Anatoli Polosin, 62, Russian football coach.
- Margaret Scrivener, 75, Canadian politician
- Xhevdet Shaqiri, 74, Albanian football player and coach.
- Hannah Weiner, 68, American poet.

=== 12 ===
- Stig Anderson, 66, Swedish music manager and publisher, heart attack.
- Leslie E. Brown, 77, United States Marine Corps aviator.
- Elsa De Giorgi, 82, Italian actress and writer.
- Leonard Maguire, 73, Scottish actor.
- Judith Merril, 74, American-Canadian science fiction writer.
- Eddie O'Toole, 76, American Olympic long-distance runner (1948), heart attack.
- Georges Valade, 75, Canadian politician, member of the House of Commons of Canada (1958-1972).
- Heorhiy Zhylin, 72, Ukrainian rower and Olympian (1952, 1956).

=== 13 ===
- Anjaan, 67, Indian lyricist.
- Paul Brechler, 86, American athletic director (University of Iowa).
- Roger O. Egeberg, 94, American medical educator and administrator.
- Roger Frey, 84, French politician.
- Georges Guétary, 82, French singer, dancer and actor, heart attack.
- Kauko Helovirta, 72, Finnish film actor.
- Giorgos Mitsibonas, 34, Greek football player, traffic collision.
- Agnete Olsen, 87, Danish Olympic swimmer (1924, 1928).
- Margo Rose, 94, American puppeteer.
- Donald Schön, 66, American philosopher and professor in urban planning.
- Victor Szebehely, 76, Hungarian-American physicist.
- Myra Tanner Weiss, 80, American trotskyist politician.

=== 14 ===
- Basri Dirimlili, 68, Turkish football player and Olympian (1952).
- Andrew Fountaine, 78, British far right activist.
- C. Warren Hollister, 66, American author and historian.
- Clyde Johnson, 80, American football player (Los Angeles Rams, Los Angeles Dons).
- Donato Piazza, 67, Italian racing cyclist.

=== 15 ===
- Aleksanteri Ahola-Valo, 97, Finnish artist and architect.
- Angel Balevski, 87, Bulgarian inventor and engineer.
- Bulldog Brower, 63, American professional wrestler, complications from hip surgery.
- Edna Mae Harris, 82, American actress and singer, heart attack.
- Jim Kekeris, 73, American football player (Philadelphia Eagles, Green Bay Packers).
- Thomas J. Parmley, 99, American physicist.
- Hubert Petschnigg, 83, Austrian architect.
- Gertrude Pitzinger, 93, German contralto.

=== 16 ===
- Barbara Cage, 55, Australian Olympic gymanst (1964).
- Terence Cooper, 64, British film actor.
- James Milton Ham, 76, Canadian engineer and university official.
- Helen Jepson, 92, American lyric soprano.
- William N. Oatis, 83, American journalist, Alzheimer's disease.
- Fred Robertson, 85, British-born Canadian ice hockey player (Toronto Maple Leafs, Detroit Red Wings).
- Dušan Škvarenina, 57, Slovak Olympic cyclist (1960).
- Gerry Turpin, 72, English cinematographer.
- José Valle, 77, Argentine football player and coach.

=== 17 ===
- Benjamin Atkins, 29, American serial killer and rapist, AIDS-related complications.
- Anthony Franchini, 99, American guitarist.
- Nelson G. Gross, 65, American politician, slashed and bludgeoned.
- Brian Hall, 59, English actor (Fawlty Towers), cancer.
- Harry Jago, 84, Australian politician.
- Walter Kremershof, 74, German Olympic ice hockey player (1952).
- Meena, 56, Indian actress.
- Trevor Redmond, 70, New Zealand speedway rider.
- Amanoyama Shizuo, 43, Japanese sumo wrestler.
- Red Skelton, 84, American comedian (The Red Skelton Show), pneumonia.
- Jan P. Syse, 66, Prime Minister of Norway (1989–1990), cerebral hemorrhage.

=== 18 ===
- Fernand Fayolle, 93, French racing cyclist.
- Patricia Pulling, 49, American anti-role-playing games activist, lung cancer.
- Walpola Rahula, 90, Sri Lankan Buddhist monk, scholar and writer.
- Yehuda Sha'ari, 77, Israeli politician.
- Ganesh Man Singh, 81, Nepali politician.
- Seigo Tada, 75, Japanese founder of Goju-Ryu Seigokan Karatedo.
- Amos Watson, 71, American baseball player.
- Jimmy Witherspoon, 77, American blues singer, cancer.

=== 19 ===
- Józef Bielawski, 87, Polish Arabist and scholar of Islam.
- Bill Butland, 79, American baseball pitcher (Boston Red Sox).
- Moses ǁGaroëb, 55, Namibian politician and founding member of SWAPO.
- Kathy Keeton, 58, American editor and publisher of Penthouse magazine, complications from surgery.
- Jack May, 75, English actor.
- Rich Mullins, 41, American Christian musician, traffic collision.
- Ambar Roy, 52, Indian cricket player.

=== 20 ===
- Matt Christopher, 80, American children's author.
- Virginia d'Albert-Lake, 87, American French Resistance agent during World War II.
- Kurt Gloor, 54, Swiss film director, screenwriter and producer, suicide.
- Jim Hickey, 76, American baseball player (Boston Braves).
- Anoop Kumar, 71, Indian film actor.
- Nick Traina, 19, American punk band singer, suicide by morphine overdose.

=== 21 ===
- Juan Burgueño, 74, Uruguayan football player.
- Lydia Eberhardt, 84, German Olympic javelin thrower (1936).
- Teuku Muhammad Hasan, 91, Indonesian politician.
- Jennifer Holt, 76, American actress, cancer.
- Maurice Kaufmann, 70, British actor, cancer.
- Sepp Paar, 84, German Olympic wrestler (1936).

=== 22 ===
- Beatrice Aitchison, 89, American mathematician, statistician, and economist.
- Deolindo Bittel, 75, Argentine politician.
- Pedro Carrizo, 76, Uruguayan Olympic boxer (1948).
- William Craig, 68, American author and historian.
- Robert E. Huyser, 73, United States Air Force general.
- Karl Koopman, 77, American zoologist.
- Manabu Mabe, 73, Japanese-Brazilian painter, diabetes.
- Pierre Petit, 77, French cinematographer.
- Ruth Picardie, 33, English journalist and editor, breast cancer.
- Eddie Sawyer, 87, American Major League Baseball scout.
- George Thomas, 1st Viscount Tonypandy, 88, British politician.
- Chiang Wei-kuo, 80, Secretary-General of the National Security Council of the Republic of China (1986–1993), diabetes.
- Anthony Wreford-Brown, 84, English cricketer.
- Shoichi Yokoi, 82, Japanese soldier, heart attack.

=== 23 ===
- Darko Bratina, 55, Italian sociologist, film theorist and politician, heart attack.
- Dolf Brouwers, 85, Dutch comedian, singer, and television actor.
- Shirley Clarke, 77, American filmmaker, stroke.
- Art Dorfman, 89, American football player.
- Dick Flanagan, 70, American gridiron football player (Chicago Bears, Detroit Lions, Pittsburgh Steelers).
- Abe Gibron, 72, American gridiron football player (Cleveland Browns, Philadelphia Eagles, Chicago Bears), and coach.
- Cary Lu, 51, American science writer, cancer.
- Doug Million, 21, American baseball player, asthma.
- Jonas Pipynė, 61, Lithuanian track and field runner, skier, and Olympian (1956).
- Ray Poage, 56, American gridiron football player.
- Lu Sheng, 85, Chinese military officer.
- J.D. Thottan, 75, Indian director of Malayalam language films.
- Pedro de Castro van Dúnem, 55, Angolan politician.
- Torgny Wickman, 86, Swedish screenwriter and film director.

=== 24 ===
- T. Emmet Clarie, 84, American district judge (United States District Court for the District of Connecticut).
- Aobayama Hirotoshi, 47, Japanese sumo wrestler.
- Anton Kehle, 49, German Olympic ice hockey goaltender (1972, 1976), cancer.
- William M. Miley, 99, United States Army officer and a professor.
- Alby Morrison, 88, Australian rules football player and coach.
- Yen Shui-long, 94, Taiwanese painter and sculptor, surgical complications after fall.
- Jai Pal Singh, 67, Indian physician and educator.
- Engalaguppe Seetharamiah Venkataramiah, 72, Chief Justice of India.
- Remy Wagner, 75, Luxembourgish Olympic football player (1948).
- Ernest Will, 84, French archaeologist and professor.

=== 25 ===
- John Ahern, 86, Irish Roman Catholic bishop.
- Hélène Baillargeon, 81, Canadian singer, actor and folklorist.
- Paul Bernard, 68, English television director and production designer.
- Guillermo Díaz, 66, Chilean football player.
- Bill Donovan, 81, American baseball player (Boston Braves).
- Jean Françaix, 85, French musician and composer.
- Juan José Gámez, 58, Costa Rican football player and manager, cardiac arrest.
- Jim Kemmy, 61, Irish politician.
- Viktor Lipsnis, 63, Soviet Ukrainian shot putter and Olympian (1960, 1964).
- George MacDonald, 90, Canadian rower and Olympian (1932, 1936).
- Phonse Marshall, 80, Australian rules footballer.
- Egon Seefehlner, 85, Austrian lawyer and opera director.
- Włodzimierz Śpiewak, 59, Polish footballer.
- Komil Yashin, 87, Soviet and Uzbekistani poet and screenwriter.

=== 26 ===
- Nick Carter, 95, American track and field athlete, coach and Olympian (1928).
- Woody English, 91, American baseball player (Chicago Cubs, Brooklyn Dodgers).
- Richard Geoffrey Gerard, 92, New Zealand politician and cabinet minister.
- Dorothy Kingsley, 87, American screenwriter (Angels in the Outfield, Valley of the Dolls, Seven Brides for Seven Brothers), heart failure.
- Egon Scheibe, 88, German aviation engineer.
- John Schubeck, 61, American television reporter and anchor, kidney and liver failure.
- Samuel W. Taylor, 90, American novelist, scriptwriter, and historian.
- Izzy Weinstock, 84, American football player (Philadelphia Eagles, Pittsburgh Pirates).
- Péter Zsoldos, 67, Hungarian science fiction author.

=== 27 ===
- Bob Evans, 72, American basketball player (Indianapolis Olympians).
- Atilio François, 75, Uruguayan Olympic cyclist (1948, 1952).
- Alex Konikowski, 69, American baseball player (New York Giants).
- Allan MacRae, 95, American Christian theologian.
- Margot Mahler, 52, German actress.
- Adriana Marines, 5, American girl of Mexican descent, shot.
- Jacques Mercanton, 87, French cinematographer.
- Mandali Venkata Krishna Rao, 71, Indian politician.
- Walter Trampler, 82, American violist.

=== 28 ===
- Munir Bashir, 66-67, Iraqi musician, stroke.
- Frank D'Agostino, 63, American gridiron football player (Philadelphia Eagles, New York Titans).
- David Gill, 69, British film historian, preservationist and documentarian, heart attack.
- Connie Grob, 64, American baseball player (Washington Senators).
- Ho Feng-Shan, 96, Chinese diplomat.
- Günther Maul, 88, German ichthyologist and taxidermist.
- Lage Thunberg, 92, Swedish Air Force officer.
- Elfriede Vey, 75, German cyclist.

=== 29 ===
- William Goddard, 84, American engineer and inventor.
- Roy Lichtenstein, 73, American pop artist, pneumonia.
- Georg Nowka, 86, German Olympic sailor (1952, 1956).
- Edith Ballinger Price, 100, American children's author and illustrator.
- Fritz Schär, 71, Swiss cyclist.
- Volodymyr Sterniuk, 90, Ukrainian Greek Catholic archbishop and the acting head of the UGCC (1972–91).
- Aaron D. Wyner, 58, American information theorist.

=== 30 ===
- Al "Jazzbo" Collins, 78, American disc jockey and musician, pancreatic cancer.
- Nobuo Fujita, Japanese pilot and warrant officer during World War II.
- Pierre Granche, 49, French-Canadian sculptor, lung cancer.
- Edward L. Kessel, 93, American biologist.
- Graeme MacDonald, 67, British television producer and executive.
- Don Martin, 77, American basketball player (St. Louis Bombers, Baltimore Bullets).
- Ernst van Heerden, 81, South African poet.
