= Belgium at the 1956 Summer Olympics =

- IOC code: BEL
- NOC: Belgian Olympic Committee

in Melbourne/Stockholm
- Competitors: 51 men and 3 women in 12 sports
- Flag bearer: André Nelis
- Medals Ranked 28th: Gold 0 Silver 2 Bronze 0 Total 2

Summer Olympics appearances (overview)
- 1900; 1904; 1908; 1912; 1920; 1924; 1928; 1932; 1936; 1948; 1952; 1956; 1960; 1964; 1968; 1972; 1976; 1980; 1984; 1988; 1992; 1996; 2000; 2004; 2008; 2012; 2016; 2020; 2024

Other related appearances
- 1906 Intercalated Games

Belgium competed at the 1956 Summer Olympics in Melbourne, Australia and Stockholm, Sweden (equestrian events). 54 competitors, 51 men and 3 women, took part in 37 events in 12 sports.

== Medalists ==
=== Silver ===
- André Nelis — Sailing, Men's Finn Individual Competition
- Joseph Mewis — Wrestling, Men's Freestyle Featherweight

== Athletics ==
Men's Marathon

- Aurèle Vandendriessche — 2:47:18 (→ 24th place)

== Cycling ==
Sprint

- Evrard Godefroid — 10th place

Time trial

- Evrard Godefroid — 1:16.5 (→ 19th place)

Team pursuit

- André Bar
  François De Wagheneire
  Guillaume Van Tongerloo
  Gustaaf De Smet — 5th place

Team road race

- Norbert Verougstraete
  Gustaaf De Smet
  François Vandenbosch — 89 points (→ 7th place)

Individual road race

- Norbert Verougstraete — 5:26:47 (→ 23rd place)
- Gustaaf De Smet — 5:26:47 (→ 24th place)
- François Vandenbosch — 5:38:16 (→ 42nd place)
- François De Wagheneire — did not finish (→ no ranking)

== Fencing ==
Six fencers, all men, represented Belgium in 1956.

Men's foil

- André Verhalle
- Ghislain Delaunois
- François Dehez

Men's team foil

- Jacques Debeur, Ghislain Delaunois, Marcel Van Der Auwera, André Verhalle

Men's épée

- Ghislain Delaunois
- Jacques Debeur
- Roger Achten

Men's team épée

- François Dehez, Roger Achten, Ghislain Delaunois, Marcel Van Der Auwera, Jacques Debeur

Men's sabre

- Marcel Van Der Auwera

== Rowing ==
Belgium had seven male rowers participate in three out of seven rowing events in 1956.

Men's double sculls

- Fernand Steenacker
- Henri Steenacker

Men's coxless pair

- Bob Baetens
- Michel Knuysen

Men's coxed pair

- Livien Ven
- Antoon Ven
- Jos Van Thillo (cox)

== Shooting ==
Two shooters represented Belgium in 1956.

50 m pistol

- Marcel Lafortune

50 m rifle, three positions

- Frans Lafortune

50 m rifle, prone

- Frans Lafortune

== Swimming ==
Men

Athlete	Event	Heat		Semifinal		Final	
Athlete	Event	Time	Rank	Time	Rank	Time	Rank
André Laurent	100 m freestyle	1:00.7	=32	Did not advance			
Gilbert Desmit	200 m breaststroke	2:43.5	9	—N/a		Did not advance	
Louis Kozma	200 m breaststroke	2:48.4	12	—N/a		Did not advance	

Women

Athlete	Event	Heat		Semifinal		Final	
Athlete	Event	Time	Rank	Time	Rank	Time	Rank
Irène Sweyd	100 m freestyle	1:08.9	26	Did not advance			
Colette Goossens	200 m breaststroke	3:00.5	10	—N/a		Did not advance	
Éva Novák-Gerard	200 m breaststroke	3:02.7	11	—N/a		Did not advance	
