= 1957 European Rowing Championships =

- Venue: Wedau Regatta Course
- Location: Duisburg, West Germany
- Dates: 23–25 August 1957 (women) ? August – 1 September 1957 (men)

The 1957 European Rowing Championships were rowing championships held on the Wedau Regatta Course in the city of Duisburg which, at the time, was located in West Germany. Men competed in all seven Olympic boat classes (M1x, M2x, M2-, M2+, M4-, M4+, M8+), and women entered in five boat classes (W1x, W2x, W4x+, W4+, W8+). Many of the men competed two months later at the Olympic Games in Melbourne; women would first be allowed to compete at Olympic level in 1976. Women competed from 23 to 25 August. Men competed the following week.

== Background ==
FISA, the International Rowing Federation, decided at its congress held just prior to the 1955 Championships in Ghent to award the 1956 Championships to Bled, and that the 1957 Championships were to be hosted by Duisburg.

== Medal summary – women's events ==
| Event | Gold | | Silver | | Bronze | |
|---|---|---|---|---|---|---|
| Event | Country & rowers | Time | Country & rowers | Time | Country & rowers | Time |
| W1x | Soviet Union; Emiliya Mukhina | | Austria; Eva Sika | | Hungary; Kornélia Pap | |
| W2x | Soviet Union; Zossia Rakitskaya; Valentina Kalegina | | Romania; Maria Laub; Florica Ghiuzelea | | West Germany; Ingrid Scholz; Ursula Vogt | |
| W4+ | Soviet Union; Tamara Stolyarova; Lidiya Zontova; Irina Kamenkova; Yevgeniya Tsugekekek; Viktoriya Dobrodeeva (cox) | | Romania; Marta Kardos; Iuliana Toganel; Rita Schob; Felicia Urziceanu; Stefania Borisov (cox) | | East Germany; Ursula Brämer; Christa Golbs; Lieselotte Proll; Ingeborg Sasse; Helga Groh (cox) | |
| W4x+ | Soviet Union; Alexandra Kulesova; Inna Lisany; Nina Yegorova; Svetlana Belyakova; Tamara Saretskaya (cox) | | Hungary; Istvánné Granek; Józsefné Raskó; Lászlóné Terelmes; Jánosné Kőszegi; Rudolfné Radványi (cox) | | East Germany; Brigitte Raue; Herta Weissig; Ruth Harre; Johanna Knoll; Johanna Ullrich (cox) | |
| W8+ | Soviet Union; Tamara Stolyarova; Zinaida Trofimova; Vera Rebrova; Nina Korobkova; Zinaida Korotova; Erna Virs; Sinayda Abramkina; Lyudmila Khoykalova; Maria Fomicheva (cox) | | Romania; Maria Bucur; Stela Georgescu; Elsa Oxenfeld; Sonia Balan; Rita Schob; Felicia Urziceanu; Marta Kardos; Iuliana Toganel; Angela Codreanu (cox) | | East Germany; Hannelore Haaker; Gerda Weith; Christl Langner; Hella Schulz; Marianne Falk; Anita Blankenfeld; Ingeborg Peter; Waltraud Dinter; Ursula Gesch (cox) | |

== Medal summary – men's events ==
| Event | Gold | | Silver | | Bronze | |
|---|---|---|---|---|---|---|
| Event | Country & rowers | Time | Country & rowers | Time | Country & rowers | Time |
| M1x | Australia; Stuart Mackenzie | | West Germany; Klaus von Fersen | | Soviet Union; Vyacheslav Ivanov | |
| M2x | Soviet Union; Aleksandr Berkutov; Yuriy Tyukalov | | West Germany; Thomas Schneider; Friedrich-Wilhelm Sidow | | Belgium; Henri Steenacker; Gérard Higny | |
| M2- | Great Britain; Christopher Davidge; Tony Leadley | | Austria; Alfred Sageder; Josef Kloimstein | | Romania; Radu Nicolae; Stefan Kureska | |
| M2+ | West Germany; Karl-Heinrich von Groddeck; Horst Arndt; Rainer Borkowsky (cox) | | Soviet Union; Heorhiy Zhylin; Ihor Yemchuk; Vladimir Petrov (cox) | | Poland; Zbigniew Schwarzer; Henryk Jagodziński; Bertold Mainka (cox) | |
| M4- | West Germany; Willi Montag; Horst Stobbe; Gunther Kaschlun; Christian Stevens | | Soviet Union; Vladimir Nosenko; Fodor Dzhusefovich; Alexander Bolotin; Nikolai Skreba | | Romania; Carol Kiss; Nicolae Stefan; Radu Nicolae; Ştefan Pongratz | |
| M4+ | East Germany; Gerhard Müller; Egon Meyer; Heinz Dathe; Lothar Wundratsch; Dietmar Domnick (cox) | | Soviet Union; Robert Butow; Yury Suslin; Andrej Archipov; Yuri Sapkov; Oleg Gjemidov (cox) | | Switzerland; Gottfried Kottmann; Michel Buol; Cinto Baggi; Rolf Streuli; Werner Ehrensperger (cox) | |
| M8+ | Italy; Franco Trincavelli; Alberto Winkler; Attilio Cantoni; Romano Sgheiz; Giovanni Zucchi; Abbondio Marcelli; Angelo Vanzin; Ellero Borgnolo; Ivo Stefanoni (cox) | | Soviet Union; Boris Fyodorov; Georgy Gushchenko; Anatoly Antonov; Yury Popov; Yaroslav Cherstvy; Yury Rogozov; Georgiy Bryulgart; Oleg Vasilyev; Yuri Polyakov (cox) | | Czechoslovakia; Josef Věntus; Jan Švéda; Ctibor Reiskup; Václav Jindra; Josef Švec; Zdeněk Žára; Jan Jindra; Stanislav Lusk; Miroslav Koranda (cox) | |
