= Pocock =

Pocock is a surname, and may refer to:

- Andrew Pocock (born 1955), British High Commissioner to Nigeria
- Barbara Pocock (born 1955), Australian politician
- Bill Pocock (1884–1959), English footballer
- Blair Pocock (born 1971), New Zealand cricketer
- Colin Pocock (born 1972), South African beach volleyball player
- Cyrena Sue Pocock (c. 1896–1964), American operatic contralto
- David Pocock (born 1988), Zimbabwe-born Australian rugby union player and Australian politician
- David Pocock (disambiguation), several other people
- Edward Innes Pocock (1855–1905), Scottish rugby international
- Fiona Pocock (born 1989), English rugby union player
- Sir George Pocock (1706–1792), Royal Navy Admiral
- George Pocock (inventor) (1774–1843), English schoolteacher and inventor
- George Yeomans Pocock (1891–1976), American boat builder and philosopher of rowing
- H. R. S. Pocock (1904–1988), British businessman and author
- Isaac Pocock (1782–1835), English dramatist and painter
- John Pocock (died 1732), British Army general
- John Pocock (cricketer) (1921–2003), English cricketer
- J. G. A. Pocock (1924–2023), British intellectual historian
- Lena Margaret Pocock (1872–1957), British actress
- Lilian Josephine Pocock (1883–1974), English stained glass artist
- Mary Agard Pocock (1886-1977), a South African phycologist
- Nancy Meek Pocock (1910–1998), Canadian activist
- Nicholas Pocock (1740–1821), British artist
- Nicholas Pocock (historian) (1814–1897), English academic and cleric
- Nick Pocock (born 1951), English cricketer
- Pat Pocock (born 1946), English cricketer
- Philip Francis Pocock (1906–1984), Roman Catholic Archbishop of Toronto
- Philip Pocock (born 1954), Canadian artist
- Reginald Innes Pocock (1863–1947), British zoologist, arachnologist and mammalogist
- Stuart Pocock, British medical statistician
- Tim Pocock (born 1985), Australian actor
- Thomas Pocock (clergyman) (1672–1745), English diarist
- Tom Pocock (1925–2007), British naval historian
- William Willmer Pocock (1813–1899), British architect

== See also ==
- Pocock Rowing (disambiguation)
- Pococke
