= Rowing at the 1956 Summer Olympics – Men's coxed pair =

Olympic rowing event

Men's coxed pairs at the Games of the XVI Olympiad
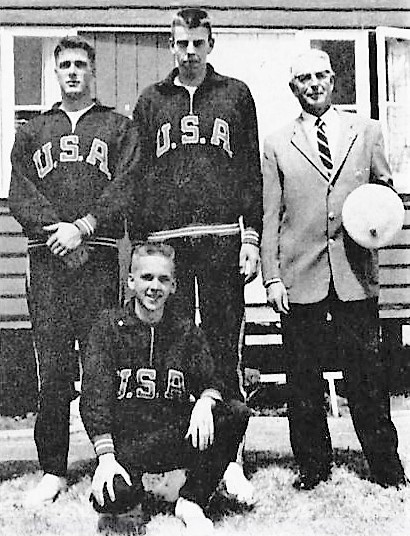
- Gold medal team Arthur Ayrault, Conn Findlay, and Kurt Seiffert with coach George Pocock
- Venue: Lake Wendouree
- Dates: 23–27 November 1956
- Competitors: 24 from 8 nations
- Winning time: 8:26.1

Medalists
1st place, gold medalist(s)		Arthur Ayrault; Conn Findlay; Kurt Seiffert (cox); United States
2nd place, silver medalist(s)		Karl-Heinrich von Groddeck; Horst Arndt; Rainer Borkowsky (cox); United Team of Germany
3rd place, bronze medalist(s)		Ihor Yemchuk; Heorhiy Zhylin; Vladimir Petrov (cox); Soviet Union

The men's coxed pair competition at the 1956 Summer Olympics took place at Lake Wendouree near Ballarat, Australia, from 23 to 27 November. There were 8 boats (24 competitors) from 8 nations, with each nation limited to one boat in the event. The event was won by the American crew, rowers Arthur Ayrault and Conn Findlay and coxswain Kurt Seiffert. It was the first victory in the event for the United States since 1932 and second overall, matching Switzerland for most among nations at that point. The United Team of Germany took silver in its debut (Karl-Heinrich von Groddeck, Horst Arndt, and cox Rainer Borkowsky). The Soviet Union earned its first medal in the event, with Ihor Yemchuk, Heorhiy Zhylin, and Vladimir Petrov (cox) taking bronze.

== Background ==
This was the ninth appearance of the event. Rowing had been on the programme in 1896 but was cancelled due to bad weather. The men's coxed pair was one of the original four events in 1900, but was not held in 1904, 1908, or 1912. It returned to the programme after World War I and was held every Games from 1924 to 1992, when it (along with the men's coxed four) was replaced with the men's lightweight double sculls and men's lightweight coxless four.

None of the 15 competitors from the 1952 coxed pair final returned. Favorite status went to Karl-Heinrich von Groddeck, Horst Arndt, and cox Rainer Borkowsky from the United Team of Germany, the reigning European champions in the event.

Australia, Austria, and Chile each made their debut in the event; East and West Germany competed together as the United Team of Germany for the first time. France missed the event for the first time after eight appearances; the United States had the most appearances among those competing in 1956 with seven.

== Competition format ==
The coxed pair event featured three-person boats, with two rowers and a coxswain. It was a sweep rowing event, with the rowers each having one oar (and thus each rowing on one side). The course used the 2000 metres distance that became the Olympic standard in 1912 (with the exception of 1948).

With fewer boats than in 1952, the competition returned to four rounds: quarterfinals, a repechage, semifinals, and a final. However, the tournament format resulted in all eight boats reaching the semifinals round.

- Quarterfinals: There were 3 quarterfinals, with 2 or 3 boats each. Two boats from each heat (6 boats total) advanced to the semifinals; all other boats (2 boats total) went to the repechage.
- Repechage: There was a single repechage heat, with 2 boats. The top two boats advanced to the semifinals. Thus, no boats were eliminated through the quarterfinals and repechage.
- Semifinals: There were 2 semifinals, each with 4 boats. The winner of each heat (2 boats) advanced to the final.
- Final: A single final, with 4 boats.

== Schedule ==
All times are Australian Eastern Standard Time (UTC+10)

Date	Time	Round
Friday, 23 November 1956	11:45	Quarterfinals
Saturday, 24 November 1956	12:00	Repechage
Monday, 26 November 1956	14:30	Semifinals
Tuesday, 27 November 1956	16:00	Final

== Results ==
The following rowers took part:

=== Quarterfinals ===
==== Quarterfinal 1 ====
Rank	Rowers	Coxswain	Nation	Time	Notes
1	Ihor Yemchuk; Heorhiy Zhylin	Vladimir Petrov	Soviet Union	8:06.6	Q
2	Robert Duncan; Bruce Dickson	John Cockbill	Australia	8:15.9	Q
3	Juan Carmona; Jorge Contreras	Eusebio Ojeda	Chile	8:57.9	R

==== Quarterfinal 2 ====
Rank	Rowers	Coxswain	Nation	Time	Notes
1	Arthur Ayrault; Conn Findlay	Kurt Seiffert	United States	7:42.8	Q
2	Zbigniew Schwarzer; Henryk Jagodziński	Bertold Mainka	Poland	7:43.7	Q
3	Livien Ven; Antoon Ven	Jos Van Thillo	Belgium	8:10.6	R

==== Quarterfinal 3 ====
Rank	Rowers	Coxswain	Nation	Time	Notes
1	Karl-Heinrich von Groddeck; Horst Arndt	Rainer Borkowsky	United Team of Germany	8:03.3	Q
2	Josef Kloimstein; Alfred Sageder	Franz König	Austria	8:11.2	Q

=== Repechage ===
Rank	Rowers	Coxswain	Nation	Time	Notes
1	Livien Ven; Antoon Ven	Jos Van Thillo	Belgium	9:12.7	Q
2	Juan Carmona; Jorge Contreras	Eusebio Ojeda	Chile	10:13.1	Q

=== Semifinals ===
==== Semifinal 1 ====
Rank	Rowers	Coxswain	Nation	Time	Notes
1	Zbigniew Schwarzer; Henryk Jagodziński	Bertold Mainka	Poland	9:22.8	Q
2	Ihor Yemchuk; Heorhiy Zhylin	Vladimir Petrov	Soviet Union	9:26.2	Q
3	Livien Ven; Antoon Ven	Jos Van Thillo	Belgium	9:29.3	
4	Josef Kloimstein; Alfred Sageder	Franz König	Austria	9:29.7	

==== Semifinal 2 ====
Rank	Rowers	Coxswain	Nation	Time	Notes
1	Karl-Heinrich von Groddeck; Horst Arndt	Rainer Borkowsky	United Team of Germany	9:24.1	Q
2	Arthur Ayrault; Conn Findlay	Kurt Seiffert	United States	9:25.1	Q
3	Robert Duncan; Bruce Dickson	John Cockbill	Australia	9:37.7	
4	Juan Carmona; Jorge Contreras	Eusebio Ojeda	Chile	11:03.6	

=== Final ===
Rank	Rowers	Coxswain	Nation	Time
1st place, gold medalist(s)	Arthur Ayrault; Conn Findlay	Kurt Seiffert	United States	8:26.1
2nd place, silver medalist(s)	Karl-Heinrich von Groddeck; Horst Arndt	Rainer Borkowsky	United Team of Germany	8:29.2
3rd place, bronze medalist(s)	Ihor Yemchuk; Heorhiy Zhylin	Vladimir Petrov	Soviet Union	8:31.0
4	Zbigniew Schwarzer; Henryk Jagodziński	Bertold Mainka	Poland	8:31.5

== Results summary ==
Rank	Rowers	Coxswain	Nation	Quarterfinals	Repechage	Semifinals	Final
1st place, gold medalist(s)	Arthur Ayrault; Conn Findlay	Kurt Seiffert	United States	7:42.8	Bye	9:25.1	8:26.1
2nd place, silver medalist(s)	Karl-Heinrich von Groddeck; Horst Arndt	Rainer Borkowsky	United Team of Germany	8:03.3	Bye	9:24.1	8:29.2
3rd place, bronze medalist(s)	Ihor Yemchuk; Heorhiy Zhylin	Vladimir Petrov	Soviet Union	8:06.6	Bye	9:26.2	8:31.0
4	Zbigniew Schwarzer; Henryk Jagodziński	Bertold Mainka	Poland	7:43.7	Bye	9:22.8	8:31.5
5	Livien Ven; Antoon Ven	Jos Van Thillo	Belgium	8:10.6	9:12.7	9:29.3	Did not advance
6	Josef Kloimstein; Alfred Sageder	Franz König	Austria	8:11.2	Bye	9:29.7	Did not advance
7	Robert Duncan; Bruce Dickson	John Cockbill	Australia	8:15.9	Bye	9:37.7	Did not advance
8	Juan Carmona; Jorge Contreras	Eusebio Ojeda	Chile	8:57.9	10:13.1	11:03.6	Did not advance
