= Burevestnik (Ukraine) =

Burevestnik (Ukraine) or Burevisnyk (Ukrainian: Буревісник) was the republican affiliation of volunteer sport society Burevestnik in the Ukrainian SSR that existed in 1936 to 1991. Initially the society united workers of state retail industry.

== Description ==
In 1957 to 1987 Burevestnik was an All-Union Volunteer Society associated with students and professors of under-graduate, graduate and post-graduate studies. In 1955 Berevestnik merged with number of other sports societies such as "Iskra", "Trud" (later revived), "Molnia", "Nauka", and "Medik" under its name.

In 1987 the society merged into All-Union Volunteer Sports Society of Trade Unions.

On January 1, 1978 in Ukraine Burevestnik accounted for 386,000 student members.

== Olympic laureates ==
=== 1952 Summer Olympics ===
Athlete	Gold	Silver	Bronze	Total
Viktor Chukarin	4	2	0	6
Heorhiy Zhylin	0	1	0	1
Ihor Yemchuk	0	1	0	1
Totals (3 entries)	4	4	0	8

=== 1956 Summer Olympics ===
Athlete	Gold	Silver	Bronze	Total
Larysa Latynina	4	1	1	6
Viktor Chukarin	3	1	1	5
Boris Shakhlin	2	0	0	2
Yuri Titov	1	1	2	4
Leonid Bartenev	0	1	0	1
Heorhiy Zhylin	0	0	1	1
Ihor Yemchuk	0	0	1	1
Nadezhda Konyayeva	0	0	1	1
Yevgeny Cherepovsky	0	0	1	1
Totals (9 entries)	10	4	8	22

=== 1960 Summer Olympics ===
- Larysa Latynina, Kiev (gymnastics)
- Larysa Latynina, Kiev (gymnastics)
- Larysa Latynina, Kiev (gymnastics)
- Boris Shakhlin, Kiev (gymnastics)
- Boris Shakhlin, Kiev (gymnastics)
- Boris Shakhlin, Kiev (gymnastics)
- Boris Shakhlin, Kiev (gymnastics)
- Larysa Latynina, Kiev (gymnastics)
- Larysa Latynina, Kiev (gymnastics)
- Boris Shakhlin, Kiev (gymnastics)
- Boris Shakhlin, Kiev (gymnastics)
- Yuri Titov, Kiev (gymnastics)
- Yuri Titov, Kiev (gymnastics)
- Leonid Bartenev, Kiev (athletics)
- Larysa Latynina, Kiev (gymnastics)
- Yuri Titov, Kiev (gymnastics)
- Boris Shakhlin, Kiev (gymnastics)

=== 1964 Summer Olympics ===
- Larysa Latynina, Kiev (gymnastics)
- Larysa Latynina, Kiev (gymnastics)
- Boris Shakhlin, Kiev (gymnastics)
- Larysa Latynina, Kiev (gymnastics)
- Larysa Latynina, Kiev (gymnastics)
- Boris Shakhlin, Kiev (gymnastics)
- Boris Shakhlin, Kiev (gymnastics)
- Larysa Latynina, Kiev (gymnastics)
- Larysa Latynina, Kiev (gymnastics)
- Boris Shakhlin, Kiev (gymnastics)
- Yuri Titov, Kiev (gymnastics)
- Yuri Titov, Kiev (gymnastics)

=== 1972 Summer Olympics ===
- Valeriy Borzov, Kiev (athletics)
- Valeriy Borzov, Kiev (athletics)
- Valeriy Borzov, Kiev (athletics)

=== 1976 Summer Olympics ===
- Valeriy Borzov, Kiev (athletics)
- Valeriy Borzov, Kiev (athletics)
