= Stiefel =

Stiefel is a metonymic occupational surname. The name literally means "boot". Notable people with the surname include:

- Anja Stiefel, Swiss retired ice hockey forward
- Arnold Stiefel, American talent manager, film and television producer, and entrepreneur
- Eduard Stiefel (1909–1978), Swiss mathematician
- Ernst C. Stiefel (1907–1997), German-American jurist
- Ethan Stiefel (born 1973), American ballet dancer
- Frank Stiefel, American filmmaker and photographer
- Jürgen Stiefel (born 1953), German water polo player
- Moritz Stiefel, lead male role in the 1891 play and 2006 Spring Awakening (musical).
