= William Goddard =

William or Bill Goddard may refer to:

- William Henry Goddard (1795–1872), English merchant in Gambia
- William Goddard (engineer) (1913–1997), American engineer for IBM and inventor
- William Andrew Goddard III (born 1937), American professor of chemistry at the California Institute of Technology
- William Goddard (publisher) (1740–1817), American patriot and printer
- Bill Goddard (footballer) (1880–1939), Australian rules footballer
