= Dan Ayrault =

American rower (1935–1990)

Medal record

Men's rowing

Representing the United States

Olympic Games
Gold medal – first place	1956 Melbourne	Coxed pair
Gold medal – first place	1960 Rome	Coxless four

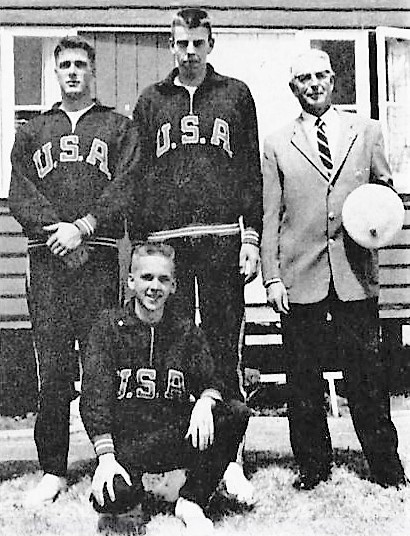
1956 U.S. Olympic champions in the coxed pairs. Left to right, standing: Dan Ayrault, Conn Findlay and coach George Yeomans Pocock, sitting Kurt Seiffert.

Arthur Delancey "Dan" Ayrault Jr. (January 21, 1935 – February 24, 1990) was an American competitive rower and two-time Olympic gold medalist. While competing at the 1956 Summer Olympics in Melbourne, Australia, Ayrault won a gold medal in coxed pair with Conn Findlay and Kurt Seiffert. During the 1960 Summer Olympics in Rome, Italy, he earned a gold medal in coxless four. Ayrault's teammates were Ted Nash, John Sayre, and Rusty Wailes.

== Early life and education ==
Ayrault was born in Long Beach, California, on January 21, 1935. He graduated from the Morristown School (now Morristown-Beard School) in Morristown, New Jersey, in 1952. Morristown-Beard School inducted Ayrault into their Athletics Hall of Fame in 1986. In 1956, he earned his bachelor's degree in philosophy at Stanford University. During his time at Stanford, Ayrault served as captain of the Cardinals' rowing team. Stanford's Department of Athletics later inducted Aryault into the school's Hall of Fame. He completed his master's degree at Harvard University in Cambridge, Massachusetts.

== Teaching career ==
Following his rowing career, Ayrault taught at Lakeside School in Seattle, Washington. After Lakeside School named him as their headmaster in 1969, he served in that role until 1990. In 1971, Ayrault guided the merger of Lakeside School (then an all-boys school) with the all-girls St. Nicholas School. During his 21-year tenure with Lakeside School, Ayrault oversaw funding campaigns to construct Pigott Memorial Library, a field house, and St. Nicholas Hall for Humanities and Arts. Students who attended Lakeside during that period included Bill Gates and Paul Allen, the co-founders of Microsoft Corporation. In 1980, the Washington State Association for Supervision and Curriculum Development awarded Ayrault their Outstanding Educator award.

== Military service ==
Ayrault's father served with the U.S. Navy during World War II. He commanded the USS Tucson, an Atlanta-class light cruiser between July 10 and August 14, 1945. Ayrault later received the Legion of Merit for his service commanding the ship.

== Community service ==
In 1958, Ayrault co-founded the Lake Washington Rowing Club. He then supported the rowing club during the next 32 years. Ayrault served as the president and chairman of the Pacific Science Center between 1980 and 1984. He also served as a member of the board of directors of the Seattle Chamber Music Society and the George Pocock Rowing Foundation. The foundation established their Ayrault Fund in honor of Ayrault. The Ayrault Fund facilitates the foundation's outreach activities to promote the sport of rowing.

== Ayrault Memorial Lecture Series ==
In 1994, friends and family members of Ayrault endowed the Ayrault Memorial Lecture Series at Lakeside School in his honor. Notable speakers at the lecture series have included:

- Bill Gates
- Jacob Lawrence, a painter
- Gwendolyn Knight, a painter
- Dale Chihuly, a glass sculptor
- Fay Jones, an artist
- August Wilson, a playwright
- Sylvia Earle, an oceanographer
- Russ Mittermeier, a primatologist and herpetologist
- Rudy Crew, an educator and administrator
- Margaret Larson, a broadcast journalist with and correspondent with Dateline NBC
- Claude Steele, a social psychologist
- Paul Loeb, an animal trainer and author
- Brian Greene, a physicist
- Speight Jenkins, general director of the Seattle Opera
- David Brooks, an author and columnist for The New York Times
- Po Bronson, a journalist and author
