= Franz König (disambiguation) =

Franz König (1905–2004) was an Austrian Cardinal of the Catholic Church.

Franz König may also refer to:

- Franz König (rowing) (born 1927), Austrian coxswain
- Franz König (surgeon) (1832–1910), German surgeon
- Franz Niklaus König (1765–1832), Swiss painter
