= Thillo (disambiguation) =

Thillo may refer to:

- Saint Thillo (c. 608–702), French priest, abbot and hermit
- Christian Van Thillo (born 1962), Belgian businessman
- Jos Van Thillo (born 1942), Belgian coxswain
