= Buldakov =

Buldakov (Russian: Булдаков) is a Russian masculine surname, its feminine counterpart is Buldakova. It may refer to

- Aleksey Buldakov (1951–2019), Russian film actor
- Igor Buldakov (1930–1979), Russian rower
- Lyudmila Buldakova (1938–2006), Russian volleyball player, wife of Igor
