= Franz König (rowing) =

Austrian rower

Personal information
- Born: 1927
- Died: 1995 (aged 67–68)

Sport
- Sport: Rowing
Medal record
Men's rowing
Representing Austria
European Championships
Bronze medal – third place	1956 Bled	Coxed pair

Franz König (1927 – 1995) was an Austrian coxswain. König competed at the 1956 European Rowing Championships in Bled with Alfred Sageder and Josef Kloimstein in the coxed pair where they won a bronze medal. They then competed at the 1956 Summer Olympics in Melbourne in the same boat class where they were eliminated in the semi-final.
