= Senator Pocock =

Senator Pocock may refer to:

- Barbara Pocock, Greens Senator for South Australia
- David Pocock, independent Senator for the Australian Capital Territory

== See also ==
- Pocock
