= Bruce Dickson =

Bruce Dickson may refer to:

- Bruce Dickson (ice hockey) (1931–2023), Canadian ice hockey player
- Bruce Dickson (rower) (1932–2006), Australian rower
- Bruce Dickson, real identity of the Thin Man (character), a Marvel Comics superhero

== See also ==
- Bruce Dixon, CEO of Vice Media
- Bruce Dixon (died 2019), African-American activist, journalist, and founder of Black Agenda Report
- Bruce Dickinson, lead vocalist of the heavy metal band Iron Maiden
