= Rainer Borkowsky =

German rowing coxswain

Personal information
- Born: 19 October 1942 (age 83) Frankfurt, Germany

Sport
- Sport: Rowing
- Club: RG Wiesbaden-Biebrich 1888
Medal record
Men's rowing
Representing Germany
Olympic Games
Silver medal – second place	1956 Melbourne	Coxed pair
European Rowing Championships
Gold medal – first place	1956 Bled	Coxed pair
Gold medal – first place	1957 Duisburg	Coxed pair

Rainer Borkowsky (born 19 October 1942) is a German rowing coxswain who competed for the United Team of Germany in the 1956 Summer Olympics.

Borkowsky was born in Frankfurt, Germany, in 1942. At the 1956 European Rowing Championships in Bled, Yugoslavia, he won a gold medal in the coxed pair with rowers Karl-Heinrich von Groddeck and Horst Arndt. The same team went to the 1956 Summer Olympics in Melbourne, Australia, where they won the silver medal in this boat class. At the 1957 European Rowing Championships in Duisburg, Germany, they again won a gold medal.
