= Horst Arndt =

German rower (1934–2014)

Personal information
- Born: 19 September 1934 Königsberg, Germany
- Died: 18 October 2014 (aged 80) Taunusstein, Germany

Sport
- Sport: Rowing
- Club: RG Wiesbaden-Biebrich 1888
Medal record
Men's rowing
Representing Germany
Olympic Games
Silver medal – second place	1956 Melbourne	Coxed pair
Representing West Germany
European Rowing Championships
Gold medal – first place	1956 Bled	Coxed pair
Gold medal – first place	1957 Duisburg	Coxed pair

Horst Arndt (19 September 1934 – 18 October 2014) was a West German rower who competed for the United Team of Germany in the 1956 Summer Olympics.

Arndt was born in Königsberg in 1934, which was then part of Prussia and is now located in Russia and known as Kaliningrad. He was a lifelong member of the RG Wiesbaden-Biebrich 1888, a rowing club in Wiesbaden. At the 1956 European Rowing Championships in Bled, Yugoslavia, he won a gold medal in the coxed pair with fellow rower Karl-Heinrich von Groddeck and Rainer Borkowsky as cox. The same team went to the 1956 Summer Olympics in Melbourne, Australia, where they won the silver medal in this boat class. At the 1957 European Rowing Championships in Duisburg, Germany, they again won a gold medal.

Arndt died in 2014 in Taunusstein, Germany.
