= Juan Carmona =

Chilean rower (born 1932)

Personal information
- Nationality: Chilean
- Born: 15 February 1932
- Died: 3 September 2005 (aged 73)

Sport
- Sport: Rowing

Juan Carmona (15 February 1932 – 3 September 2005) was a Chilean rower. He competed in the men's coxed pair event at the 1956 Summer Olympics.
