= Kurt Seiffert =

American rower (born 1935)

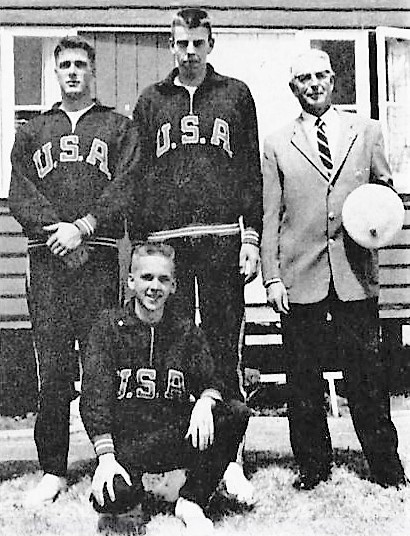
- 1956 U.S. Olympic champions in the coxed pairs. Left to right, standing: Dan Ayrault, Conn Findlay and coach George Yeomans Pocock, sitting Kurt Seiffert.

Personal information
- Full name: Armin Kurt Seiffert
- Born: December 21, 1935 (age 90) Detroit, Michigan, U.S.
Medal record
Men's rowing
Representing the United States
Olympic Games
Gold medal – first place	1956 Melbourne	Coxed pair

Armin Kurt Seiffert (born December 21, 1935) is an American competition rower and Olympic champion.

Born in Detroit, Michigan, he competed at the 1956 Summer Olympics in Melbourne, where he received a gold medal as coxswain in coxed pairs, with Conn Findlay and Arthur Ayrault.
