= Robert Duncan (rower) =

Australian rower

Robert Duncan OAM
Personal information
- Nationality: Australian
- Born: 19 November 1931 (age 94)

Sport
- Sport: Rowing

Robert Bruce Duncan OAM (born 19 November 1931) is an Australian rower. He competed in the men's coxed pair event at the 1956 Summer Olympics.

Duncan was awarded the Medal of the Order of Australia (OAM) in the 2023 Australia Day Honours for "service to rowing". He is the uncle of presenter/actor Jason "Jabba" Davis.
