= Maurizio Clerici =

Italian rower (1929–2019)

Personal information
- Nationality: Italian
- Born: 16 May 1929; Florence, Italy
- Died: 19 February 2019 (aged 89)

Sport
- Sport: Rowing

Maurizio Clerici (16 May 1929 – 19 February 2019) was an Italian rower. He competed in the men's coxless pair event at the 1956 Summer Olympics.
