= Heinz Dathe =

East German rower

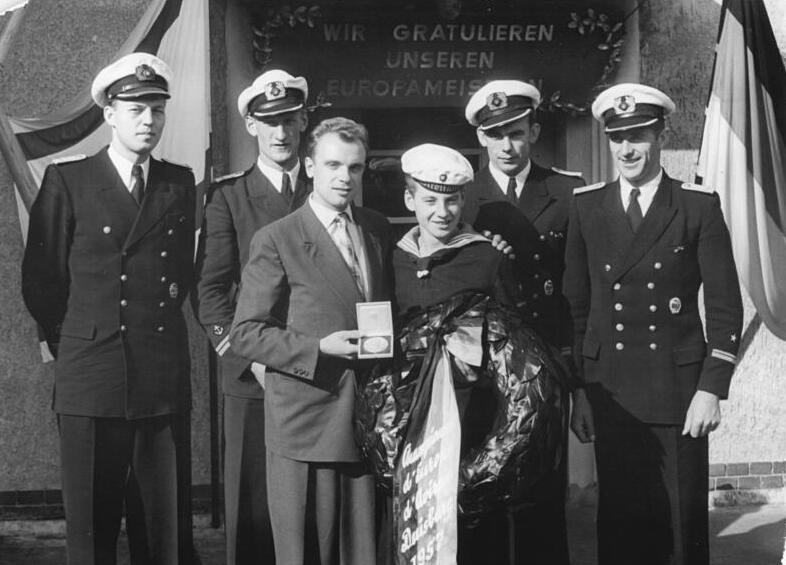
- Wundratsch, Dathe, coach Sternkopf, Domnick, Müller and Meyer in 1957

Sport
- Sport: Rowing
- Club: ASK Vorwärts Berlin
Medal record
Men's rowing
Representing East Germany
European Rowing Championships
Gold medal – first place	1957 Duisburg	Coxed four

Heinz Dathe is a retired East German rower who won the 1957 European Rowing Championships title in coxed four, together with Lothar Wundratsch, Gerhard Müller, Egon Meyer and Dietmar Domnick. The men rowed for ASK Vorwärts Berlin. It was the first time that East Germany had its own team at the European Championships.
