= David Frederick Case =

English audiobook narrator (1932–2005)

David Case

David Frederick Case (25 April 1932 – 1 October 2005), alias Frederick Davidson, was a prolific English narrator of over 700 audiobooks, primarily in the 1980s and 90s when the commercial audiobook industry was maturing. He was one of the first inductees into the "Golden Voice" hall of fame started by the trade publication AudioFile.

== Early life ==
Case was born in London on 25 April 1932, to a father who made tombstones during the Great Depression. As a child he enjoyed mimicking actors and he was later awarded a singing scholarship to St Edward's School, Oxford. After finishing his schooling he trained to be an actor at the Royal Academy of Dramatic Art. He worked with a repertory company in northern England, and made about 13 TV appearances between 1959 and 1964, including as "Bob" on an episode of the BBC show Maigret (1962). His acting career was not overly successful, he played minor and occasional roles.

== Career ==
In 1976, he moved to San Francisco with his companion, Graham Watts. They had a business in Oakland importing antiques. In his spare time, he directed community theater productions, including one show that included British-born actress Wanda McCaddon who became friendly with Case. McCaddon, who was working at Books on Tape at the time, introduced him to the world of audiobook narration, an industry which was coming into maturity during the 1980s. "When he found out I was doing books on tape, he said, 'That sounds like something I'd like to do'", McCaddon remembered.

Sigrid Hecht, co-founder of Books on Tape, was initially skeptical of his breathy interpretations. However Case would excel at British works, recording 13 novels by Anthony Trollope, 36 by P. G. Wodehouse and the entire "Forsyte" chronicles by John Galsworthy. He recorded works by luminaries of British literature such as Charles Dickens, William Makepeace Thackeray, Sir Walter Scott, Thomas Hardy, George Orwell and W. Somerset Maugham. He also performed contemporary British fiction, such as Nick Hornby's High Fidelity. He recorded episodes in a number of popular book series, such as the Rumpole of the Bailey series by John Mortimer, the Inspector Morse series by Colin Dexter, and the Richard Sharpe series by Bernard Cornwell. His non-fiction recordings included William Manchester's biography of Winston Churchill The Last Lion, and Simon Schama's Citizens: A Chronicle of the French Revolution. In addition to British-themed works, Case also was active in recording world classics, including works by Homer, Plato, and Aristotle. His recordings of European literature included Cervantes' Don Quixote, Solzhenitsyn's The Gulag Archipelago, Hugo's Les Miserables, and Tolstoy's War and Peace.

He worked as a freelance artist mostly for Books on Tape and Blackstone Audio during the 1980s and 1990s. Depending on the publisher, he recorded as David Case (Books on Tape), Frederick Davidson (Blackstone), Edward Raleigh, James Nelson, and Ian McKay. Case was a popular narrator, "Readers said, 'Give me anything by Frederick Davidson,'" recalled Lysa Williams of Blackstone Audio. AudioFile editor and founder, Robin Whitten, said Case recorded three times as many books as most other performers. Some listeners found his style off-putting, "the most frequent criticism is that he sounds snooty and that his Continental accents all sound the same — sort of Austro-Hungarian", observed Katherine Powers. But he had fans, The Washington Post obituary by Adam Bernstein said "The English-born, classically trained Mr. Case was among the finest". He was nominated for a Grammy Award and received numerous AudioFile Earphones Awards.

== Death ==
Case, a lifelong smoker, developed throat cancer in 2000 but kept recording, though his output slowed. He refused to stop smoking and doctors were forced to remove his larynx in May 2005, after which he lost his voice entirely. He died at his home in El Sobrante, California on 1 October 2005, unable to utter a sound. Case once said, "I really believe I was born to record audiobooks."
