= James Fifer =

American rower (1930–1986)

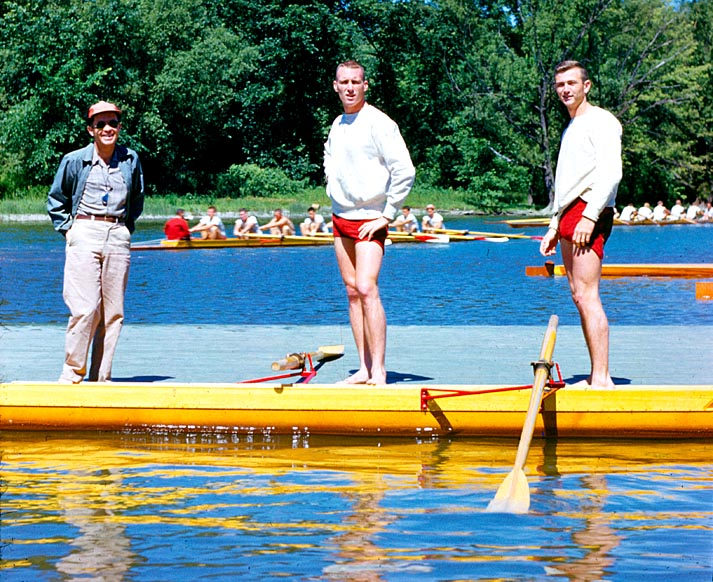
- (left to right) James Beggs, Duvall Hecht, James Fifer
Medal record
Men's rowing
Representing the United States
Olympic Games
Gold medal – first place	1956 Melbourne	Coxless pair

James Fifer (July 14, 1930 – June 7, 1986) was an American competition rower and Olympic champion. He won the gold medal in coxless pair with Duvall Hecht at the 1956 Summer Olympics in Melbourne.
