= Vladimir Petrov (rowing) =

Russian rowing coxswain (born 1932)

Personal information
- Born: Vladimir Viktorovich Petrov; 27 April 1932 (age 94) Moscow, Soviet Union

Sport
- Sport: Rowing
Medal record
Men's rowing
Representing the Soviet Union
Olympic Games
Bronze medal – third place	1956 Melbourne	Coxed pair
European Rowing Championships
Gold medal – first place	1955 Ghent	Eight
Silver medal – second place	1957 Duisburg	Coxed pair

Vladimir Viktorovich Petrov (Russian: Владимир Викторович Петров, born 27 April 1932) is a Russian rowing coxswain who competed for the Soviet Union in the 1956 Summer Olympics.

He was born in Moscow in 1932. In 1956 he coxed the Soviet boat that won the bronze medal in the coxed pair event. He was also the cox of the Soviet boat that was eliminated in the semi-finals of the eight competition.
