= Helmut Sauermilch =

West German rower

Personal information
- Born: 28 April 1933 (age 91); Düsseldorf, Germany

Sport
- Sport: Rowing

Helmut Sauermilch (born 28 April 1933) is a West German rower who represented the United Team of Germany. He competed at the 1956 Summer Olympics in Melbourne with the men's coxless pair where they were eliminated in the semi-final.
