= Johanna Knoll =

German rower

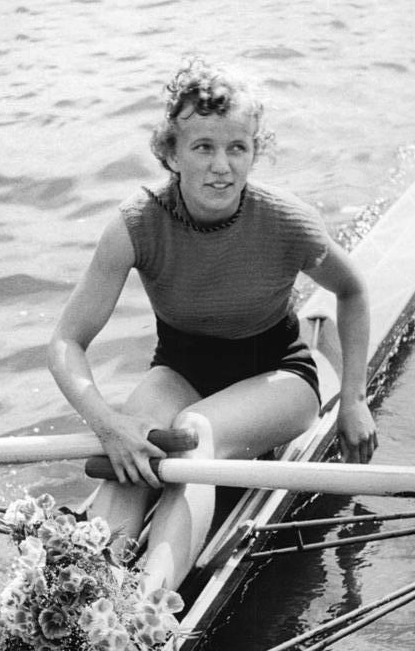
- Johanna Knoll in 1955

Sport
- Sport: Rowing
Medal record
Women's rowing
Representing East Germany
European Rowing Championships
Bronze medal – third place	1957 Duisburg	Quad sculls

Johanna Knoll is a retired German rower who won a bronze medal in the quad sculls at the 1957 European Championships.
