= Pococke =

Pococke is a surname, and may refer to

- Edward Pococke (1604–1691), an English Orientalist and biblical scholar.
- Richard Pococke (1704–1765), an English prelate and anthropologist.

== See also ==
- Pocock
- Pococke Kition inscriptions
