= Peter Raper =

Australian rower

Personal information
- Nationality: Australian
- Born: 22 April 1929
- Died: 23 December 1999 (aged 70)

Sport
- Sport: Rowing

Peter Adrian Raper (22 April 1929 – 23 December 1999) was an Australian rower. He competed in the men's coxless pair event at the 1956 Summer Olympics.
