= Dietmar Domnick =

East German coxswain

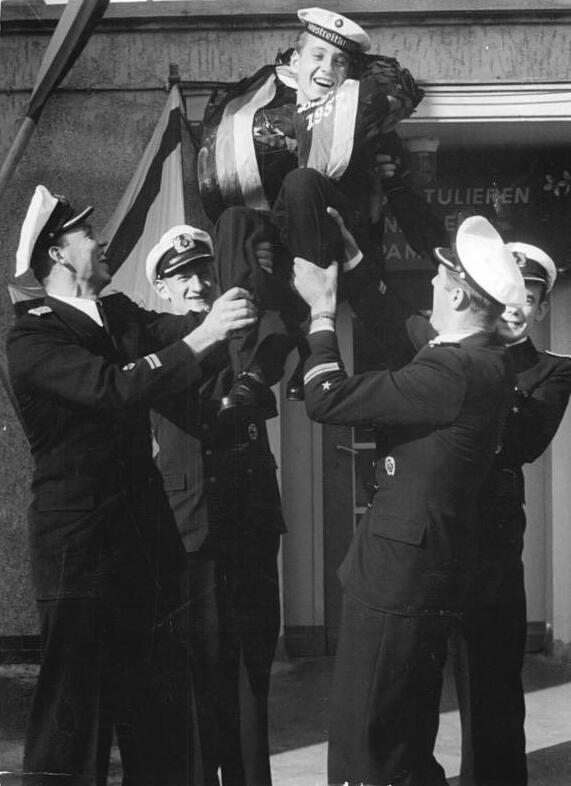
- Domnick (top) in 1957

Sport
- Sport: Rowing
- Club: ASK Vorwärts Berlin
Medal record
Men's rowing
Representing East Germany
European Rowing Championships
| Gold medal – first place | 1957 Duisburg | Coxed four |

Dietmar Domnick is a retired East German coxswain who won the 1957 European Rowing Championships title in coxed four, together with Lothar Wundratsch, Gerhard Müller, Egon Meyer and Heinz Dathe. The men rowed for ASK Vorwärts Berlin. It was the first time that East Germany had its own team at the European Championships.
