= John Cockbill =

Australian rower (1940–2023)

Personal information
- Nationality: Australian
- Born: 16 April 1940
- Died: 26 June 2023 (aged 83)

Sport
- Sport: Rowing

John Cockbill (16 April 1940 – 26 June 2023) was an Australian rower. He competed in the men's coxed pair event at the 1956 Summer Olympics.

Cockbill died on 26 June 2023, at the age of 83.
