= Duvall Hecht =

American rower (1930–2022)

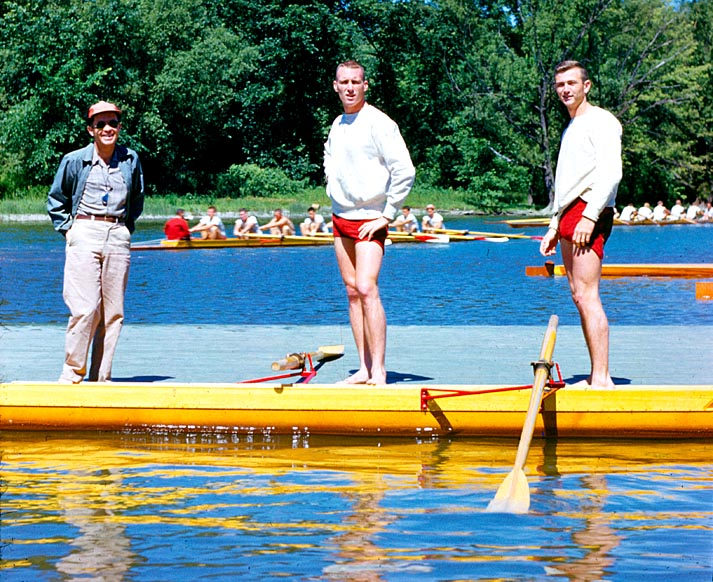
- James Beggs, Duvall Hecht, James Fifer (left to right)

Personal information
- Full name: Duvall Young Hecht
- Born: April 23, 1930 Los Angeles, California, U.S.
- Died: February 10, 2022 (aged 91) Costa Mesa, California, U.S.
Medal record
Men's rowing
Representing the United States
Olympic Games
Gold medal – first place	1956 Melbourne	Coxless pair

Duvall Young Hecht (April 23, 1930 – February 10, 2022) was an American competition rower and Olympic champion.

== Biography ==
Hecht was born in Los Angeles, California. He received a gold medal in the pair without coxswain (with James Fifer) at the 1956 Summer Olympics in Melbourne.

Hecht founded Books on Tape, Inc. in 1975. He had the idea for the service while commuting from his banking job in downtown Los Angeles to his house in Newport Beach, a commute of one hour each way. He later sold the company to Random House.

Before that, he obtained a master's degree in Journalism from Stanford University and was a pilot in the United States Marine Corps. After receiving his master's degree, Hecht went on to teach English at Menlo College in Atherton, California. While at Menlo, Hecht established Menlo's first rowing club where he was head coach until he moved to Southern California.

Hecht established the rowing team at University of California, Irvine in 1965. Later he went on to coach the rowing team of UCLA before coming back to Irvine in the 1990s. Hecht once again returned as the head coach of the men's varsity rowing program at UCI in the fall of 2008. In 1966, he served as president of the SoCal Olympians.

After selling Books on Tape in 2001, he also pursued a career as a long-haul truck driver.

Hecht died at his home in Costa Mesa on February 10, 2022, at the age of 91.
