= Pocock Rowing =

Pocock Rowing may refer to:

- Pocock Racing Shells, a Seattle-based racing shells manufacturer
- Pocock Rowing Center, an amateur rowing club located in Seattle
- The George Pocock Rowing Foundation, a 501(c)(3) non-profit organization located in Seattle
