= Nunton =

Village in Wiltshire, England

Coordinates: 51.034°N 1.776°W

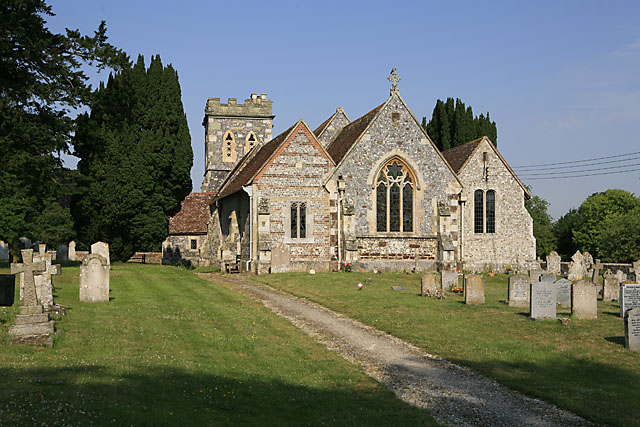
- Church of St Andrew, Nunton

- Location within Wiltshire
- OS grid reference: SU158261
- Civil parish: Odstock
- Unitary authority: Wiltshire
- Ceremonial county: Wiltshire
- Region: South West
- Country: England
- Sovereign state: United Kingdom
- Post town: SALISBURY
- Postcode district: SP5
- Dialling code: 01722
- Police: Wiltshire
- Fire: Dorset and Wiltshire
- Ambulance: South Western
- UK Parliament: Salisbury

Nunton is a small village and former civil parish in Wiltshire, England, about 2.5 miles (4.0 km) south-east of Salisbury, which has been part of Odstock parish since 1934. The former parish included the small village of Bodenham, 0.6 miles (0.97 km) to the east.

Nunton is on the River Ebble, while Bodenham is close to the junction of the Ebble and the Hampshire Avon. The A338 primary route (linking Salisbury with the south coast) separates the two villages.

== Local government ==
Nunton and Bodenham were a tithing of Downton parish. In the 19th century it was deemed to be a separate civil parish, then in 1934 the villages were transferred to Odstock parish.

== Landmarks ==
The Anglican Church of St Andrew at Nunton is Grade II* listed. It has 12th-century origins but was rebuilt in 1854-55 by T.H. Wyatt. There is a window by Christopher Webb. Nunton House, built in around 1720, is also Grade II* listed.

North of Bodenham is the Longford Castle estate, seat of the Pleydell-Bouverie family, Earls of Radnor. There is a 15th-century thatched pub at Nunton, the Radnor Arms.

== Notable people ==
- John Creasey (1908–1973), author, died at New Hall Hospital, Bodenham
- William Henry Goddard (1795–1872), merchant in Gambia, was born at Nunton
