= Viktor Ivanov (rower) =

Soviet rower

Personal information
- Born: Viktor Nikolayevich Ivanov; 21 December 1930 Moscow, Soviet Union
- Died: 14 August 2003 (aged 72)

Sport
- Sport: Rowing
Medal record
Men's rowing
Representing the Soviet Union
Olympic Games
Silver medal – second place	1956 Melbourne	Coxless pair
European Rowing Championships
Gold medal – first place	1953 Copenhagen	Coxless pair
Silver medal – second place	1954 Amsterdam	Coxless pair
Gold medal – first place	1955 Ghent	Coxless pair
Gold medal – first place	1956 Bled	Coxless pair

Viktor Nikolayevich Ivanov (Russian: Виктор Николаевич Иванов, 21 December 1930 – 14 August 2003) was a Russian rower who competed for the Soviet Union in the 1956 Summer Olympics. In 1956 he and his partner Igor Buldakov won the silver medal in the coxless pair event.
