= Eusebio Ojeda =

Chilean rower (1912–1997)

Personal information
- Full name: Eusebio Ojeda Monje
- Nationality: Chilean
- Born: 17 October 1912
- Died: 21 July 1997 (aged 84); Valdivia, Chile

Sport
- Sport: Rowing

Eusebio Ojeda (17 October 1912 – 21 July 1997) was a Chilean rower. He competed, as a coxswain, in the men's coxed pair event at the 1956 Summer Olympics.
