= Jorge Contreras (rower) =

Chilean rower (born 1936)

Personal information
- Nationality: Chilean
- Born: 15 October 1936
- Died: 4 March 2025 (aged 88)

Sport
- Sport: Rowing

Jorge Contreras (15 October 1936 – 4 March 2025) was a Chilean rower. He competed in the men's coxed pair event at the 1956 Summer Olympics.
