= Kjeld Østrøm =

Danish rower (1933–2000)

Personal information
- Born: 8 January 1933 Copenhagen, Denmark
- Died: 6 January 2000 (aged 66)

Sport
- Sport: Rowing
Medal record
Men's rowing
Representing Denmark
European Rowing Championships
Bronze medal – third place	1953 Copenhagen	Coxless pair
Gold medal – first place	1954 Amsterdam	Coxless pair

Kjeld Østrøm (8 January 1933 – 6 January 2000) was a Danish rower. He competed at the 1956 Summer Olympics in Melbourne with the men's coxless pair where they were eliminated in the semi-final. Østrøm died on 6 January 2000, at the age of 66.
