= Conn Findlay =

American rower and sailor (1930–2021)

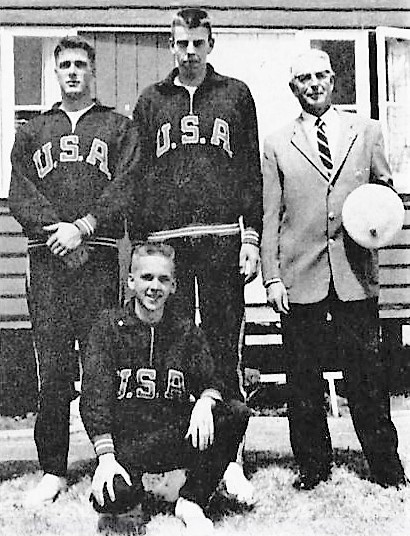
- 1956 U.S. Olympic champions in the coxed pairs. Left to right, standing: Dan Ayrault, Conn Findlay and coach George Yeomans Pocock, sitting Kurt Seiffert.

Personal information
- Full name: Francis Conn Findlay
- Born: April 24, 1930 Stockton, California, U.S.
- Died: April 8, 2021 (aged 90) San Mateo, California, U.S.
Medal record
Representing the United States
Olympic Games
Men's rowing
Gold medal – first place	1956 Melbourne	Coxed pair
Gold medal – first place	1964 Tokyo	Coxed pair
Bronze medal – third place	1960 Rome	Coxed pair
Men's sailing
Bronze medal – third place	1976 Montreal	Tempest class

Francis Conn Findlay (April 24, 1930 – April 8, 2021) was an American Olympic rower and sailor. He won four Olympic medals in those two sports, including two golds in coxed pair. He was also part of the America's Cup sailing crews that won in 1974 and 1977. He is one of 11 sailors to have won both the America's Cup and an Olympic medal.

Findlay started competitive rowing while attending the University of Southern California. He participated in his first Olympic Games in 1956, winning his first gold medal in coxed pair. After finishing third in that discipline at the Olympics four years later, he recaptured gold at the 1964 Summer Olympics. He did not make another Olympic appearance for 12 years until returning in 1976, switching to sailing and securing bronze in Tempest class.

== Early life ==
Findlay was born in Stockton, California, on April 24, 1930. He studied at the University of Southern California, where he rowed on their men's crew during his senior year in 1953–54. He went on to obtain a Master of Business Administration from the University of California, Berkeley.

== Career ==
Findlay first competed as a member of the U.S. Olympic rowing team at the 1956 Summer Games. He won a gold medal in the coxed pair event with Dan Ayrault and Kurt Seiffert of the Stanford Cardinal. Findlay acted as rowing coach of the Stanford freshman team, and was subsequently named its varsity coach in 1959. At the Olympic Games the following year, he finished third in coxed pair. He regained gold in that discipline at the 1964 Summer Olympics in Tokyo. He also won a gold medal in coxed pair at the 1963 Pan American Games, while finishing fifth in that discipline at the World Rowing Championships the year before.

Findlay went on to compete in sailing. After a 12-year hiatus from the Olympics, he returned at the 1976 Summer Games. He crewed for Dennis Conner and won a bronze medal in the Tempest two-man keelboat class. Findlay also acted as a crew leader for the victorious America's Cup teams in 1974 and 1977. He sailed with the yacht Courageous for both events, skippered by Ted Hood and Ted Turner, respectively. As of September 2005, Findlay is one of 11 individuals to win both the America's Cup and an Olympic medal. He is one of only two people to win the America's Cup and an Olympic gold medal in rowing (the other being Joseph Sullivan, who achieved this in 2017).

Findlay's expertise in sailing and physical strength were valued by his fellow crew members on Courageous. His proficiency at trimming sails, coupled with his ability to balance a long way over the water on the trapeze, played a vital role in the Tempest team securing Olympic bronze. He participated in the tumultuous 1979 Fastnet race, which saw 15 yachtsmen die and dozens of ships capsize. Kent Mitchell, his teammate during the 1960 and 1964 Olympics, described Findlay as having "just sailed right through it". Findlay was also a key member of the Windward Passage, the award-winning Maxi Ocean Racer, for 12 years from 1974 until 1986.

== Post-competitive career ==
After retiring from coaching, Findlay operated a business that rented boats. He also umpired regional rowing regattas from time to time. He oversaw the construction of the original Stanford boathouse on the Palo Alto campus.

Findlay was inducted to the National Rowing Hall of Fame on two occasions (1968 and 2000), in recognition of his Olympic gold medal performances in 1964 and 1956, respectively. He was inducted into the Stanford Athletics Hall of Fame in 2005. Two years later, he was honored by USRowing as Man of the Year. He was named to the Pac-12 Men's Rowing All-Century Team in May 2016.

== Personal life ==
Findlay married Luella Anderson when the two were in their 60s. It was his first marriage, and they remained married until her death in 2019. They resided in Northern California during their later years.

Findlay died on April 8, 2021, at a care facility in San Mateo, California. He was 90; the cause of death was unannounced. His younger brother, Bill, died three days later.

== Achievements ==
=== Olympic Games ===
- 1956 – Gold, Rowing, Coxed pair (Dan Ayrault, Conn Findlay, Kurt Seiffert (cox))
- 1960 – Bronze, Rowing, Coxed pair (Conn Findlay, Richard Draeger, Kent Mitchell (cox))
- 1964 – Gold, Rowing, Coxed pair (Edward Ferry, Conn Findlay, Kent Mitchell (cox))
- 1976 – Bronze, Sailing, Tempest Class (Dennis Conner, Conn Findlay)

=== World Championships ===
- 1962 – 5th, Rowing, Coxed pair (Edward Ferry, Conn Findlay, Kent Mitchell (cox))

=== Pan American Games ===
- 1963 – Gold, Rowing, Coxed pair (Edward Ferry, Conn Findlay, Charles Blitzer (cox))
