= Maurice Grace =

Australian rower

Personal information
- Nationality: Australian
- Born: 8 May 1929
- Died: 19 December 2015 (aged 86)

Sport
- Sport: Rowing

Maurice Charles Grace (8 May 1929 – 19 December 2015) was an Australian rower. He competed in the men's coxless pair event at the 1956 Summer Olympics.
