= Books on Tape (company) =

US American audiobook publishing imprint

- Parent company: Penguin Random House
- Founded: 1975
- Founder: Duvall Hecht
- Country of origin: United States
- Headquarters location: New York City, New York
- Publication types: Audiobooks
- Official website: booksontape.com

Books on Tape (sometimes abbreviated BoT) is an audiobook publishing imprint of Random House which emphasizes unabridged audiobook recordings for schools and libraries. It was previously an independent California-based company before its acquisition by Random House, in 2001.

The company was founded by Olympic gold medalist Duvall Hecht in 1975 as a direct to consumer mail order rental service for unabridged audiobooks on cassette tape. It was one of the pioneering companies in the fledgling audiobook business along with Recorded Books.

== See also ==
- David Frederick Case
- Grover Gardner
