= Ingrid Scholz =

German rower

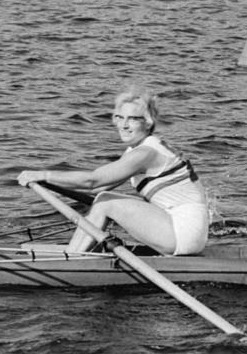
- Ingrid Scholz in 1959

Sport
- Sport: Rowing
- Club: Duisburger RV
Medal record
Representing Germany
European Rowing Championships
Silver medal – second place	1953 Copenhagen	Single sculls
Gold medal – first place	1956 Bled	Single sculls
Bronze medal – third place	1957 Duisburg	Double sculls

Ingrid Scholz is a retired German rower who won a gold, a silver and a bronze medal at the European championships of 1953–1957. Those were the first medals for Germany in female rowing, a sport that was then dominated by the Soviet Union.
