= Antoon Ven =

Belgian rower

Personal information
- Nationality: Belgian
- Born: 21 July 1935 (age 89); Antwerp, Belgium

Sport
- Sport: Rowing

Antoon Ven (born 21 July 1935) is a Belgian rower. He competed in the men's coxed pair event at the 1956 Summer Olympics.
