= Alfred Sageder =

Austrian rower

Personal information
- Born: 29 September 1933 Gramastetten, Austria
- Died: 2017 (aged 83)

Sport
- Sport: Rowing
Medal record
Men's rowing
Representing Austria
Olympic Games
Silver medal – second place	1960 Rome	Coxless pair
Bronze medal – third place	1956 Melbourne	Coxless pair
European Championships
Silver medal – second place	1956 Bled	Coxless pair
Bronze medal – third place	1956 Bled	Coxed pair
Silver medal – second place	1957 Duisburg	Coxless pair
Bronze medal – third place	1959 Mâcon	Coxless pair

Alfred Sageder (29 September 1933 – 2017) was an Austrian rower who competed in the 1956 Summer Olympics, in the 1960 Summer Olympics, and in the 1964 Summer Olympics. He was born in Gramastetten. In 1956 he and his partner Josef Kloimstein won the bronze medal in the coxless pairs event. He also competed with the Austrian boat in the coxed pair competition and was eliminated in the semi-finals. Four years later he won the silver medal with his partner Josef Kloimstein in the coxless pairs event. At the 1964 Games he was part of the Austrian boat which finished eighth in the coxed pair competition.
