= Josef Kloimstein =

Austrian rower (1929–2012)

Personal information
- Born: 1 November 1929 Rufling, Austria
- Died: 15 November 2012 (aged 83) Steyregg, Austria

Sport
- Sport: Rowing
Medal record
Men's rowing
Representing Austria
Olympic Games
Silver medal – second place	1960 Rome	Coxless pair
Bronze medal – third place	1956 Melbourne	Coxless pair
European Championships
Silver medal – second place	1956 Bled	Coxless pair
Bronze medal – third place	1956 Bled	Coxed pair
Silver medal – second place	1957 Duisburg	Coxless pair
Bronze medal – third place	1959 Mâcon	Coxless pair

Josef Kloimstein (1 November 1929 – 15 November 2012) was an Austrian rower who competed in the 1956 Summer Olympics, in the 1960 Summer Olympics, and in the 1964 Summer Olympics.

He was born in Rufling.

In 1956 he and his partner Alfred Sageder won the bronze medal in the coxless pairs event. He also competed with the Austrian boat in the coxed pair competition and was eliminated in the semi-finals.

Four years later he won the silver medal with his partner Alfred Sageder in the coxless pair event.

At the 1964 Games he was part of the Austrian boat which finished eighth in the coxed pair competition.
