= Pocock Racing Shells =

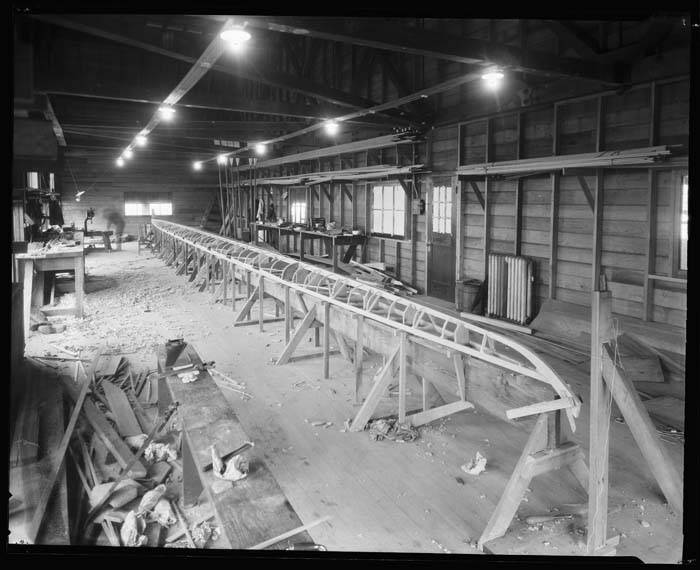
- A Pocock racing shell under construction in the 1920s.
- Founded: Seattle, Washington (1911)
- Founder: George Pocock
- Headquarters: Seattle, United States
- Products: Rowing boats

Pocock Racing Shells is a Seattle, Washington-based racing shells manufacturer, founded in 1911.

== History ==
The roots of the company began in England during the 1800s. Founder George Pocock grew up in England, where his father was the head boat builder for prestigious Eton College at Windsor at the turn of the century. As a young man, George raced single shells on the famed River Thames. At one of these races he won £50. With the money purchased passage for himself and his brother, Dick, on a cattle boat bound for Canada. In 1911, on George's 20th birthday, they arrived in Vancouver, British Columbia, with $20 in their pockets and a dream of building fine racing boats. They were commissioned to build two single sculling boats for the Vancouver Rowing Club’s boathouse, without moorage, and found that at low tide they rested precariously on the mud flats. During the ensuing year, they nearly starved.

That winter, University of Washington rowing coach Hiram Boardman Conibear convinced the brothers to come to Seattle and build boats for the university after hearing about their work in Canada. In 1916 the shell building business was still struggling, and they began building pontoons for William E. Boeing's new airplane company, Boeing. George eventually became foreman of the assembly department, Dick became boatbuilder for Yale University, and their father returned to England.

In 1922 George returned to the University of Washington to build boats again, and in 1923, the unknown Washington rowing team went east and won the national sport rowing championship in a Pocock boat. For the next 50 years George built racing shells for nearly every racing college in the country and several abroad. His reputation spread as he strived to maintain the highest possible quality at a price that even small colleges or high schools could afford. Pocock Racing Shells went on to win many national sport rowing and Olympic championships.

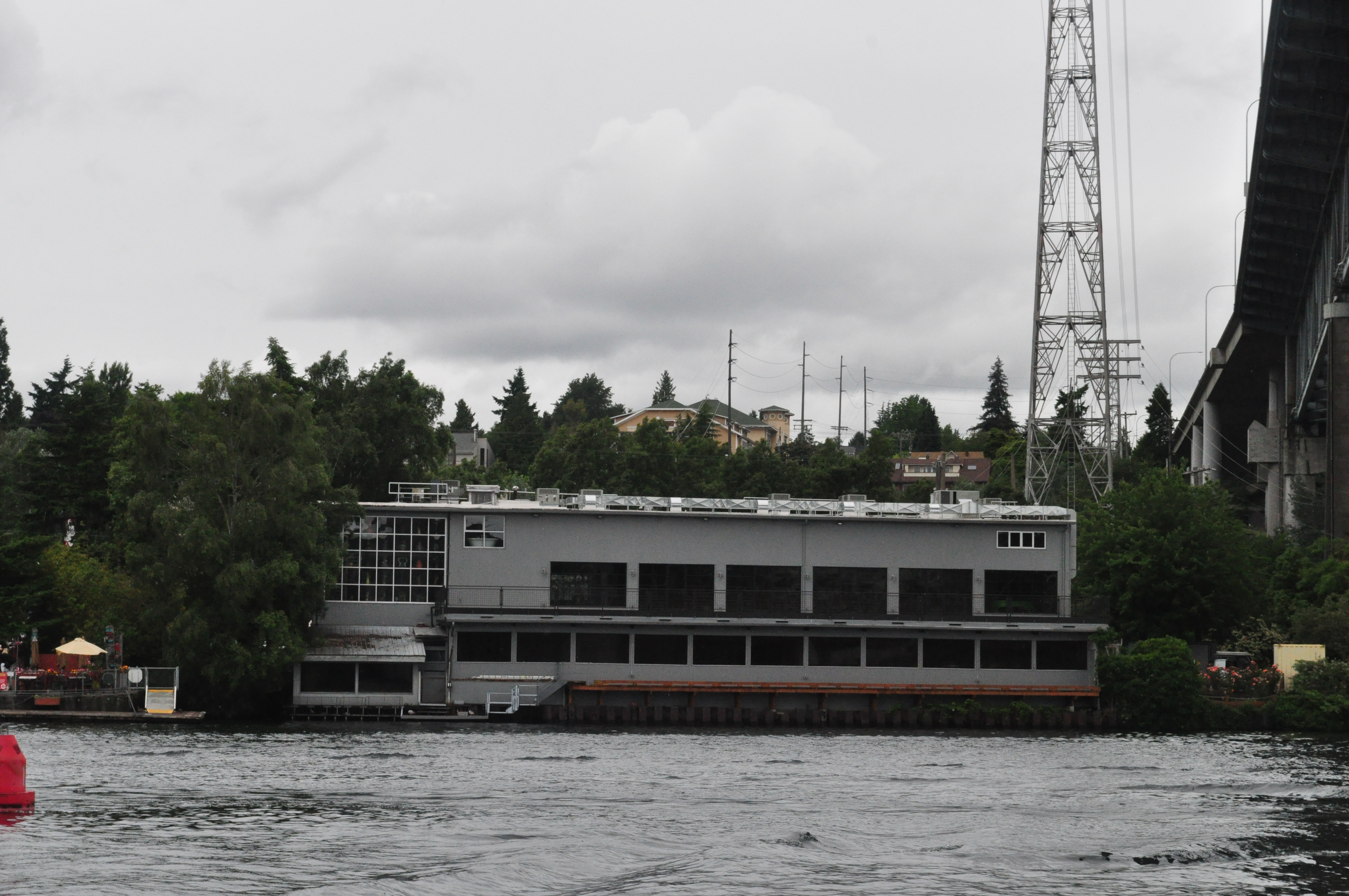
This building on the north shore of Lake Union long housed Pocock Racing Shells' offices and workshop/factory.

Upon George's death in 1976, the Lake Union-based company was taken over by his son, Stan. Stan grew up in Seattle, was an oarsman at the University of Washington and graduated with a degree in engineering. In the late 1960s, management of the company became Stan's responsibility while George devoted himself to constructing cedar single shells.

In addition to his role as a boat builder, Stan also was a successful rowing coach. In addition to coaching at the University of Washington from 1947 to 1955, he was the first coach for Lake Washington Rowing Club upon its formation in 1958, and coached several gold medal-winning crews in the 1956 and 1960 Olympic Games. In 1956 Stan began experimenting with fiberglass construction. In 1961 he built the first ever fiberglass rowing boat—a wherry. By 1979 Stan was running the shop and experimenting with ideas that were ahead of their time. He was first in many areas, including the development of a successful wood and glass laminated composite oar, molded seat tops and adjustable oarlock height spacers. Impressed with innovations in composite engineering from aerospace industries, and adding his own experience to that of the Boeing engineers, he developed the first line of all carbon fiber monocoque racing shells in 1981.

In 1985, Stan passed on the Pocock company ownership to long-time family friend Bill Tytus. Bill met the Pocock family as a child, and became a frequent visitor to the shop. In the late 1960s, he was an avid sculler while pursuing his degrees from the University of Washington and Harvard University. In 1969, he placed second in the Diamond Challenge Sculls event at the Henley Royal Regatta, and was a member of the U.S. National Team from 1969 to 1971. He is still active in the sport, teaming with Frank Cunningham for the past 15 years to coach scullers at Lake Washington Rowing Club.

Bill Tytus is the currently owner and President of Pocock Racing Shells, and oversees the day-to-day operation of the Everett, WA shop. Pocock Racing Shells builds composite racing shells for colleges, clubs, and high schools in North America. In 1998 he introduced the "Hypercarbon" laminate schedule, which is the proprietary construction used in the racing shells that Pocock builds.

== Models ==
- Small Hull xVIII
- Large Hull xVIII
- Hypercarbon V8
- Standard Line E8
- Standard Line C8
- Standard Line M8
- Hypercarbon K4+
- Hypercarbon K4x
- Standard Line K4+
- Standard Line K4x
- Standard Line C4+
- Standard Line R4+
- Hypercarbon K2x/-
- Standard Line K2x/-
- Hypercarbon K1x
- Standard Line K1x

== Rowing Foundation ==
The George Pocock Rowing Foundation is a 501(c)(3) non-profit organization located in Seattle, which is dedicated to perpetuating the legacy and ideals of George Pocock. The foundation functions as a community resource, serving to support and advance the sport of rowing in the Northwest. Its establishment dates back to 1984, and since then, it has been actively engaged in promoting an objective awareness of rowing in the Pacific Northwest through the development of new rowing programs. The foundation provides rowing opportunities for at-risk children and adults in the community while also sponsoring men and women training for the U.S. National Rowing Team in a non-discriminatory manner.
