= Elfriede Vey =

German cyclist (1922–1997)

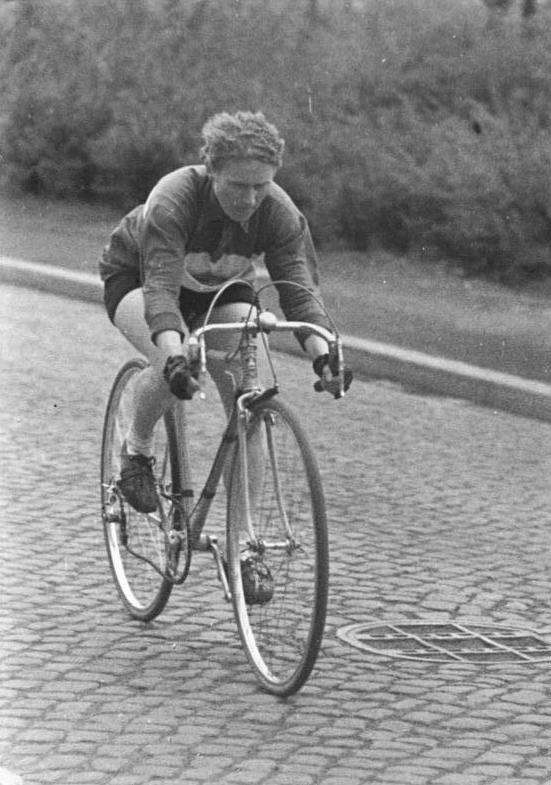
- Elfriede Vey

Personal information
- Full name: Elfriede Anneliese Vey
- Born: Elfriede Anneliese Siegmann; 19 February 1922 Magdeburg
- Died: 28 September 1997 (aged 75) Paderborn

Cycling career
- Sport: Cycling
- Disciplines: Track; Road

Elfriede Vey (19 February 1922 – 28 September 1997) was a German cyclist. Her birth name was Elfriede Anneliese Siegmann.

== Career ==
Elfriede Vey began her athletic amateur career in 1951. In ten years, she participated in 183 track and road races and achieved 131 victories, mostly in road racing, but also in individual pursuit race and the elimination races on the velodrome.

Four times she was DDR best in road cycling:

On 8 July 1953 she set an hour record on the cement track in Heidenau. She drove despite adverse weather conditions in the hour 36,962 km and surpassed with 616 meters the all-Union record of the Soviet athlete A. Subkova. However, since only a coach with national approval authorization was present at the record run, he was recognized only as DDR record. On 29 September 1959 Elfriede Vey improved on the Alfred Rosh fight track their time to 37,561 km.

Elfriede Vey also achieved international success. On her first international start on the Herne Hill cycle track on 20 July 1957 she won over a distance of more than 3,500 meters in single-track pursuit. She took part in the road race in London the following day and took 10th place in a strong field of 35 participants.

At a World Criterium carried out in Leipzig from 17 to 20 September 1957, Elfriede Vey again claimed victory in the 3,000-meter pursuit on the track. In a knockout run over 1,000 meters the day before, she took second place behind the Englishwoman Joan Poole.

The 1958 UCI Road World Championships Elfriede Vey occupied in Reims in a driver's field of 28 participants to 12th place, at the UCI Track Cycling World Championships 1958 in Paris, she reached with the fifth fastest time in the 3,000-meter pursuit driving the quarterfinals.

One of her greatest achievements she scored in the World Championship revenge of women on 15 September 1958 in Roanne over the distance of 78 kilometers.

Due to her sporting successes at home and abroad on 14 August 1958 she was awarded the title of Master of Sports. A year earlier Vey she was made an honorary member of the Women's Cycle Racing Association (WCRA).

At the UCI Road World Championships 1959 Elfriede Vey finished in Belgium despite a fall the 9th place.

The last race Vey competed in was at the UCI Road World Championships 1960 at the Sachsenring. She finished 23rd and then finished her career.
