= John Stanes =

Australian cricketer

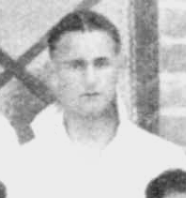

Personal information
- Born: 15 December 1910; Melbourne, Australia
- Died: 2 September 1997 (aged 87); Narrabeen, Australia

Domestic team information
- Years: Team
- 1932-1938: Victoria
- Source: Cricinfo, 22 November 2015

John Stanes (15 December 1910 – 2 September 1997) was an Australian cricketer. He played five first-class cricket matches for Victoria between 1932 and 1938.

== See also ==
- List of Victoria first-class cricketers
