= Phonse Marshall =

Australian rules footballer (1917–1997)

Personal information
- Full name: Frederick George Marshall
- Born: 29 August 1917; Minyip, Victoria
- Died: 25 September 1997 (aged 80); Geelong, Victoria
- Height: 175 cm (5 ft 9 in)
- Weight: 69 kg (152 lb)

Playing career^{1}
Years	Club	Games (Goals)
1944	Geelong	3 (1)
- ^{1} Playing statistics correct to the end of 1944.

Phonse Marshall (29 August 1917 – 25 September 1997) was an Australian rules footballer who played with Geelong in the Victorian Football League (VFL).

Marshall was granted a permit to play with South Melbourne in 1943 but did not play a senior game for them and returned to Geelong for the 1944 season.
