= Rowing at the 1956 Summer Olympics – Men's coxless pair =

Men's coxless pairs at the Games of the XVI Olympiad
- Venue: Lake Wendouree
- Date: November 23–27, 1956
- Competitors: 18 from 9 nations

Medalists
1st place, gold medalist(s)		James Fifer; Duvall Hecht	United States
2nd place, silver medalist(s)		Igor Buldakov; Viktor Ivanov	Soviet Union
3rd place, bronze medalist(s)		Josef Kloimstein; Alfred Sageder	Austria

The men's coxless pairs competition at the 1956 Summer Olympics took place at Lake Wendouree near Ballarat, Australia. The event was held from 23 November 23 to 27 November. The competition was won by James Fifer and Duvall Hecht representing the United States.

== Heats ==
In the heats the first two pairs advanced directly to semi-finals. The others competed in the repechage for the remaining spots in the semi-finals.

=== Heat 1 ===
Rank	Athlete name	Country	Time	Notes
1	Reg Douglas; Bob Parker	New Zealand	7:32.6	SF
2	Peter Raper; Maurice Grace	Australia	7:37.2	SF
3	Alvaro Banchi; Maurizio Clerici	Italy	7:41.2	

=== Heat 2 ===
Rank	Athlete name	Country	Time	Notes
1	Helmut Sauermilch; Claus Heß	United Team of Germany	7:30.1	SF
2	Finn Pedersen; Kjeld Østrøm	Denmark	7:36.6	SF
3	Bob Baetens; Michel Knuysen	Belgium	7:45.6	

=== Heat 3 ===
Rank	Athlete name	Country	Time	Notes
1	James Fifer; Duvall Hecht	United States	7:19.5	SF
2	Igor Buldakov; Viktor Ivanov	Soviet Union	7:29.9	SF
3	Josef Kloimstein; Alfred Sageder	Austria	7:37.0	

== Repechage ==
The first two pairs advanced directly to semi-finals.

=== Heat 1 ===
Rank	Athlete name	Country	Time	Notes
1	Josef Kloimstein; Alfred Sageder	Austria		SF
2	Alvaro Banchi; Maurizio Clerici	Italy		SF
3	Bob Baetens; Michel Knuysen	Belgium		

== Semi-finals ==
The first two pairs advanced directly to the final.

=== Heat 1 ===
Rank	Athlete name	Country	Time	Notes
1	Igor Buldakov; Viktor Ivanov	Soviet Union	8:41.3	F
2	Josef Kloimstein; Alfred Sageder	Austria	8:42.4	F
3	Reg Douglas; Bob Parker	New Zealand	8:44.7	
4	Finn Pedersen; Kjeld Østrøm	Denmark	8:55.1	

=== Heat 2 ===
Rank	Athlete name	Country	Time	Notes
1	James Fifer; Duvall Hecht	United States	8:37.7	F
2	Peter Raper; Maurice Grace	Australia	8:48.2	F
3	Helmut Sauermilch; Claus Heß	United Team of Germany	8:52.3	
4	Alvaro Banchi; Maurizio Clerici	Italy	9:11.1	

== Final ==
Rank	Athlete name	Country	Time	Notes
1st place, gold medalist(s)	James Fifer; Duvall Hecht	United States	7:55.4	
2nd place, silver medalist(s)	Igor Buldakov; Viktor Ivanov	Soviet Union	8:03.9	
3rd place, bronze medalist(s)	Josef Kloimstein; Alfred Sageder	Austria	8:11.8	
4	Peter Raper; Maurice Grace	Australia	8:22.2	
