= Michel Knuysen =

Belgian rower

Personal information
- Born: Michel Jules Lodewijk Knuysen; 25 October 1929 Wijnegem
- Died: 6 May 2013 (aged 83)

Sport
- Sport: Rowing
Medal record
Men's rowing
Representing Belgium
Olympic Games
Silver medal – second place	1952 Helsinki	Coxless pair
European Rowing Championships
Gold medal – first place	1951 Mâcon	Coxless pair
Silver medal – second place	1953 Copenhagen	Coxless pair
Silver medal – second place	1955 Ghent	Coxless pair
Bronze medal – third place	1956 Bled	Coxless pair

Michel Jules Lodewijk Knuysen (25 October 1929 – 6 May 2013) was a Belgian rower who competed in the 1952 Summer Olympics and in the 1956 Summer Olympics. He was born in Wijnegem. In 1952 he won the silver medal with his partner Bob Baetens in the coxless pairs event. Four years later he was eliminated with his partner Bob Baetens in the repêchage of the coxless pair competition.
