= William Henry Goddard =

English merchant

William Henry Goddard (6 February 1795 – 16 December 1872) was an English merchant who traded in the Gambia in the early 19th century.

Goddard was born in Nunton, Wiltshire, and was a teenager when he first arrived in Gambia. He married a local woman, Ellen Casteign (or Castaign), and they had two daughters. From 1819 they lived in the town of Bathurst (now Banjul), where Goddard and another British trader, Charles Grant, had a timber export business. Goddard and Grant were among the first British settlers in the country. Goddard was a member of the Legislative Council from 1843, and in 1860 he set up the Gambia Trading Company. His nephews, William and Alfred, came to Gambia to work for him.

In 1862, Goddard retired to Britain; he died, aged 77, in 1872 in Hampstead. His nephew William took over the company after his death.
