= Alvaro Banchi =

Italian rower

Personal information
- Nationality: Italian
- Born: 23 April 1925
- Died: 9 September 1997 (aged 72)

Sport
- Sport: Rowing

Alvaro Banchi (23 April 1925 – 9 September 1997) was an Italian rower. He competed in the men's coxless pair event at the 1956 Summer Olympics.
