= Norbert Verougstraete =

Belgian cyclist

Personal information
- Born: 16 December 1934 Kortrijk, Belgium
- Died: 17 February 2016 (aged 81)

Cycling career
- Sport: Cycling

Norbert Verougstraete (born 16 December 1934 – 17 February 2016) was a Belgian cyclist. He competed in the individual and team road race events at the 1956 Summer Olympics.
