= François De Wagheneire =

Belgian cyclist

Personal information
- Born: 19 September 1937 Ghent, Belgium
- Died: September 2015 (aged 77–78)

Cycling career
- Sport: Cycling

François De Wagheneire (19 September 1937 – September 2015) was a Belgian cyclist. He competed in three events at the 1956 Summer Olympics.
