= Paul Loeb =

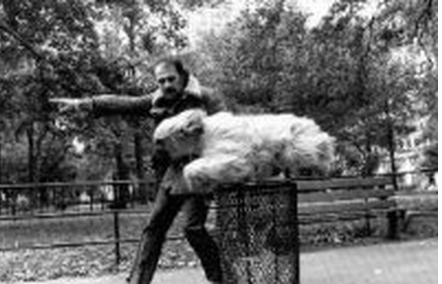
- Occupation: Animal Trainer / Author

Paul Loeb is an American animal trainer and author of animal behavior and training books.

== Early career ==
Loeb's first practice, Paul Loeb's Animal Analysis (1958–1962), was an at-home problem-solving program. This was followed by The Loeb Animal Institute (1962-1984), an international animal behavior clinic.

Loeb studied the behavior of both wild and domestic animals, focusing on how they either avoided or pursued contact with human beings to their advantage. This eventually led to the formulation of his "Magic Touch" theory of animal training, which is described in Paul Loeb's Complete Book of Dog Training. Early on, Loeb thought a holistic approach when working with animals was necessary, including diet and nutrition. Because of his working knowledge of this, Gaines, a division of General Foods, hired Loeb as a consultant in the early development of their Cycle dog food.

== Recognition ==
The Wall Street Journal compared Paul Loeb's work with animals to the works of psychologist B. F. Skinner: "Loeb illustrates practical approaches to physical needs as a means to psychological (read "behavioral") cures. He is to the canine world what B.F. Skinner, the noted Harvard psychologist who devoted himself to the techniques of shaping behavior, was to the study of man."

In 1975, the Chicago Tribune wrote: "His credits include more than 600 TV commercials, ranging from pet foods to men's underwear. He also cured 8,000 family pets of such bad habits as biting, drooling, wetting, chewing, wandering, and intimidation."

His work regarding diet, nutrition, and exercise has also been covered by the Reading Eagle, The Christian Science Monitor, The Charleston News and Courier, New York Daily News, and the Chicago Tribune.

== Writing and media appearances ==
Loeb's first book Paul Loeb's Complete Book of Dog Training, was selected as the best book of 1974 by the Dog Writer's Association of America.

Loeb's book You can train your cat (1977) was translated into many languages. This was followed by Cathletics: Ways to amuse and exercise your cat (1981).

Loeb also wrote a column for Parents magazine during the early eighties, dealing with topics concerning pet behavior and having pets in a household with children. He appeared on his first national talk show, The Mike Douglas Show, in 1973, was also a guest on Johnny Carson's Tonight Show in 1975, ABC's Good Morning America in 1979, Dateline NBC in 1998, and WNEW Midday in 1977.

== Books ==
- Loeb, Paul (1974), Paul Loeb's Complete Book of Dog Training, Prentice-Hall, ISBN 978-0136545330
- Loeb, Paul; Loeb, Jo (1977), You can train your cat, Simon and Schuster, ISBN 978-0-671-25147-5
- Loeb, Paul (1980), Supertraining your dog, Prentice Hall, ISBN 978-0-13-876730-3
- Banks, Josephine; Loeb, Paul (1981), Cathletics: Ways to amuse and exercise your cat, Castle, ISBN 978-0-13-121004-2
- Loeb, Paul (1984), Nutrition and your dog, Pocket Books, ASIN B003WZQ5M2
- Loeb, Paul; Hlavacek, Suzanne (1997), Smarter Than You Think: A Revolutionary Approach to Teaching and Understanding Your Dog in Just a Few Hours, Pocket Books Div. of Simon & Schuster, ISBN 978-0-671-00172-8
- Loeb, Paul; Hlavacek, Suzanne (1999), The Heart of the Matter: Breaking Codes and Making Connections Between You and Your Dog or Your Cat, Pocket Books Div. of Simon & Schuster, ISBN 978-0-671-02790-2
