= Bertold Mainka =

Polish rower

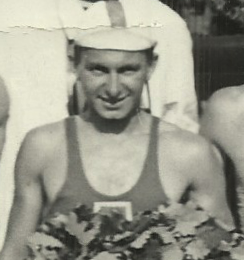

Personal information
- Nationality: Polish
- Born: 4 June 1934 (age 90); Zabrze, Poland

Sport
- Sport: Rowing

Bertold Mainka (born 4 June 1934) is a Polish rower. He competed in the men's coxed pair event at the 1956 Summer Olympics.
