= Ihor Yemchuk =

Ukrainian rower (1930–2008)

Personal information
- Born: Igor Fedorovich Yemchuk; 2 December 1930
- Died: 5 March 2008 (aged 77)

Sport
- Sport: Rowing
Medal record
Men's rowing
Representing the Soviet Union
Olympic Games
Silver medal – second place	1952 Helsinki	Double sculls
Bronze medal – third place	1956 Melbourne	Coxed pair
European Rowing Championships
Bronze medal – third place	1954 Amsterdam	Double sculls
Gold medal – first place	1955 Ghent	Double sculls
Silver medal – second place	1957 Duisburg	Coxed pair

Igor Fedorovich Yemchuk (Ukrainian: Ігор Федорович Ємчук, 2 December 1930 – 5 March 2008) was a Ukrainian rower who competed for the Soviet Union in the 1952 Summer Olympics and in the 1956 Summer Olympics. In 1952 he won the silver medal with his partner Heorhiy Zhylin in the double sculls event. Four years later he was a crew member of the Soviet boat which won the bronze medal in the coxed pairs competition.
