= Włodzimierz Śpiewak =

Polish footballer

Personal information
- Date of birth: 27 January 1938
- Place of birth: Sosnowiec, Poland
- Date of death: 25 September 1997 (aged 59)
- Height: 1.75 m (5 ft 9 in)
- Position: Defender

Youth career
- 1952–1956: Stal Sosnowiec

Senior career*
Years	Team	Apps	(Gls)
1956–1968	Zagłębie Sosnowiec	232	(4)
1968–1969	Zagłębie Wałbrzych		
- A.A.C. Eagles
- St. Louis Stars

International career
1962–1964	Poland	8	(0)

Managerial career
- GKS Dąbrowa Górnicza
- * Club domestic league appearances and goals

Włodzimierz Śpiewak (27 January 1938 – 25 September 1997) was a Polish footballer who played as a defender.

He made eight appearances for the Poland national team from 1962 to 1964.

== Honours ==
Zagłębie Sosnowiec

- II liga North: 1959
- Polish Cup: 1961–62, 1962–63
