= Igor Buldakov =

Soviet rower

Personal information
- Born: Igor Vasilevich Buldakov; 26 August 1930
- Died: 30 April 1979 (aged 48)

Sport
- Sport: Rowing
Medal record
Men's rowing
Representing the Soviet Union
Olympic Games
Silver medal – second place	1956 Melbourne	Coxless pair
European Rowing Championships
Gold medal – first place	1953 Copenhagen	Coxless pair
Silver medal – second place	1954 Amsterdam	Coxless pair
Gold medal – first place	1955 Ghent	Coxless pair
Gold medal – first place	1956 Bled	Coxless pair

Igor Vasilevich Buldakov (Russian: Игорь Васильевич Булдаков, 26 August 1930 – 30 April 1979) was a Russian rower who competed for the Soviet Union in the 1956 Summer Olympics.

In 1956 he and his partner Viktor Ivanov won the silver medal in the coxless pairs event.
