= Livien Ven =

Belgian rower

Personal information
- Nationality: Belgian
- Born: 16 February 1934; Antwerp, Belgium
- Died: 20 May 2015 (aged 81); Antwerp, Belgium

Sport
- Sport: Rowing

Livien Ven (16 February 1934 – 20 May 2015) was a Belgian rower. He competed in the men's coxed pair event at the 1956 Summer Olympics.
