= George Yeomans Pocock =

Designer and builder of racing shells

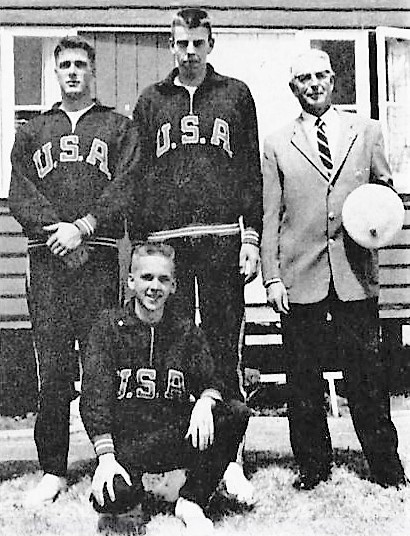
- 1956 U.S. Olympic champions in the coxed pairs. Left to right, standing: Dan Ayrault, Conn Findlay and coach George Pocock, sitting Kurt Seiffert.
- Born: March 23, 1891; Kingston upon Thames, England, UK
- Died: March 19, 1976 (aged 84); Seattle, Washington, U.S.

George Yeomans (Note: See the "Middle name" section for information on the spelling of Pocock's middle name.) Pocock (March 23, 1891 – March 19, 1976) was a leading designer and builder of racing shells in the 20th century. He was also a crew coach and an elder statesman of the sport.

Pocock-built shells began to win U.S. Intercollegiate Rowing Association championships in 1923. He achieved international recognition by providing the eight-oared racing shells which won gold medals in the 1936 Summer Olympics with a crew from the University of Washington, and again in 1948 and 1952. In this era, nearly every collegiate and sport rowing program in America used wooden shells and oars built by Pocock. Beyond his achievements as a boatbuilder, his influence, promotion and philosophy of rowing have inspired countless oarsmen and coaches.

== Biography ==
A native of Kingston upon Thames, England, Pocock learned the craft of boat-building as an apprentice to his father, Aaron Frederick Pocock, a boat-builder for Eton College, and progressive father of five, who encouraged his children in the sport (including his 6' tall daughter Lucy). A champion sculler himself, Pocock (along with his brother, Dick) used prize money earned from racing to emigrate from England to Vancouver, British Columbia, Canada, in 1911, in search of better employment prospects. The brothers, with help from their sister Lucy, who had emigrated with their father and another sister, established an independent boat-building business, initially supplying rowers affiliated with organizations such as the Vancouver Rowing Club, and the Prince Rupert Rowing Club.

In 1912, Hiram Boardman Conibear, rowing coach at the University of Washington, visited the Pocock brothers at their Vancouver Harbour shop and convinced them to move to Seattle to build boats for the Washington crews. When rowing at U.W. was shut down during World War I, and there were no boats to be built, the Pocock brothers hired on as pontoon builders for a fledgling Seattle aircraft manufacturer, Pacific Aero Products, which was the forerunner to Boeing. In 1922 as the use of wooden components in the manufacture of airplanes began to decline in favor of metal, George left Boeing to return to boatbuilding for Pocock Racing Shells on the campus of the University of Washington.

Over the next half-century, Pocock perfected the craft of building fast and efficient wooden shells, introducing many innovations including the use of western redcedar for the outer skin of the shells. He was appointed Boatman to U.S. Olympic Rowing Teams in 1936, 1948, 1952, and 1956. He was a mentor to many of the day's rowing coaches, and continues to be revered by oarsmen and coaches for his contributions to the sport of rowing.

== Middle name ==
George Yeomans Pocock's birth certificate

Pocock's middle name was 'Yeomans', as shown on his birth certificate, and despite its misspelling as 'Yeoman' in some popular literature, including The Boys in the Boat.

== Awards ==
Pocock was named "Sports Star of the Year" for 1948 by the Seattle Post-Intelligencer.

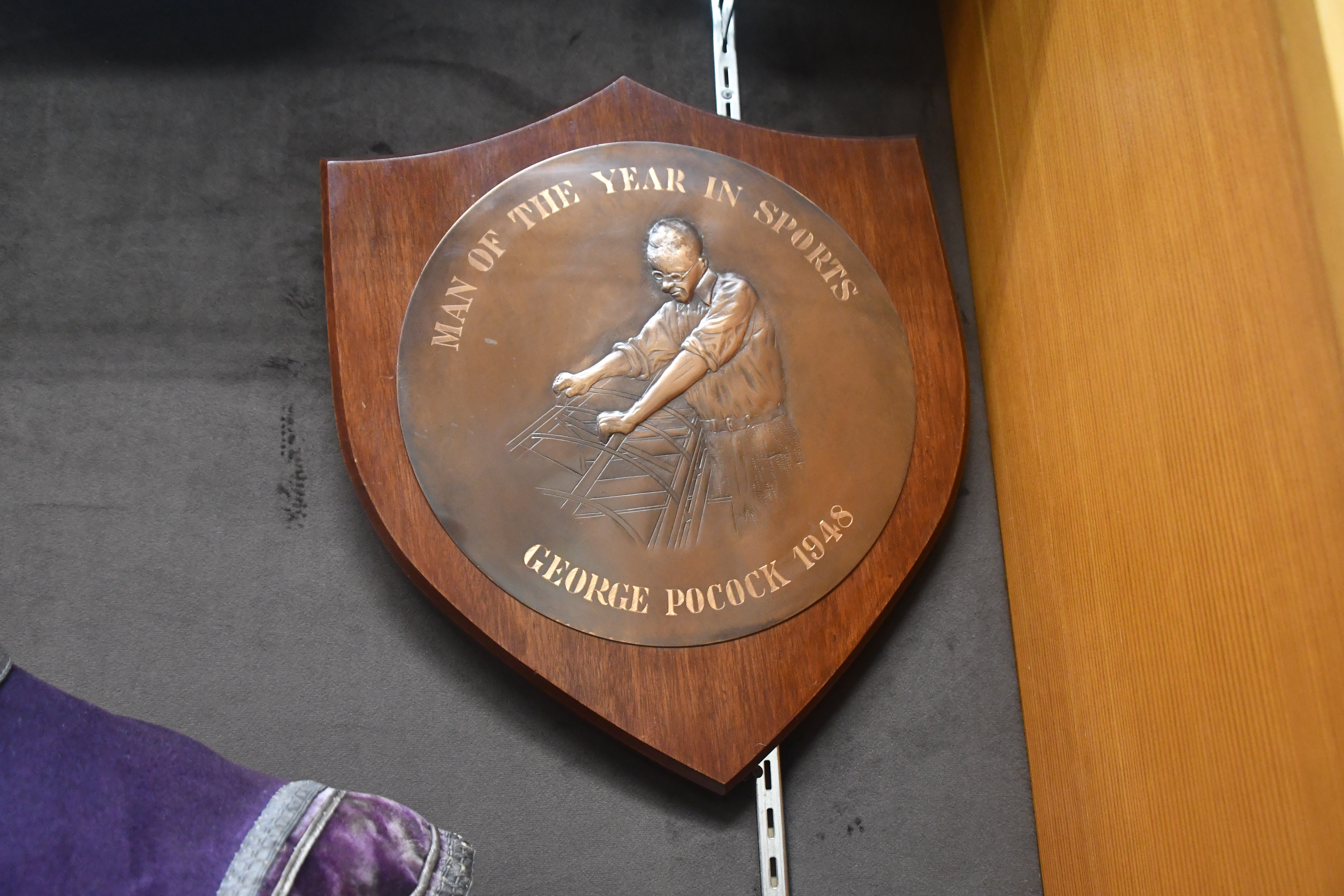
Plaque awarded to George Pocock at Seattle 1949 Man of the Year in Sports Banquet

Inducted into USRowing’s Hall of Fame in 1966 as “Premier boat-builder.”

Inducted into Washington State Sports Hall of Fame in 2015.

== See also ==
- The Boys in the Boat (film)
