= Bob Baetens =

Belgian rower (1930–2016)

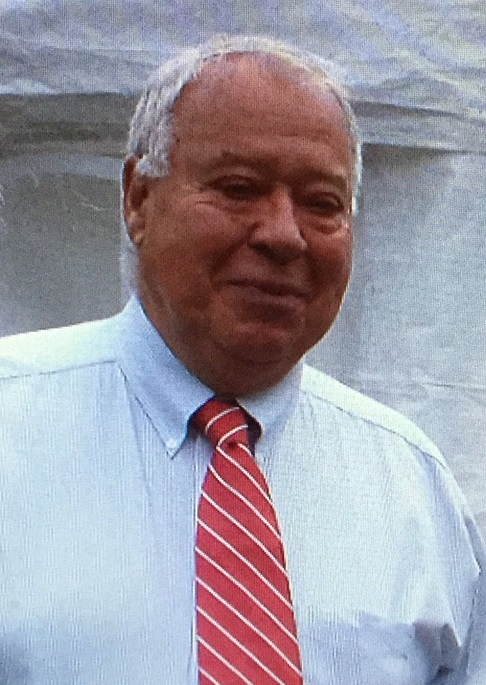
- Bob Baetens in 2016.

Personal information
- Born: Robert Frédérik Louis Baetens; 28 October 1930 Antwerp
- Died: 19 October 2016 (aged 85)

Sport
- Sport: Rowing
Medal record
Men's rowing
Representing Belgium
Olympic Games
Silver medal – second place	1952 Helsinki	Coxless pair
European Rowing Championships
Gold medal – first place	1951 Mâcon	Coxless pair
Silver medal – second place	1953 Copenhagen	Coxless pair
Silver medal – second place	1955 Ghent	Coxless pair
Bronze medal – third place	1956 Bled	Coxless pair

Robert Frédérik Louis Baetens (28 October 1930 – 19 October 2016) was a Belgian rower who competed in the 1952 Summer Olympics and in the 1956 Summer Olympics. He was born in Antwerp. In 1952 he won the silver medal with his partner Michel Knuysen in the coxless pairs event. Four years later he was eliminated with his partner Michel Knuysen in the repechage of the coxless pair competition.
