= David Pocock (disambiguation) =

David Pocock (born 1988) is an Australian politician and rugby union international.

David Pocock may also refer to:

- David Pocock (RAF officer), senior Royal Air Force officer
- David Francis Pocock (1928–2007), British anthropologist
