= Jürgen Stiefel =

German water polo player

Personal information
- Nationality: German
- Born: 21 December 1953 (age 71); Esslingen am Neckar, West Germany

Sport
- Sport: Water polo

Jürgen Stiefel (born 21 December 1953) is a German water polo player. He competed at the 1972 Summer Olympics and the 1976 Summer Olympics.
