= Péter Zsoldos =

- Born: 20 April 1930; Szentes, Hungary
- Died: 26 September 1997 (aged 67); Budapest, Hungary
- Writing career
- Genres: Novels, Short stories
- Notable works: The Viking Returns, Distant Fire, The Mission, Counterpoint, The Last Temptation

Péter Zsoldos (April 20, 1930 – September 26, 1997) was a Hungarian science fiction author who largely wrote about themes common in US/UK science fiction like space travel and robots. His best known work is probably Ellenpont, which translates as Counterpoint. The book explores the attempts of artificial intelligences abandoned by Man to uncover their origins and, ultimately, to rediscover mankind.

== Biography ==
Influenced by Aldous Huxley and Aleksey Tolstoy, his ambition had been to become a writer since the age of fifteen. He was interested in astronomy, geography, geology and later in archeology. Despite all these interests he obtained a degree in music education and choir leading in 1956. Subsequently, he became a music editor and reporter at Radio Budapest from 1963 to 1967. His career in science fiction literature started in 1963. The majority of his works are science fiction novels, but he also published articles in music. In his works he examines the progression of human relations in conditions different from today's circumstances. He freely travels among the possible ways of future seeking human-like intelligence and the contact with it. This contact can lead to successful co-operation (Distant Fire), but also to involuntary tragedy (Counterpoint). In his first book, The Viking Returns, the first part of the later "Viking Trilogy", he tells the story of astronauts landing on an extrasolar planet and making contact with the inhabitants of the planet, similar to humans of the early Bronze Age. In The Mission, he describes an even closer contact: the dead astronauts' personalities revive in the brains of inhabitants of the distant planet, thus creating an exciting coexistence of differently evolved intellects sharing one body. Later, Counterpoint leads to an age after the annihilation of human civilization where self-developing robots attempt to find their origins, relying on faint memories and doubtful speculations.

Like Stanisław Lem, he became critical of the perceived negative impact of the popularity of science fiction in the mid-1980s, of what he saw as the dilution of the genre and the subculture that appeared with it, which he said were, among other things, "smuggling in horror and pornography and making pseudo-scientific myths".

Of the relationship between his two professions (musician and writer), he wrote in the preface to the third edition of The Mission: "The laws of musical form and structure, stricter than those of any other art, and at the same time the freedom of imagination which results from the very strictness of these laws, were a great school." His novel Counterpoint reflects this relationship in its very title.

== List of works ==
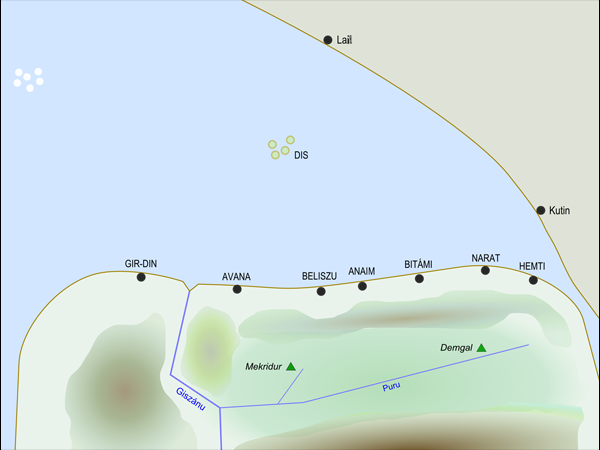
Avana city on planet Gáma, Távoli tűz - Distant Fire (1969)

=== Novels ===
- A Viking visszatér - The Viking Returns (1963)
- Távoli tűz - Distant Fire (1969)
- A feladat - The Mission (1971)
- Ellenpont - Counterpoint (1973)
- Portré négy ülésben (1979)
- A holtak nem vetnek árnyékot - The Departed Do Not Cast Shadows (1983)
- Az utolsó kísértés - The Last Temptation (1988)

The Viking Returns, Distant Fire and The Last Temptation are together also known as "Viking Trilogy" or "Avana Trilogy".

=== Short stories ===
- A jó testőr - The Good Bodyguard (in X Magazin, 1997)
- Severus (in Galaktika, 2007)

== Interesting facts ==
- A Hungarian science fiction association, Avana is named after a fictional city, scene of Distant Fire.
- The progressive rock band Solaris named their album Counterpoint after Zsoldos's book.
