= François Van Den Bosch =

Belgian cyclist

Personal information
- Born: 8 September 1934 (age 92) Antwerp, Belgium

Cycling career
- Sport: Cycling

François Van Den Bosch (born 8 September 1934) is a former Belgian cyclist. He competed in the individual and team road race events at the 1956 Summer Olympics.
