= Ernst C. Stiefel =

American lawyer

- Born: 27 November 1907; Mannheim, Baden, Germany
- Died: 3 September 1997 (aged 89); Baden-Baden, Baden-Württemberg, Germany
- Occupation: Jurist

Ernst Carl Stiefel (/ˈstiːfəl/ STEE-fəl; 27 November 1907 – 3 September 1997) was a German American jurist. Of Jewish background, he left Nazi Germany in 1933.

Born in Mannheim, he earned a doctorate in law from Heidelberg University in 1929 and started practicing in his hometown in 1933. When his licensure was struck off due to the Gesetz über die Zulassung zur Rechtsanwaltschaft only two weeks later, he emigrated to Strasbourg, France, working for an insurance company.

On the brink of World War II, he emigrated to the United States in 1939 working as a plongeur. He was drafted into the United States Army as an enemy alien in 1943, and served in the Office of Strategic Services. In 1944, he became a US citizen. He returned to Germany after World War II had ended, and helped lay the legal groundwork for a system of restitution and reparation to Holocaust survivors living abroad.

Returning to the US in 1947, he passed the bar exam in New York and starting working at the newly founded Cleary Gottlieb Friendly & Hamilton. In 1971, he became a senior counsel for Coudert Brothers, and from 1975 on we was a professor of Comparative Law at New York Law School.

While living in US, Stiefel visited Germany annually, and died in 1997 during a stay in Baden-Baden. He was married briefly and left no issue.
