= Bruce Dickson (rower) =

Australian rower

Bruce D. Dickson
Personal information
- Nationality: Australian
- Born: 17 October 1932
- Died: 13 December 2006 (aged 74)

Sport
- Sport: Rowing

Bruce Dickson (17 October 1932 – 13 December 2006) was an Australian rower. He most notably competed in the 1956 Summer Olympics.

== Early life ==
Dickson was born on 17 October 1932. He was educated at the Sydney Church of England Grammar School with his brother.

== Career ==
=== Pre-Olympics ===
Locally, Dickson was a part of the Albert Park Rowing Club, and in 1955, he played in the Interstate Men’s Coxed Pair Championship stroke. In this competition, he came first.

=== Olympics ===
Dickson spent 7 years training with his training partner Robert Duncan at the Albert Park Rowing Club, overseen by Duncan's father, Harry. When they qualified, they played for Australia in the 1956 Summer Olympics in the Male Coaxed Pairs category, playing the Soviet Union and Chile in the quarterfinal. His team was defeated in the semi-final by the USA and West Germany.

=== Post-Olympics ===
Dickson played in the 1964 Australian National Rowing Championships in both the coxless and coxed. He played for Leichhardt, with 4 people in the boat, in the second position, and placed second both times.
