= William Goddard (engineer) =

William A. Goddard
- Born: July 10, 1913; St. Joseph, Missouri
- Died: September 29, 1997 (aged 84); Chico, California
- Education: Occidental College
- Awards: National Inventors Hall Of Fame in 2007
- Scientific career
- Fields: Physics

William A. Goddard (July 10, 1913 in St. Joseph, Missouri – September 29, 1997 in Chico, California) was an American engineer and inventor. He earned a degree in physics from Occidental College. Before working in industry, Goddard was a high school science teacher in Los Angeles. He briefly worked in the aerospace industry for North American Aviation, Inc. before becoming an engineer at International Business Machines (IBM). His most acclaimed achievement is co-inventing along with John Lynott United States Patent 3,503,060, which is entitled “Direct Access Magnetic Disc Storage Device”. This invention claims cover modern-day hard disk drives.

== Pre-IBM ==
Goddard worked on wind tunnel work for North American Aviation. He was to work on similar wind tunnel innovations for a Los Angeles airplane manufacturer at IBM, but shortly after he was hired, the contract for that project was dropped. Goddard was instead hired as an engineer, and became involved in the magnetic storage disk project when the United States Air Force called upon IBM in order to be “mechanized”. The base required a mechanism to “store data” virtually for its operations, and from this necessity, the disk storage project was conceived.

== RAMAC Project at IBM ==
William Goddard was a member of the San Jose, California–based engineering team that developed the 350 Disk Storage Unit, a major component of the IBM 305 RAMAC Computer. The magnetic disk drive represented a technological leap forward in rapid access to mass data storage, substantially faster than the then dominant tape drive.

The CPU unit, also known as the 305 Processing unit, was responsible for the write-in and read-out operations of the IBM 350. “Instructions” were provided to the unit coded as “memory addresses”. These addresses referred to specific locations on the disc in which a transducer was either commanded to write-in or read-out data.

Goddard's research began in the early 1950s at IBM's Laboratory located on 99 Notre Dame Avenue in San Jose, CA.

He did not see his work as particularly complex. As he puts it, “it was not high tech, or very scientific. It was more like something you’d do in your garage.”

The IBM 350 Disk Storage Unit consisted of the magnetic disk memory unit with an access mechanism, the controls for the access mechanism, and a small air compressor. Assembled with covers, the 350 apparatus was 60 inches (1.5 m) long, 68 inches (1.7 m) high and 29 inches (0.74 m) deep. It was configured with 50 magnetic disks containing 50,000 sectors, each of which held 100 six-bit alphanumeric characters, for a capacity of 5 million six-bit characters.

Disks rotated at 1,200 rpm, tracks were recorded at up to 100 bits per inch, and typical head-to-disk spacing was 800 microinches (20 μm). The execution of a "seek" instruction positioned a read-write head to the track that contained the desired sector and selected the sector for a later read or write operation. Seek time averaged about 600 milliseconds.

== Specifications of the original IBM 350 ==
• Capacity: 5 million characters • Disks: 50 • Access time: 800 ms • Tracks per side: 100 • Area density: 2000-bit/in^{2} • Rotational speed: 1200 rpm

== Air-bearing head ==
The magnetic disk drive consisted of a stack of closely spaced, magnetically coated disks mounted on a rotating shaft, with read-write heads that did not physically touch the storage surface. Goddard's and Lynott's key innovation was the air-bearing head, which “floated” very close to the rotating disks without actually touching them, greatly increasing the speed of access.

This air-bearing head, also known as a magnetic transducer, had the ability to move freely, which enabled the disk to be recorded and read from a vast number of different positions.

The primary purpose of the air-bearing head was to allow the device to have rapid random access ability to any storage location. Additionally, the creation also allowed several magnetic discs to be mounted on a shaft in which a transducer could interact with more than one magnetic disk.

== Patents ==
An invention disclosure, filed on December 14, 1954, by Lou Stevens, Ray Bowdle, Jim Davis, Dave Kean, Bill Goddard and John Lynott resulted in two US Patents, 3,134,997, "Data Storage Machine" to Stevens, Goddard and Lynott, claiming the RAMAC and subsequently 3,503,060, "Direct Access Magnetic Storage Disk Device" to Goddard and Lynott, claiming floating heads and disk drives in general. These patents make an analogy to how his invention acts hypothetically: “the operation may be compared with the manner in which skilled operators select cards from a card file index.”

== Evolution of the IBM 350 ==
Modern Hard disk drives are similar to the IBM 350 Disk Storage Unit in many ways but there are two substantial differences in that modern drives have one head per surface whereas the IBM 350 had only two heads which moved between 50 surfaces and modern heads fly on an air bearing created by the rotating disks whereas the IBM 350 heads floated on compressed air forced between the head and the disk. Hard disk drives are used as the main components for storage on today's computers. Hard disk drives have many times more storage capacity than the IBM 350 due to considerable innovations in areal densities on disks which at times was doubling every two years.

== Magnetic Disk Heritage Center ==
The Magnetic Disk Heritage Center has played an active role in preserving RAMAC 350 units created by Johnson and his team at IBM. Originally located at Santa Clara University, the project was managed by Dr. Al Hoagland and a group of seniors at the university. Operations have since moved to the Computer History Museum in Mountain View, CA. Goddard's daughter, Bonnie Burham, is one of the organization's major private donors.

== National Inventors Hall of Fame ==
William Goddard was inducted in the National Inventors Hall of Fame with John Lynott in 2007 for their contribution to the invention of the first magnetic disk drive. It is hailed as one of the most significant inventions in the computer industry and it has since emerged to become an industry of its own with an annual revenue of $22 billion worldwide.

== Patents ==
- Goddard and Lynott, U.S. patent 3,503,060, "Direct Access Magnetic Disk Storage Device"
- Stevens et al., U.S. patent 3,134,097, "Data Storage Machine"
