= Jos Van Thillo =

Belgian rower

Personal information
- Born: 21 December 1942 (age 82); Borgerhout, Belgium

Sport
- Sport: Rowing

Jacques Van Thillo (born 21 December 1942) is a Belgian coxswain. He competed at the 1956 Summer Olympics in Melbourne with the men's coxed pair where they were eliminated in the semi-final.
