= Henryk Jagodziński =

Polish rower

Personal information
- Nationality: Polish
- Born: 25 November 1925; Będzin, Poland
- Died: 6 January 2002 (aged 76); Warsaw, Poland

Sport
- Sport: Rowing

Henryk Jagodziński (25 November 1925 – 6 January 2002) was a Polish rower. He competed at the 1952 Summer Olympics and the 1956 Summer Olympics.
