= Zbigniew Schwarzer =

Polish rower

Personal information
- Nationality: Polish
- Born: 12 January 1928; Poznań, Poland
- Died: 14 April 2008 (aged 80); Wrocław, Poland

Sport
- Sport: Rowing

Zbigniew Schwarzer (12 January 1928 – 14 April 2008) was a Polish rower. He competed at the 1952 Summer Olympics and the 1956 Summer Olympics.
