= Heorhiy Zhylin =

Ukrainian rower (1925–1997)

Personal information
- Born: Heorhiy Semenovych Zhylin; 18 August 1925 Kiev, Ukrainian SSR, Soviet Union
- Died: 12 September 1997 (aged 72)

Sport
- Sport: Rowing
- Club: Nauka Kiev
Medal record
Men's rowing
Representing the Soviet Union
Olympic Games
Silver medal – second place	1952 Helsinki	Double sculls
Bronze medal – third place	1956 Melbourne	Coxed pair
European Rowing Championships
Bronze medal – third place	1954 Amsterdam	Double sculls
Gold medal – first place	1955 Ghent	Double sculls
Silver medal – second place	1957 Duisburg	Coxed pair

Heorhiy Semenovych Zhylin (Ukrainian: Георгій Семенович Жилін, 18 August 1925 – 12 September 1997) was a Ukrainian rower who competed for the Soviet Union in the 1952 Summer Olympics and in the 1956 Summer Olympics.

In 1952 he won the silver medal with his partner Ihor Yemchuk in the double sculls event.

Four years later he was a crew member of the Soviet boat which won the bronze medal in the coxed pairs competition.
