= Karl-Heinrich von Groddeck =

West German rower

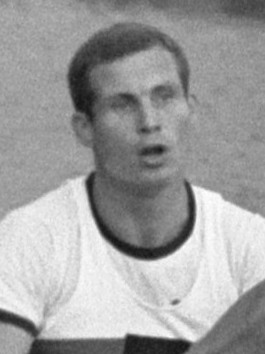

Personal information
- Born: 19 July 1936 Tutow, Germany
- Died: 13 December 2011 (aged 75) Bad Bellingen, Germany
- Height: 1.90 m (6 ft 3 in)
- Weight: 88 kg (194 lb)

Sport
- Sport: Rowing
- Club: Ratzeburger RC
Medal record
Representing Germany
Summer Olympics
Gold medal – first place	1960 Rome	Eight
Silver medal – second place	1956 Melbourne	Coxed pair
Silver medal – second place	1964 Tokyo	Eight
Representing West Germany
World Rowing Championships
Gold medal – first place	1962 Lucerne	Eight
European Rowing Championships
Gold medal – first place	1956 Bled	Coxed pair
Gold medal – first place	1957 Duisburg	Coxed pair
Gold medal – first place	1959 Mâcon	Eight
Gold medal – first place	1963 Copenhagen	Eight
Gold medal – first place	1964 Amsterdam	Eight

Karl-Heinrich Erich Moritz von Groddeck (19 July 1936 – 14 December 2011) was a German rower who won three Olympic medals for the United Team of Germany: a silver in the coxed pairs in 1956 and a gold and a silver in the eights in 1960 and 1964, respectively. He also won one world and five European titles in these two rowing events between 1956 and 1964 for West Germany. In 1964 he retired from competitions.

Back in 1958, von Groddeck moved from Wiesbaden to Hamburg to work for Axel Springer AG as a journalist in the sports section of a newspaper. For many years he was reporting the history of German rowing. Later he worked as a freelance journalist.
