= List of 1904 Summer Olympics medal winners =

The 1904 Summer Olympics, officially the Games of the III Olympiad, were an international multi-sport event which was held in 1904 in St. Louis, Missouri, United States.

== Archery ==
Event	Gold	Silver	Bronze
Men's double York round	George Bryant; United States	Robert Williams; United States	William Thompson; United States
Men's double American round	George Bryant; United States	Robert Williams; United States	William Thompson; United States
Men's team round	United States; William Thompson; Robert Williams; Louis Maxson; Galen Spencer	United States; Charles Woodruff; William Clark; Charles Hubbard; Samuel Duvall	United States; George Bryant; Wallace Bryant; Cyrus Edwin Dallin; Henry B. Richardson
Women's double National round	Matilda Howell; United States	Emma Cooke; United States	Jessie Pollock; United States
Women's double Columbia round	Matilda Howell; United States	Emma Cooke; United States	Jessie Pollock; United States
Women's team round	United States; Matilda Howell; Jessie Pollock; Laura Woodruff; Leonie Taylor	None awarded	None awarded

== Athletics ==
Event	Gold	Silver	Bronze
60 metres	Archie Hahn 7.0 s United States	William Hogenson 7.2 s United States	Fay Moulton 7.2 s United States
100 metres	Archie Hahn 11.0 s United States	Nate Cartmell 11.2 s United States	William Hogenson 11.2 s United States
200 metres	Archie Hahn 21.6 s United States	Nate Cartmell 21.9 s United States	William Hogenson; United States
400 metres	Harry Hillman 49.2 s United States	Frank Waller 49.9 s United States	Herman Groman 50.0 s United States
800 metres	James Lightbody 1:56.0; United States	Howard Valentine 1:56.3; United States	Emil Breitkreutz 1:56.4; United States
1500 metres	James Lightbody 4:05.4; United States	Frank Verner 4:06.8; United States	Lacey Hearn; United States
Marathon	Thomas Hicks 3:28:53; United States	Albert Corey (FRA) 3:34:52; United States (Note: As Frenchman Albert Corey (FRA) represented an American club, his participation and medals are attributed to the United States. (Note: In 2024, the International Olympic Committee (IOC) reinstated its original and current attribution policy for athletes at the early Olympic Games (1896–1904). Participation and medals have been attributed according to the national affiliation of the club or team represented by the athlete, rather than their nationality.))	Arthur Newton 3:47:33; United States
110 metres hurdles	Fred Schule 16.0 s United States	Thaddeus Shideler 16.3 s United States	Lesley Ashburner 16.4 s United States
200 metres hurdles	Harry Hillman 24.6 s United States	Frank Castleman 24.9 s United States	George Poage; United States
400 metres hurdles	Harry Hillman 53.0 s United States	Frank Waller 53.2 s United States	George Poage 56.8 s United States
2590 metres steeplechase	James Lightbody 7:39.6; United States	John Daly 7:40.6; Great Britain	Arthur Newton 7:45.6; United States
4 miles team race	United States; New York AC; Arthur Newton; George Underwood; Paul Pilgrim; Howard Valentine; David Munson	United States; Chicago AA; James Lightbody; Frank Verner; Lacey Hearn; Albert Corey (FRA); Sidney Hatch	none awarded
Long jump	Myer Prinstein 7.34 m United States	Daniel Frank 6.89 m United States	Robert Stangland 6.88 m United States
Triple jump	Myer Prinstein 14.35 m United States	Fred Englehardt 13.90 m United States	Robert Stangland 13.36 m United States
High jump	Samuel Jones; United States	Garrett Serviss; United States	Paul Weinstein; Germany
Pole vault	Charles Dvorak; United States	LeRoy Samse; United States	Louis Wilkins; United States
Standing long jump	Ray Ewry; United States	Charles King; United States	John Biller; United States
Standing triple jump	Ray Ewry; United States	Charles King; United States	Joseph Stadler; United States
Standing high jump	Ray Ewry; United States	Joseph Stadler; United States	Lawson Robertson; United States
Shot put	Ralph Rose; United States	Wesley Coe; United States	Lawrence Feuerbach; United States
Discus throw	Martin Sheridan; United States	Ralph Rose; United States	Nicolaos Georgandas; Greece
Hammer throw	John Flanagan; United States	John DeWitt; United States	Ralph Rose; United States
56 pound weight throw	Étienne Desmarteau; Canada	John Flanagan; United States	James Mitchell; United States
Triathlon	Max Emmerich; United States	John Grieb; United States	William Merz; United States
All-around	Tom Kiely; Great Britain	Adam Gunn; United States	Truxtun Hare; United States

== Boxing ==
Event	Gold	Silver	Bronze
Flyweight (47.6 kg / 105 lb)	George Finnegan; United States	Miles Burke; United States	None awarded
Bantamweight (52.2 kg / 115 lb)	Oliver Kirk; United States	George Finnegan; United States	None awarded
Featherweight (56.7 kg / 125 lb)	Oliver Kirk; United States	Frank Haller; United States	Frederick Gilmore; United States
Lightweight (61.2 kg / 135 lb)	Harry Spanjer; United States	Russell van Horn; United States ^{1}	Peter Sturholdt; United States
Welterweight (65.8 kg / 145 lb)	Albert Young; United States	Harry Spanjer; United States	Joseph Lydon; United States^{1}
Middleweight (71.7 kg / 158 lb)	Charles Mayer; United States	Benjamin Spradley; United States	None awarded
Heavyweight (over 71.7 kg/over 158 lb)	Samuel Berger; United States	Charles Mayer; United States	William Michaels; United States

^{1}Jack Egan originally won the silver medal in the lightweight competition and the bronze medal in the welterweight competition, but he was disqualified in November 1905 when it was discovered that his real name was Frank Joseph Floyd; AAU rules made it illegal to fight under an assumed name.

== Cycling ==
Event	Gold	Silver	Bronze
1/4 mile	Marcus Hurley; United States	Burton Downing; United States	Teddy Billington; United States
1/3 mile	Marcus Hurley; United States	Burton Downing; United States	Teddy Billington; United States
1/2 mile	Marcus Hurley; United States	Teddy Billington; United States	Burton Downing; United States
1 mile	Marcus Hurley; United States	Burton Downing; United States	Teddy Billington; United States
2 miles	Burton Downing; United States	Oscar Goerke; United States	Marcus Hurley; United States
5 miles	Charles Schlee; United States	George E. Wiley; United States	Arthur F. Andrews; United States
25 miles	Burton Downing; United States	Arthur F. Andrews; United States	George E. Wiley; United States

== Diving ==
Event	Gold	Silver	Bronze
Platform	George Sheldon; United States	Georg Hoffmann; Germany	Frank Kehoe; United States
Plunge for distance	William Dickey; United States	Edgar Adams; United States	Leo Goodwin; United States

== Fencing ==
Event	Gold	Silver	Bronze
Foil, Individual	Ramón Fonst; Cuba	Albertson Van Zo Post; United States	Charles Tatham; United States
Foil, Team	Mixed team Ramón Fonst (CUB); Albertson Van Zo Post (USA); Manuel Díaz (CUB)	United States; Charles Tatham; Charles Townsend; Arthur Fox	None awarded
Épée	Ramón Fonst; Cuba	Charles Tatham; United States	Albertson Van Zo Post; United States
Sabre	Manuel Díaz; Cuba	William Grebe; United States	Albertson Van Zo Post; United States
Singlestick	Albertson Van Zo Post; United States	William O'Connor; United States	William Grebe; United States

== Football ==
Gold	Silver	Bronze
Canada; Galt F.C. George Ducker; John Fraser; John Gourlay; Alexander Hall; Albert Johnston; Robert Lane; Ernest Linton; Gordon McDonald; Frederick Steep; Tom Taylor; William Twaits; Otto Christman; Albert Henderson	United States; Christian Brothers College; Charles Bartliff; Warren Brittingham; Oscar Brockmeyer; Alexander Cudmore; Charles January; John January; Thomas January; Raymond Lawler; Joseph Lydon; Louis Menges; Peter Ratican	United States; St. Rose Parish; Joseph Brady; George Cooke; Thomas Cooke; Cormic Cosgrove; Edward Dierkes; Martin Dooling; Frank Frost; Claude Jameson; Henry Jameson; Johnson; Leo O'Connell; Harry Tate

== Golf ==
Event	Gold	Silver	Bronze
Individual	George Lyon; Canada	Chandler Egan; United States	Burt McKinnie; United States Francis Newton; United States
Team	United States; Western Golf Association Edward Cummins; Kenneth Edwards; Chandler Egan; Walter Egan; Robert Hunter; Nathaniel Moore; Mason Phelps; Daniel Sawyer; Clement Smoot; Warren Wood	United States; Trans-Mississippi Golf Association John Cady; Albert Lambert; John Maxwell; Burt McKinnie; Ralph McKittrick; Francis Newton; Henry Potter; Frederick Semple; Stuart Stickney; William Stickney	United States; United States Golf Association Douglass Cadwallader; Jesse Carleton; Harold Fraser; Arthur Hussey; Orus Jones; Allen Lard; George Oliver; Simeon Price; John Rahm; Harold Weber

== Gymnastics ==
Event	Gold	Silver	Bronze
All-around	Julius Lenhart (AUT); United States (Note: As Austrian Julius Lenhart (AUT) represented an American club, his participation and medals are attributed to the United States.)	Wilhelm Weber; Germany	Adolf Spinnler (SUI); Germany (Note: As Swiss Adolf Spinnler (SUI) represented a German club, his participation and medals are attributed to Germany.)
Combined	Anton Heida; United States	George Eyser; United States	William Merz; United States
Triathlon	Adolf Spinnler (SUI); Germany	Julius Lenhart (AUT); United States	Wilhelm Weber; Germany
Team	United States; Philadelphia Turngemeinde; John Grieb; Anton Heida; Max Hess; Philip Kassel; Julius Lenhart (AUT); Ernst Reckeweg	United States; New York Turnverein; Emil Beyer; John Bissinger; Arthur Rosenkampff; Julian Schmitz; Otto Steffen; Max Wolf	United States; Central Turnverein, Chicago; John Duha; Charles Krause; George Mayer; Robert Maysack; Philip Schuster; Edward Siegler
Horizontal bar	Anton Heida; United States	none awarded	George Eyser; United States
Horizontal bar	Edward Hennig; United States	none awarded	George Eyser; United States
Parallel bars	George Eyser; United States	Anton Heida; United States	John Duha; United States
Pommel horse	Anton Heida; United States	George Eyser; United States	William Merz; United States
Rings	Herman Glass; United States	William Merz; United States	Emil Voigt; United States
Vault	George Eyser; United States	none awarded	William Merz; United States
Vault	Anton Heida; United States	none awarded	William Merz; United States
Rope climbing	George Eyser; United States	Charles Krause; United States	Emil Voigt; United States
Club swinging	Edward Hennig; United States	Emil Voigt; United States	Ralph Wilson; United States

== Lacrosse ==
Gold	Silver	Bronze
Canada; Shamrock Lacrosse Team; Élie Blanchard; William Brennaugh; George Bretz; William Burns; George Cattanach; George Cloutier; Sandy Cowan; Jack Flett; Benjamin Jamieson; Hilliard Laidlaw; Hilliard Lyle; William F. L. Orris; Lawrence Pentland	United States; St. Louis Amateur Athletic Association; J. W. Dowling; W. R. Gibson; Hugh Grogan; Philip Hess; Tom Hunter; Albert Lehman; William Murphy; William Partridge; George Passmore; William T. Passmore; W. J. Ross; Jack Sullivan; Albert Venn; A. M. Woods	Canada; Mohawk Indians; Black Hawk; Black Eagle; Almighty Voice; Flat Iron; Spotted Tail; Half Moon; Lightfoot; Snake Eater; Red Jacket; Night Hawk; Man Afraid of the Soap; Rain in Face

== Roque ==
Gold	Silver	Bronze
Charles Jacobus; United States	Smith Streeter; United States	Charles Brown; United States

== Rowing ==
Event	Gold	Silver	Bronze
Single sculls	Frank Greer; United States	James Juvenal; United States	Constance Titus; United States
Double sculls	John Mulcahy and William Varley; United States	Jamie McLoughlin and John Hoben; United States	Joseph Ravannack and John Wells; United States
Coxless pair	Robert Farnan and Joseph Ryan; United States	John Mulcahy and William Varley; United States	John Joachim and Joseph Buerger; United States
Coxless four	United States; Arthur Stockhoff; August Erker; George Dietz; Albert Nasse	United States; Frederick Suerig; Martin Formanack; Charles Aman; Michael Begley	United States; Gus Voerg; John Freitag; Lou Heim; Frank Dummerth
Eight	United States; Frederick Cresser; Michael Gleason; Frank Schell; James Flanagan; Charles Armstrong; Harry Lott; Joseph Dempsey; John Exley; Louis Abell	Canada; Arthur Bailey; William Rice; George Reiffenstein; Phil Boyd; George Strange; William Wadsworth; Don MacKenzie; Joseph Wright; Thomas Loudon	none awarded

== Swimming ==
Event	Gold	Silver	Bronze
50 yard freestyle	Zoltán Halmay; Hungary	Scott Leary; United States	Charles Daniels; United States
100 yard freestyle	Zoltán Halmay; Hungary	Charles Daniels; United States	Scott Leary; United States
220 yard freestyle	Charles Daniels; United States	Francis Gailey (AUS); United States (Note: As Australian Francis Gailey (AUS) represented an American club, his participation and medals are attributed to the United States.)	Emil Rausch; Germany
440 yard freestyle	Charles Daniels; United States	Francis Gailey (AUS); United States	Otto Wahle (AUT); United States (Note: As Austrian Otto Wahle (AUT) represented an American club, his participation and medals are attributed to the United States.)
880 yard freestyle	Emil Rausch; Germany	Francis Gailey (AUS); United States	Géza Kiss; Hungary
1 mile freestyle	Emil Rausch; Germany	Géza Kiss; Hungary	Francis Gailey (AUS); United States
100 yard backstroke	Walter Brack; Germany	Georg Hoffmann; Germany	Georg Zacharias; Germany
440 yard breaststroke	Georg Zacharias; Germany	Walter Brack; Germany	Jam Handy; United States
4×50 yard freestyle relay	United States; The New York Athletic Club; Joe Ruddy; Leo Goodwin; Louis Handley; Charles Daniels	United States; Chicago Athletic Association; David Hammond; Bill Tuttle; Hugo Goetz; Raymond Thorne	United States; Missouri Athletic Club; Amedee Reyburn; Gwynne Evans; Marquard Schwarz; Bill Orthwein

== Tennis ==
Event	Gold	Silver	Bronze
Men's singles	Beals Wright; United States	Robert LeRoy; United States	Alphonzo Bell; United States Edgar Leonard; United States
Men's doubles	United States; Beals Wright; Edgar Leonard	United States; Robert LeRoy; Alphonzo Bell	United States; Clarence Gamble; Arthur Wear United States; Joseph Wear; Allen West

== Tug of war ==
Gold	Silver	Bronze
United States; Milwaukee Athletic Club; Oscar Olson; Sidney Johnson; Henry Seiling; Conrad Magnusson; Patrick Flanagan	United States; Southwest Turnverein of St. Louis #1; Max Braun; William Seiling; Orrin Upshaw; Charles Rose; August Rodenberg	United States; Southwest Turnverein of St. Louis #2; Charles Haberkorn; Frank Kugler (GER) (Note: As German Frank Kugler (GER) represented an American club, his participation and medals are attributed to the United States.); Charles Thias; Harry Jacobs; Oscar Friede

== Water polo ==
Gold	Silver	Bronze
New York Athletic Club; United States; David Bratton; George Van Cleaf; Leo Goodwin; Louis Handley; David Hesser; Joe Ruddy; James Steen	Chicago Athletic Association; United States; Rex Beach; Jerome Steever; Edwin Swatek; Charles Healy; Frank Kehoe; David Hammond; Bill Tuttle	Missouri Athletic Club; United States; John Meyers; Manfred Toeppen; Gwynne Evans; Amedee Reyburn; Fred Schreiner; Augustus Goessling; Bill Orthwein

== Weightlifting ==
Event	Gold	Silver	Bronze
Two Hand Lift	Perikles Kakousis; Greece	Oscar Osthoff; United States	Frank Kugler (GER); United States
All Around Dumbbell	Oscar Osthoff; United States	Frederick Winters; United States	Frank Kugler (GER); United States

== Wrestling ==
Event	Gold	Silver	Bronze
Light flyweight 105 lb (47.6 kg)	Robert Curry; United States	John Hein; United States	Gustav Thiefenthaler (SUI); United States (Note: As Swiss Gustav Thiefenthaler (SUI) represented an American club, his participation and medals are attributed to the United States.)
Flyweight; 115 lb (52.2 kg)	George Mehnert; United States	Gustave Bauer; United States	William Nelson; United States
Bantamweight; 125 lb (56.7 kg)	Isidor Niflot; United States	August Wester; United States	Louis Strebler; United States
Featherweight; 135 lb (61.2 kg)	Benjamin Bradshaw; United States	Theodore McLear; United States	Charles Clapper; United States
Lightweight; 145 lb (65.8 kg)	Otto Roehm; United States	Rudolph Tesing; United States	Albert Zirkel; United States
Welterweight; 158 lb (71.7 kg)	Charles Ericksen (NOR); United States (Note: As Norwegian Charles Ericksen (NOR) represented an American club, his participation and medals are attributed to the United States.)	William Beckmann; United States	Jerry Winholtz; United States
Heavyweight over 158 lb (71.7 kg)	Bernhoff Hansen (NOR); United States (Note: As Norwegian Bernhoff Hansen (NOR) represented an American club, his participation and medals are attributed to the United States.)	Frank Kugler (GER); United States	Fred Warmbold; United States

== See also ==
- 1904 Summer Olympics medal table

== Notes ==
Main notes

Subnotes
