= Canada at the 1904 Summer Olympics =

- IOC code: CAN
- NOC: Canadian Olympic Committee

in St. Louis
- Competitors: 52
- Medals Ranked 4th: Gold 4 Silver 1 Bronze 1 Total 6

Summer Olympics appearances (overview)
- ~~1900~~; 1904; 1908; 1912; 1920; 1924; 1928; 1932; 1936; 1948; 1952; 1956; 1960; 1964; 1968; 1972; 1976; 1980; 1984; 1988; 1992; 1996; 2000; 2004; 2008; 2012; 2016; 2020; 2024; 2028

Other related appearances
- 1906 Intercalated Games

Canada competed at the 1904 Summer Olympics in St. Louis, United States. These Games were the second at which Canadian athletes participated. As in 1900 they did not compete under the Canadian flag, national teams not being introduced until the next Olympics. Unofficially, however, it was a very successful Olympics for Canada with Canadian competitors winning the fourth most medals. However, this was largely because most Europeans decided not to make the long trip to compete in the games. The Canadian athletes were a unified group for the first time and were unofficially regarded as a team.

== Medallists ==
The most notable Canadian medal winner was Etienne Desmarteau who placed first in the 56 pound weight throw. He was fired as a Montreal police officer when he left to compete at the games. Returning as a medallist and local hero he was reinstated, but died the next year of typhoid.

Canada won two golds in team sports, two thirds of Canada's total in all summer games. The Canadian soccer team from Galt, Ontario won gold and a team known as the Winnipeg Shamrocks won the field lacrosse title. The third-place finishers were also from Canada, a team of Mohawks from a reserve near Brantford.

Of note was Peter Deer, an Iroquois Indian, who competed in the 800 & 1500 metres races; he was the first Native person to represent Canada outside her borders. Deer was a mechanic by day and was a member of the Montreal Amateur Athletics Association. He was 23 in 1904, he came from Caughnawaga, a native village on the South Bank.

Medal	Name	Sport	Event	Date
Gold	Étienne Desmarteau	Athletics	Men's 56 lb weight throw	September 1
Gold	Galt F.C.: Otto Christman; George Ducker; John Fraser; John Gourlay; Alexander Hall; Albert Henderson; Albert Johnson; Robert Lane; Ernest Linton; Gordon McDonald; Frederick Steep; Tom Taylor; William Twaits	Football		November 23
Gold	George Lyon	Golf	Men's individual	September 24
Gold	Shamrock Lacrosse Team: Élie Blanchard; William Brennaugh; George Bretz; William Burns; George Cattanach; George Cloutier; Sandy Cowan; Jack Flett; Benjamin Jamieson; Stuart Laidlaw; Hilliard Lyle; William F. L. Orris; Lawrence Pentland	Lacrosse		July 7
Silver	Alan Bailey, Phil Boyd, Thomas Loudon, Don MacKenzie, George Reiffenstein, William Rice, George Strange, William Wadsworth, Joseph Wright	Rowing	Men's eight	July 30
Bronze	Mohawk Indians: Black Hawk; Black Eagle; Almighty Voice; Flat Iron; Spotted Tail; Half Moon; Lightfoot; Snake Eater; Red Jacket; Night Hawk; Man Afraid of the Soap; Rain in Face	Lacrosse		July 7

== Results by event ==
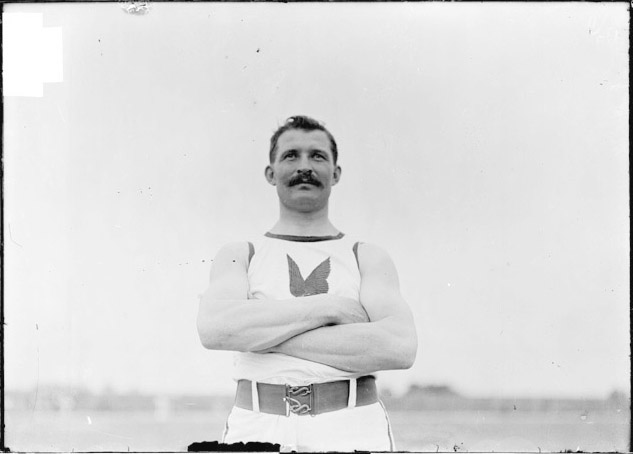
Étienne Desmarteau

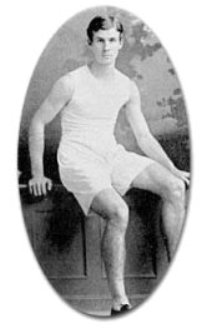
Percival Molson

=== Athletics ===
Event	Place	Athlete	Heats	Repechage	Final
Men's 60 metres	7-8	Robert Kerr	unknown 2nd, heat 3	unknown 3–4, repechage	did not advance

Event	Place	Athlete	Heats	Final
Men's 100 metres	7-11	Robert Kerr	unknown 3rd, heat 2	did not advance
Men's 200 metres	5th	Robert Kerr	unknown 3rd, heat 2	did not advance

Event	Place	Athlete	Final
Men's 400 metres	7-12	Percival Molson	unknown
Men's 800 metres	7-13	Peter Deer	unknown
Men's 800 metres	7-13	John Peck	unknown
Men's 1500 metres	6th	Peter Deer	unknown
Men's 56 pound weight throw	1st	Étienne Desmarteau	10.46 metres OR

=== Football ===
Canada made its first football appearance in 1904, sending a club team to St. Louis. The team defeated each of the two United States club teams in the round-robin tournament. The International Olympic Committee later recognized the tournament as the official one and awarded the club a gold medal for its performance.

Summary

Team	Event	Wins	Losses	Percent	Rank
Galt F.C.	Men's football	2 (USA 7–0) (USA 4–0)	0	1.000	1st place, gold medalist(s)

Standings

Pos	Team	Pld	W	D	L	GF	GA	GD	Pts	Final result
1	(Canada) Galt FC (C)	2	2	0	0	11	0	+11	4	Champions
2	(United States) Christian Brothers College (H)	3	1	1	1	2	7	−5	3	
3	(United States) St. Rose Parish (H)	3	0	1	2	0	6	−6	1	

Source: RSSF
(C) Champions; (H) Hosts

Matches

November 16, 1904

Christian Brothers College (United States)	0–7	(Canada) Galt FC
	Report; Report 2	Steep; Taylor; McDonald; Hall

Francis Olympic Field, St. Louis
Referee: Paul McSweeney (United States)

November 17, 1904

St. Rose Parish (United States)	0–4	(Canada) Galt FC
	Report	Taylor; Henderson; Unknown (o.g.)

Francis Olympic Field, St. Louis
Referee: Paul McSweeney (United States)

Team details

GK	Frank Frost
RB	George Cooke
LB	Henry Jameson
RH	Joseph Brady
CH	Edward Dierkes
LH	Martin Dooling
OR	Cormic Cosgrove
IR	Leo O'Connell
CF	Claude Jameson
IL	Harry Tate
OL	Thomas Cooke

GK	Ernest Linton
RB	George Ducker
LB	John Gourlay (c)
RH	Robert Lane
CH	Albert Johnston
LH	Otto Christman
OR	Thomas Taylor
IR	Frederick Steep
CF	Alexander Hall
IL	Albert Henderson
OL	William Twaits

Roster

Head coach: Louis Duff (Canada)

No.	Pos.	Player	Date of birth (age)	Caps	Club
	GK	Ernest Linton	17 February 1880 (aged 24)	0	(Canada) Galt FC
	DF	John Gourlay (captain)	26 July 1872 (aged 32)	0	(Canada) Galt FC
	DF	George Ducker	27 September 1871 (aged 33)	0	(Canada) Galt FC
	MF	Bobby Lane	15 January 1882 (aged 22)	0	(Canada) Galt FC
	MF	Albert Johnston	17 April 1880 (aged 24)	0	(Canada) Galt FC
	MF	Jack Fraser	15 December 1881 (aged 22)	0	(Canada) Galt FC
	MF	Otto Christman	20 February 1880 (aged 24)	0	(Canada) Galt FC
	FW	William Twaits	20 August 1878 (aged 26)	0	(Canada) Galt FC
	FW	Tom Taylor	4 December 1880 (aged 23)	0	(Canada) Galt FC
	FW	Fred Steep	20 December 1874 (aged 29)	0	(Canada) Galt FC
	FW	Gordon McDonald	2 February 1878 (aged 26)	0	(Canada) Galt FC
	FW	Sandy Hall	3 December 1880 (aged 23)	0	(Canada) Galt FC
	FW	Red Henderson	29 August 1881 (aged 23)	0	(Canada) Galt FC
	FW	Parnell Gourlay	3 February 1879 (aged 25)	0	(Canada) Galt FC

=== Golf ===
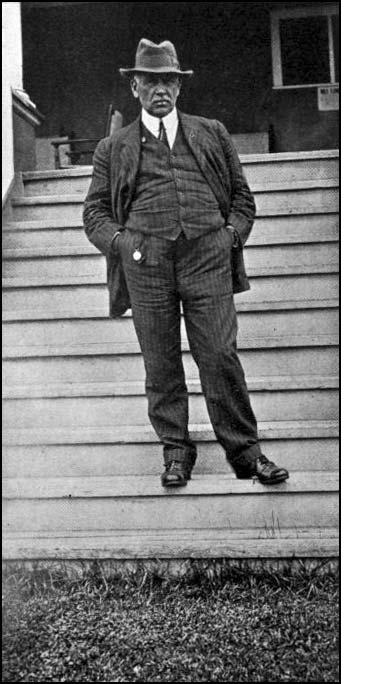
George Seymour Lyon

Event	Place	Golfer	Qualification	Round of 32	Round of 16	Quarterfinal	Semifinal	Final
Men's individual	1st	George Lyon	169 (9th)	Defeated John Cady	Defeated Stuart Stickney	Defeated Albert Lambert	Defeated Francis Newton	Defeated Chandler Egan
Men's individual	65th	Bertie Austin	211	did not advance				
Men's individual	73rd	Albert Austin	270	did not advance				

=== Lacrosse ===
Two teams from Canada played in the 1904 lacrosse competition. The Winnipeg Shamrocks defeated the team from St. Louis by a score of 8–2 in the final to win gold.

Event	Place	Team	Semifinals	Final
Men's lacrosse	1st	Shamrock Lacrosse Team	Moved directly to finals	Defeated United States; St. Louis Amateur Athletic Association
Men's lacrosse	3rd	Mohawk Indians	Lost to United States; St. Louis Amateur Athletic Association	did not advance

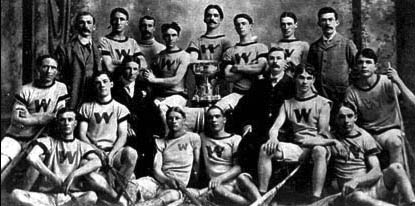
Winnipeg Shamrocks

Winnipeg Shamrocks	Mohawk Indians
George Cloutier George Cattanach; Benjamin Jamieson; Jack Flett; George Bretz; Élie Blanchard; Hilliard Laidlaw; Hilliard Lyle; William Brennaugh; L.H. Pentland; Sandy Cowan; William Burns; William F.L. Orris	Black Hawk Black Eagle; Almighty Voice; Flat Iron; Spotted Tail; Half Moon; Lightfoot; Snake Eater; Red Jacket; Night Hawk; Man Afraid of the Soap; Rain in Face

=== Rowing ===
Event	Place	Crew	Final
Eight	2nd	Arthur Bailey, William Rice, George Reiffenstein, Phil Boyd, George Strange, William Wadsworth, Don MacKenzie, Joseph Wright, Thomas Loudon	unknown
