= Snake Eater =

Snake Eater may refer to:

- Snake-Eater, a fictional member of the Phoenix Guard in G.I. Joe: America's Elite
- Snake Eater (film), a 1989 action film starring Lorenzo Lamas
- Snake Eater (identification system), the military insurgent database developed for Iraqi soldiers by U.S. military personnel and companies
- Snake Eater (lacrosse), Native American lacrosse player
- Metal Gear Solid 3: Snake Eater, a 2004 video game developed by Konami and directed by Hideo Kojima
  - "Snake Eater" (song), the theme song for the video game
  - Metal Gear Solid Delta: Snake Eater, the 2025 remake of the video game
- Ophiophagy, a specialized form of feeding or alimentary behavior of animals which hunt and eat snakes
- A member or former member of the United States Army Special Forces (i.e. Green Berets)
