= Lacrosse at the Summer Olympics =

- IOC Code: LAX
- Governing body: World Lacrosse
- Events: 1 (men)

Summer Olympics
- 1896; 1900; 1904; 1908; 1912; 1920; 1924; 1928; 1932; 1936; 1948; 1952; 1956; 1960; 1964; 1968; 1972; 1976; 1980; 1984; 1988; 1992; 1996; 2000; 2004; 2008; 2012; 2016; 2020; 2024; 2028; 2032; Note: demonstration or exhibition sport years indicated in italics
- Medalists

Lacrosse has been contested at two editions of the Summer Olympic Games, 1904 and 1908. Both times a Canadian team won the competition. In its first year, two teams from Canada and one team from the United States competed at the games in St. Louis, Missouri. Only two teams, one from Canada and one from Great Britain, competed in 1908 in London.

Lacrosse was also held as a demonstration event at the 1928, 1932, and 1948 Summer Olympics. In 1928 and 1932, the United States was represented by the Johns Hopkins Blue Jays men's lacrosse team, and in 1948 by the RPI Engineers men's lacrosse team. Canada sent an all-star team in 1928 and 1932; Great Britain sent an all-star team in 1928 and 1948.

The International Olympic Committee granted provisional status to World Lacrosse in 2018 and in October 2023, the sport was approved to be included in the 2028 Olympics in Los Angeles. It will be played in the lacrosse sixes format.

== Event ==
• = official event, (d) = demonstration event

| Event | 04 | 08 | 12 | 20 | 24 | 28 | 32 | 36 | 48 | 1952–2024 | 28 |
|---|---|---|---|---|---|---|---|---|---|---|---|
| Men's lacrosse | • | • | | | | (d) | (d) | | (d) | | • |

== Medal table ==
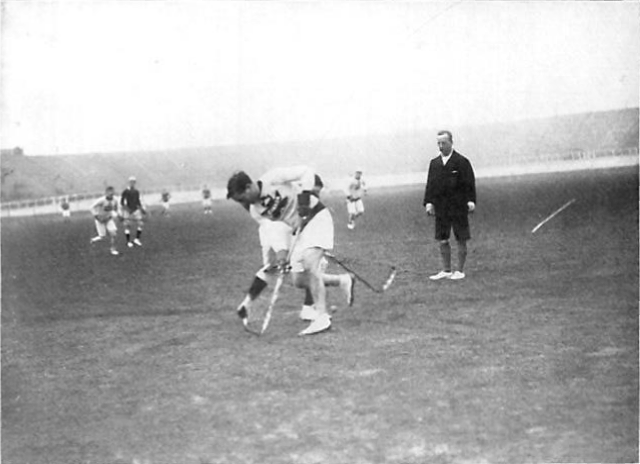
Lacrosse at the 1908 Summer Olympics

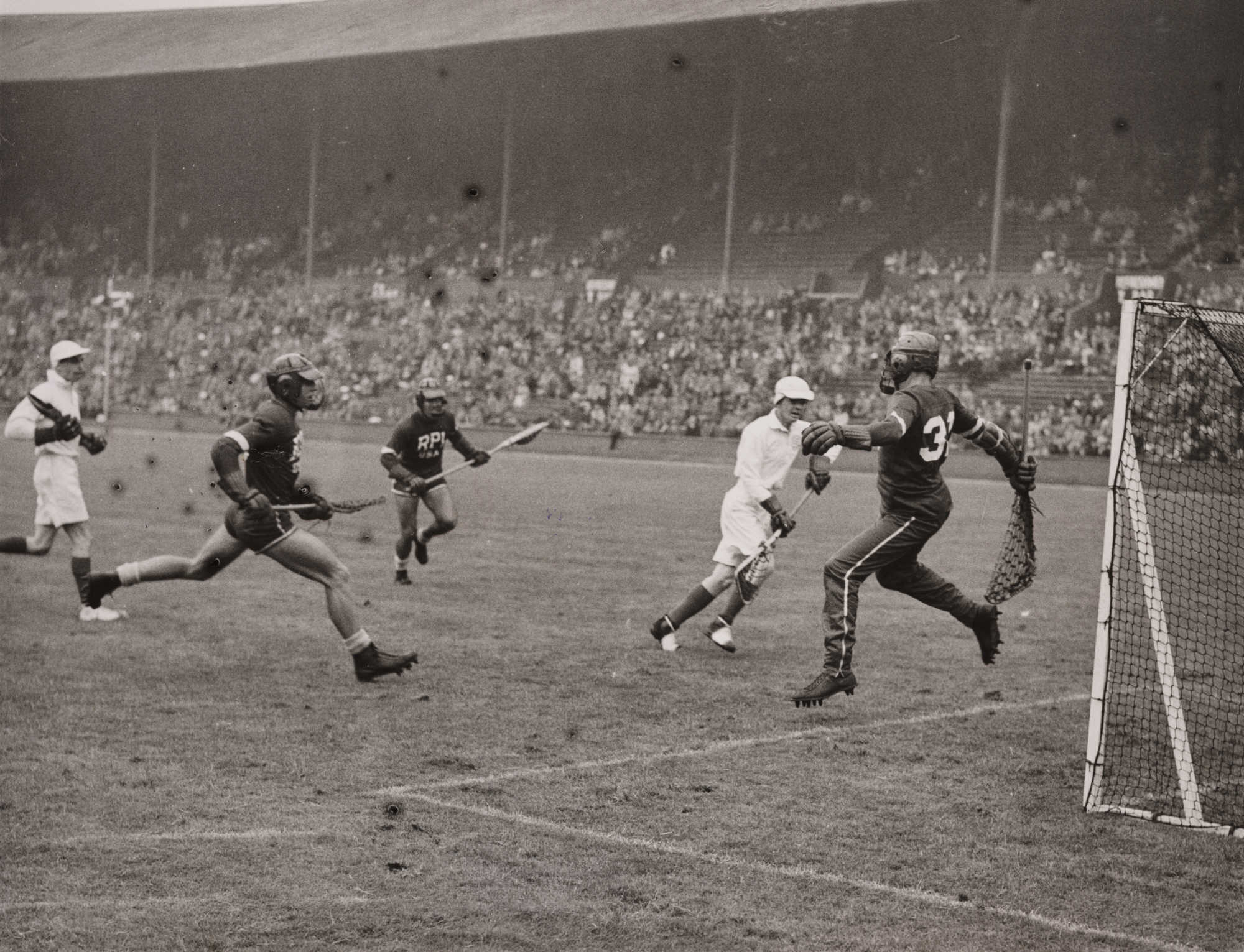
Lacrosse at the 1948 Summer Olympics

Every team that has played lacrosse has won a medal. Canada has won three of the five medals, by virtue of having had three of the five competing teams.

| Rank | Nation | Gold | Silver | Bronze | Total |
|---|---|---|---|---|---|
| 1 | Canada | 2 | 0 | 1 | 3 |
| 2 | Great Britain | 0 | 1 | 0 | 1 |
| 2 | United States | 0 | 1 | 0 | 1 |
| Totals (3 entries) | | 2 | 2 | 1 | 5 |

== Men ==
| Games | Gold | Silver | Bronze |
|---|---|---|---|
| 1904 St. Louis | Canada; Élie Blanchard; William Brennaugh; George Bretz; William Burns; George Cattanach; George Cloutier; Sandy Cowan; Jack Flett; Benjamin Jamieson; Hilliard Laidlaw; Hilliard Lyle; William F. L. Orris; Lawrence Pentland | United States; J. W. Dowling; W. R. Gibson; Hugh Grogan; Philip Hess; Tom Hunter; Albert Lehman; William Murphy; William Partridge; George Passmore; William T. Passmore; W. J. Ross; Jack Sullivan; Albert Venn; A. M. Woods | Canada; Black Hawk; Black Eagle; Almighty Voice; Flat Iron; Spotted Tail; Half Moon; Lightfoot; Snake Eater; Red Jacket; Night Hawk; Man Afraid of the Soap; Rain in Face |
| 1908 London | Canada; Frank Dixon; George Campbell; Gus Dillon; Richard Louis Duckett; George Rennie; Clarence McKerrow; Alexander Turnbull; Henry Hoobin; Ernest Hamilton; John Broderick; Tommy Gorman; Patrick Brennan (Capt.); D. McLeod; A. Mara; J. Fyon | Great Britain; Gustav Alexander; George Buckland; Eric Dutton; S. N. Hayes; Wilfrid Johnson; Edward Jones; Reginald Martin; Gerald Mason; Johnson Parker-Smith; Hubert Ramsey (Capt.); Charles Scott; Norman Whitley; C. J. Mason; F. S. Johnson; V. G. Gilbey; H. Shorrocks; J. Alexander; L. Blockey | None - only two teams competed |
| 1912–2024 | Not included in the Olympic program | | |
| 2028 Los Angeles | | | |

== Women ==
| Games | Gold | Silver | Bronze |
|---|---|---|---|
| 2028 Los Angeles | | | |

== Participating nations ==
1904
- Canada (two teams)
- United States

1908
- Canada
- Great Britain

1928 (demonstration)
- Canada
- Great Britain
- United States

1932 (demonstration)
- Canada
- United States

1948 (demonstration)
- Great Britain
- United States

== See also ==
- Lacrosse at the World Games
- List of Olympic venues in discontinued events
- World Lacrosse
- World Lacrosse Championship
