= List of Jewish Olympic medalists =

Since the inception of the modern Olympic Games in 1896, Jewish athletes have taken part in both the Summer Olympics and the Winter Olympics. The following is a list of Jewish athletes who have won an Olympic medal in the modern games.

Under the criteria of this list, Olympic medalists must have or had at least one Jewish parent and must have identified as Jewish. If the player has converted to another religion before their Olympic achievements, they should not be listed. Similarly, if the player has converted to Judaism before their Olympic achievements, they should be included; if they converted afterwards, they should not be listed here.

== Summer Olympics ==
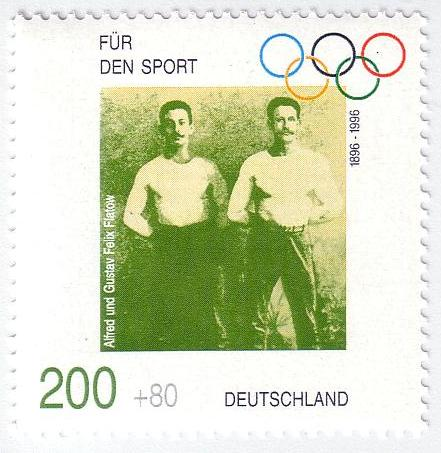
Alfred and Gustav Flatow on a German stamp; both were killed in the Holocaust

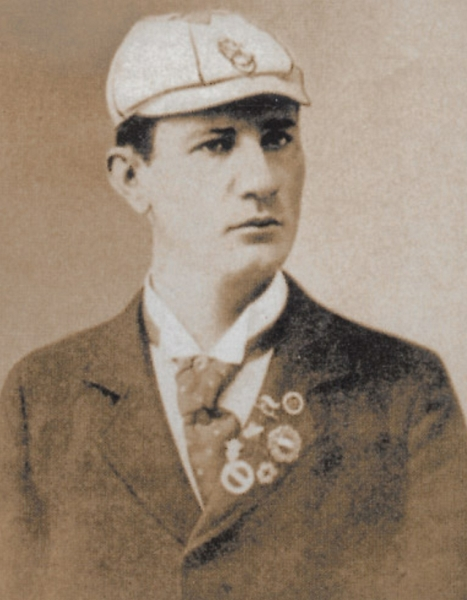
Paul Neumann

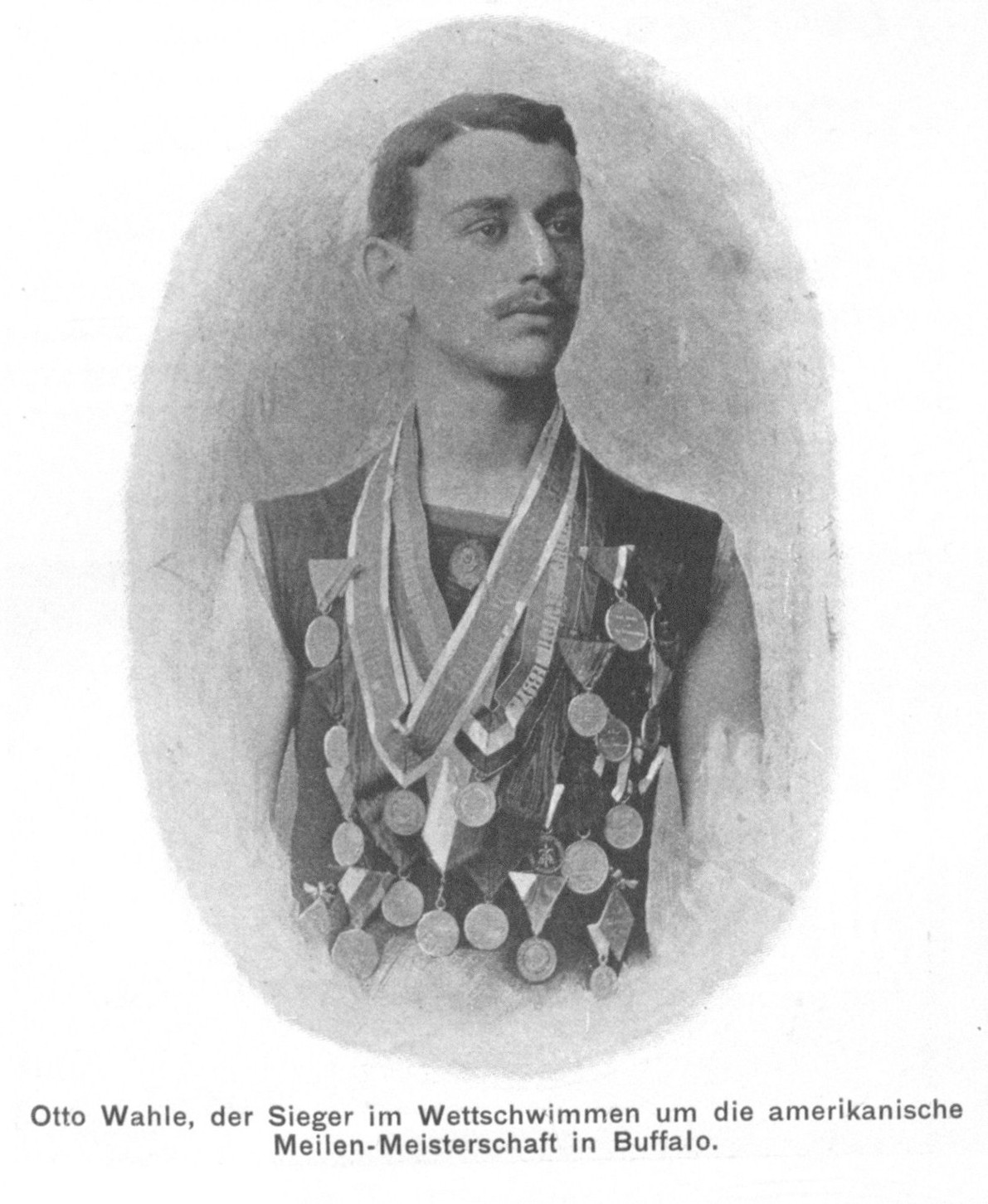
Otto Wahle

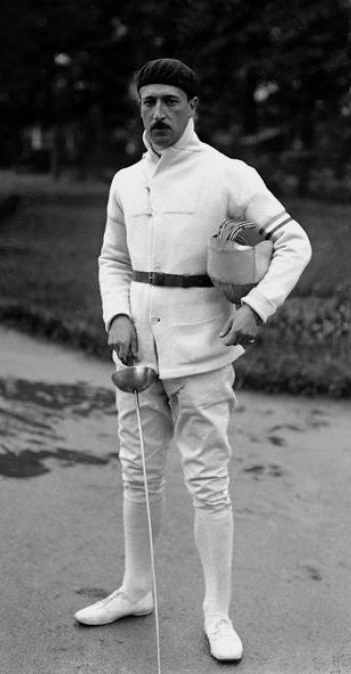
Alexandre Lippmann

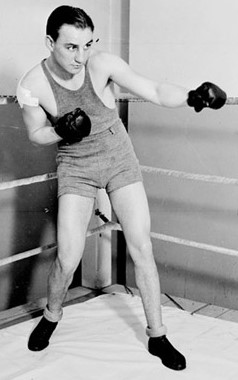
Jackie Fields

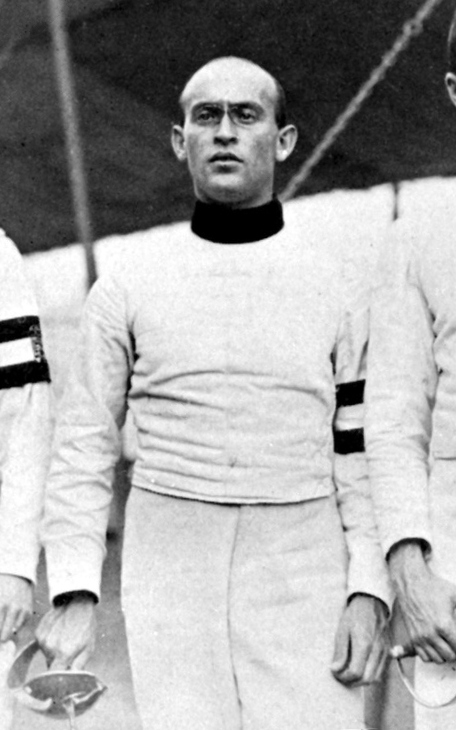
Jenő Fuchs

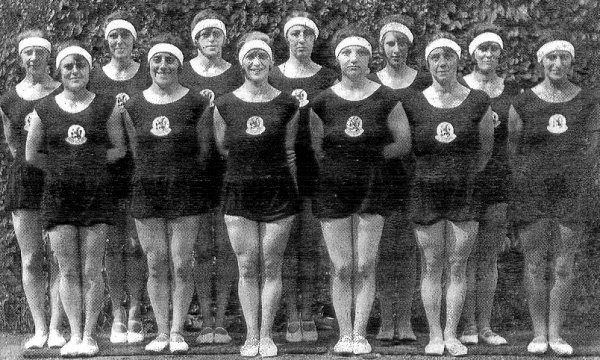
1928 Dutch women's gymnastics team, which had four Jewish members, three of whom were killed in the Holocaust

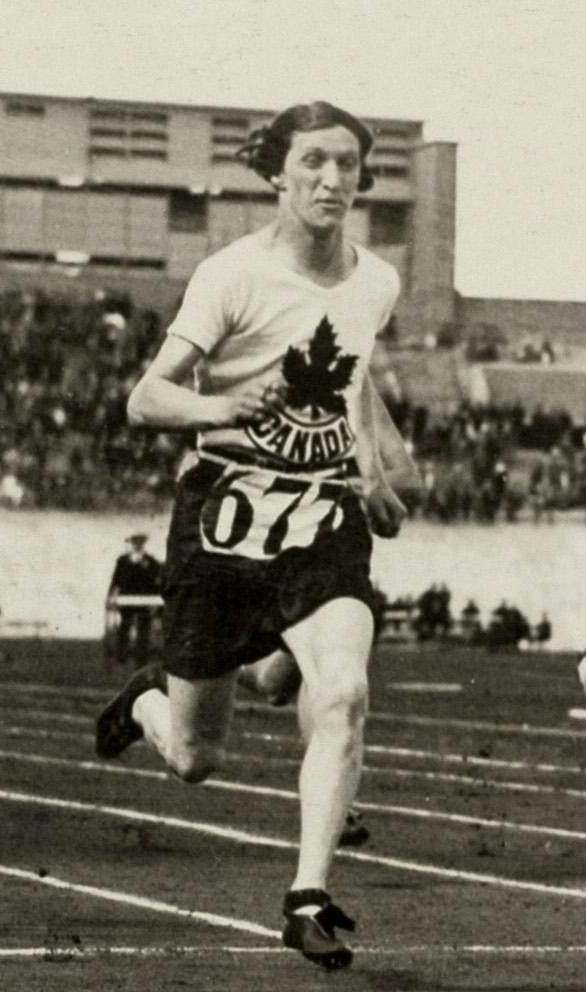
Bobbie Rosenfeld of Canada, gold medalist at the 1928 Amsterdam Olympics

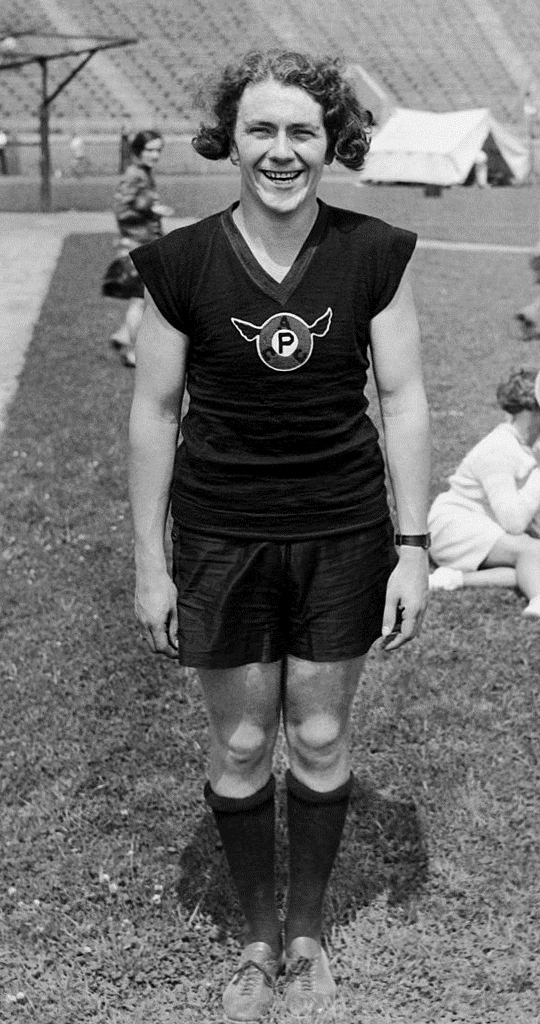
Lillian Copeland, track and field gold medalist at the 1932 Los Angeles Olympics

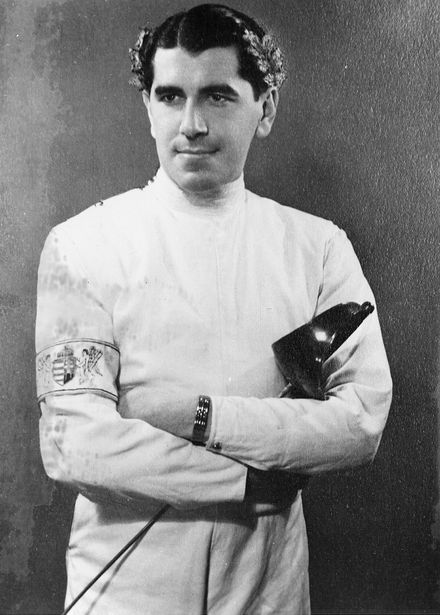
Endre Kabos, gold medalist at the 1936 Berlin Olympics who was killed in the Holocaust

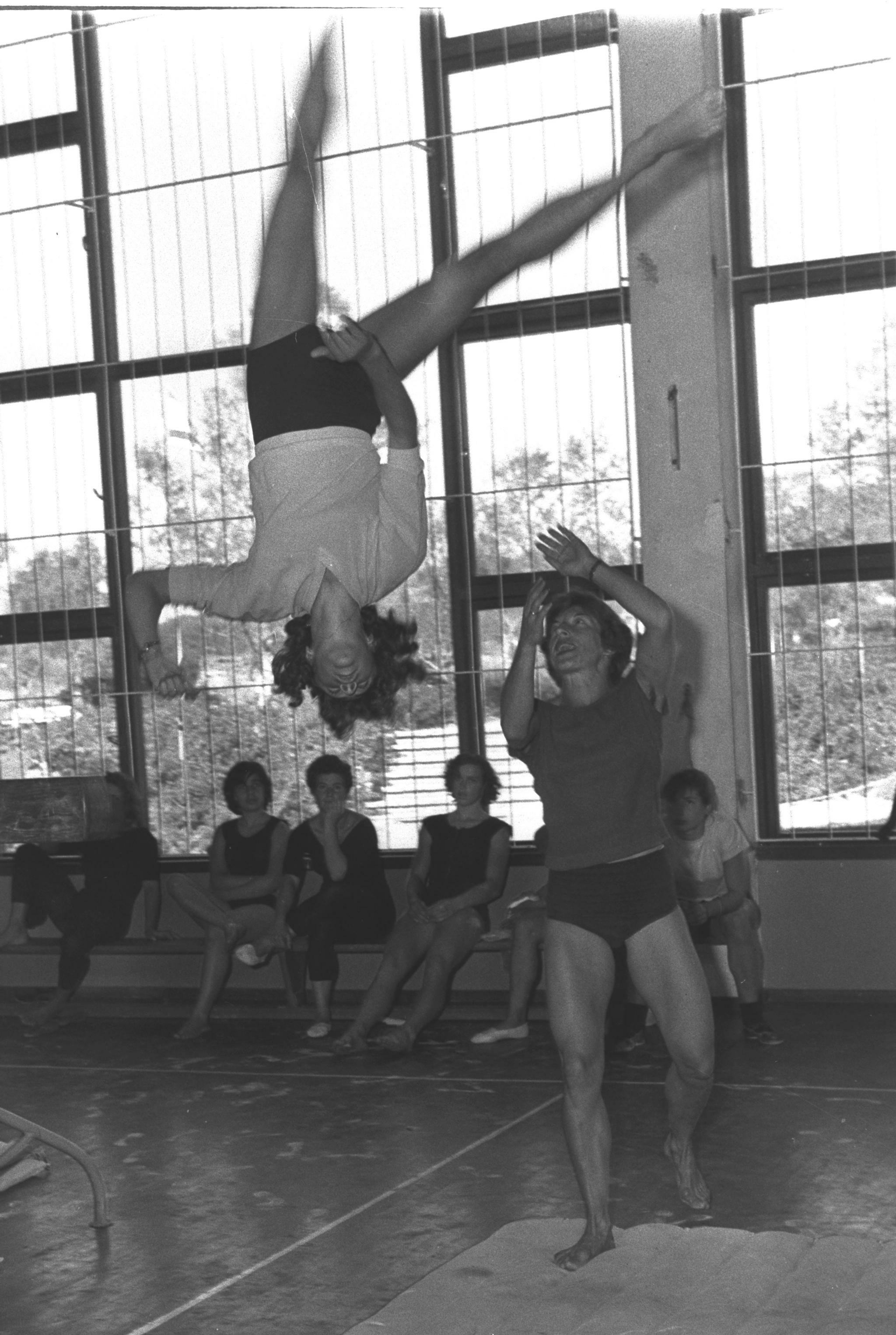
Ágnes Keleti, one of the most decorated Jewish Olympians in history

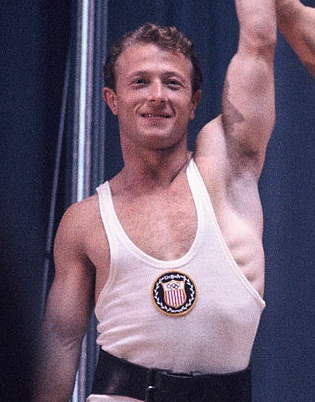
Isaac Berger

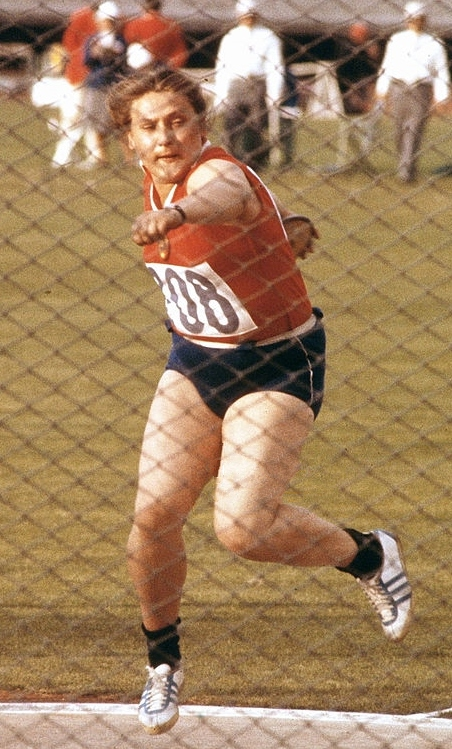
Tamara Press of the USSR

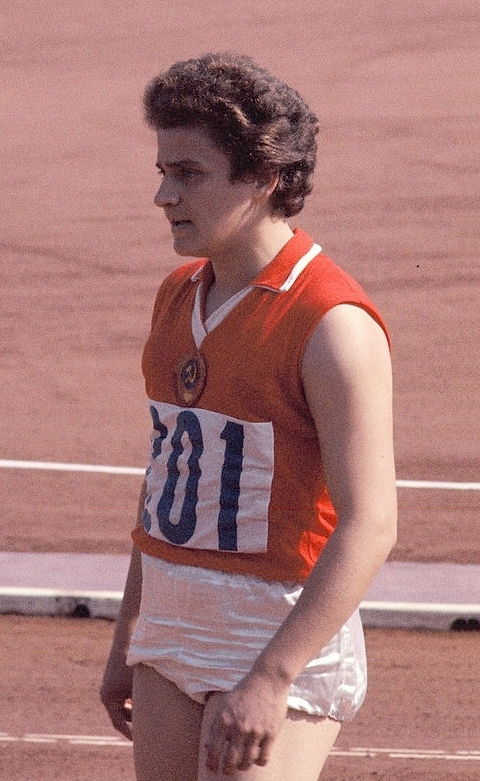
Irina Press of the USSR

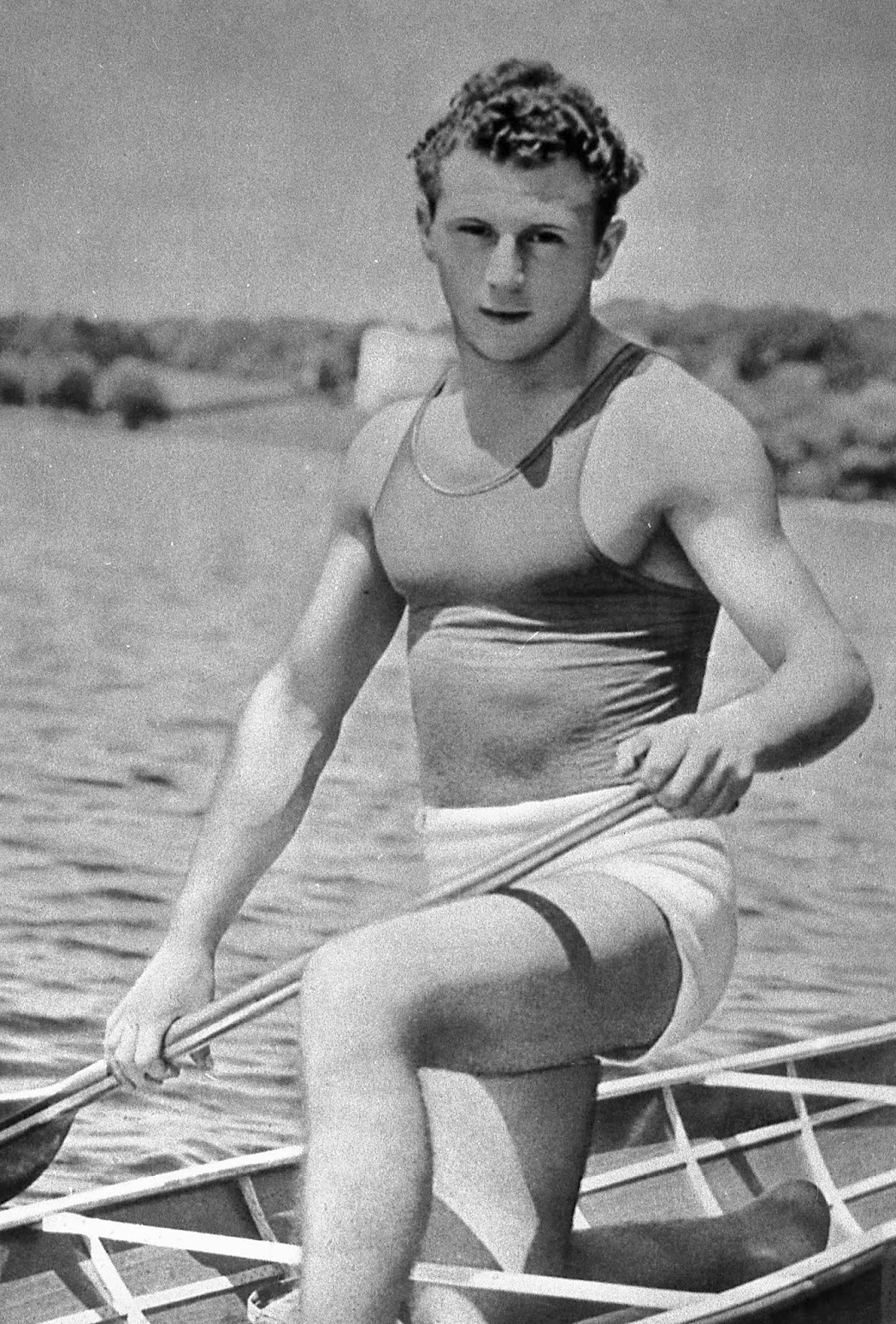
Leon Rotman

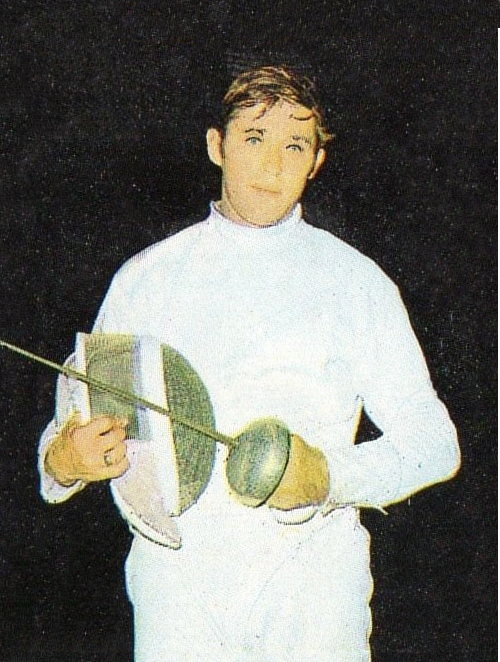
Grigory Kriss

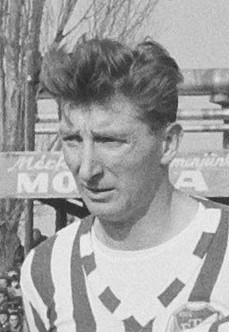
Árpád Orbán, Hungarian football player and Olympic gold medalist

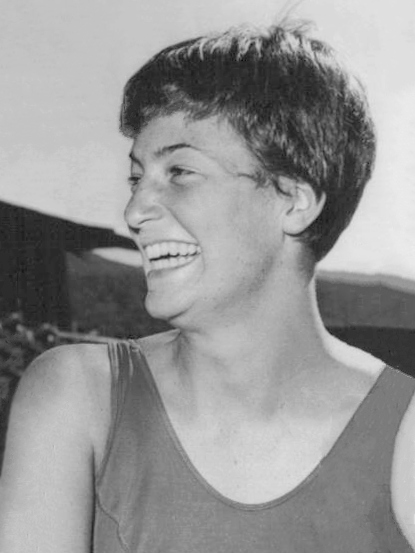
Marilyn Ramenofsky

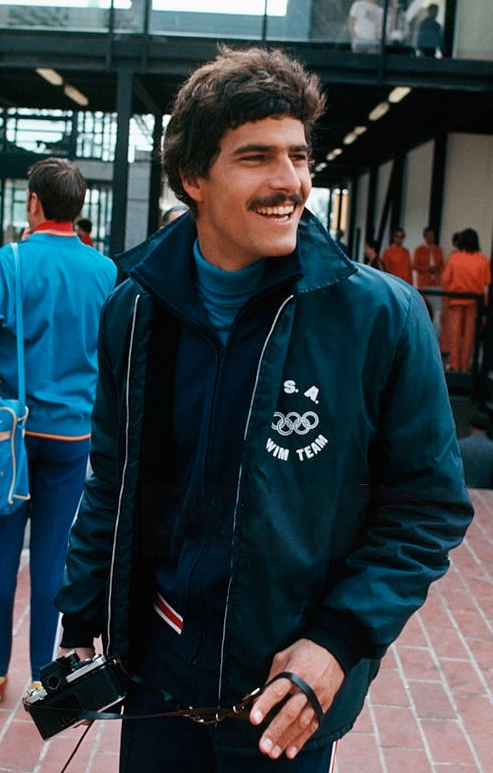
Mark Spitz, one of the most decorated Olympic swimmers

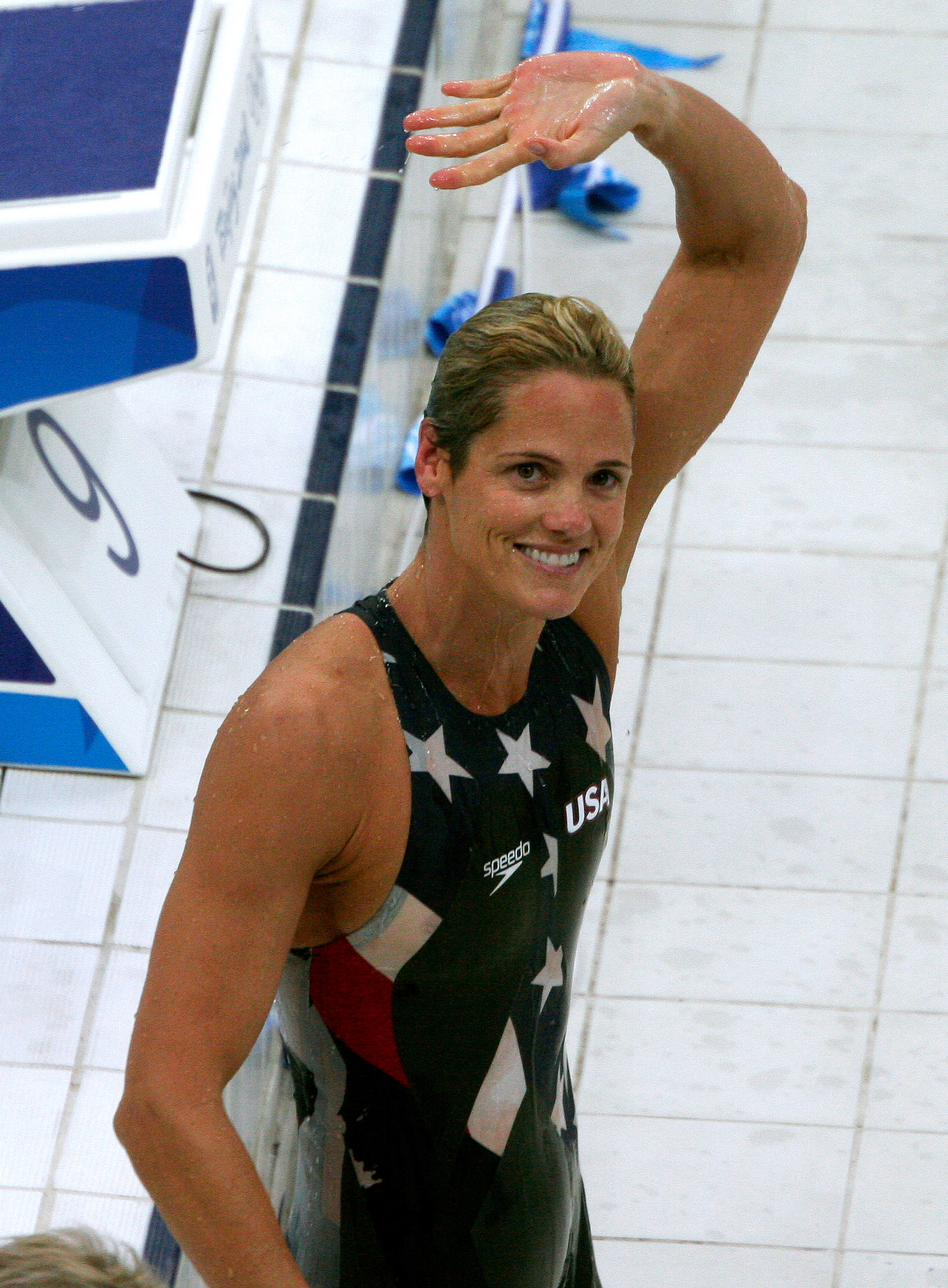
Dara Torres, twelve-time Olympic swimming medalist

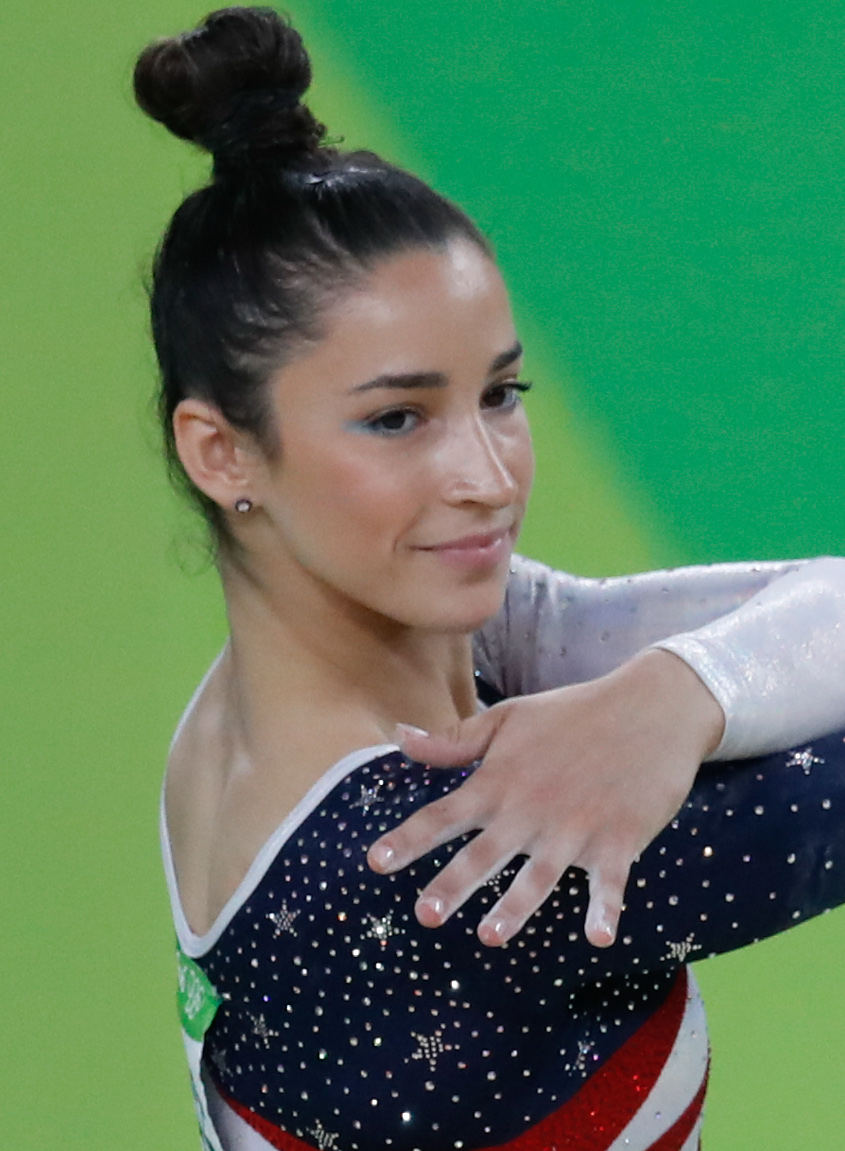
Aly Raisman, three-time Olympic gold medalist gymnast

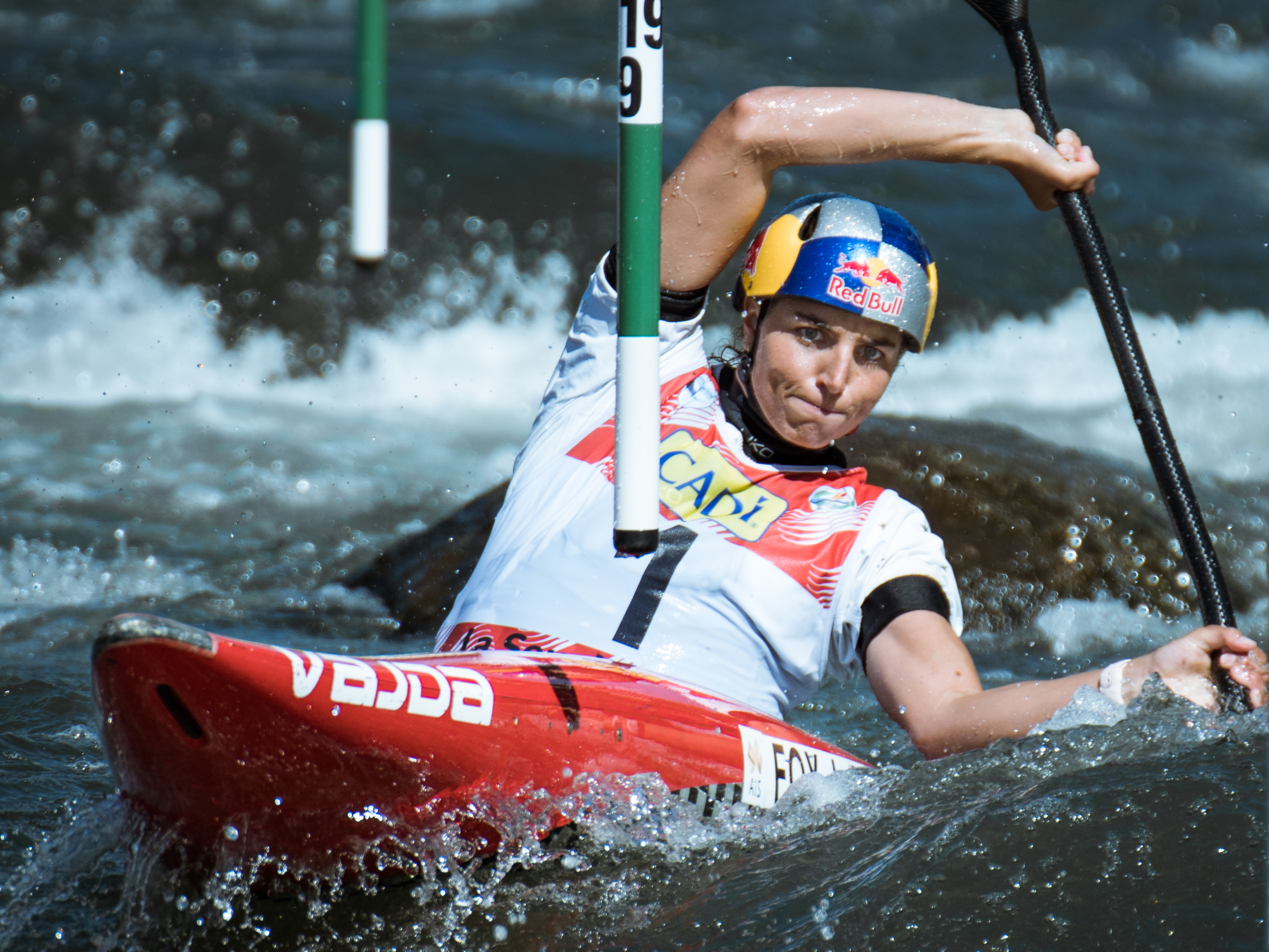
Jessica Fox, Gold medalist canoeist

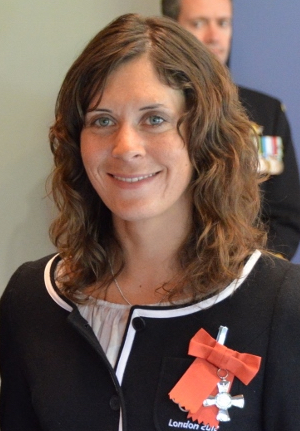
Jo Aleh, Gold medalist sailor for New Zealand

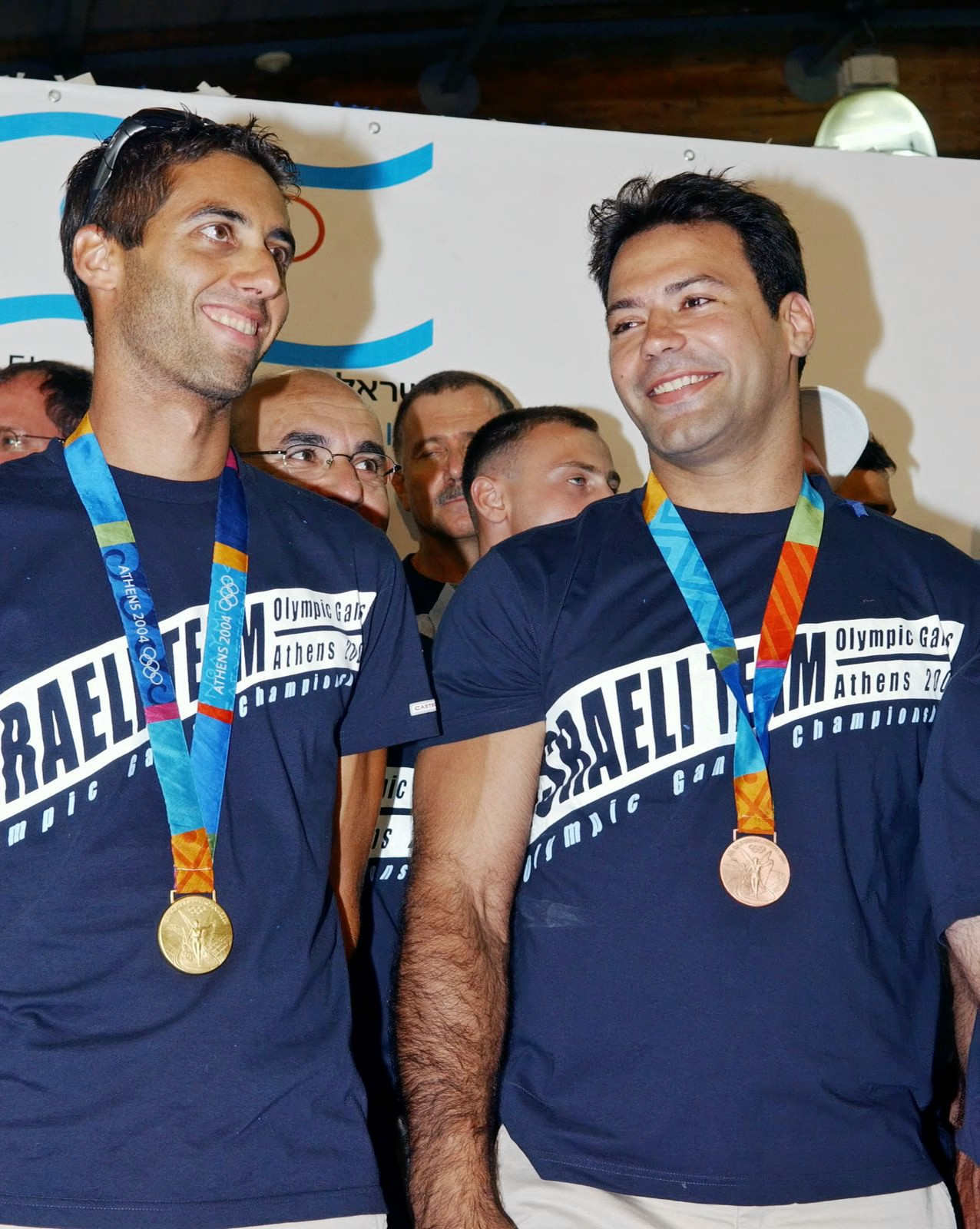
Gal Friedman, Israel's first Olympic gold medalist (in windsurfing), and Ariel Ze'evi, bronze medalist in judo

=== 1896 Athens ===
Gold

- Alfred Flatow, Germany, gymnastics
  - parallel bars
  - gymnastics, team parallel bars
  - gymnastics, team horizontal bar
- Gustav Felix Flatow, Germany, gymnastics
  - team parallel bars
  - team horizontal bar
- Alfréd Hajós, Hungary, swimming
  - 100-meter freestyle
  - 1,500-meter freestyle
- Paul Neumann, Austria, swimming
  - 500-meter freestyle

Silver

- Alfred Flatow, Germany, gymnastics
  - horizontal bar
- Otto Herschmann, Austria, swimming
  - 100-meter freestyle

=== 1900 Paris ===
Gold

- Meyer Prinstein, USA, athletics
  - triple jump

Silver

- Jean Bloch, France
  - soccer
- Henri Cohen, Belgium
  - water polo
- Meyer Prinstein, USA, athletics
  - long jump
- Otto Wahle, Austria, swimming
  - 1000-meter freestyle
  - 200-meter obstacle race

Bronze

- Siegfried Flesch, Austria, fencing
  - individual saber

=== 1904 St. Louis ===
Gold

- Samuel Berger, USA, boxing
  - heavyweight
- Meyer Prinstein, USA, athletics
  - long jump
  - triple jump

Silver

- Daniel Frank, USA, athletics
  - long jump
- Philip Hess, USA
  - lacrosse
- Albert Lehman, USA
  - lacrosse

Bronze

- Otto Wahle, Austria, swimming
  - 400-meter freestyle

=== 1908 London ===
Gold

- Dezsö Földes, Hungary, fencing
  - team saber
- Jenő Fuchs, Hungary, fencing
  - individual saber
  - team saber
- Oszkár Gerde, Hungary, fencing
  - team saber
- Alexandre Lippmann, France, fencing
  - team épée
- Jean Stern, France, fencing
  - team épée
- Richard Weisz, Hungary, Greco-Roman wrestling
  - heavyweight
- Lajos Werkner, Hungary, fencing
  - team saber

Silver

- Harald Bohr, Denmark
  - soccer
- Alexandre Lippmann, France, fencing
  - individual épée
- József Munk, Hungary, swimming
  - 4x200-meter freestyle relay
- Edgar Seligman, Great Britain, fencing
  - team épée
- Harry Simon, USA, shooting
  - free rifle
- Barney Solomon, Great Britain (Ireland)
  - rugby
- Bert Solomon, Great Britain (Ireland)
  - rugby
- Imre Zachar, Hungary, swimming
  - 4x200-meter freestyle relay

Bronze

- Odon Bodor, Hungary, athletics
  - 1,600-meter relay
- Clare Jacobs, USA, athletics
  - pole vault
- Otto Scheff, Austria, swimming
  - 400-meter freestyle

=== 1912 Stockholm ===
Gold

- Dezsö Földes, Hungary, fencing
  - team saber
- Jenö Fuchs, Hungary, fencing
  - individual saber
  - team saber
- Oszkár Gerde, Hungary, fencing
  - team saber
- David Jacobs, Great Britain, athletics
  - 4×100 m relay
- Jacques Ochs, Belgium, fencing
  - team épée
- Gaston Salmon, Belgium, fencing
  - team épée
- Lajos Werkner, Hungary, fencing
  - team saber

Silver

- Albert Bogen, Austria, fencing
  - team saber
- Samu Foti, Hungary, gymnastics
  - team combined exercises
- Imre Gellert, Hungary, gymnastics
  - team combined exercises
- Abel Kiviat, USA, athletics
  - 1,500-meter run
- Alvah Meyer, USA, athletics
  - 100-meter dash
- Ivan Osiier, Denmark, fencing
  - individual épée
- Felix Pipes, Austria, tennis
  - men's doubles
- Edgar Seligman, Great Britain, fencing
  - team épée

Bronze

- Margarete Adler, Austria, swimming
  - 4x100-meter freestyle relay
- Otto Herschmann, Austria, fencing
  - team saber
- Klara Milch, Austria, swimming
  - 4x100-meter freestyle relay
- Josephine Sticker, Austria, swimming
  - 4x100-meter freestyle relay

=== 1920 Antwerp ===
Gold

- Samuel Mosberg, USA, boxing
  - lightweight

Silver

- Gerard Blitz, Belgium
  - water polo
- Maurice Blitz, Belgium
  - water polo
- Samuel Gerson, USA, freestyle wrestling
  - featherweight
- Alexandre Lippmann, France, fencing
  - individual épée

Bronze

- Gerard Blitz, Belgium, swimming
  - 100-meter backstroke
- Moe Herscovitch, Canada, boxing
  - middleweight
- Alexandre Lippmann, France, fencing
  - team épée
- Frederick Meyer, USA, freestyle wrestling
  - heavyweight

=== 1924 Paris ===
Gold

- Harold Abrahams, Great Britain, athletics
  - 100-meter dash
- Louis Clarke, USA, athletics
  - 4X100-meter relay
- Jackie Fields, USA, boxing
  - featherweight
- Elias Katz, Finland, athletics
  - 3,000-meter team cross-country
- Alexandre Lippmann, France, fencing
  - team épée

Silver

- Harold Abrahams, Great Britain, athletics
  - 4X100-meter relay
- Gerard Blitz, Belgium
  - water polo
- Maurice Blitz, Belgium
  - water polo
- János Garay, Hungary, fencing
  - team saber
- Alfréd Hajós, Hungary, Olympic art competition
  - stadium design
- Elias Katz, Finland, athletics
  - 3,000-meter individual steeplechase
- Dezső Lauber, Hungary, Olympic art competition
  - stadium design

Bronze

- János Garay, Hungary, fencing
  - individual saber
- Sidney Jelinek, USA, rowing
  - coxed-fours
- Uberto De Morpurgo, Italy, tennis
  - men's singles

=== 1928 Amsterdam ===
Gold

- Estella Agsteribbe, Netherlands, women's gymnastics
  - team combined exercises
- János Garay, Hungary, fencing
  - team saber
- Sándor Gombos, Hungary, fencing
  - team saber
- Hans Haas, Austria, weightlifting
  - lightweight
- Elka de Levie, Netherlands, women's gymnastics
  - team combined exercises
- Ferenc Mező, Hungary, Olympic art competition
  - epic works
- Helena Nordheim, Netherlands, women's gymnastics
  - team combined exercises
- Attila Petschauer, Hungary, fencing
  - team saber
- Anna Polak, Netherlands, women's gymnastics
  - team combined exercises
- Bobbie Rosenfeld, Canada, athletics
  - 4X100-meter relay
- Jud Simons, Netherlands, women's gymnastics
  - team combined exercises

Silver

- Istvan Barta, Hungary
  - water polo
- Lillian Copeland, USA, athletics
  - discus throw
- Attila Petschauer, Hungary, fencing
  - individual saber
- Fanny Rosenfeld, Canada, athletics
  - 100-meter dash

Bronze

- Harold Devine, USA, boxing
  - featherweight
- Harry Isaacs, South Africa, boxing
  - bantamweight
- Samuel Rabin, Great Britain, freestyle wrestling
  - middleweight
- Edward Smouha, Great Britain, athletics
  - 4X100-meter relay

=== 1932 Los Angeles ===
Gold

- Istvan Barta, Hungary
  - water polo
- Gyorgy Brody, Hungary
  - water polo
- Lillian Copeland, USA, athletics
  - discus throw
- George Gulack, USA, gymnastics
  - flying rings
- Endre Kabos, Hungary, fencing
  - team saber
- Attila Petschauer, Hungary, fencing
  - team saber
- Miklós Sárkány, Hungary, water polo

Silver

- Philip Erenberg, USA, gymnastics
  - Indian clubs
- Hans Haas, Austria, weightlifting
  - lightweight
- Peter Jaffe, Great Britain, yachting
  - star-class
- Károly Kárpáti, Hungary, freestyle wrestling
  - lightweight
- Abraham Kurland, Denmark, Greco-Roman wrestling
  - lightweight
- Ruth Miller, USA, Olympic art competition
  - graphic art

Bronze

- Nathan Bor, USA, boxing
  - lightweight
- Nickolaus Hirschl, Austria
  - freestyle wrestling, heavyweight
  - Greco-Roman wrestling, heavyweight
- Endre Kabos, Hungary, fencing
  - individual saber
- Albert Schwartz, USA, swimming
  - 100-meter freestyle
- László Szabados, Hungary, swimming
  - 4x200-meter freestyle relay
- András Székely, Hungary, swimming
  - 4x200-meter freestyle relay

=== 1936 Berlin ===
Gold

- Sam Balter, USA
  - basketball
- György Bródy, Hungary
  - water polo
- Robert Fein, Austria, weightlifting
  - lightweight
- Endre Kabos, Hungary, fencing
  - individual saber
  - team saber
- Károly Kárpáti, Hungary, freestyle wrestling
  - lightweight
- Miklós Sárkány, Hungary
  - water polo

Silver

- Viktor Kalisch, Austria
  - kayak pairs, 1000-meters
- Irving Meretzky, Canada
  - basketball

Bronze

- Gerard Blitz, Belgium
  - water polo

=== 1948 London ===
Gold

- Frank Spellman, USA
  - weightlifting, middleweight
- Henry Wittenberg, USA
  - freestyle wrestling, light-heavyweight
- Wally Wolf, USA
  - swimming, 4x200 freestyle relay

Silver

- Steve Seymour, USA
  - athletics, javelin throw

Bronze

- Éva Földes, Hungary
  - Olympic art competition, epic works
- Jim Fuchs, USA
  - athletics, shot put
- George Worth, USA
  - fencing, team saber

=== 1952 Helsinki ===
Gold

- Robert Antal, Hungary
  - water polo
- Sándor Geller, Hungary
  - soccer
- Maria Gorokhovskaya, USSR, gymnastics
  - all-around individual exercises
  - team combined exercises
- Boris Gurevitsch, USSR, Greco-Roman wrestling
  - flyweight
- Ágnes Keleti, Hungary, gymnastics
  - floor exercises
- Claude Netter, France
  - fencing, team foil
- Mikhail Perelman, USSR
  - gymnastics, team combined exercises
- Yakov Punkin, USSR
  - wrestling, Greco-Roman featherweight
- Eva Székely, Hungary
  - swimming, 200-meter breaststroke
- Judit Temes, Hungary
  - 4x100-meter relay
- Galina Urbanovich, USSR
  - gymnastics, team all-around
- Wally Wolf, USA
  - swimming, 4x200 freestyle relay

Silver

- Leonid Gissen, USSR
  - rowing, eight-oared shell with coxswain
- Maria Gorokhovskaya, USSR, gymnastics
  - vault
  - asymmetrical bars
  - balance beam
  - floor exercises
  - team exercises with portable apparatus
- Ágnes Keleti, Hungary, gymnastics
  - team combined exercises
- Aleksandr Moiseyev, USSR
  - basketball
- Grigory Novak, USSR
  - weightlifting, middle-heavyweight
- Galina Urbanovich, USSR
  - gymnastics, team portable apparatus
- Henry Wittenberg, USA
  - freestyle wrestling, light-heavyweight

Bronze

- Jim Fuchs, USA
  - athletics, shot put
- Ágnes Keleti, Hungary, gymnastics
  - asymmetrical bars
  - team exercises with portable
  - apparatus
- Herbert Klein, Germany
  - swimming, 200 m breaststroke
- Judit Temes, Hungary
  - swimming, 100-meter freestyle
- Lev Weinstein, USSR
  - shooting, free rifle

=== 1956 Melbourne ===
Gold

- Isaac Berger, USA
  - weightlifting, featherweight
- László Fábián, Hungary
  - kayak pairs, 10,000-meters
- Ágnes Keleti, Hungary, gymnastics
  - asymmetrical bars
  - floor exercises
  - balance beam
  - team exercise with portable apparatus
- Aliz Kertész, Hungary, gymnastics
  - team exercise with portable apparatus
- Alfred Kuchevsky, USSR
  - ice hockey
- Boris Razinsky, USSR
  - soccer
- Leon Rotman, Romania, canoe
  - 1,000-meter Canadian singles
  - 10,000-meter Canadian singles
- Igor Rybak, USSR
  - weightlifting, lightweight

Silver

- Ágnes Keleti, Hungary, gymnastics
  - individual combined exercises
  - team combined exercises
- Aliz Kertész, Hungary
  - gymnastics, team combined exercises
- Claude Netter, France
  - fencing, team foil
- Eva Székely, Hungary
  - Swimming, 200-meter breaststroke

Bronze

- Yves Dreyfus, France
  - fencing, team épée
- Imre Farkas, Hungary
  - canoe, 10,000-meter Canadian pairs
- Boris Goikhman, USSR
  - water polo
- Armand Mouyal, France
  - fencing, team épée
- David Tyschler, USSR
  - fencing, team saber

=== 1960 Rome ===
Gold

- Leonid Geishtor, USSR
  - canoe, Canadian pairs 1000m,
- Mark Midler, USSR
  - fencing, team foil
- Irina Press, USSR
  - track & field, 80 m hurdles
- Tamara Press, USSR
  - track & field, shot-put
- Gyula Török, Hungary
  - boxing, flyweight

Silver

- Isaac Berger, USA
  - weightlifting, featherweight
- Boris Goikhman, USSR
  - water polo
- Allan Jay, Great Britain, fencing
  - individual épée
  - team épée
- Jean Klein, France
  - rowing, coxed-fours
- Guy Nosbaum, France
  - rowing, coxed-fours
- Vladimir Portnoy, USSR, gymnastics
  - team combined exercises
- Tamara Press, USSR
  - track & field, discus

Bronze

- Albert Axelrod, USA
  - fencing, individual foil
- Moysés Blás, Brazil
  - basketball
- Imre Farkas, Hungary
  - canoe, 1,000-meter Canadian pairs
- Klára Fried-Bánfalvi, Hungary
  - kayak, 500-meter pairs
- Robert Halperin, USA
  - yachting, Star-class
- Vladimir Portnoy, USSR
  - gymnastics, long horse vault
- Leon Rotman, Romania
  - canoe, 1,000-meter Canadian singles
- David Segal, Great Britain
  - athletics, 4x100-meter relay

=== 1964 Tokyo ===
Gold

- Gerry Ashworth, USA
  - athletics, 4X100-meter relay
- Larry Brown, USA
  - basketball
- Boris Dubrovskiy, USSR
  - rowing, double sculls
- Tamás Gábor, Hungary
  - fencing, team épée
- Irena Szewińska, Poland, athletics
  - 4x100-meter relay
- Grigory Kriss, USSR
  - fencing, individual épée
- Mark Midler, USSR
  - fencing, team foil
- Georgy Mondzolevski, USSR
  - volleyball
- Árpád Orbán, Hungary
  - soccer
- Irina Press, USSR, track & field
  - pentathlon
- Tamara Press, USSR, track & field
  - shot-put
  - discuss
- Mark Rakita, USSR
  - fencing, team saber

Silver

- Nelli Abramova, USSR
  - volleyball
- Isaac Berger, USA
- weightlifting, featherweight
- Irena Szewińska, Poland, athletics
  - 200-meter dash
  - long jump
- Marilyn Ramenofsky, USA
  - swimming, 400-meter freestyle

Bronze

- Ārons Bogoļubovs, USSR
  - judo, lightweight
- Jim Bregman, USA
  - judo, middleweight
- Yves Dreyfus, France
  - fencing, team épée

=== 1968 Mexico City ===
Gold

- Boris Gurevich, USSR
  - freestyle wrestling middleweight
- Irena Szewińska, Poland, athletics
  - 200-meter dash
- Valentin Mankin, USSR
  - yachting, Finn class
- Georgy Mondzolevski, USSR
  - Volleyball
- Mark Rakita, USSR
  - fencing, team saber
- Mark Spitz, USA, swimming
  - 400-meter freestyle relay
  - 800-meter freestyle relay
- Yury Vengerovsky, USSR
  - Volleyball
- Eduard Vinokurov, USSR
  - fencing, team saber
- Victor Zinger, USSR
  - ice hockey

Silver

- Semyon Belits-Geiman, USSR
  - swimming, 4 × 100 m freestyle relay
- Grigory Kriss, USSR, fencing
  - individual épée
  - team épée
- Mark Rakita, USSR
  - fencing, individual saber
- Mark Spitz, USA, swimming
  - 100-meter butterfly
- Iosif Vitebskiy, USSR
  - fencing, team épée

Bronze

- Semyon Belits-Geiman, USSR
  - swimming, 4 × 200 m freestyle relay
- Irena Szewińska, Poland, athletics
  - 100-meter dash
- Naum Prokupets, USSR
  - canoeing, 1000-m Canadian pairs
- Mark Spitz, USA, swimming
  - 100-meter freestyle
- Peter Bakonyi, Hungary
  - fencing, team sabre

=== 1972 Munich ===
Gold

- György Gedó, Hungary
  - boxing, light flyweight
- Valentin Mankin, USSR
  - yachting, tempest class
- Faina Melnik, USSR
  - athletics, discus throw
- Mark Spitz, USA, swimming
  - 100-meter freestyle
  - 200-meter freestyle
  - 100-meter butterfly
  - 200-meter butterfly
  - 400-meter freestyle relay
  - 400-meter medley relay
  - 800-meter freestyle relay

Silver

- Andrea Gyarmati, Hungary, swimming
  - 100-meter backstroke
- Mark Rakita, USSR
  - fencing, team saber
- Neal Shapiro, USA
  - equestrian, team jumping
- Eduard Vinokurov, USSR
  - fencing, team saber

Bronze

- Peter Asch, USA
  - water polo
- Yefim Chulak, USSR
  - volleyball
- Don Cohan, USA
  - yachting, Dragon-class
- Andrea Gyarmati, Hungary, swimming
  - 100-meter butterfly
- Irena Szewińska, Poland, athletics
  - 200-meter dash
- Neal Shapiro, USA
  - equestrian, individual jumping
- Peter Bakonyi, Hungary
  - fencing, team sabre

=== 1976 Montreal ===
Gold

- Ernest Grunfeld, USA
  - basketball
- Irena Szewińska, Poland, athletics
  - 400-meter run
- Valery Shary, USSR
  - Weightlifting, light heavyweight
- Eduard Vinokurov, USSR
  - fencing, team saber

Silver

- Yefim Chulak, USSR
  - volleyball
- Natalia Kushnir, USSR
  - volleyball
- Nancy Lieberman, USA
  - basketball
- Valentin Mankin, USSR
  - yachting, tempest class

Bronze

- Leonid Buryak, USSR
  - soccer
- Edith Master, USA
  - equestrian team dressage
- Wendy Weinberg, USA
  - swimming, 800-meter freestyle
- Victor Zilberman, Romania
  - boxing, welterweight

=== 1980 Moscow ===
Gold

- Valentin Mankin, USSR
  - yachting, star class

Silver

- Svetlana Krachevskaya, USSR
  - athletics, shot put

=== 1984 Los Angeles ===
Gold

- Carina Benninga, Netherlands
  - field hockey
- Mitch Gaylord, USA, gymnastics
  - gymnastics, team
- Dara Torres, USA, swimming
  - 400-meter freestyle relay.

Silver

- Daniel Adler, Brazil
  - yachting, sailing class
- Robert Berland, USA
  - judo, middleweight
- Mitch Gaylord, USA, gymnastics
  - vaulting
- Bernard Rajzman, Brazil
  - volleyball

Bronze

- Mark Berger, Canada
  - judo, heavyweight
- Mitch Gaylord, USA, gymnastics
  - rings
  - Parallel bars

=== 1988 Seoul ===
Gold

- Mike Milchin, USA
  - baseball, exhibition event
- Yelena Shushunova, USSR, gymnastics
  - all-around
  - team

Silver

- Yelena Shushunova, USSR
  - balance beam

Bronze

- Seth Bauer, USA
  - rowing, eight-oared shell with coxswain
- Carina Benninga, Netherlands
  - field hockey
- Brad Gilbert, USA
  - tennis, singles
- Yelena Shushunova, USSR
  - gymnastics, uneven bars
- Dara Torres, USA, swimming
  - 4 × 100 m freestyle relay
  - 4 × 100 m medley relay

=== 1992 Barcelona ===
Gold

- Valery Belenky, CIS/Azerbaijan
  - gymnastics, team combined exercises
- Joe Jacobi, USA
  - canoeing, Canadian slalom pairs
- Tatiana Lysenko, CIS/Russia, gymnastics
  - balance beam
  - team combined exercises
- Dara Torres, USA, swimming
  - 4 × 100 m freestyle relay

Silver

- Yael Arad, Israel
  - judo, light middleweight,
- Avital Selinger, Netherlands
  - volleyball

Bronze

- Valery Belenky, CIS/Azerbaijan
  - gymnastics, individual combined exercises
- Dan Greenbaum, USA
  - volleyball
- Tatiana Lysenko, CIS/Russia
  - gymnastics, horse vault
- Oren Smadja, Israel
  - Judo, lightweight
- Kerri Strug, USA, gymnastics
  - team combined exercises
- Robert Dover, USA
  - equestrian, team dressage

=== 1996 Atlanta ===
Gold

- Sergei Sharikov, Russia
  - fencing, team saber
- Kerri Strug, USA, gymnastics
  - team combined exercises

Silver

- Yana Batyrshina, Russia
  - rhythmic gymnastics
- Sergei Sharikov, Russia
  - fencing, individual sabre

Bronze

- Myriam Fox-Jerusalmi, France
  - canoe, K-1 slalom
- Gal Fridman, Israel
  - sailing
- Mariya Mazina, Russia
  - fencing, women team épée
- Robert Dover, USA
  - equestrian, team dressage

=== 2000 Sydney ===
Gold

- Anthony Ervin, USA, swimming
  - 50-meter freestyle
- Lenny Krayzelburg, USA, swimming
  - 100-meter backstroke
  - 200-meter backstroke
  - 4x100-meter medley relay
- Dara Torres, USA, swimming
  - 4 × 100 m freestyle relay
  - 4 × 100 m medley relay
- Maria Mazina, Russia
  - fencing, team épée
- Sergei Sharikov, Russia
  - fencing, team sabre

Silver

- Adriana Behar, Brazil
  - beach volleyball
- Anthony Ervin, USA, swimming
  - 400 m. freestyle relay
- Scott Goldblatt, USA, swimming
  - 800 m. freestyle relay
- Jason Lezak, USA, swimming
  - 400 m. freestyle relay
- Yulia Raskina, Belarus
  - rhythmic gymnastics
- Sara Whalean, USA
  - soccer

Bronze

- Robert Dover, USA
  - equestrian, team dressage
- Michael Kolganov, Israel
  - canoe/kayak, men K-1 500 m
- Dara Torres, USA, swimming
  - 50m Freestyle
  - 100m Freestyle
  - 100m Butterfly

=== 2004 Athens ===
Gold

- Gal Fridman, Israel
  - sailing
- Scott Goldblatt, USA
  - swimming 4X200 freestyle relay
- Lenny Krayzelburg, USA
  - swimming 4x100 medley relay
- Jason Lezak, USA, swimming
  - 4x100 medley relay
- Nicolás Massú, Chile
  - tennis, singles
  - tennis, men's doubles

Silver

- Adriana Behar, Brazil
  - beach volleyball
- Gavin Fingleson, Australia
  - baseball

Bronze

- Robert Dover, USA
  - riding, team dressage
- Sada Jacobson, USA
  - fencing, individual saber
- Deena Kastor, USA
  - athletics, marathon
- Jason Lezak, USA, swimming
  - 4x100 freestyle relay
- Sarah Poewe, Germany
  - swimming, 4x100 medley relay
- Sergei Sharikov, Russia
  - fencing, team saber
- Ariel Ze'evi, Israel
  - judo, 100 kg

=== 2008 Beijing ===
Gold

- Jason Lezak, USA, swimming
  - 4x100 freestyle relay
  - 4x100 medley relay
- Garrett Weber-Gale, US, swimming
  - 4x100 freestyle relay
  - 4x100 medley relay
- Ben Wildman-Tobriner, USA, swimming
  - 4x100 freestyle relay

Silver

- Vasyl Fedoryshyn, Ukraine
  - wrestling, 60 kg
- Sada Jacobson, USA
  - fencing, individual sabre
- Merrill Moses, USA
  - Water Polo
- Dara Torres, USA, swimming
  - 50m freestyle
  - 4 × 100 m freestyle
  - 4 × 100 m medley relay
- Josh West, Great Britain
  - rowing, eights

Bronze

- Sada Jacobson, USA
  - fencing, team sabre
- Gisele Kanevsky, Argentina
  - field hockey
- Jason Lezak, USA
  - swimming, 100m freestyle
- Shahar Tzuberi, Israel
  - windsurfing

=== 2012 London ===
Gold

- Aly Raisman, USA
  - individual floor exercise
  - gymnastics, team
- Jo Aleh, New Zealand
  - sailing, 470 class
- Nathan Cohen, New Zealand
  - rowing, double sculls

Silver

- Jessica Fox, Australia
  - canoeing, K-1
- Jason Lezak, USA
  - swimming, 4x100 relay

Bronze

- Aly Raisman, USA
  - gymnastics, balance beam
- Felipe Kitadai, Brazil
  - judo, extra-lightweight (60 kg)

=== 2016 Rio de Janeiro ===
Gold

- Anthony Ervin, USA, swimming
  - 50m freestyle
  - 4 × 100 m freestyle relay
- Aly Raisman, USA
  - gymnastics, team all-around

Silver

- Jo Aleh, New Zealand
  - sailing, 470 class
- Zoe De Toledo, Great Britain
  - rowing, coxed eight
- Aly Raisman, USA, gymnastics
  - individual all-around
  - individual floor exercises

Bronze

- Yarden Gerbi, Israel
  - judo, 63 kg
- Ori Sasson, Israel
  - judo, over 100 kg
- Jessica Fox, Australia
  - kayak, K1

=== 2020 Tokyo ===
Gold

- Linoy Ashram, Israel
  - Rhythmic Gymnastics
- Alix Klineman, USA
  - Beach Volleyball
- Artem Dolgopyat, Israel
  - Artistic Gymnastics
- Lilia Akhaimova, Russia
  - Gymnastics
- Jessica Fox, Australia
  - Kayak
- Sue Bird, USA
  - Basketball

Bronze

- Avishag Semberg, Israel
  - Taekwondo
- Timna Nelson-Levy, Israel
  - Mixed Judo Team
- Ori Sasson, Israel
  - Mixed Judo Team
- Li Kochman, Israel
  - Mixed Judo Team
- Gili Sharir, Israel
  - Mixed Judo Team
- Tohar Butbul, Israel
  - Mixed Judo Team
- Peter Paltchik, Israel
  - Mixed Judo Team
- Sagi Muki, Israel
  - Mixed Judo Team
- Raz Hershko, Israel
  - Mixed Judo Team

=== 2024 Paris ===
Gold

- Jessica Fox, Australia
  - Kayak
  - canoe
- Noemie Fox, Australia
  - Kayak
- Jackie Dubrovich, USA
  - Foil fencing, team
- Maia Weintraub, USA
  - Foil fencing, team
- Amit Elor, USA
  - Freestyle wrestling
- Tom Reuveny, Israel
  - windsurfing

Silver

- Artem Dolgopyat, Israel
  - Artistic Gymnastics
- Raz Hershko, Israel
  - Judo +78kg
- Sharon Kantor, Israel
  - Windsurfing
- Inbar Lanir, Israel
  - Judo -78
- Claire Weinstein, USA
  - 4x200 freestyle swim relay

Bronze

- Nick Itkin, USA
  - foil fencing
- Sarah Levy, USA
  - Women's rugby
- Jemima Montag, Australia
  - 20-kilometer race walk
  - marathon mixed relay event
- Peter Paltchik, Israel
  - Judo +100kg

== Winter Olympics ==
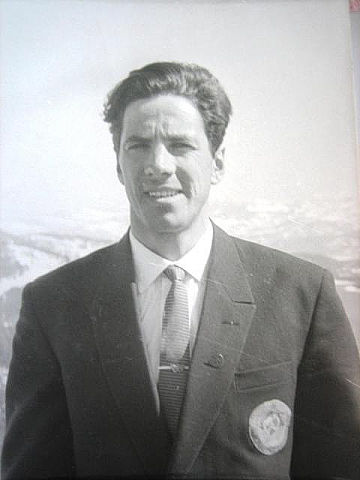
Rafayel Grach of the USSR

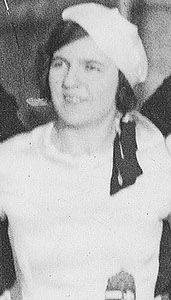
Emília Rotter

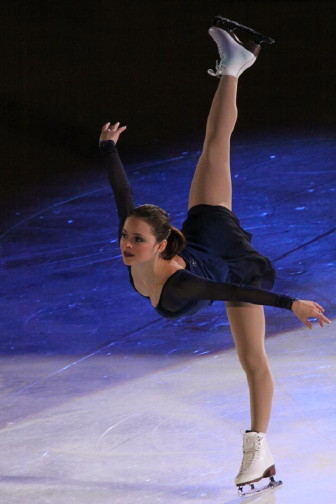
Sasha Cohen of the USA

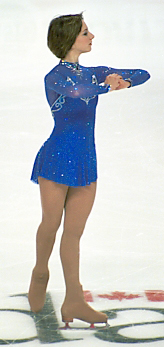
Sarah Hughes of the USA

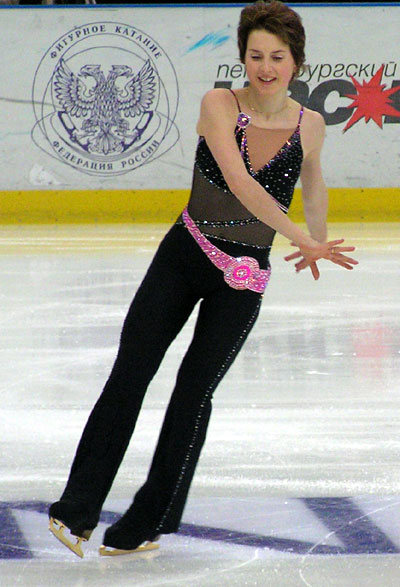
Irina Slutskaya

=== 1932 Lake Placid ===
Gold

- Irving Jaffee, USA, speed skating
  - 5,000-meter
  - 10,000-meter

Bronze

- Rudi Ball, Germany
  - ice hockey
- Emília Rotter, Hungary
  - figure skating, pairs
- László Szollás, Hungary
  - figure skating, pair

=== 1936 Garmisch-Partenkirchen ===
Silver

- Felix Kasper, Austria
  - figure skating

Bronze

- Emília Rotter, Hungary
  - figure skating, pairs
- László Szollás, Hungary
  - figure skating, pairs

=== 1956 Cort. d’Ampezzo ===
Silver

- Rafayel Grach, USSR
  - speed skating, 500-meter

=== 1960 Squaw Valley ===
Silver

- Alfred Kuchevsky, USSR
  - ice hockey

Bronze

- Rafayel Grach, USSR
  - speed skating, 500-meter

=== 1964 Innsbruck ===
Bronze

- Petra Burka, Canada
  - figure skating
- Vivian Joseph, USA
  - figure skating, mixed pairs
- Ronald Joseph, USA
  - figure skating, mixed pairs

=== 1968 Grenoble ===
Silver

- Alain Calmat, France
  - figure skating
- Alexandr Gorelik, USSR
  - figure skating, pairs

=== 1980 Lake Placid ===
Gold

- Gennady Karponosov, USSR
  - ice-dancing, pairs

=== 2002 Salt Lake City ===
Gold

- Sarah Hughes, USA
  - figure skating

Silver

- Ilya Averbukh, Russia
  - ice dancing, pairs
- Irina Slutskaya, Russia
  - figure skating

=== 2006 Turin ===
Silver

- Sasha Cohen, USA
  - figure skating
- Ben Agosto, USA
  - ice dancing
- Tanith Belbin, USA
  - ice dancing

Bronze

- Irina Slutskaya, Russia
  - figure skating

=== 2010 Vancouver ===
Gold

- Steve Mesler, USA
  - 4-man bob sled

=== 2014 Sochi ===
Bronze

- Jason Brown, USA
  - figure skating
- Dylan Moscovitch, Canada
  - figure skating
- Simon Shnapir, USA
  - figure skating

=== 2018 Pyeongchang ===
Bronze

- Arielle Gold, USA
  - Snowboarding

=== 2022 Beijing ===
Bronze

- Emery Lehman, USA
  - speed skating, Team pursuit

=== 2026 Milan ===
Gold

- Aerin Frankel, USA
  - ice hockey
- Jack Hughes, USA
  - ice hockey
- Quinn Hughes, USA
  - ice hockey
- Jeremy Swayman, USA
  - ice hockey

Silver

- Korey Dropkin, USA
  - mixed doubles curling
- Scotty James, Australia
  - snowboarding
- Emery Lehman, USA
  - speed skating, Team pursuit
- Kayle Osborne, Canada
  - ice hockey

== See also ==
- Antisemitism in the Olympic Games
- Nazi persecution of Jews during the 1936 Olympic Games
- Munich Massacre

Others

- Maccabiah Games, known as the "Jewish Olympics"
- List of Jews in sports
- International Jewish Sports Hall of Fame
