= John Flett =

John Flett may refer to:

- John Flett (geologist) (1869–1947), Scottish physician and geologist
- John Flett (rugby union) (born 1963), Australian rugby union player
- John Flett (fashion designer) (1963–1991), British fashion designer
- Jack Flett (John Flett, 1871–1932), Canadian lacrosse player
