= Philip Hess =

American lacrosse player

Medal record

Men's lacrosse

Representing United States

Olympic Games
| Silver medal – second place | 1904 St Louis | Team competition |

Philip Hess was an American lacrosse player who competed in the 1904 Summer Olympics. In 1904, as a member of the St. Louis Amateur Athletic Association, Hess won the silver medal in the lacrosse tournament. Hess was Jewish.

== See also ==
- List of Jewish Olympic medalists
