= Bill Isaacs =

Canadian lacrosse player (1914–1985)

Personal information
- Nationality: Canadian (Mohawk)
- Born: March 18, 1914 Six Nations of the Grand River, Brantford, Ontario, Canada
- Died: December 27, 1985 (aged 71)

Sport
- Position: Centre
- CLA teams: Hamilton Tigers, Rochester Iroquois, Haldimand Rifles Indians, Burlington, Hamilton-Burlington, Toronto Marlboros, Mimico-Brampton Combines, St. Catharines
- Pro career: 1930s–1949

Career highlights
- O.A.L.A. Senior A scoring title (1935, 1937, 1938, 1939, 1940, 1941, 1942); Jim Murphy Trophy (MVP) (1938); Mann Cup (1942, 1948); 11th in senior Canadian and professional lacrosse career statistics (777 goals, 467 assists)
- Canadian Lacrosse Hall of Fame, 1965 (charter member); Brantford & Area Sports Hall of Recognition (1984); Ontario Lacrosse Hall of Fame (2008); Hamilton Sports Hall of Fame (2011); Canada Sports Hall of Fame (2015)

Bill Isaacs (March 18, 1914 – December 27, 1985) was a Mohawk Canadian lacrosse player born near Brantford, Ontario on the Six Nations of the Grand River, the largest reserve of the First Nations. Box lacrosse was big in the 1930s and 1940s and Isaacs was identified as being perhaps its first superstar. He won the O.A.L.A. Senior A scoring title seven years between 1935 and 1942, and was on two Mann Cup winning teams in 1942 and 1948. He ended up prestigious as a standout amongst the most exceptional lacrosse contenders amid the 1930s and 1940s and a hotshot of box lacrosse, the indoor adaptation of the amusement. He won the Ontario Amateur Lacrosse Association Senior "A" scoring trophy 7 times in 8 years in the vicinity of 1935 and 1942 and in addition winning the 1938 MVP grant. His career statistics rank him 11th in senior Canadian and professional lacrosse. Former Canadian Football League commissioner Jake Gaudaur described Bill Isaacs as "one of the most outstanding players that ever played the game in the thirties and forties, when lacrosse was a very big sport in Canada." He has been inducted into various Canadian sports hall of fames.

Isaccs' father was Man Afraid of the Soap (also known as Freeman Joseph Isaacs), the 1904 Olympic bronze medalist in lacrosse.

== Major sports achievements and contributions ==
He learned the game on the Six Nations Indian reserve and played during the game's heyday in the 1930s and '40s for Hamilton Tigers and Rochester Iroquois when pro lacrosse regularly drew up to 6,000 people a game. He left the reserve when he was 17, playing professional lacrosse in the United States before returning to Canada to play on teams in various Ontario communities. In 1932, he and his brother Lance led the Haldimand Rifles Indians team to the Ontario Amateur Lacrosse Association (O.A.L.A.) Ontario Championship title in Intermediate Lacrosse. He won the O.A.L.A. Senior A scoring crown 7 times in 8 years from 1935 until 1942 (except for 1936). In 1938 he also won the Jim Murphy Trophy as the most valuable player in the league. Isaacs was a member of two Mann Cup winning teams - in 1942 with the Mimico-Brampton Combines and in 1948 with the Hamilton Tiger team. During his 346-game career, he scored enough goals (777) and assists (467) to be ranked 11th in senior Canadian and professional history. Isaacs was rated the best centres of all-time scoring 700 goals and 1100 points. He was inducted into the Canadian Lacrosse Hall of Fame as a charter member in 1965. He was also inducted into the Brantford & Area Sports Hall of Recognition (1984), the Ontario Lacrosse Hall of Fame (2008), the Hamilton Sports Hall of Fame (2011), and the Canada Sports Hall of Fame (2015).

== Contribution to Canadian sport ==
Box lacrosse made its debut in North America in 1931. Box lacrosse was an indoor version of the field game, and borrowed heavily from ice hockey, with team owners selling this sport as "summertime ice hockey. The rules committee made sure that box lacrosse looked and felt like ice hockey by dividing games into three 20-minute periods and by using hockey goal nets and NHL referees. Indigenous players had their own particular groups however were invited when box lacrosse turned into the superior type of the diversion in the 1930s. Six Nations' Bill Isaacs, who drove Hamilton Tigers to a Mann Glass (national senior title) in 1948, was the first superstar of "boxla.

Bill Isaacs had a lengthy and successful career, playing Senior A for parts of 15 seasons before finally hanging up his stick after the 1949 playoffs. His career included stints with: Burlington, Hamilton-Burlington, Toronto Marlboros, Hamilton Tigers, Mimico-Brampton Combines, and St. Catharines. This was a time in Canadian society when Aboriginal people had few opportunities to participate in mainstream sporting events, which were shaped by both racism and ethnocentric distortion; lacrosse, which was originally created within Aboriginal society, was one activity where Aboriginal athletes could excel and be celebrated in Canada.
