= Eduard Vinokurov =

Soviet fencer

Personal information
- Born: Эдуард Теодорович Винокуров; 30 October 1942 Baijansai, Kazakh SSR, Soviet Union
- Died: 10 February 2010 (aged 67) Saint Petersburg, Russia
- Height: 5 ft 8.5 in (174.0 cm)
- Weight: 165 lb (75 kg)

Sport
- Country: Soviet Union
- Sport: Fencing
- Event: Sabre
- Club: VS Leningrad, St. Petersburg
Medal record
Men's fencing
Representing Soviet Union
Olympic Games
Gold medal – first place	1968 Mexico City	Team sabre
Gold medal – first place	1976 Montreal	Team sabre
Silver medal – second place	1972 Munich	Team sabre

Eduard Teodorovich Vinokurov (Russian: Эдуард Теодорович Винокуров; 30 October 1942 – 10 February 2010) was a Soviet Russian Olympic champion and world champion sabre fencer.

== Early and personal life ==
Vinokurov was born in the village of Baizhansai, South Kazakhstan Province, Kazakh SSR, and was Jewish. He attended and graduated from the Higher School of Trainers at the Leningrad Institute of Physical Culture in 1966.

== Fencing career ==
Vinokurov began fencing in 1956. He trained at the Armed Forces sports society in Leningrad.

He was the USSR sabre champion in 1966, and won three silver medals (1969, 1972, and 1973) and three bronze medals (1968, 1970, 1976). Vinokurov also won the Soviet Cup three times (1965, 1967, and 1972). Vinokurov won the European Cup in the team event five consecutive years, from 1967 to 1971.

Vinokurov was named an Honoured Master of Sports of the USSR in 1968. After his competitive career, Vinokurov worked as a fencing coach in St. Petersburg and became an international fencing referee.

=== World Championships ===
A member of the USSR National sabre team since 1966, Vinokurov won the gold medal in the team competition at the World Fencing Championships in 1967, 1969, 1970, 1971, 1974, and 1975, and also won silver medals at the World Championships in 1966 and 1973.

=== Olympic career ===
Vinokurov represented the Soviet Union in the team sabre event at the 1968, 1972, and 1976 Summer Olympics, winning 3 medals (gold medals in 1968 and 1976, and silver in 1972).

== Hall of Fame ==
Vinokurov was inducted in 2007 into the International Jewish Sports Hall of Fame.

== See also ==
- List of select Jewish fencers
- List of Jewish Olympic medalists
