= William T. Passmore =

American lacrosse player

Medal record

Men's lacrosse

Representing United States

Olympic Games
Silver medal – second place	1904 St Louis	Team competition

William Thomas Passmore (September 6, 1882 – May 9, 1955) was an American lacrosse player who competed in the 1904 Summer Olympics. He was born and died in St. Louis, Missouri. In 1904, he was member of the St. Louis Amateur Athletic Association which won the silver medal in the lacrosse tournament. His younger brother, George, was also in the team.
