= Snake Eater (identification system) =

Snake Eater is a military identification system and database developed by Computer Deductions, Inc. for the United States Army. The system allows military personnel to track and identify terrorists and insurgents in much the same way that mobile data terminals are used by police officers for criminals.

Development began in late 2006 after being suggested by Major Owen West, a Marine Corps officer serving in the Anbar Province of Iraq. Snake Eater gives military personnel access to a database including names, addresses, known associates, and other pieces of information. This information, previously collected in homemade spreadsheets or on pieces of paper, can now be accessed and expanded through hand-held devices.

Funding for the project was originally provided by the Spirit of America project, a civilian organization that advocates support of U.S. troops abroad. Spirit of America provided $30,000 for the development of a prototype model, with Goldman Sachs contributing another $14,000. The system uses technology previously released by Cross Match Technologies and Knowledge Computing Corporation of Arizona.
