= George Passmore (lacrosse) =

American lacrosse player

Medal record

Men's lacrosse

Representing United States

Olympic Games
Silver medal – second place	1904 St Louis	Team competition

George William Passmore (August 24, 1889 – September 22, 1952) was an American lacrosse player who competed in the 1904 Summer Olympics. He was born in St. Louis, Missouri and died in Florissant, Missouri.

In 1904 he became a member of the St. Louis Amateur Athletic Association which won the silver medal in the lacrosse tournament. His older brother William was also on the team.
