= Black Hawk (lacrosse) =

First Nations lacrosse player

Personal information
- Nickname: Joe Crawford
- Born: 23 May 1877 Ontario, Canada

Sport
- Country: Canada
- Sport: Lacrosse
Medal record
Men's lacrosse
Representing Canada
Bronze medal – third place	1904 St Louis	Team competition

Black Hawk (born 23 May 1877, date of death unknown), also known by his Anglicised name of Joe Crawford, was a First Nations lacrosse player. He was the goaltender of the Mohawk Indians Lacrosse Team that competed on behalf of Canada at the 1904 Summer Olympics.

At the games, they first competed against the St. Louis Amateur Athletic Association and tied with a score of two to two. Although they tied, the Mowhawk Indians did not advance further, instead winning a bronze. Not much is known about Hawk's life though he was arrested during the St. Louis World's Fair for public intoxication.

== Biography ==
Black Hawk, who had an Anglicised name of Joe Crawford, was born on 23 May 1877 in Ontario, Canada. He was a member of the Cayuga people. He was the goaltender for the Mohawk Indians Lacrosse Team. The team was sometimes listed as the Iroquois Indians team as the Mohawk people were one of the six nations of the Six Nation Confederacy. The members of the team came from areas surrounding the city of Brantford, including Hawk.

The team was invited to compete in lacrosse at the 1904 Summer Olympics in St. Louis. At their first match on 2 July against the St. Louis Amateur Athletic Association, they had tied with a score of two to two. The Mohawk Indians did not advance further. Although not advancing further, they had won the bronze medal on the behalf of Canada at the Summer Games.

After their event, they competed against the Calumet Lacrosse Club on 3 July 1904. They had lost four to two. Not much is known about Hawk's life, though he was reported to have been arrested during the St. Louis World's Fair for public intoxication.
