= Jack Sullivan (lacrosse) =

Canadian lacrosse player

Medal record

Men's lacrosse

Representing United States

Olympic Games
Silver medal – second place	1904 St Louis	Team competition

John Sullivan (August 29, 1870 – Unknown death) was a Canadian lacrosse player who competed in the 1904 Summer Olympics for the United States. Sullivan was born in Cobourg, Ontario. In 1904 he was member of the St. Louis Amateur Athletic Association which won the silver medal in the lacrosse tournament.
