= William Partridge (lacrosse) =

American lacrosse player

Medal record

Men's lacrosse

Representing United States

Olympic Games
Silver medal – second place	1904 St Louis	Team competition

William Partridge was an American lacrosse player who competed in the 1904 Summer Olympics. In 1904 he was member of the St. Louis Amateur Athletic Association which won the silver medal in the lacrosse tournament.
