= Albert Venn =

American lacrosse player

Personal information
- Born: September 24, 1867
- Died: August 2, 1908 (aged 40)

Sport
Medal record
Men's lacrosse
Representing United States
Olympic Games
Silver medal – second place	1904 St Louis	Team competition

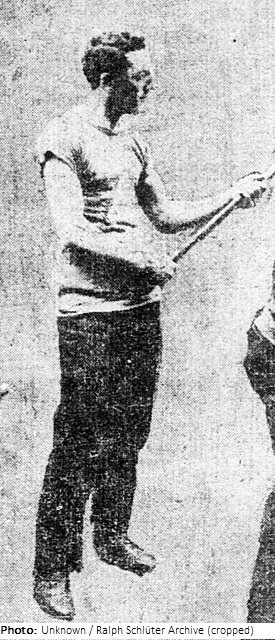
Albert Venn in 1904

Albert H. Venn (September 24, 1867 – August 2, 1908) was an American lacrosse player who competed in the 1904 Summer Olympics. In 1904 he was a member of the St. Louis Amateur Athletic Association which won the silver medal in the lacrosse tournament. They lost in the final to the Winnipeg Shamrocks.

A native of Detroit, Michigan, Venn lived in St. Louis and was an inspector of roads and sidewalks for a short while before joining the lacrosse team.

Venn committed suicide by hanging in 1908.
