= William Murphy (lacrosse) =

American lacrosse player

Medal record

Men's lacrosse

Representing United States

Olympic Games
Silver medal – second place	1904 St Louis	Team competition

William Arthur Murphy (May 23, 1867 – April 17, 1957) was an American lacrosse player who competed in the 1904 Summer Olympics. He was a member of the St. Louis Amateur Athletic Association, which won the silver medal in the lacrosse tournament.
