= Red Jacket (lacrosse) =

Canadian lacrosse player

Personal information
- Nickname: William Alexander Turkey
- Born: April 15, 1879 Six Nations Reserve, Brantford, Ontario

Sport
- Country: Canada
- Sport: Lacrosse
Medal record
Men's lacrosse Competitor for Canada
Bronze medal – third place	1904 St Louis	Team competition

Red Jacket (born 15 April 1879, date of death unknown) was a Canadian lacrosse player who competed in the 1904 Summer Olympics. In 1904 he was member of the Mohawk Indians Lacrosse Team which won the bronze medal in the lacrosse tournament.
