= George Cloutier =

Canadian lacrosse player

Olympic medal record

Men's lacrosse Competitor for Canada
Gold medal – first place	1904 St Louis	Team competition

George Cloutier (July 16, 1876 - April 20, 1946) was a Canadian lacrosse player who competed in the 1904 Summer Olympics.

In 1904 he was member of the Shamrock Lacrosse Team which won the gold medal in the lacrosse tournament.
