= Spotted Tail (lacrosse) =

First Nations lacrosse player

Olympic medal record

Men's lacrosse Competitor for Canada
Bronze medal – third place	1904 St Louis	Team competition

Spotted Tail (born 1883, date of death unknown) was a First Nations lacrosse player who competed in the 1904 Summer Olympics for Canada. In 1904, he was member of the Mohawk Indians Lacrosse Team which won the bronze medal in the lacrosse tournament.
