= Élie Blanchard =

Canadian lacrosse player

Joseph Élie Blanchard
- Born: August 3, 1881; Montreal, Quebec, Canada
- Died: December 12, 1941 (aged 60); Montreal, Quebec, Canada
- Occupations: Civil engineer, Olympic athlete
- Known for: Winning the gold medal as part of the Canadian Shamrocks team in the 1904 Olympics.

Olympic medal record

Men's lacrosse Competitor for Canada
Gold medal – first place	1904 St Louis	Team competition

Joseph Élie Blanchard (August 3, 1881 – December 12, 1941) was a Canadian lacrosse player who competed in the 1904 Summer Olympics. Born in Montreal in 1881, he graduated as an engineer at the École Polytechnique de Montréal in 1902 before working for the city of Winnipeg in 1904. The same year, he was briefly a member of the Shamrock Lacrosse Team which won the gold medal in the lacrosse tournament on July 7, 1904, against the St.-Louis Amateur Athletic Association's team. Following the Olympics, in 1905, Blanchard became the chief engineer for the city of Saint Henri. Following the city's annexion by neighboring Montreal, he continued working as an engineer for the enlarged city. His work included the sewer division and the road divisions of the city starting in 1915 before becoming superintendent of the roads department in 1918 and chief engineer and director of public works in 1935. In 2004, 62 years after his death, Joseph Élie Blanchard was inducted along his lacrosse 1904 teammates in the Manitoba Sports Hall of Fame.
