= William Brennaugh =

Canadian lacrosse player

Olympic medal record

Men's lacrosse Competitor for Canada
Gold medal – first place	1904 St Louis	Team competition

William Thomas Edmund Brennaugh (August 13, 1877 - October 23, 1934) was a Canadian lacrosse player who competed in the 1904 Summer Olympics. In 1904 he was member of the Shamrock Lacrosse Team which won the gold medal in the lacrosse tournament.
