= Lightfoot (lacrosse) =

Canadian lacrosse player

Olympic medal record

Men's lacrosse Competitor for Canada
| Bronze medal – third place | 1904 St Louis | Team competition |

Lightfoot was a First Nations lacrosse player who competed in the 1904 Summer Olympics for Canada. In 1904 he was member of the Mohawk Indians Lacrosse Team which won the bronze medal in the lacrosse tournament.
