= Benjamin Jamieson =

Canadian lacrosse player

Olympic medal record

Men's lacrosse Competitor for Canada
Gold medal – first place	1904 St Louis	Team competition

Benjamin Jamieson (March 15, 1874 - December 3, 1915) was a Canadian lacrosse player who competed in the 1904 Summer Olympics. In 1904, he was a member of the Shamrock Lacrosse Team which won the gold medal in the lacrosse tournament.
