= George Cattanach =

Canadian lacrosse player

Olympic medal record

Men's lacrosse Competitor for Canada
Gold medal – first place	1904 St Louis	Team competition

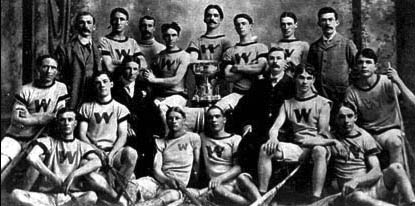

George James Cattanach (July 25, 1878 – January 29, 1954) was a Canadian lacrosse player who competed in the 1904 Summer Olympics. Cattanach was born in Alexandria, Ontario. In 1904 he was member of the Shamrock Lacrosse Team which won the gold medal in the lacrosse tournament. He died in East Chicago, Indiana.
