= Stuart Laidlaw =

Canadian lacrosse player

Olympic medal record

Men's lacrosse

Representing Canada
Gold medal – first place	1904 St Louis	Team competition

Stuart Laidlaw (March 2, 1877 – November 22, 1960) was a Canadian lacrosse player who competed in the 1904 Summer Olympics. He was born in Ontario and died in Vancouver. In 1904 he was member of the Shamrock Lacrosse Team which won the gold medal in the lacrosse tournament.
