= Night Hawk (lacrosse) =

Canadian lacrosse player

Olympic medal record

Men's lacrosse Competitor for Canada
Bronze medal – third place	1904 St Louis	Team competition

Night Hawk was a Canadian lacrosse player who competed in the 1904 Summer Olympics. In 1904 he was member of the Mohawk Indians Lacrosse Team which won the bronze medal in the lacrosse tournament.
