= Man Afraid of the Soap =

Canadian lacrosse player

Personal information
- Born: Freeman Joseph Isaacs; October 2, 1869 Ohsweken, Ontario
- Died: June 19, 1937 (aged 67) Six Nations Reserve, Brantford, Ontario
- Relative: Bill Isaacs (son)

Sport
- Country: Canada
- Sport: Lacrosse
Medal record
Men's lacrosse Competitor for Canada
Bronze medal – third place	1904 St Louis	Team competition

Freeman Joseph Isaacs, professionally known as Man Afraid of the Soap (2 October 1869 – 19 June 1937), was a Canadian lacrosse player who competed in the 1904 Summer Olympics. In 1904, he was a member of the Mohawk Indians lacrosse team which won the bronze medal in the lacrosse tournament.

He was the father of Bill Isaacs, Canadian Lacrosse Hall of Fame inductee.
