= Almighty Voice (lacrosse) =

Canadian lacrosse player

Personal information
- Nickname: Jacob Martin Jamieson
- Born: February 19, 1873 Cattaraugus Reservation, New York, U.S.
- Died: August 15, 1960 (aged 87) Coldspring, New York, U.S.

Sport
- Country: Canada
- Sport: Lacrosse
Medal record
Men's lacrosse Competitor for Canada
Bronze medal – third place	1904 St Louis	Team competition

Almighty Voice, also known as Jacob Jamieson or Jimerson (February 19, 1873 – August 15, 1960), was a Canadian lacrosse player who competed in the 1904 Summer Olympics. In 1904 he was member of the Mohawk Indians Lacrosse Team which won the bronze medal in the lacrosse tournament.
