= Rain in Face =

Canadian lacrosse player

Personal information
- Nickname: Robert Lottridge
- Born: February 10, 1885
- Died: September 1968 (aged 83)

Sport
- Country: Canada
- Sport: Lacrosse
Medal record
Men's lacrosse Competitor for Canada
Bronze medal – third place	1904 St. Louis	Team competition

Rain in Face (10 February 1885 – September 1968) was a Canadian lacrosse player who competed in the 1904 Summer Olympics. In 1904 he was member of the Mohawk Indians Lacrosse Team, which won the bronze medal in the lacrosse tournament.
