= Albert Lehman =

American lacrosse player

Medal record

Men's lacrosse

Representing United States

Olympic Games
Silver medal – second place	1904 St Louis	Team competition

Albert Lehman was an American lacrosse player.

He was Jewish. He played for the St. Louis Amateur Athletic Association. He won a silver medal in lacrosse at the 1904 Summer Olympics in St. Louis.
