= Hilliard Lyle =

Canadian lacrosse player

Olympic medal record

Men's lacrosse

Representing Canada
Gold medal – first place	1904 St Louis	Team competition

Hilliard Lyle (December 21, 1879 – May 21, 1931) was a Canadian lacrosse player who competed in the 1904 Summer Olympics. Lyle was born in Arran-Elderslie, Ontario. In 1904 he was member of the Shamrock Lacrosse Team which won the gold medal in the lacrosse tournament.

Lyle served in the Canadian Army during the Second Boer War and World War I. During the Irish War of Independence, he served in the Auxiliary Division. After the war, he returned to Canada. Lyle murdered his wife in Beaverlodge, Alberta before killing himself in 1931.
