= Black Eagle (lacrosse) =

First Nations lacrosse player

Personal information
- Nickname: Bill Austin
- Born: July 1865 Ontario, Canada
- Died: Unknown

Sport
- Country: Canada
- Sport: Lacrosse
Medal record
Men's lacrosse Competitor for Canada
Bronze medal – third place	1904 St Louis	Team competition

Black Eagle (born July 1865, date of death unknown) was a First Nations lacrosse player who competed in the 1904 Summer Olympics for Canada. In 1904, he was a member of the Mohawk Indians Lacrosse Team which won the bronze medal in the lacrosse tournament.
