= Lawrence Pentland =

Canadian lacrosse player

Personal information
- Born: April 6, 1879 Manitoba
- Died: November 2, 1923 (aged 44) Winnipeg, Manitoba, Canada
Medal record
Men's lacrosse
Representing Canada
Gold medal – first place	1904 St Louis	Team competition

Lawrence Henry Pentland (April 6, 1879 – November 2, 1923) was a Canadian lacrosse player who competed in the 1904 Summer Olympics. He was born in Manitoba and died in Winnipeg. In 1904 he was member of the Shamrock Lacrosse Team which won the gold medal in the lacrosse tournament.
