= Sandy Cowan =

Canadian lacrosse player

Olympic medal record

Men's lacrosse Competitor for Canada
Gold medal – first place	1904 St Louis	Team competition

Alexander Cowan (February 5, 1879 – January 8, 1915) was a Canadian lacrosse player who competed in the 1904 Summer Olympics. In 1904 he was member of the Shamrock Lacrosse Team which won the gold medal in the lacrosse tournament.
