= Half Moon (lacrosse) =

First Nations lacrosse player

Personal information
- Nickname: Amos Obediah
- Born: April 30, 1872 Ontario, Canada
- Died: August 29, 1948 (aged 76) Ontario, Canada

Sport
- Country: Canada
- Sport: Lacrosse
Medal record
Men's lacrosse Competitor for Canada
Bronze medal – third place	1904 St Louis	Team competition

Half Moon (30 April 1872 – 29 August 1948) was a First Nations lacrosse player who competed in the 1904 Summer Olympics for Canada. In 1904 he was member of the Mohawk Indians Lacrosse Team which won the bronze medal in the lacrosse tournament.
