= Lacrosse at the 1904 Summer Olympics =

Men's lacrosse at the Games of the III Olympiad
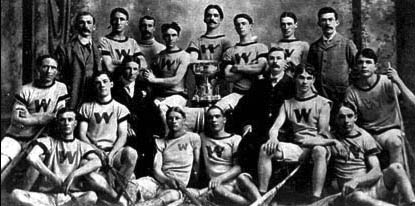
- 1904 Olympics champions Shamrock Lacrosse Team
- Venue: Francis Field
- Dates: July 5–7
- Competitors: 39 from 2 nations

Medalists
1st place, gold medalist(s)		Shamrock Lacrosse Team; Canada
2nd place, silver medalist(s)		St. Louis Amateur Athletic Association; United States
3rd place, bronze medalist(s)		Mohawk Indians; Canada

The sport of field lacrosse was played at the 1904 Summer Olympics, which marked the first time that lacrosse had been featured at the Olympic Games. Three teams participated — two from Canada and one from the United States. One of the Canadian teams consisted entirely of Mohawk nation players. The victorious Shamrock Lacrosse Team is more commonly known as the Winnipeg Shamrocks.

A second American team, the Brooklyn Crescents, was entered but did not participate: they were scheduled to play a semi-final against the Shamrocks, but arrived too late and were disqualified.

== Medal table ==
Position	Country	Gold	Silver	Bronze	Total
1	Canada	1	0	1	2
2	United States	0	1	0	1

== Medal summary ==
Gold	Silver	Bronze
Canada; Shamrock Lacrosse Team: Élie Blanchard; William Brennaugh; George Bretz; William Burns; George Cattanach; George Cloutier; Sandy Cowan; Jack Flett; Benjamin Jamieson; Stuart Laidlaw; Hilliard Lyle; William F. L. Orris; Lawrence Pentland	United States; St. Louis Amateur Athletic Association: J. W. Dowling; W. R. Gibson; Hugh Grogan; Philip Hess; Tom Hunter; Albert Lehman; William Murphy; William Partridge; George Passmore; William T. Passmore; W. J. Ross; Jack Sullivan; Albert Venn; A. M. Woods	Canada; Mohawk Indians: Black Hawk; Black Eagle; Almighty Voice; Flat Iron; Spotted Tail; Half Moon; Lightfoot; Snake Eater; Red Jacket; Night Hawk; Man Afraid of the Soap; Rain in Face

== Results ==
Semifinal
Canada; Shamrock Lacrosse Team	w/o (Note: Brooklyn Crescents were disqualified after arriving too late for the match.)
United States; Brooklyn Crescents
United States; St. Louis Amateur Athletic Association	2 (Note: St. Louis advanced after a drawing of lots.)
Canada; Mohawk Indians	2

Final
Canada; Shamrock Lacrosse Team	8
United States; St. Louis Amateur Athletic Association	2

== Rosters ==
=== Shamrock Lacrosse Team ===
- Élie Blanchard
- William Brennaugh
- George Bretz
- William Burns
- George Cattanach
- George Cloutier
- Sandy Cowan
- Jack Flett
- Benjamin Jamieson
- Stuart Laidlaw
- Hilliard Lyle
- William F. L. Orris
- Lawrence Pentland

=== St. Louis Amateur Athletic Association ===
- J. W. Dowling
- W. R. Gibson
- Hugh Grogan
- Philip Hess
- Tom Hunter
- Albert Lehman
- William Murphy
- William Partridge
- George Passmore
- William T. Passmore
- W. J. Ross
- Jack Sullivan
- Albert Venn
- A. M. Woods

=== Mohawk Indians ===
- Black Hawk
- Black Eagle
- Almighty Voice
- Flat Iron
- Spotted Tail
- Half Moon
- Lightfoot
- Snake Eater
- Red Jacket
- Night Hawk
- Man Afraid of the Soap
- Rain in Face

"Man Afraid of Soap" was also known by the English alternative name Freeman Joseph Isaacs; he is the father of Canadian Lacrosse Hall of Fame inductee, Bill Isaacs. The English alternative names of the remaining players were Joe Crawford, Philip Jackson, Eli Warner, Amos Obediah, Thomas Will, Berman L. Snow, L. Bumbary, J. B. Eaver, Eli Martin, Sandy Turkey, Austin Bill, W. E. Martin, Jacob Jamieson, Eli Henry, Joe Clark, Frank Seneca, Charlie Johnon and Robert Lottridge.

== See also ==
- World Lacrosse
- World Lacrosse Championship
