= George Bretz =

Canadian lacrosse player

Personal information
- Born: September 3, 1880 Blenheim, Ontario, Canada
- Died: May 7, 1956 (aged 75) Toronto, Ontario, Canada

Sport
- Sport: Lacrosse
Medal record
Men's lacrosse Competitor for Canada
Gold medal – first place	1904 St Louis	Team competition

George Henry Bretz, later Brett, (September 3, 1880 – May 7, 1956) was a Canadian lacrosse player who competed in the 1904 Summer Olympics. In 1904 he was member of the Shamrock Lacrosse Team which won the gold medal in the lacrosse tournament.
