= Snake Eater (lacrosse) =

First Nations lacrosse player

Olympic medal record

Men's lacrosse Competitor for Canada
Bronze medal – third place	1904 St Louis	Team competition

Snake Eater was a First Nations lacrosse player who competed in the 1904 Summer Olympics for Canada. In 1904 he was a member of the Mohawk Indians Lacrosse Team which won the bronze medal in the lacrosse tournament.
