= Jack Flett =

Canadian lacrosse player

Olympic medal record

Men's lacrosse

Representing Canada
Gold medal – first place	1904 St Louis	Team competition

John Flett (November 19, 1871 – December 13, 1932) was a Canadian lacrosse player who competed in the 1904 Summer Olympics. He was born in Kildonan, Manitoba and died in West Vancouver, British Columbia. In 1904 he was member of the Shamrock Lacrosse Team which won the gold medal in the lacrosse tournament.
