= Abdul Hamid =

ʻAbd al-Ḥamīd (ALA-LC romanization of Arabic: عبد الحميد; Persian: عبدالحمید, romanized: Abdolhamid; Turkish: Abdülhamit), also spelled as Abdulhamid, Abdelhamid, Abd-ul Hamid, and Abd ol-Hamid, is a Muslim male given name and, in modern usage, surname. It is a Muslim theophoric name built from the Arabic words ʻabd ('servant') and al-Ḥamīd (one of the names of God in the Qur'an), and thus means 'servant of the All-laudable'.

It may refer to:

== Given name ==
- Abd al-Hamid al-Katib (died 749), Umayyad official and Islamic scholar
- 'Abd al-Hamīd ibn Turk (fl. 830), Turkish Muslim mathematician
- Abdul Hamid Lahori (died 1654), Indian traveller and court historian of Shah Jahan
- Abdul Hamid Baba (died c.1732), Pashtun poet
- Abdul Hamid I (1725–1789), sultan of the Ottoman Empire
- Abdul Hamid (surveyor) (died ?1864), surveyor in Central Asia
- Abdul Hamid II (1842–1918), sultan of the Ottoman Empire
- Abdul Hamid Halim of Kedah (1864–1943), Sultan of Kedah
- Abdul Hamid Madarshahi (1869–1920), Bengali Islamic scholar and author
- Maulana Abdul Hamid Khan Bhashani (1880–1976), political leader in Pakistan and Bangladesh
- Abdulhamid Bey Gaytabashi (1884–1920), Chief of General Staff of Azerbaijani Armed Forces
- Abdul Hamid (politician, born 1886) (1886–1963), former Education Minister of Assam
- Abdelhamid Ben Badis (1889–1940), Algerian Muslim scholar
- Abdul Hamid Karami (1890–1950), Lebanese politician
- Khwaja Abdul Hamied (1898–1972), Indian chemist and businessman
- ‘Abdu’l-Hamíd Ishráq-Khávari (1902–1972), Iranian Bahá'í scholar
- Sufi Abdul Hamid (1903–1938), African-American religious and labor leader
- Abdelhamid Abdou (1905–1972), Egyptian footballer
- Syarif Abdul Hamid Alkadrie (1913–1978), Sultan of Pontianak, Indonesia
- Abdul Hamid Khan (general) (1917–1984), Pakistani soldier
- Abdelhamid I. Sabra (1924–2013), known as A. I. Sabra, Egyptian-American historian of science
- Abdel Hamid al-Sarraj (1925–2013), Syrian soldier and politician
- Fouad Abdulhameed Alkhateeb (1925–1995), Saudi Arabian diplomat and businessman
- Abdelhamid Mehri (1926–2012), Algerian politician
- Abdelhamid Bouchouk (1927–2004), Algerian footballer
- Abdul Hamid (field hockey) (1927–2019), Gold medallist for Pakistan in 1960 Olympics
- Abdul Hameed (writer) (1928–2011), Pakistani Urdu writer
- Abdul Hamid Omar (1929–2009), Malaysian judge
- Abdelhamid Kermali (1931–2013), Algerian footballer and football manager
- Abdul Hamid (soldier) (1933–1965), Indian soldier and recipient of the Param Vir Chakra
- Abd al-Hamid Kishk (1933–1996), Egyptian preacher, scholar of Islam and author
- Abdul Hamid al-Bakkoush (1933–2007), Libyan politician
- Omar Abdul Hamid Karami (1934–2015), known as Omar Karami, Lebanese politician
- Abdelhamid Brahimi (1936–2021), Prime Minister of Algeria
- Mohsen Abdel Hamid (born 1937), Iraqi politician
- Abdelhamid Temmar (born 1938), Algerian politician
- Abdelhamid Sharaf (1939–1980), Prime Minister of Jordan
- Abdelhamid Slama (1941–2025), Tunisian politician
- Abdul Hamid II (field hockey) (born 1942), Silver medallist for Pakistan in 1964 Olympics
- Abdul Hameed Dogar (born 1944), Pakistani judge
- Abdul Hamid Pawanteh (1944–2022), Malaysian politician
- Abdul Hameed Nayyar (born 1945), Pakistani physicist
- Molavi Abdul Hamid (born ca. 1946/1947), Iranian cleric
- Abdolhamid Fathi (born 1948), Iranian fencer
- Abdul Hamid (voice actor) (1948–2022), Indonesian voice actor and puppeteer
- Abdul Hamid (Indian politician) (born 1950), Indian politician
- Wagdy Abd el-Hamied Mohamed Ghoneim (born c. 1952), Egyptian Islamic preacher and writer
- Abdul Hamid Khan (politician) (born 1953), Pakistani politician
- Abdellatif Abdelhamid (born 1954), Syrian film director
- Gamal Abdelhamid (born 1957), Egyptian footballer (Zamalek)
- Abid Al-Hamid Mahmud al-Tikriti, or Abid Hamid Mahmud (1957–2012), Iraqi military officer
- Abdelhamid Halim Ben-Mabrouk (born 1960), known as Halim Benmabrouk, French-Algerian footballer
- Mohamed Fouad Abd El Hamid Hassan (born 1961), known as Mohammad Fouad, Egyptian singer
- Abdel Hamid al-Ghazzawi (born 1962), Libyan Guantanamo detainee
- Abdullah Sani Abdul Hamid (born 1962), Malaysian politician
- Ammar Abdulhamid (born 1966), Syrian political activist
- Abdul Hamid al-Awak (born 1966), Syrian politician, jurist, and academic
- Yushau Abdulhameed Shuaib or Yushau Shuaib (born 1969), Nigerian writer
- Abdul Hamid Bassiouny (born 1971), Egyptian footballer (Haras el Hodood)
- Wazi Abdul Hamid (born 1971), Malaysian motorcyclist
- Abdelhamid Hassan (born 1972), Egyptian footballer
- Tamer Abdel Hamid (born 1975), Egyptian footballer (Zamalek)
- Abdolhamid Rigi (ca. 1979–2010), Iranian executed for terrorist offences
- Amir Abdelhamid (born 1979), Egyptian footballer (El-Ahly)
- Ahmed Hossam Hussein Abdelhamid (born 1983), known as Mido, Egyptian footballer
- Abdel Hamid Ahmed (born 1984), Egyptian footballer (El-Ahly)
- Abdelhameed Amarri (born 1984), Sudanese footballer
- Abdul Hameid Shabana (born 1985), Egyptian footballer
- Abdul Hadi Abdul Hamid (born 1987), Malaysian footballer
- Abdelhamid Abaaoud (1987–2015), terrorist involved in the November 2015 Paris attacks
- Abdülhamit Yıldız (born 1987), Turkish footballer
- Mustafa Abdul-Hamid (born 1988), American basketball player
- Abdelhamid Abuhabib (born 1989), Palestinian Footballer
- Abdelhamid El Kaoutari (born 1990), French footballer of Moroccan descent
- Abdul Hamid (born 1990), known as Bill Hamid, American soccer player
- Abdulrahim Abdulhameed (born 1990), Bahraini Taekwondo practitioner
- Mohd Zabri Abdul Hamid (1937–1975), Malaysian policeman
- Diwan Bhai Abdul Hamid, Chief Minister of Kapurthala Princely State in India under the British Raj
- Abdul Hamid Ali Hassan, Bahraini diplomat
- Abdol-Hamid Heyrat Sajjadi, Iranian writer
- Abdul Hamid Adiamoh, Nigerian journalist
- Ja'far 'Abd Al-Hamid, Iraqi-British film-maker
- Abdul Hamid (Pakistani politician), Pakistani politician
- Abdul Hameed (Pakistani politician), Pakistani politician
- Abdul Hamid Khorasani, Afghan military commander
- Muhammad Abdul Hamid (disambiguation), multiple people

== Family or father name ==
- Dina bint 'Abdu'l-Hamid (1929–2019), Egyptian, first wife of King Hussein of Jordan
- Ammar Abdulhamid (born 1966), Syrian writer
- Asmaa Abdol-Hamid (born 1981), Danish social worker and politician
- Marwan Abdelhamid (born 2000), known as Saint Levant, Palestinian singer-songwriter and rapper
- Rana Abdelhamid (born 1993), Egyptian-American self-defense advocate
- Sara Abdel-Hamid (born 1989), known as Ikonika, British electronic musician, producer and DJ
- Yunis Abdelhamid (born 1987), French footballer

== See also ==
- Kolej Sultan Abdul Hamid, school in Malaysia
- Abdul Hamid Sharaf School, school in Jordan
- Masjid Abdul Hamid, mosque in Singapore
- Ottoman submarine Abdül Hamid, constructed 1886
- Abdul the Damned, also known as Abdul Hamid, 1935 British film
- Abdul Hamid Khan (disambiguation)
