= Armenophile =

Person with a strong interest in Armenians

An Armenophile (Armenian: հայասեր, hayaser, lit. "Armenian-lover") is a non-Armenian person who expresses a strong interest in or appreciation for Armenian culture, Armenian history or the Armenian people. It may apply to both those who display an enthusiasm in Armenian culture and to those who support political or social causes associated with the Armenian people. During and after the First World War and simultaneous Armenian genocide, the term was applied to people like Henry Morgenthau who actively drew attention to the victims of massacre and deportation, and who raised aid for refugees. President Woodrow Wilson and Theodore Roosevelt have also been called Armenophiles, due in part to their support for the creation of Wilsonian Armenia.

== Notable Armenophiles ==
=== Georgia ===
According to the 12th century Armenian historian Matthew of Edessa, the Georgian King David the Builder (r. 1089–1125) "received and loved the Armenian people." Armenian lords found warm welcome in his kingdom.

=== Britain ===
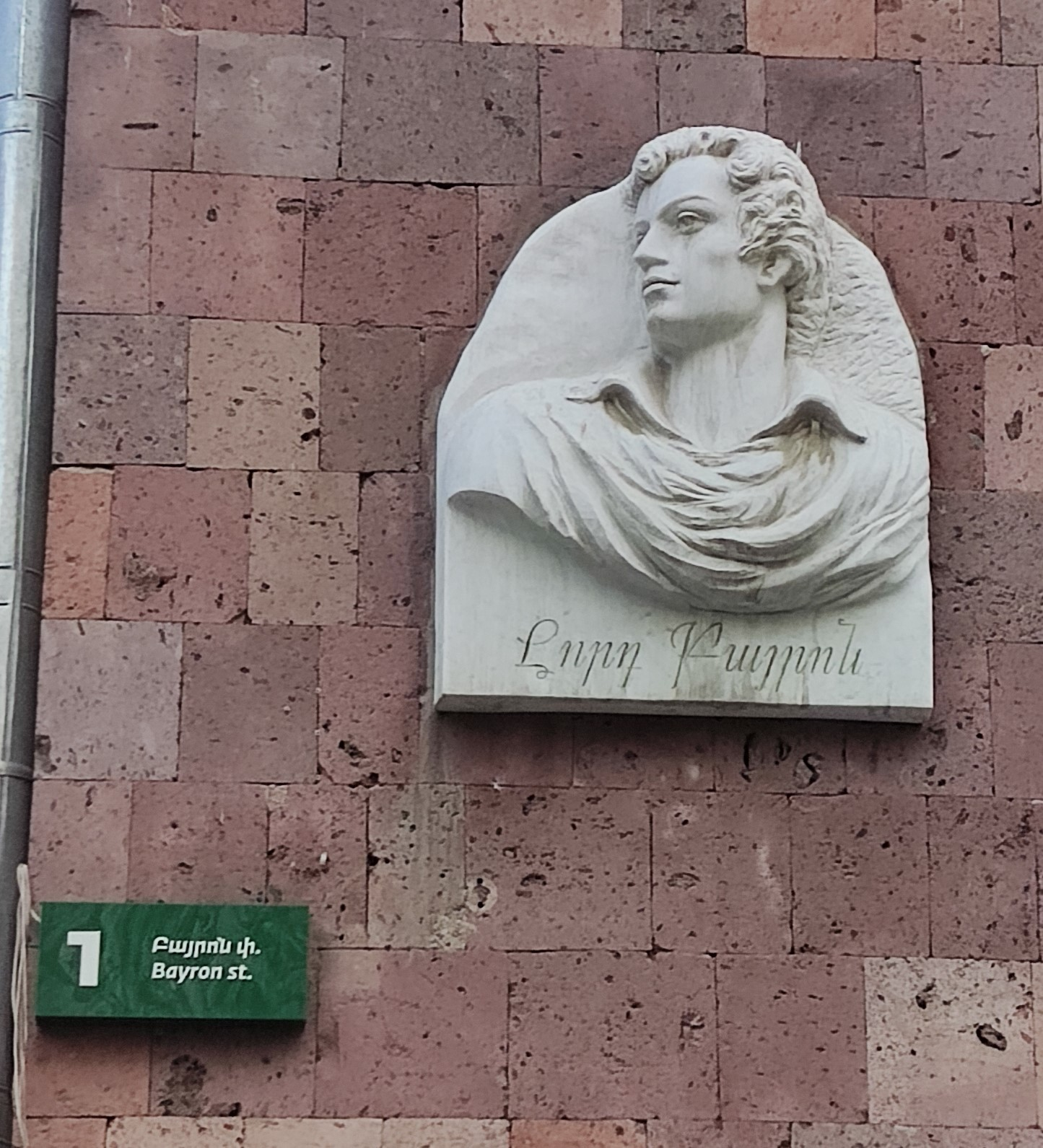
Lord Byron Street and plaque in Yerevan.

English Romantic poet Lord Byron (1788–1824) showed appreciation of the Armenian people, and has been described as being an "early enthusiast who spoke for the Armenians." Byron lived in San Lazzaro degli Armeni, a small island in Venice home to an important Armenian Catholic monastery, from late 1816 to early 1817. He acquired enough Armenian to translate passages from Classical Armenian into English. He co-authored English Grammar and Armenian (published in 1817) and Armenian Grammar and English (published in 1819), where he included quotations from classical and modern Armenian. Byron is considered the most prominent of all visitors of the island. The room where Byron studied now bears his name and is cherished by the monks.

British academic, jurist, historian and Liberal politician James Bryce (1838–1922) visited Armenian lands twice (in 1876 and 1880). In 1876 he climbed Mount Ararat, Armenia's national symbol. During the Hamidian massacres and the Armenian genocide he was the leading Armenophile in Britain. His October 6, 1915 speech at the parliament about the genocide was included in Arnold J. Toynbee's book Armenian Atrocities: the Murder of a Nation. Toynbee's edited Bryce's documents (mostly testimonies of eyewitnesses) about the genocide, titled The Treatment of Armenians in the Ottoman Empire, 1915–1916. He wrote an article titled "The Future of Armenia" in The Contemporary Review in 1918.

British Liberal Prime Minister William Ewart Gladstone (1809–1898), stated in a speech in 1895, during the Hamidian massacres, that "To serve Armenia is to serve civilization."

=== Elsewhere ===
Protestant missionary Johannes Lepsius (1858–1926) is described as the "German who knew the most about the Armenians for he had been supporting their cause vehemently since the massacres of the Armenians by Sultan Abdul Hamid at the end of the 19th century."

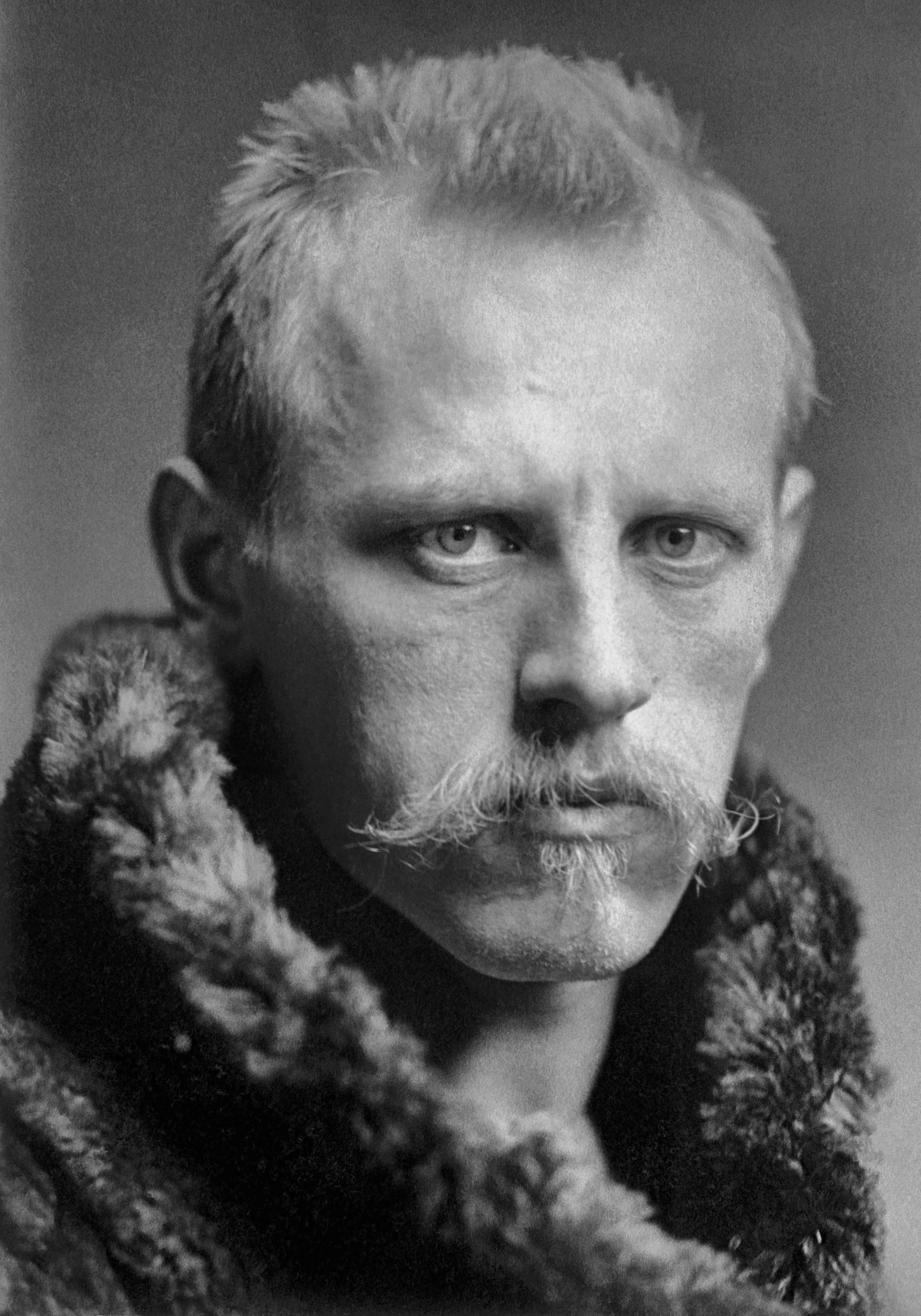
Nobel Peace Prize laureate Fridtjof Nansen supported the plight of the Armenians during the aftermath of the Armenian Genocide.

One author describes U.S. President Theodore Roosevelt (1858–1919) as "an ardent, even hawkish Armenophile."

Fridtjof Nansen (1861-1930), a Norwegian explorer, has been described as a "friend of the Armenian nation" for his work in the 1920s to help Armenian refugees, many of them being genocide survivors. Nansen supported Armenian refugees in acquiring the Nansen passport, which allowed them to travel freely to various countries. Nansen wrote the book, Armenia and the Near East in 1923 which describes his sympathies to the plight of the Armenians in the wake of losing its independence to the Soviet Union. After visiting Armenia, Nansen wrote two additional books called "Gjennem Armenia" ("Across Armenia"), published in 1927 and "Gjennem Kaukasus til Volga" ("Through Caucasus to Volga").

Illarion Vorontsov-Dashkov (1837–1916), a notable representative of the Vorontsov family, along with his spouse Elizaveta Andreevna Shuvalova have been regarded as Armenophiles - so Armenophiliac that in 1915 the Council of Ministers of Russia argued that Dashkov, as the viceroy of the Caucasus, sacrificed Russian interests for Armenian ones.

The Bulgarian Symbolist poet Peyo Yavorov wrote the poem "Armenians" in 1896, inspired by the sorrow and difficulties he saw of the Armenian refugees in Bulgaria. Because of this, in 1966, a school in Yerevan was named after him.

Osip Mandelstam (1891–1938), a Russian Jewish poet and essayist, has been described as an Armenophile.

=== Contemporary ===
In the 21st century several politicians in the West have been described as pro-Armenian, mostly for their activism for the recognition of the Armenian genocide and support for Artsakh (Nagorno-Karabakh). They include Baroness Caroline Cox (born 1937), a member of the British House of Lords, Adam Schiff (born 1960), U.S. Congressman from California and a Democrat, Valérie Boyer (born 1962), member of the National Assembly of France from the center-right Republicans.

== Recognition in Armenia ==
Prominent Armenophile figures have been recognized in Armenia in several ways: a street in Yerevan and a school in Gyumri are named after Byron; a park, a school and a statue of Nansen in Yerevan; Bryce Street in Yerevan.

== See also ==
- Europhile
- Kartvelophile
- Persophile
- Philhellenism
