= Hamid Khan =

Hamid Khan is the name of:

- Hamid Khan (Oz), a character in the HBO series Oz
- Hamid Khan (lawyer) (born 1946), Pakistani lawyer
- Hamid Khan (badminton) (born 1965), played for Singapore at the 1992 Summer Olympics
- Hamid Khan Achakzai, Pakistani politician
- Hamid Ali Khan (born 1953), Pakistani classical singer
- Hamid Ali Khan (actor) (1922–1998), stage name Ajit Khan, Indian actor
- Hamid Nawaz Khan, Pakistani general
- Hamid Raza Khan (1875–1943), Indian Islamic scholar and mystic
- Abdul Hamid Khan (disambiguation)
