= Abdul Hamid Khan =

Abdul Hamid Khan may refer to:

- Maulana Abdul Hamid Khan Bhashani (1880–1976), nicknamed Red Maulana, leader of his own faction of National Awami Party
- Abdul Hamid Khan Dasti, former Chief Minister of Punjab, Pakistan
- Abdul Hamid Khan Yusufzai (1845-1915), Bengali writer, journalist, and politician
- Abdul Hamid Khan (badminton) (born 1965), Singaporean badminton player
- Abdul Hamid Khan (general), (1917-1983), Deputy and acting Commander-in-Chief of Pakistan Army during Bangladesh Liberation War and Indo-Pakistani War of 1971
- Abdul Hamid Khan (Gilgit-Baltistan activist) (born 1964), Chairman of the Balawaristan National Front (Hameed Group) BNF-H
- Abdul Hamid Khan (Azad Kashmiri politician) (born 1907)
- Abdul Hameed Khan (mayor) (1892–1965), mayor of Chennai, India

== See also ==
- Abdul Hamid, for sultans of that name
- Hamid Khan (disambiguation)
