= Muhammad Abdul Hamid (disambiguation) =

Muhammad Abdul Hamid may refer to:

- Mohamad Abdul Hamid, Malaysian politician
- Mohammad Abdul Hamid, President of Bangladesh from 2013 to 2023
- Mohamed Abdul Hamid, Sudanese swimmer
- Muhammad Abdul Hamid, Bangladeshi economist

== See also ==
- Abdul Hamid
