= Abd al-Hamid al-Katib =

Umayyad official, Islamic scholar (8th century)

Abd al-Hamid ibn Yahya al-Katib
- Died: 132 AH (749/750 CE)

Philosophical work
- Era: Medieval era

Abd al-Hamid ibn Yahya al-Katib (Arabic: عبد الحميد بن يحيى الكاتب) was the secretary to the last Umayyad Caliph, Marwan II, and a supreme stylist of early Arabic prose.

Quote:

Cultivate the Arabic language so that you may speak correctly; develop a handsome script which will add luster to your writings; learn the poetry of the Arabs by heart; familiarize yourself with unusual ideas and expressions; read the history of the Arabs and the Persians, and remember their great deeds.

He may have been a descendant of a Persian captive at the battle of Qadesiya who became a mawlā (freedman) of the Qorashī clan of the Banu Amer b. Loʾayy. Some accounts, however, make the less likely claim that he was of this clan, hence of pure Arab descent. According to the Encyclopedia of Islam (3rd edition), Abd al-Hamid al-Katib was "a third-generation Muslim of non-Arab, probably Persian, extraction".
