= Kartvelophile =

Lover of Georgia

A Kartvelophile (Georgian: ქართველოფილი) is a person who is fond of, admires or loves Georgian culture, Georgian history, Georgian language, Georgian cuisine, Georgian people or Georgia in general or even exhibits Georgian nationalism in spite of not being an ethnic Georgian. Such love of Georgia and everything Georgian is called "Kartvelophilia". Its opposite is Kartvelophobia.

== Typical interests ==
- Georgian wine
- Georgian cuisine
- Georgian language
- Georgian literature
- Georgian scripts
- Georgian calligraphy

== Notable Kartvelophiles ==
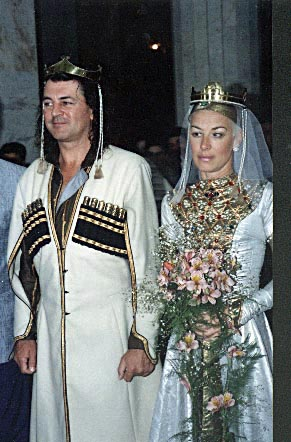
The British singer and songwriter Ian Gillan and his wife Bron, dressed in Georgian national costumes, in Tbilisi during Gillan's 1990 visit to the Soviet Union.

- Lyn Coffin
- Francis Ford Coppola
- Victoria Lopyreva
- Michael McFaul
- Simon Sebag Montefiore
- Eldar Ryazanov
- Anastasia Zavorotnyuk

== See also ==
- Russophilia
- Persophilia
