= Abdul Hamid (surveyor) =

Indian surveyor

Abdul Hamid, also known as Mohamed-i-Hameed, was an Indian surveyor from the Punjab. He was employed by Thomas George Montgomerie, as part of the Kashmir Survey project of the Survey of India, to explore and survey areas of Central Asia beyond the Indian frontier to which the British were not allowed access.

Abdul Hamid was the first of the clandestine surveyors sent by Montgomerie into Central Asia. In 1863 he was sent to survey the road to Yarkand in East ("Chinese") Turkestan (now Xinjiang Uyghur Autonomous Region, China). After reaching Yarkand, the capital of an ancient Buddhist kingdom on the southern arm of the Silk Road trading route, he lived there for six months making observations on the area. After he fell ill and died returning through the Karakoram mountains, William Johnson, another employee of the Survey, recovered his survey notes and sent them on to Montgomerie.

Montgomerie subsequently presented a paper to the Royal Geographical Society about Abdul Hamid's expedition, "On the Geographical Position of Yarkund and Other Places in Central Asia".
