= Abdelhamid Abdou =

Egyptian footballer (1905-1972)

Personal information
- Full name: Abdel Hamid Ibrahim
- Date of birth: 20 December 1905
- Place of birth: Alexandria, Egypt
- Date of death: 11 June 1972 (aged 66)
- Place of death: Alexandria, Egypt
- Position: Defender

Senior career*
| Years | Team | Apps | (Gls) |
- El-Olympi

International career
- Egypt
- * Club domestic league appearances and goals

Ibrahim Abdelhamid Abdou (20 December 1905 – 11 June 1972) was an Egyptian football defender who played for Egypt in the 1934 FIFA World Cup. He also played for El-Olympi, and was part of Egypt's squad at the 1936 Summer Olympics, but he did not play in any matches.
