= List of parks in Yerevan =

This is a list of the principal parks of Yerevan, the capital of Armenia.

== Ajapnyak District ==
- Tumanyan Park
- Buenos Aires Park
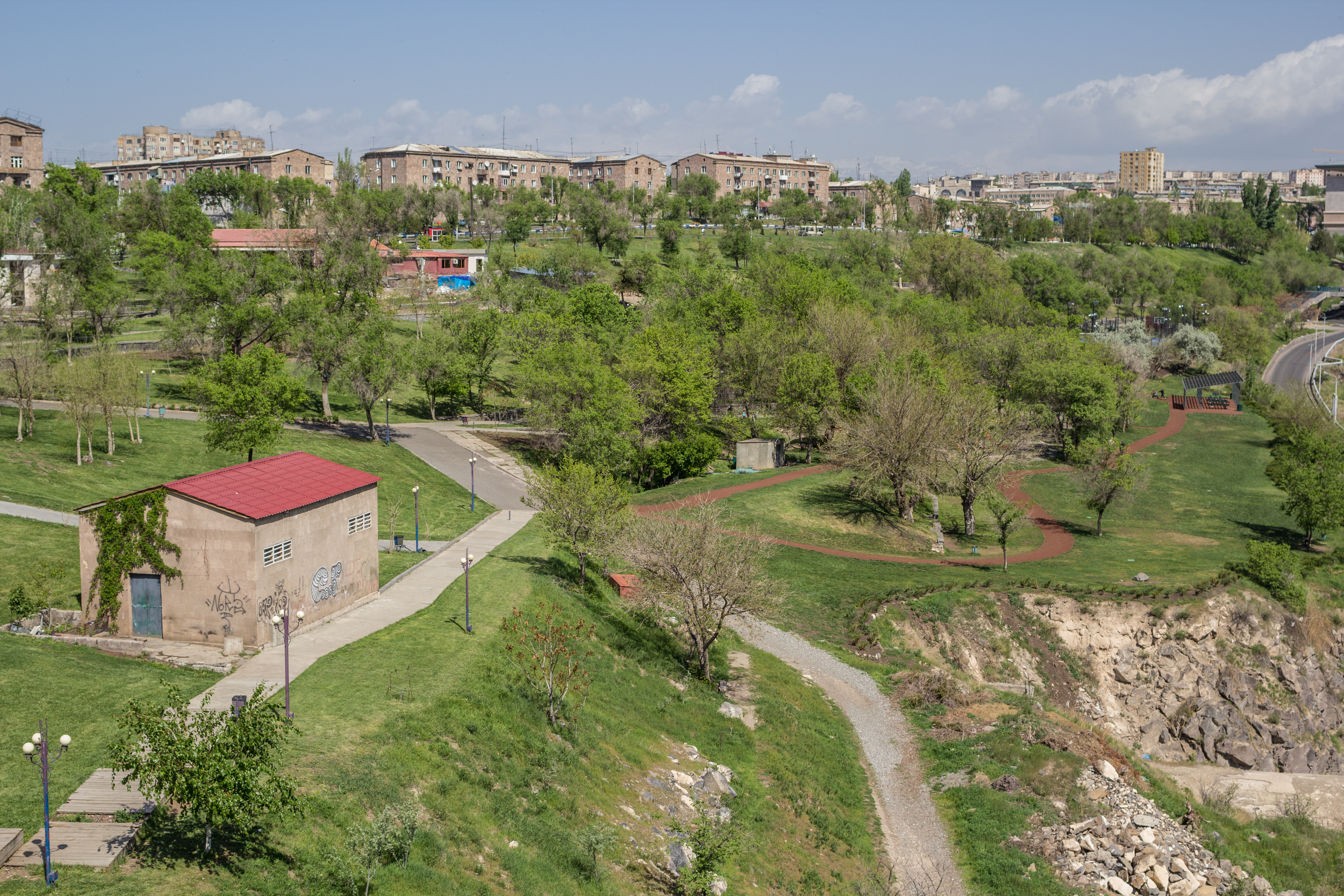
Tumanyan Park

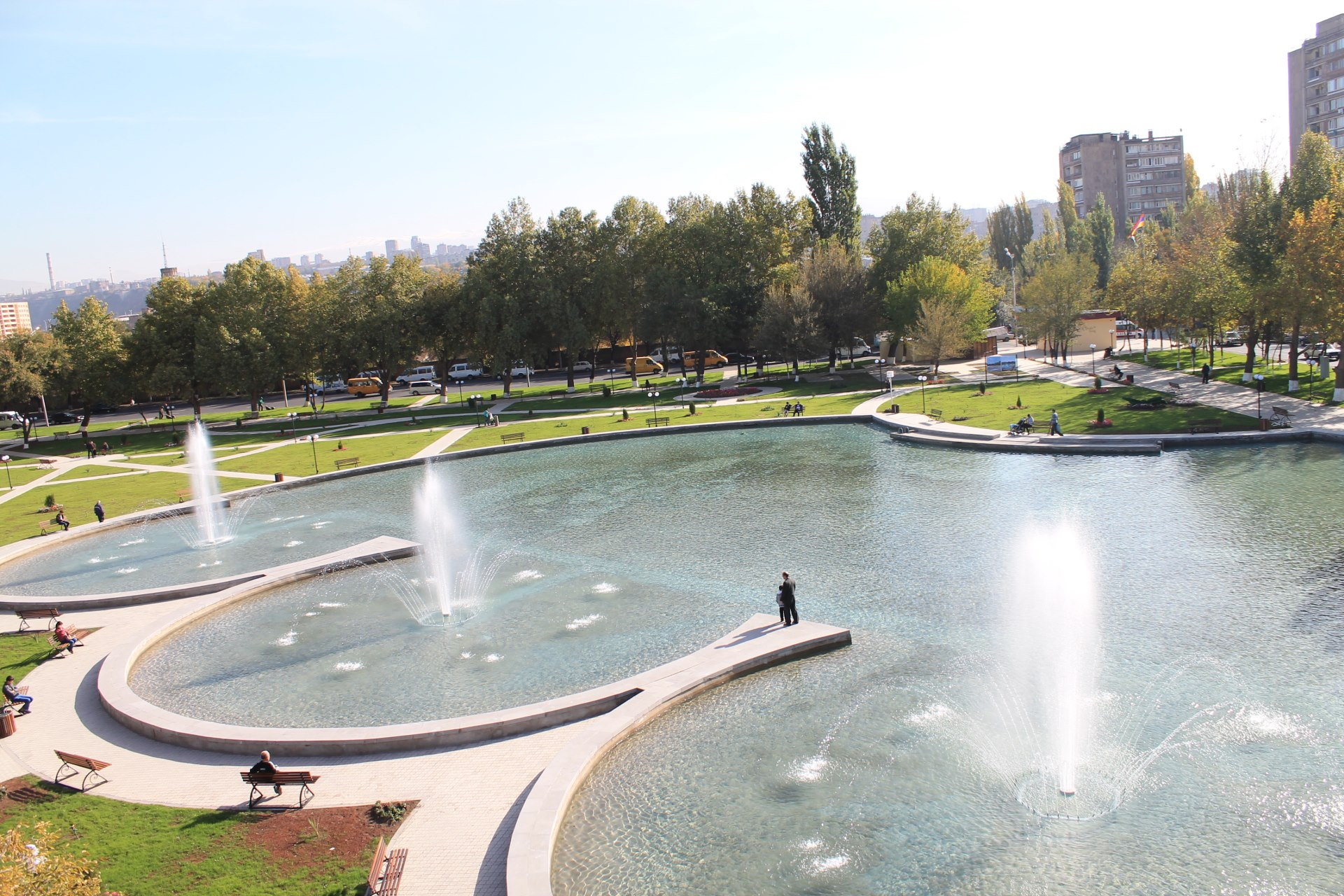
Buenos Aires Park

== Arabkir District ==
- Vahagn Davtyan Park
- Nor Arabkir Park
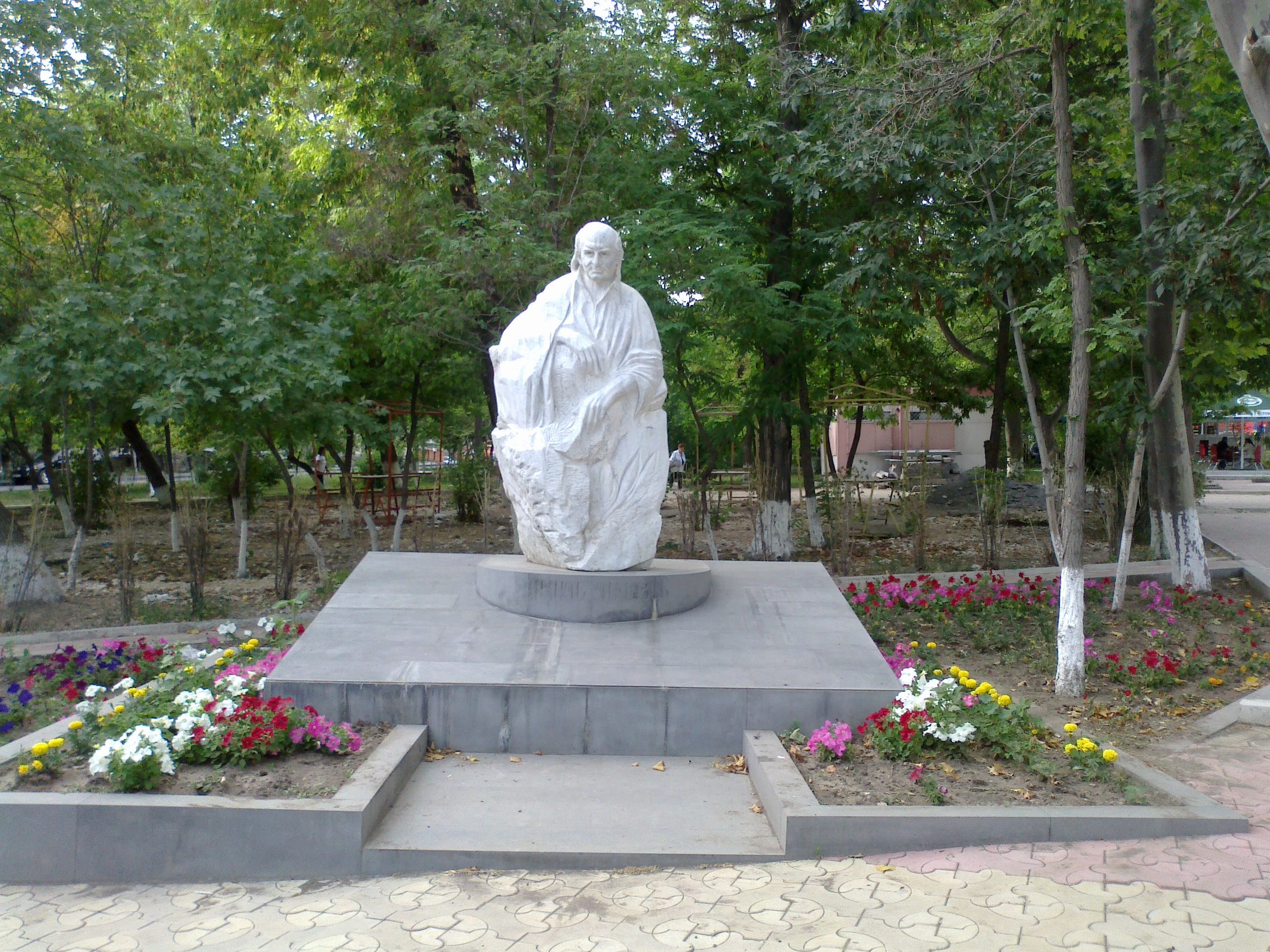
Vahagn Davtyan Park

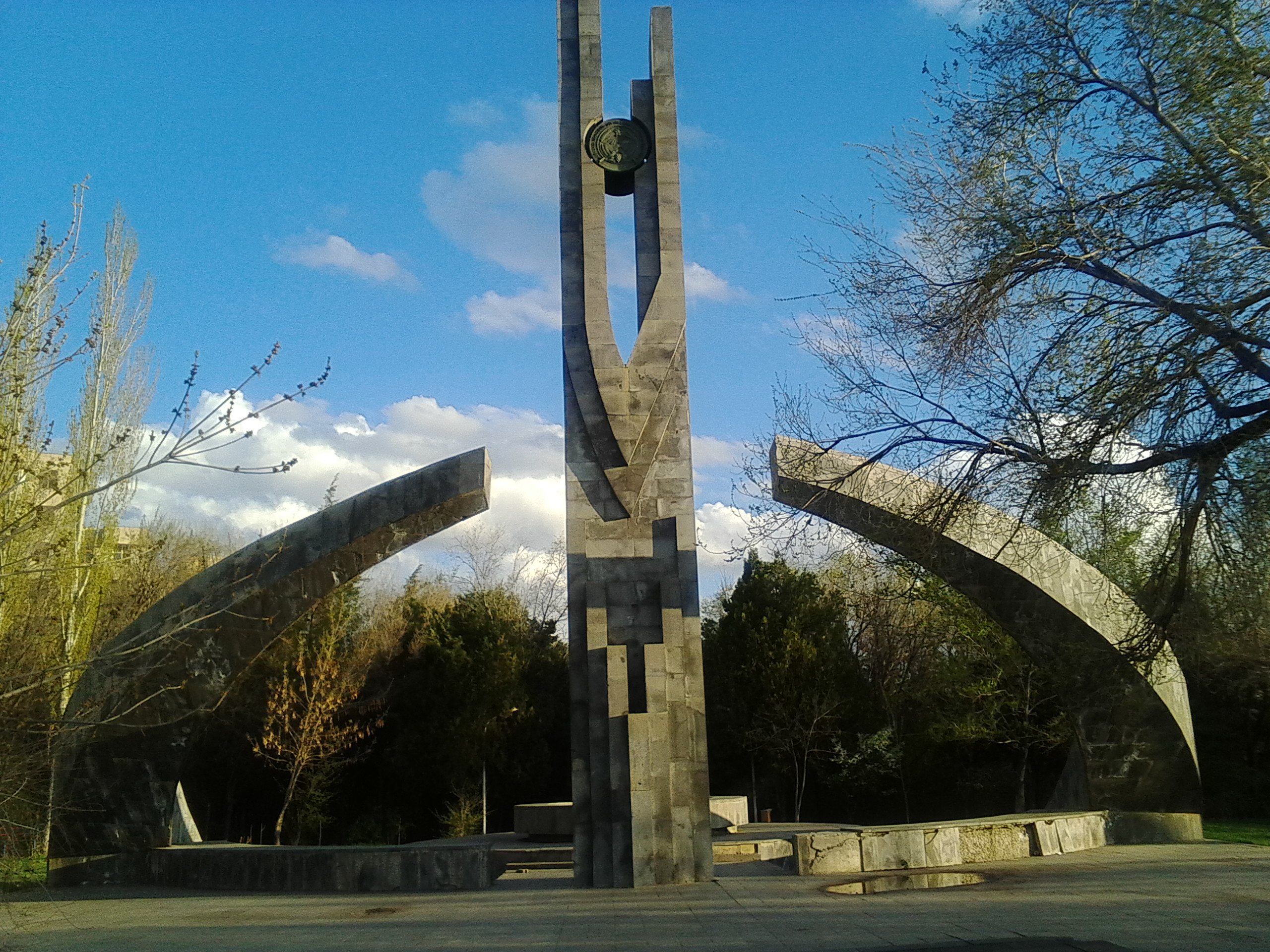
Nor Arabkir Park

== Avan District ==
- Yerevan Botanical Garden
- Avan Park
- Family Park
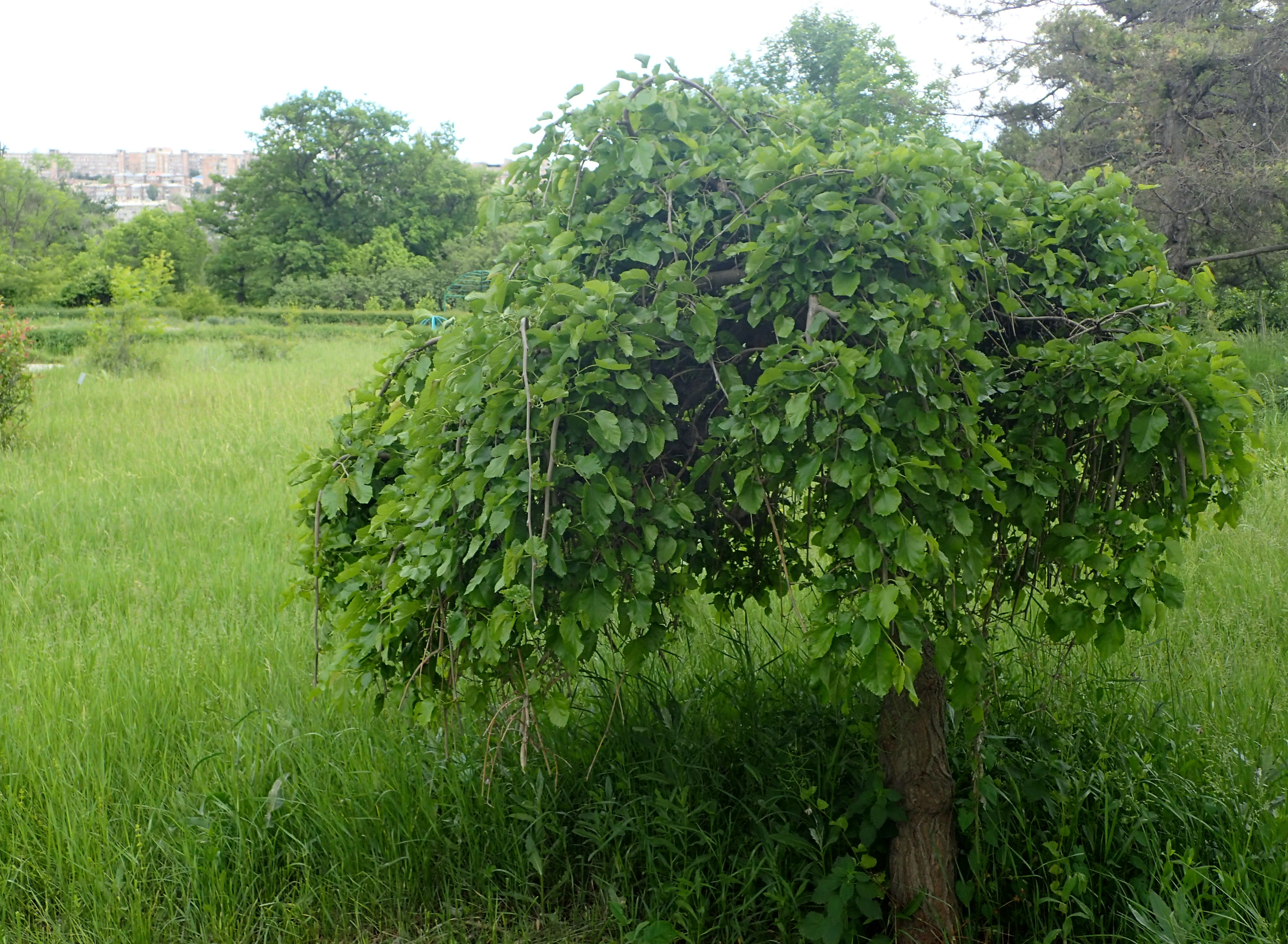
Yerevan Botanical Garden

== Davtashen District ==
- Davtashen Park

== Erebuni District ==
- Lyon Park
- Liberators' Park
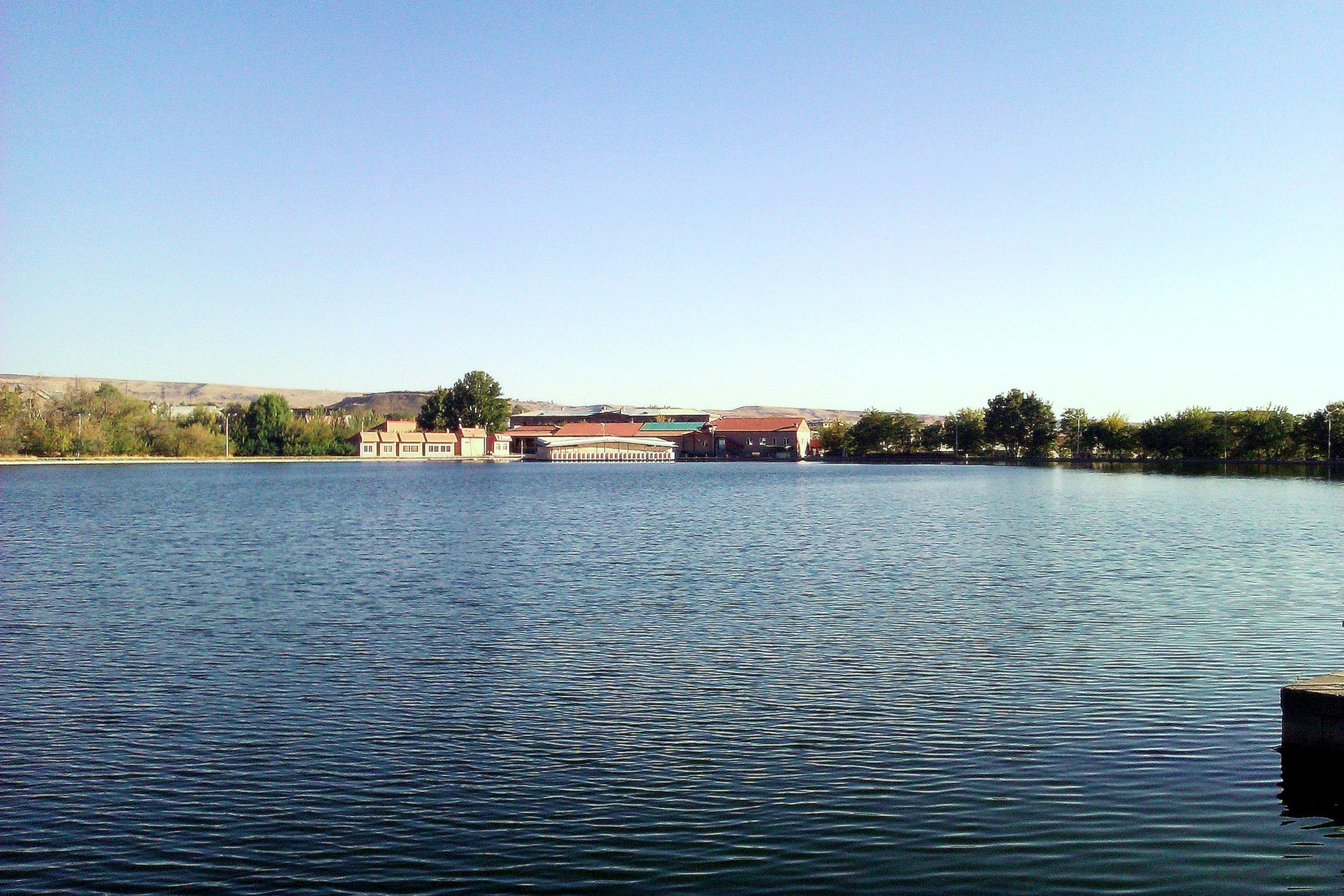
Lyon Park

== Kanaker-Zeytun District ==
- Victory Park
- David Anhaght Park
- Paruyr Sevak Garden
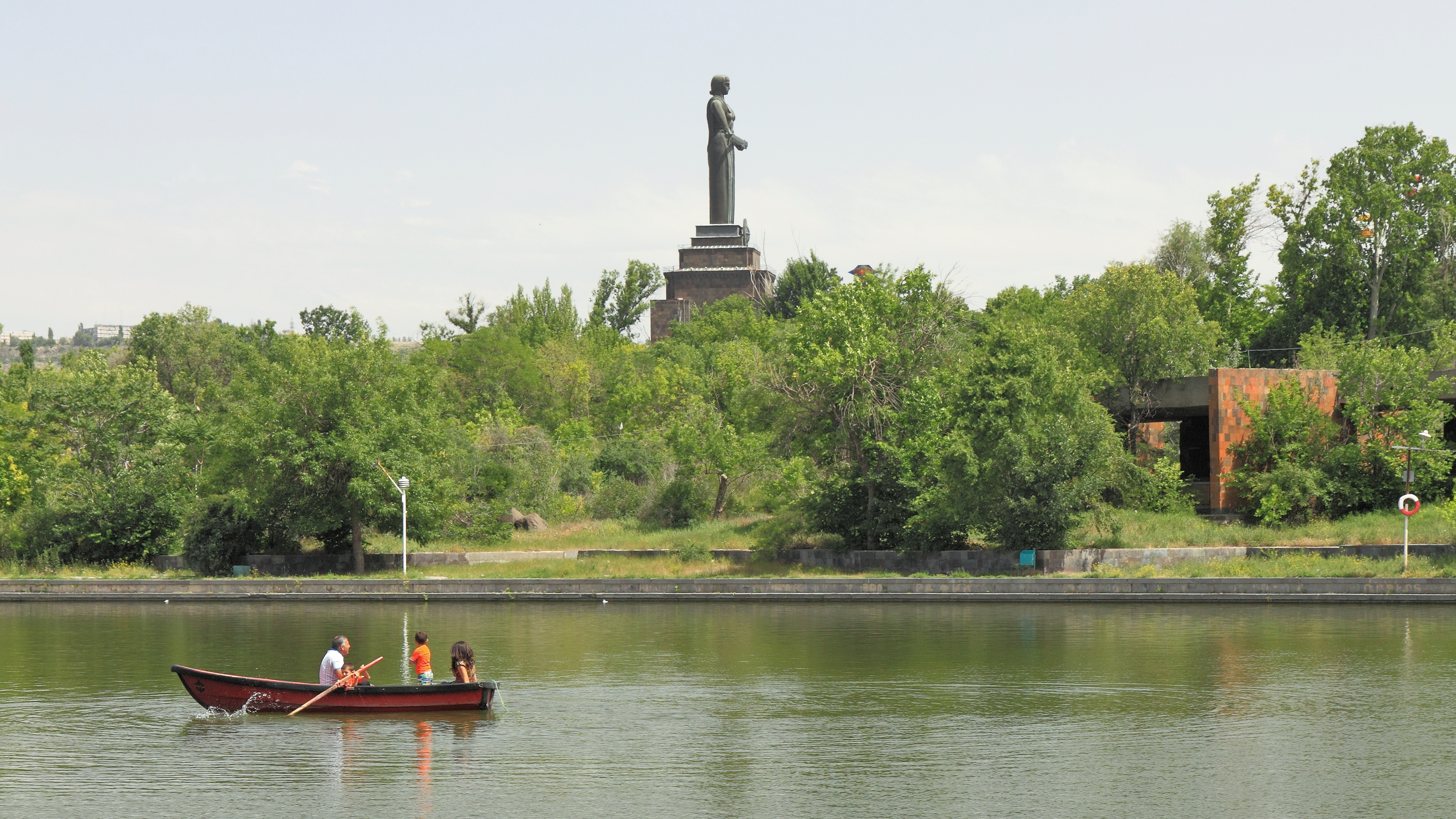
Areni lake at the Victory Park

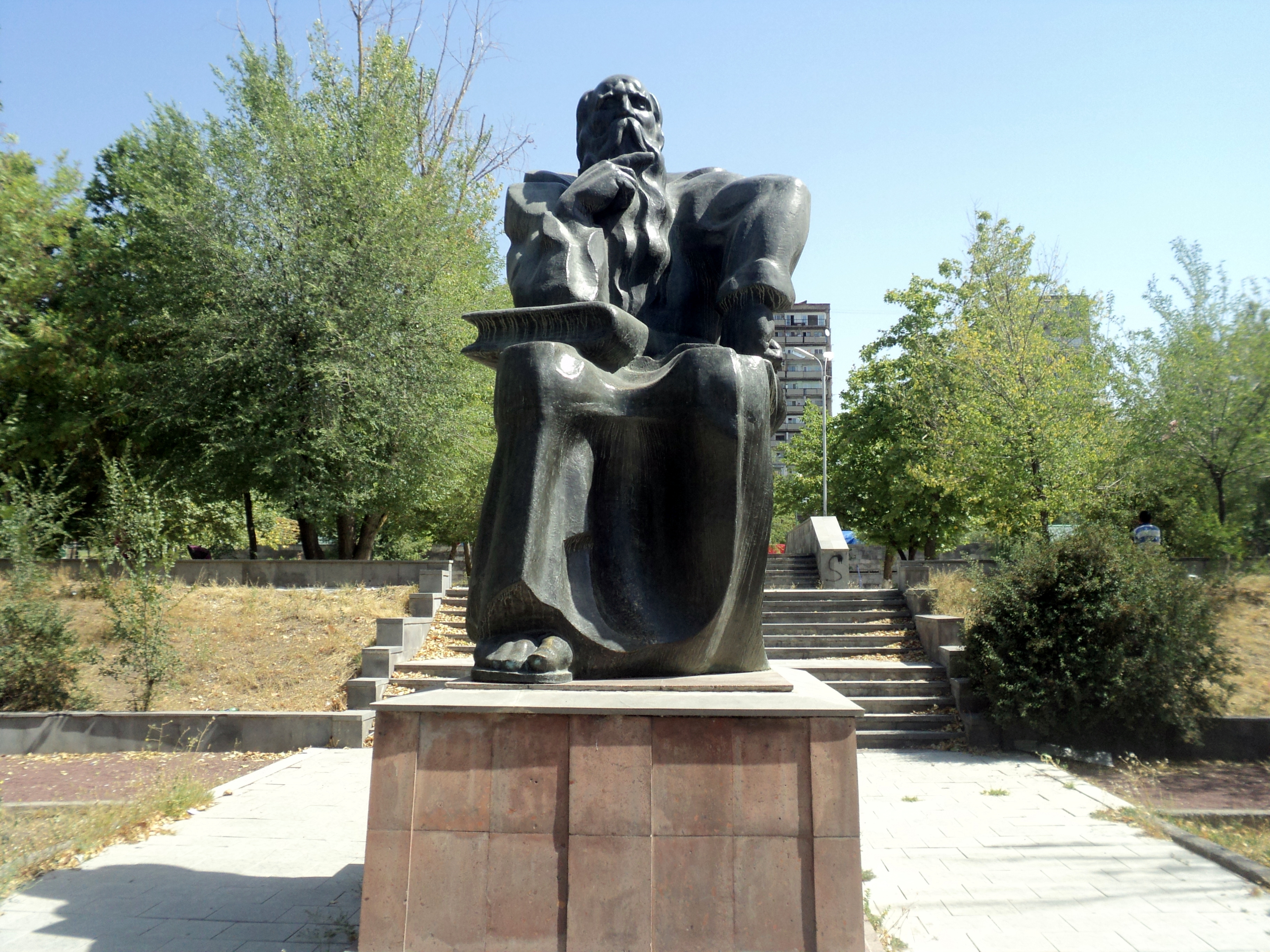
David Anhaght Park

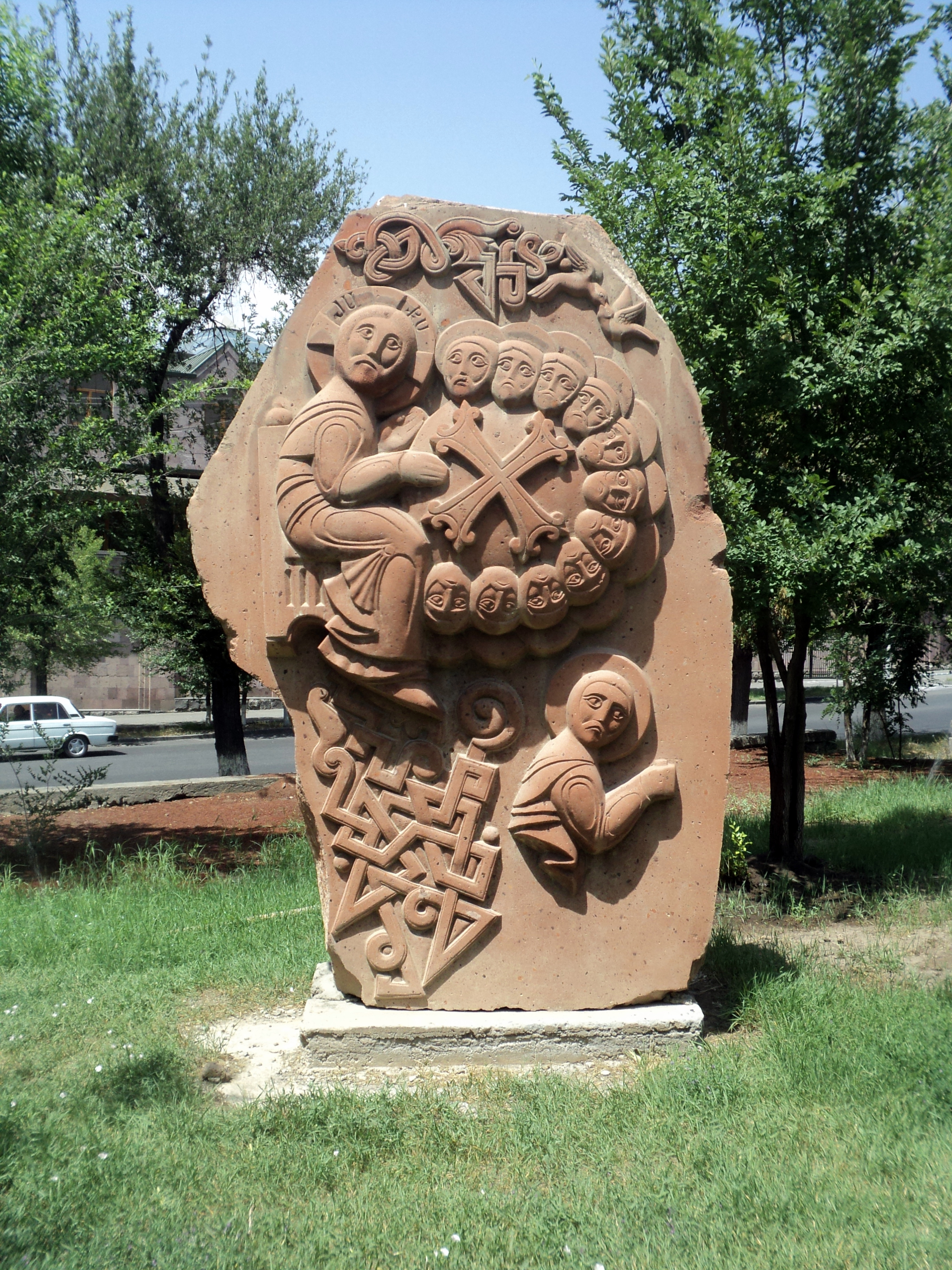
Paruyr Sevak Garden

== Kentron District ==
- English Park
- Children's Park
- Yerevan Children's railway
- Tsitsernakaberd Park
- Circular Park
- Khachatur Abovyan Park
- Lovers' Park
- Martiros Saryan Garden
- Komitas Garden
- Moscow Garden
- Shahumyan Garden
- Missak Manouchian Garden
- Cafesjian Sculpture Garden
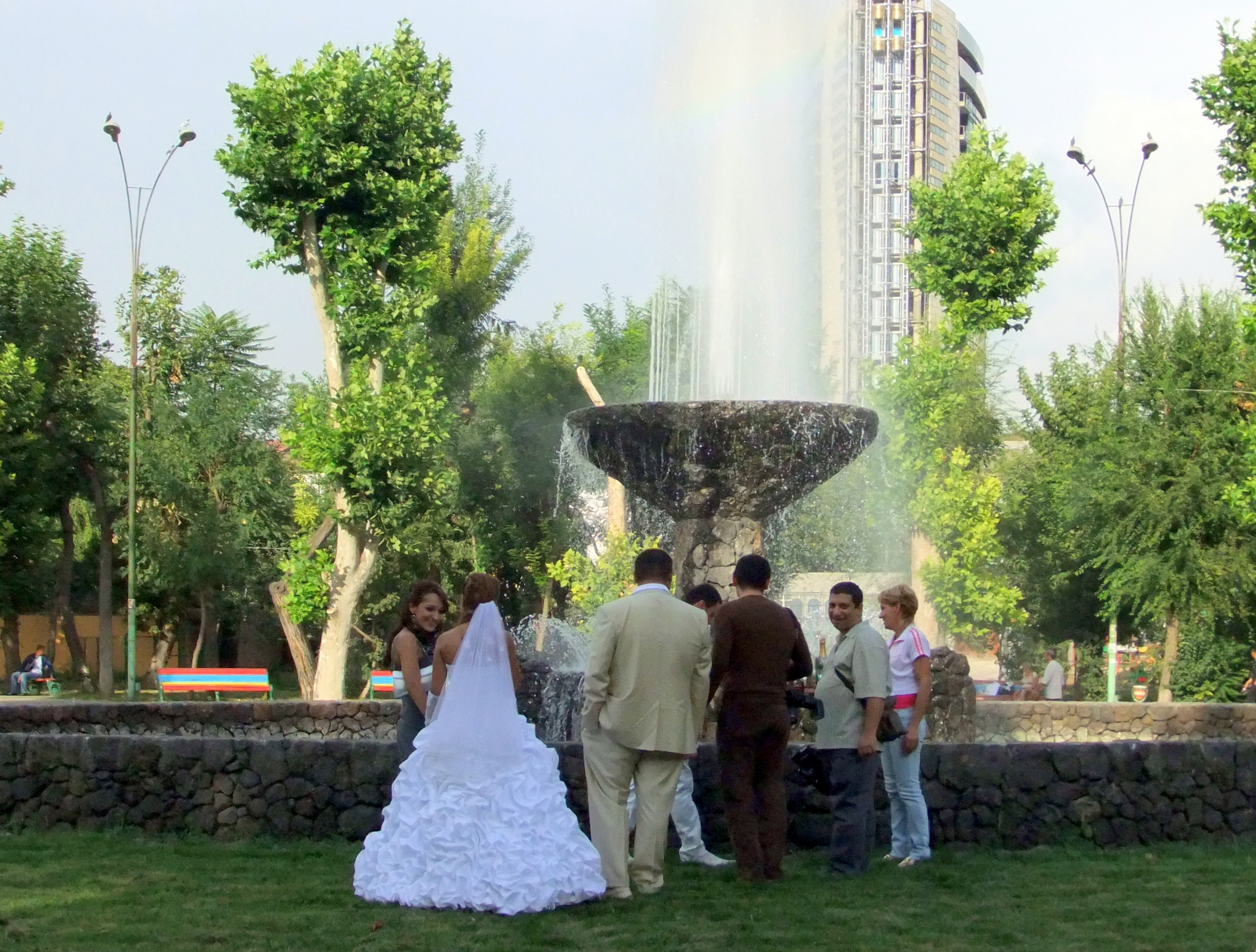
English Park

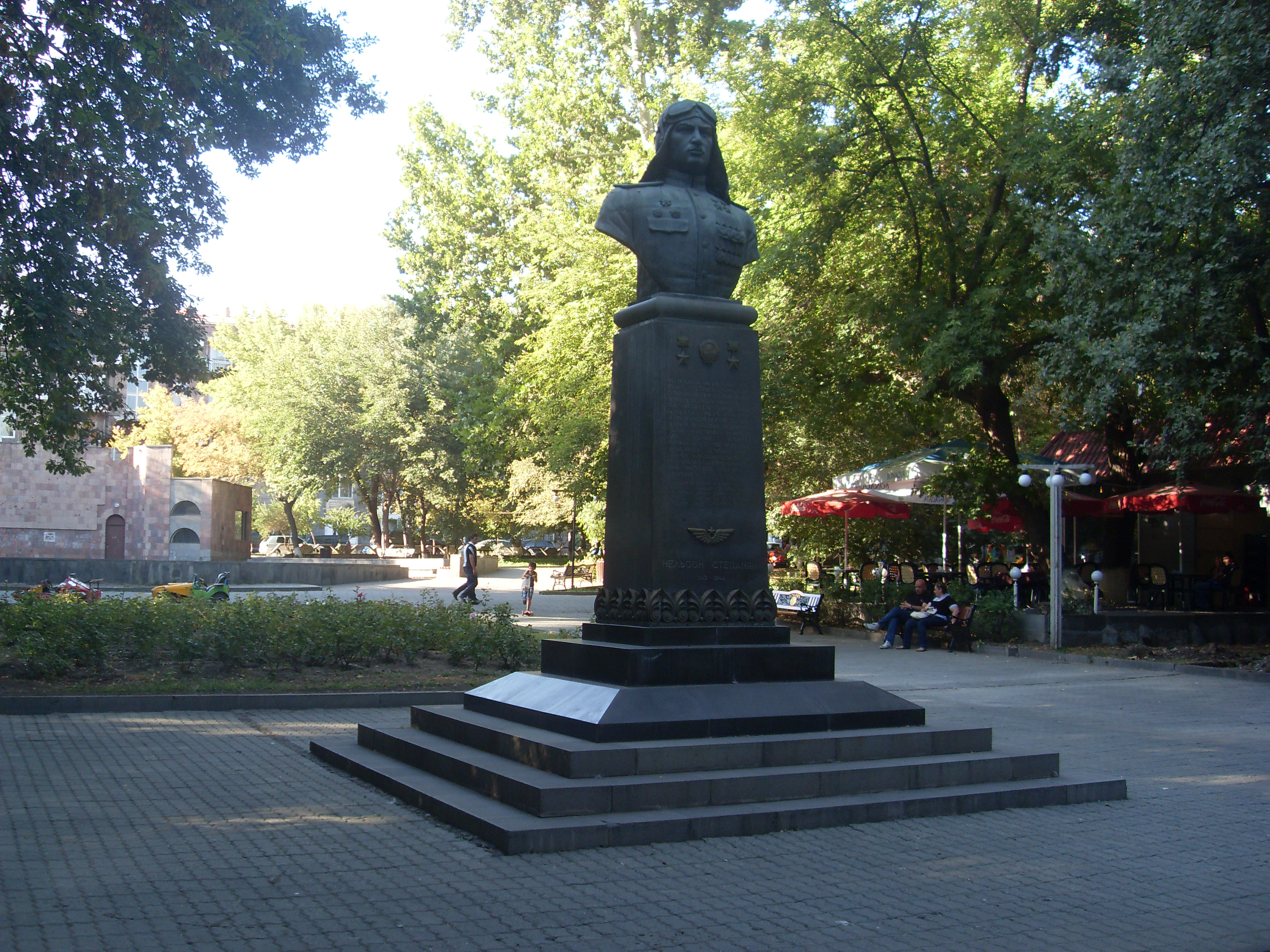
Children's Park

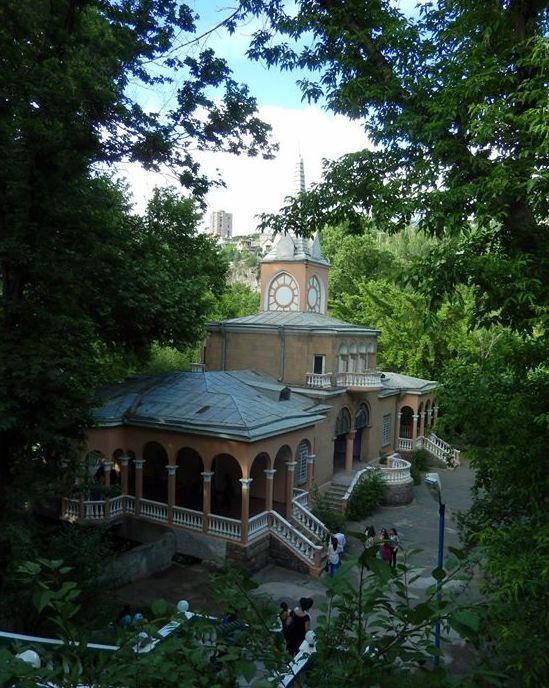
Yerevan Children's railway

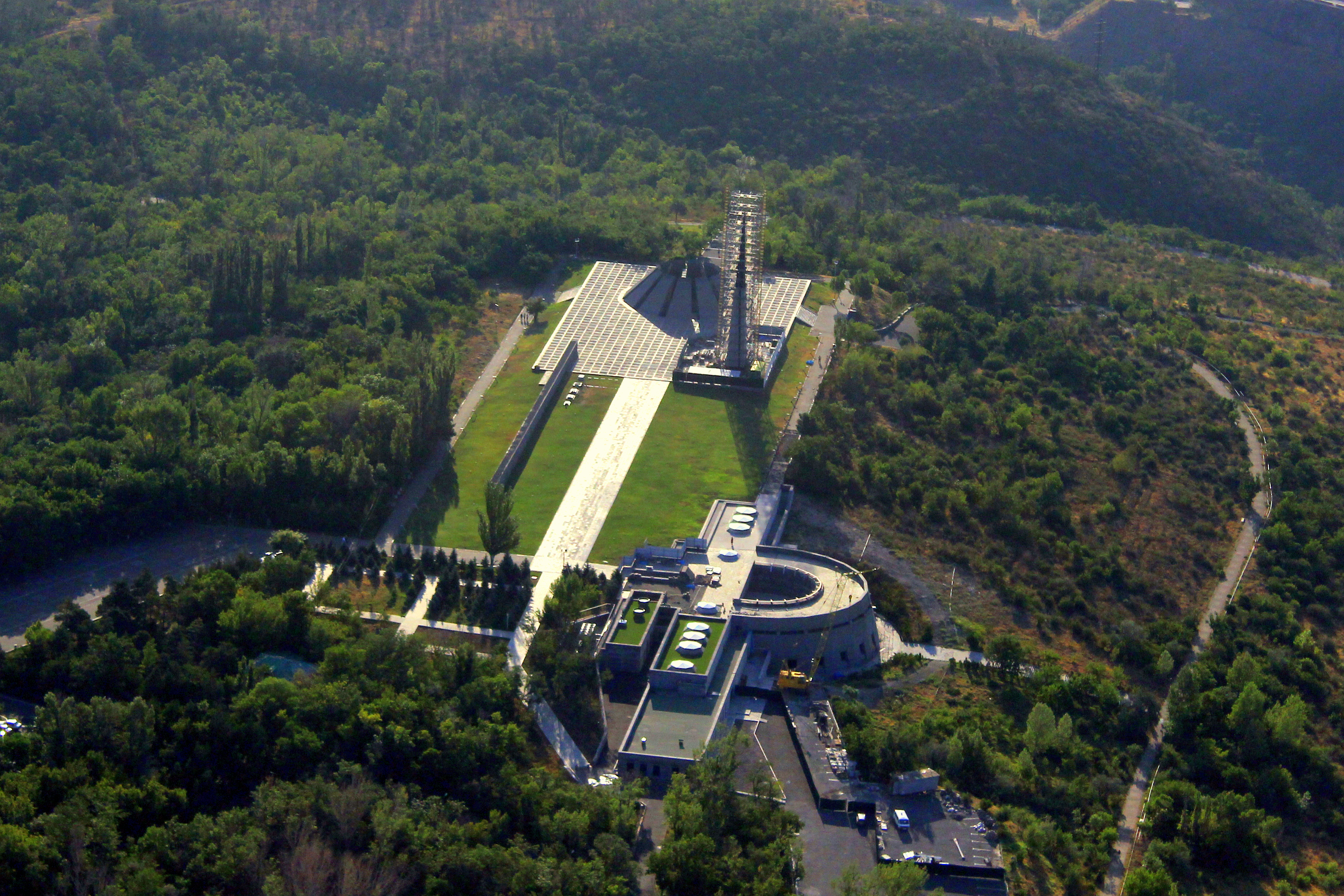
Tsitsernakaberd Park

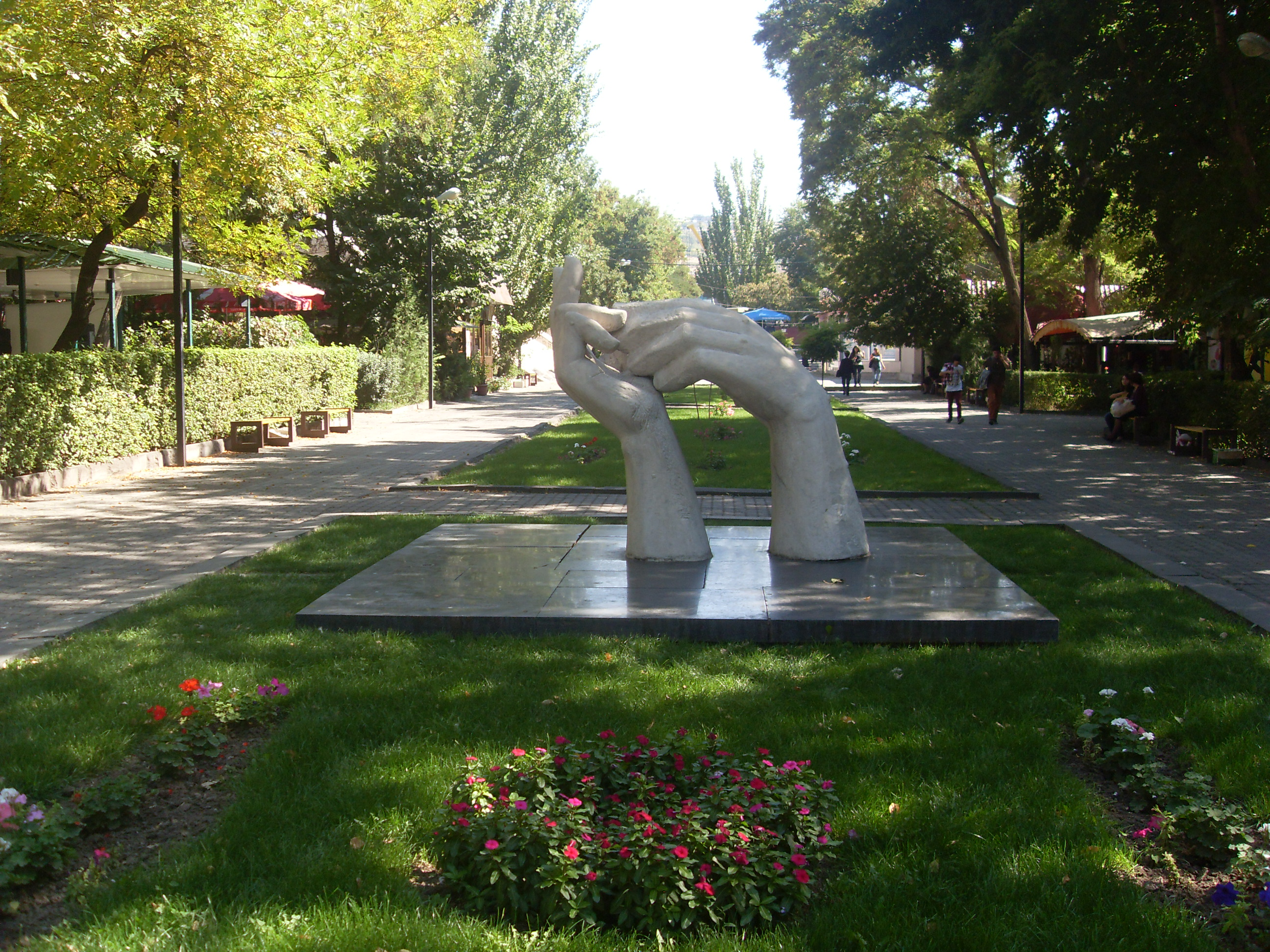
Circular Park

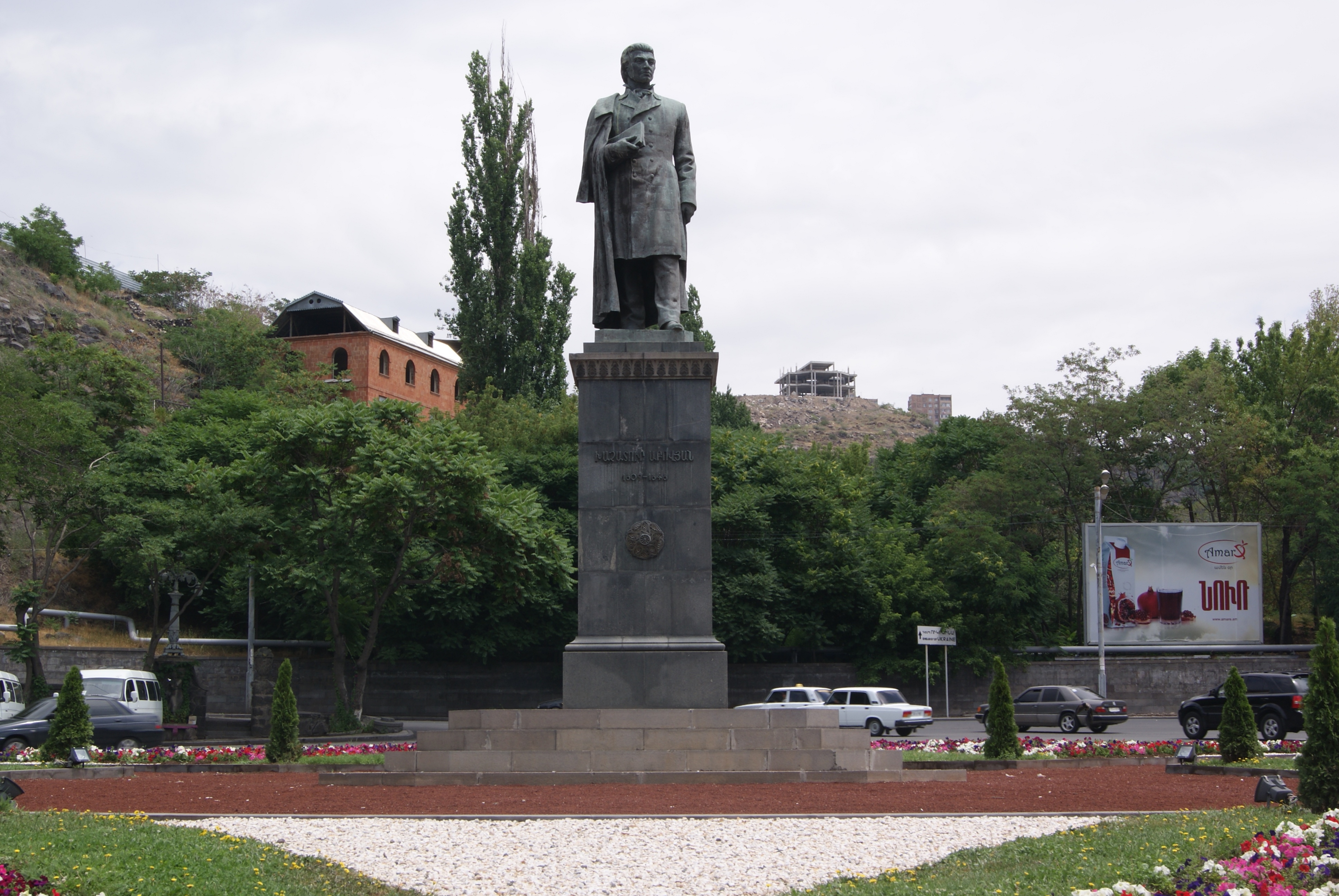
Khachatur Abovyan Park

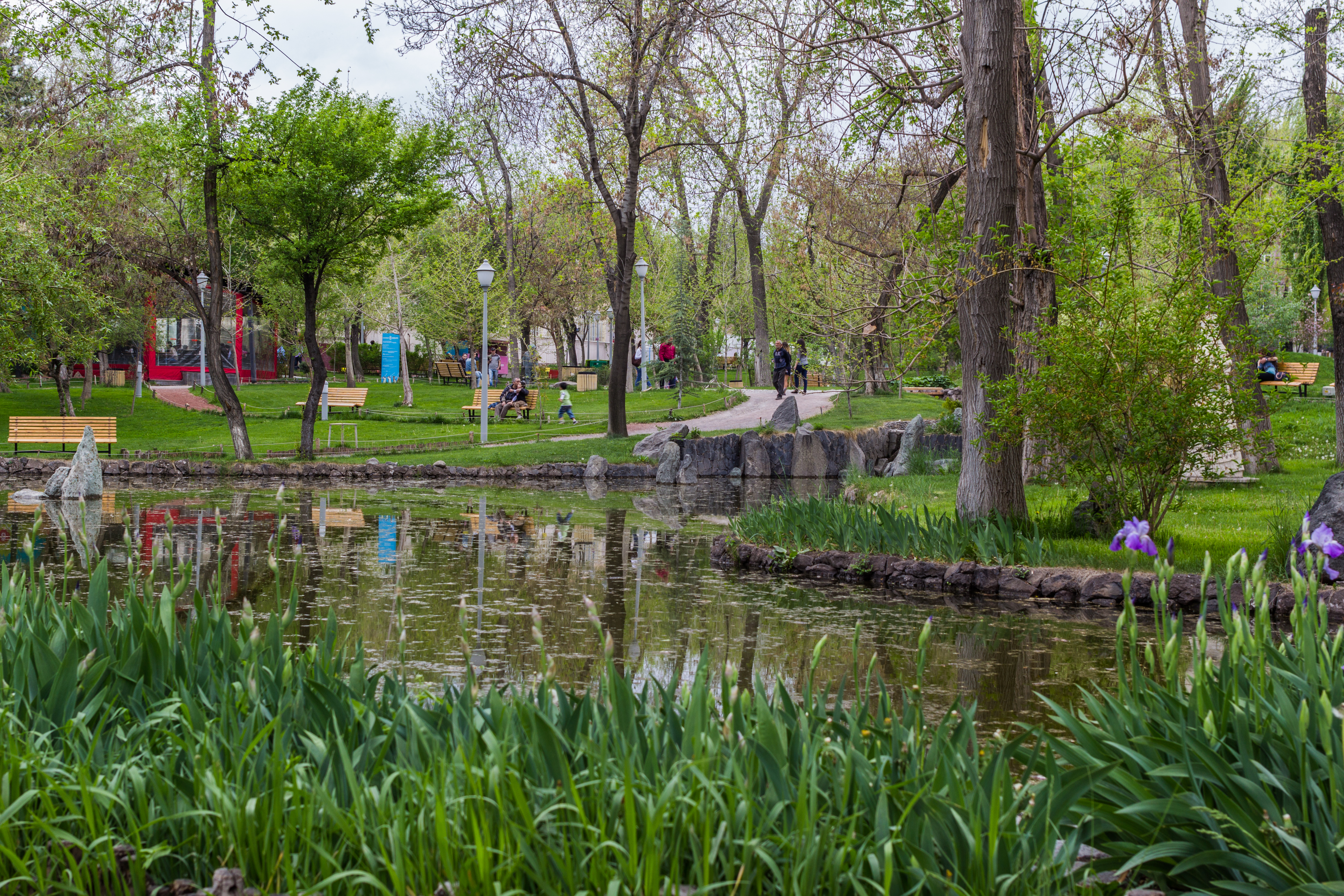
Lovers' Park

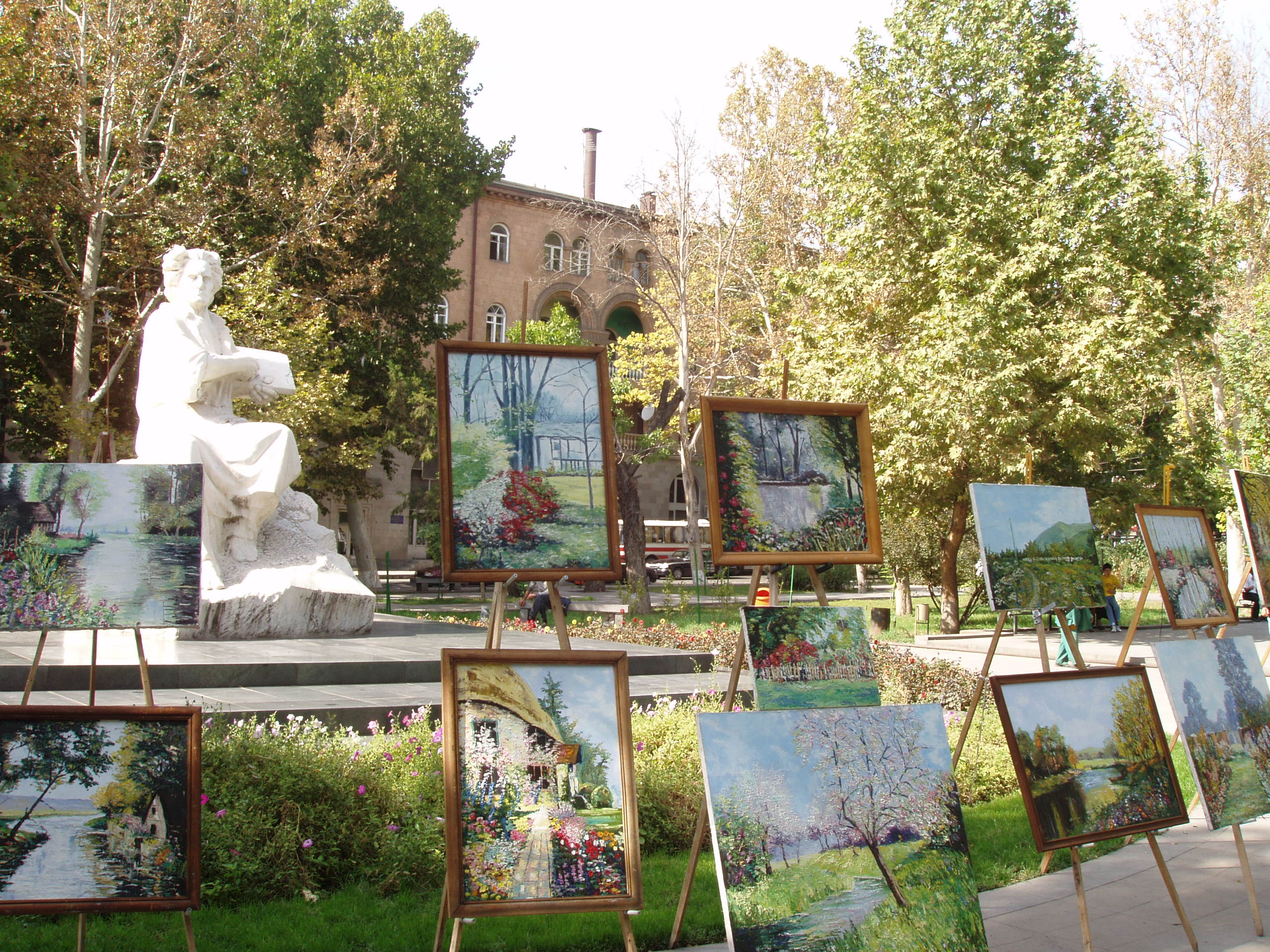
Martiros Saryan Garden

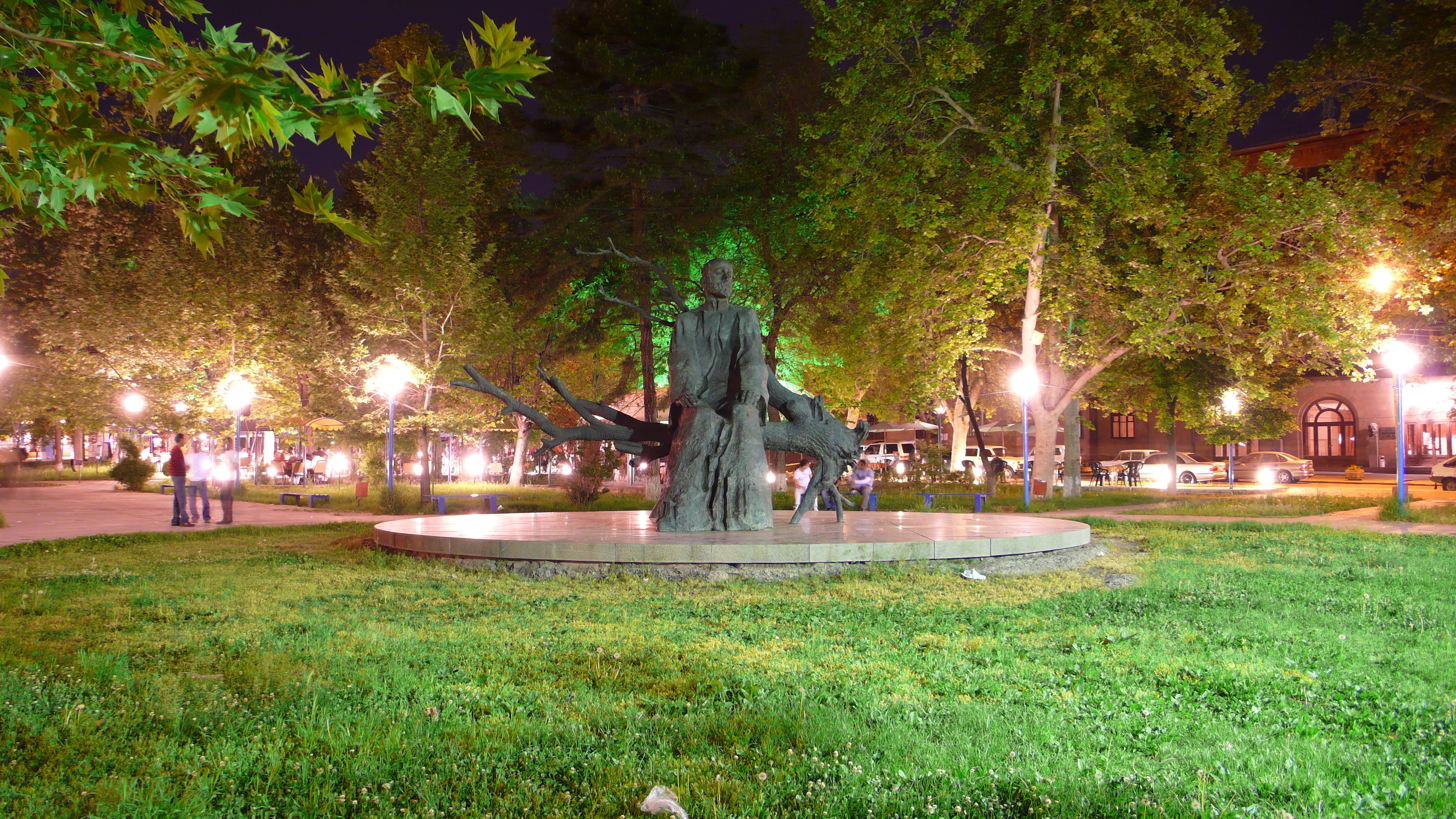
Komitas Garden

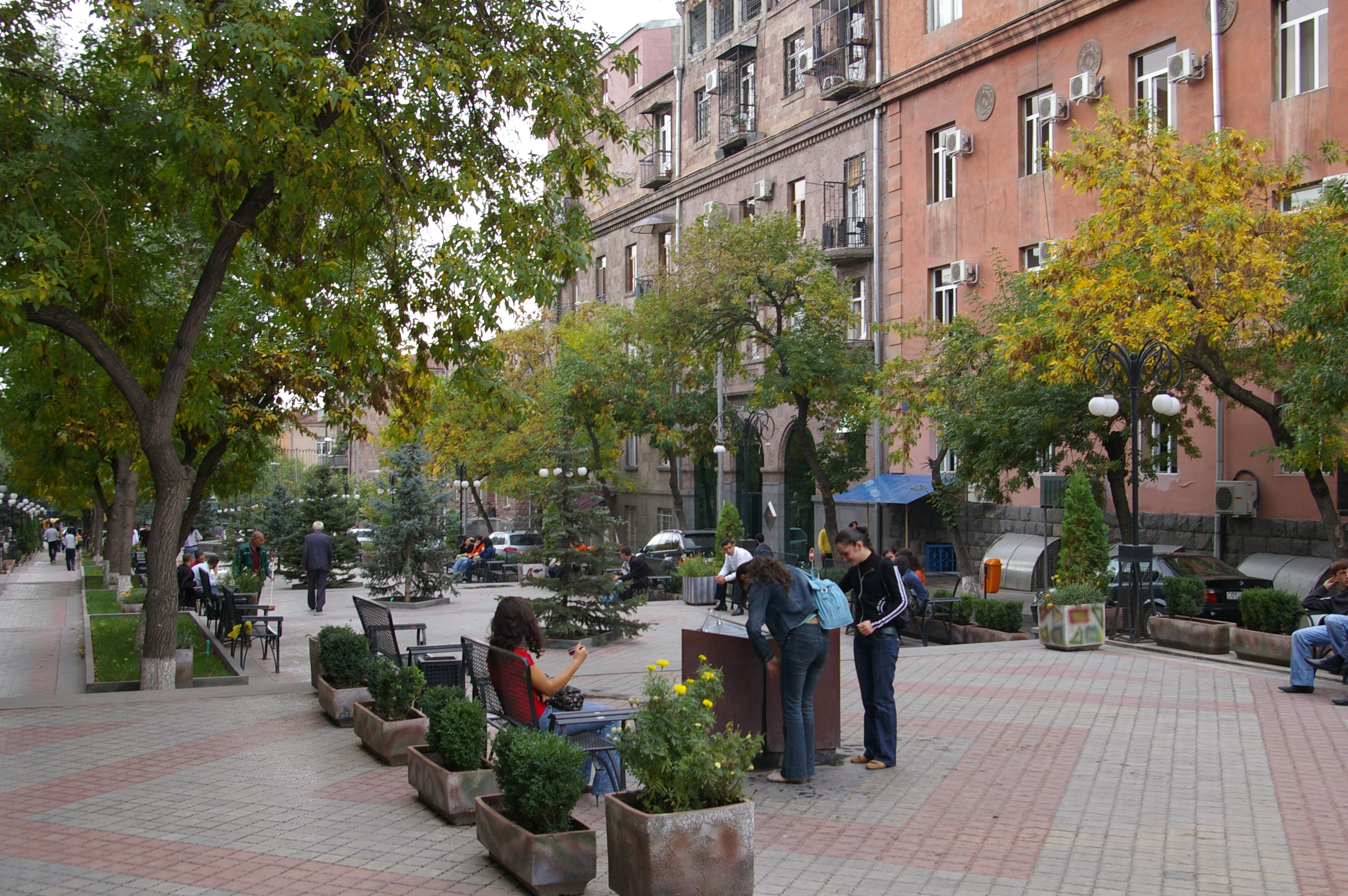
Moscow Garden

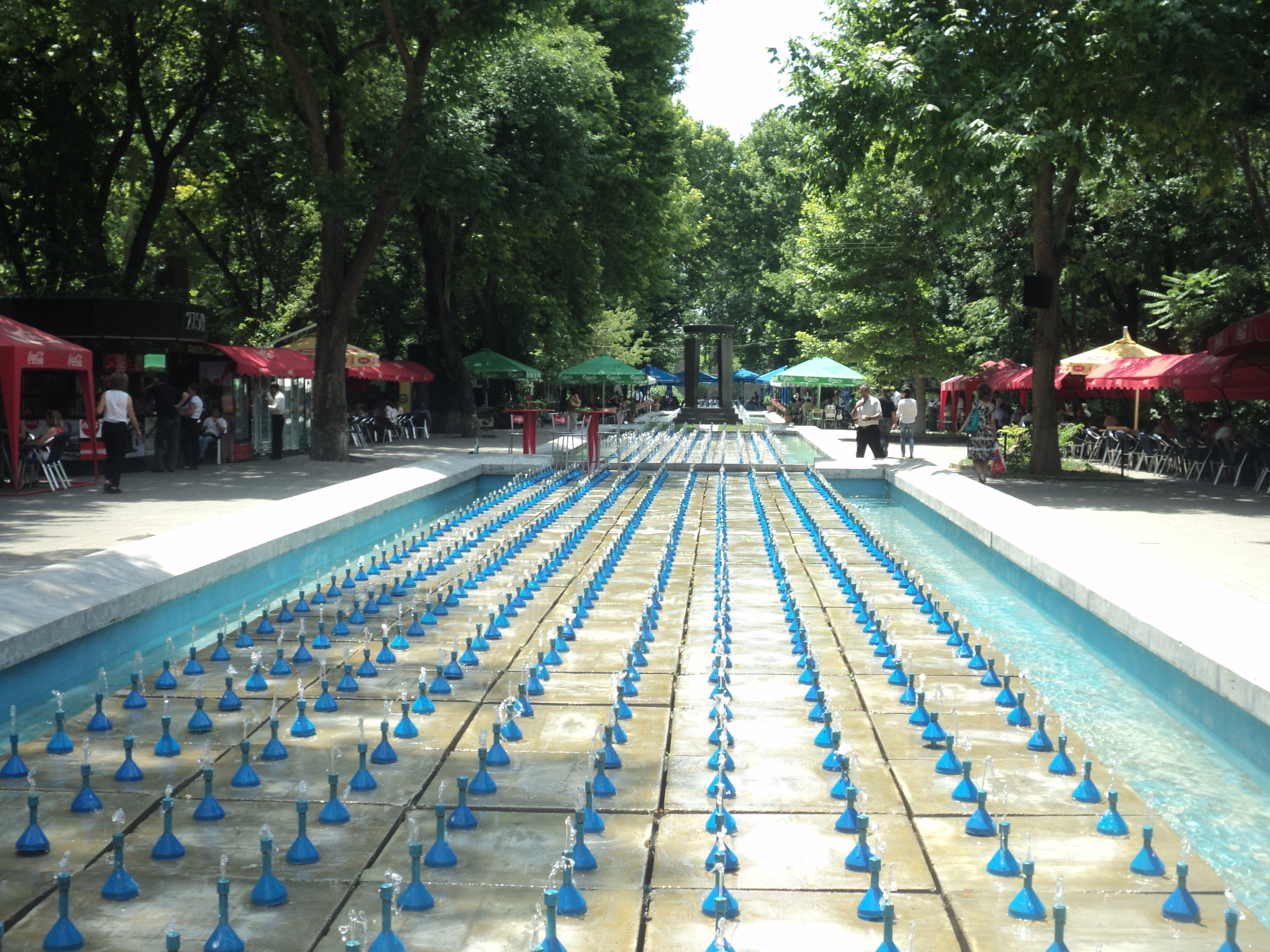
Shahumyan Garden

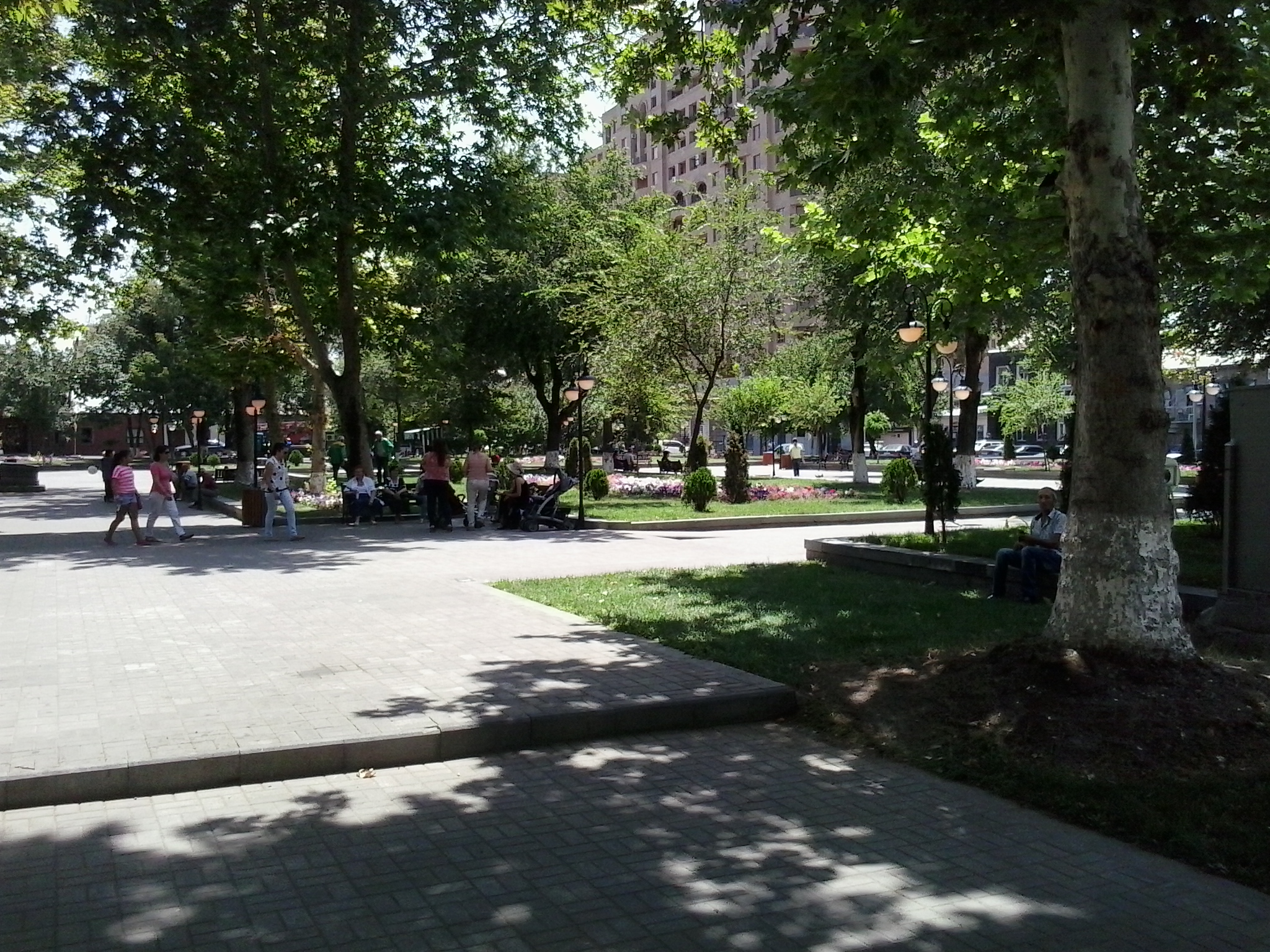
Missak Manouchian Garden

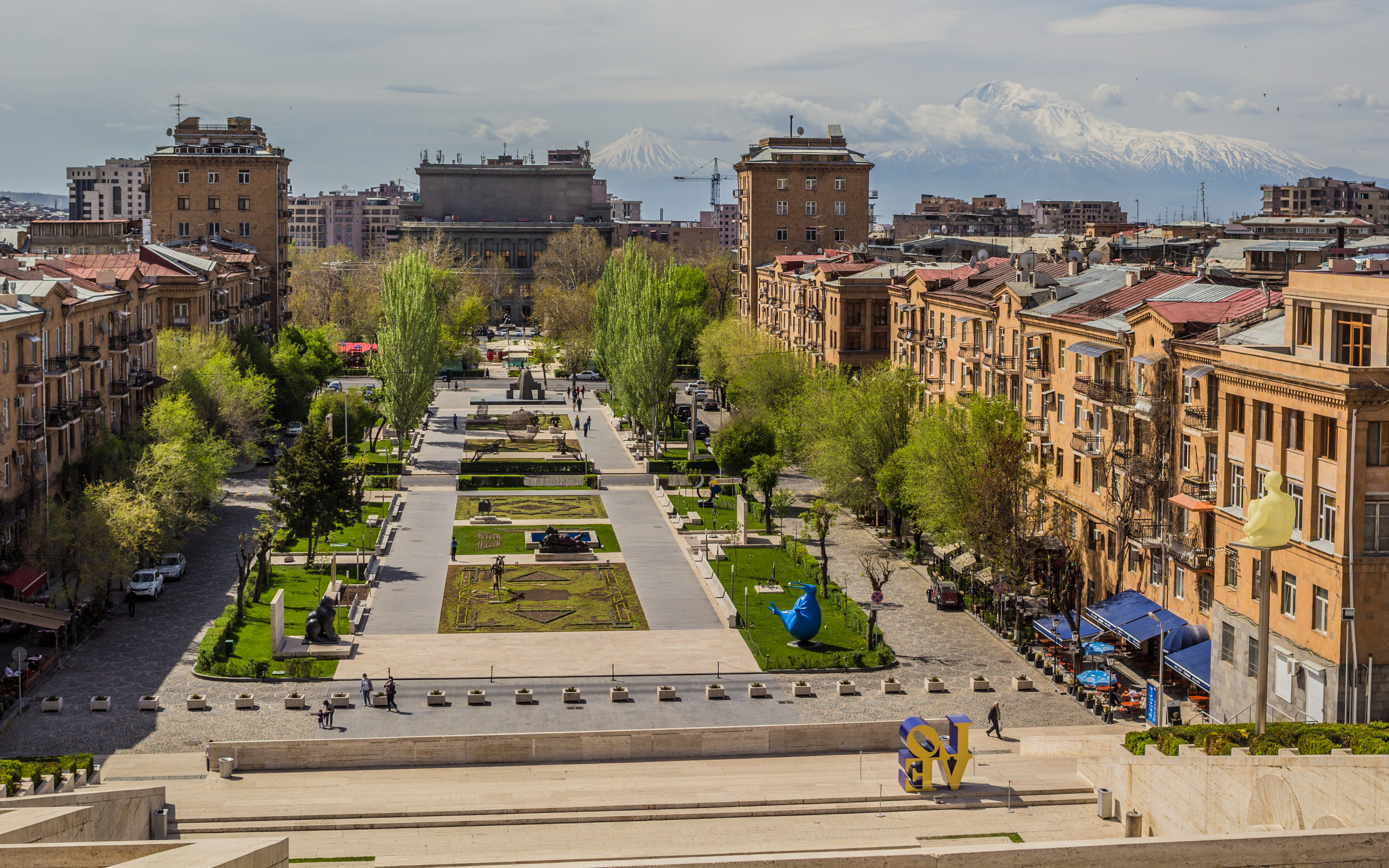
Cafesjian Sculpture Garden

== Malatia-Sebastia District ==
- Yerevan Park
- Patriotic War Memorial Park
- Youth Park
- Vahan Zatikyan Park
- Malatia Garden
- Maternity Park
- Love and Faith Park
- Yuri Bakhshyan Park
- Italian Park
- Chinar Garden
- Yerablur Park and Pantheon
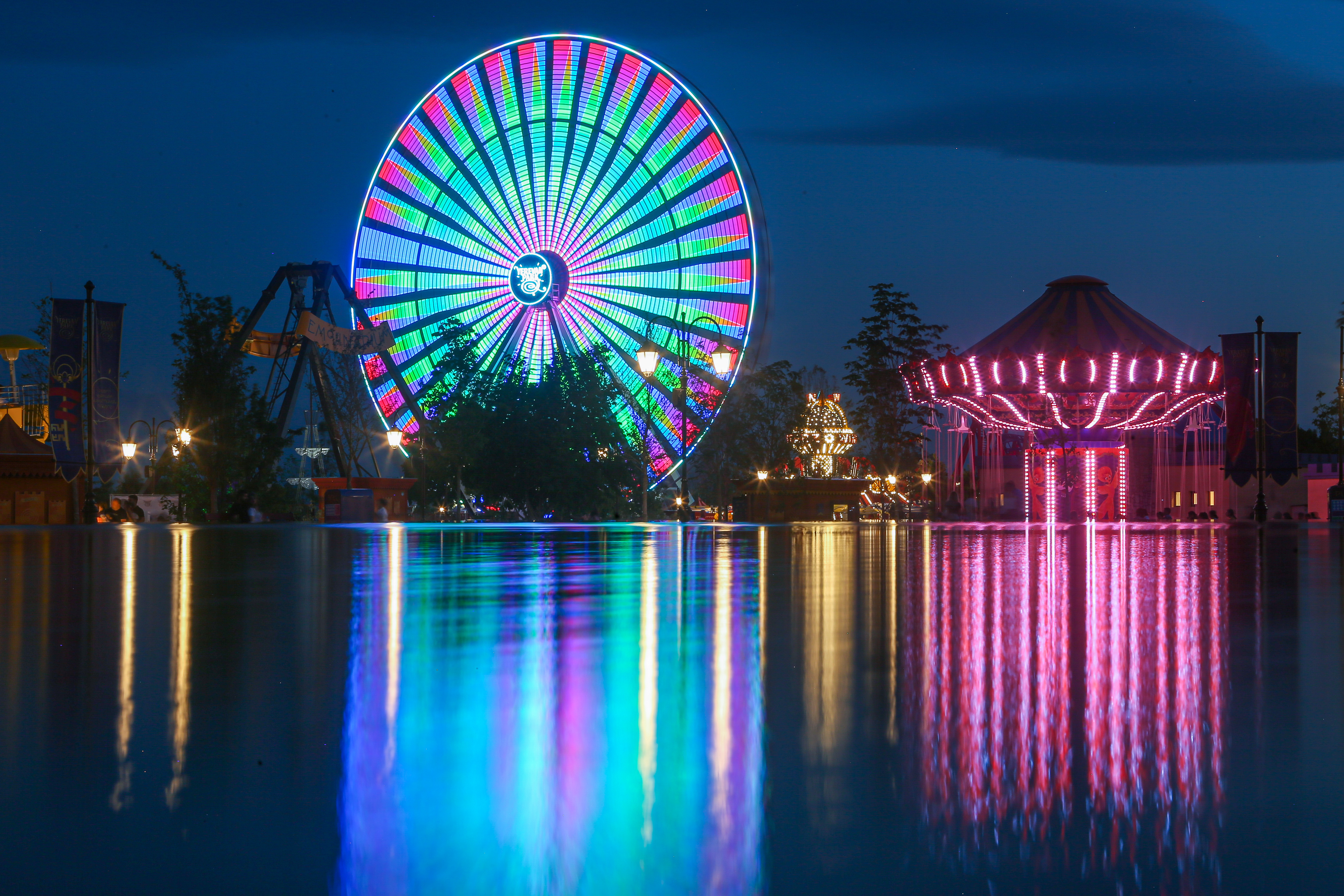
Yerevan Park

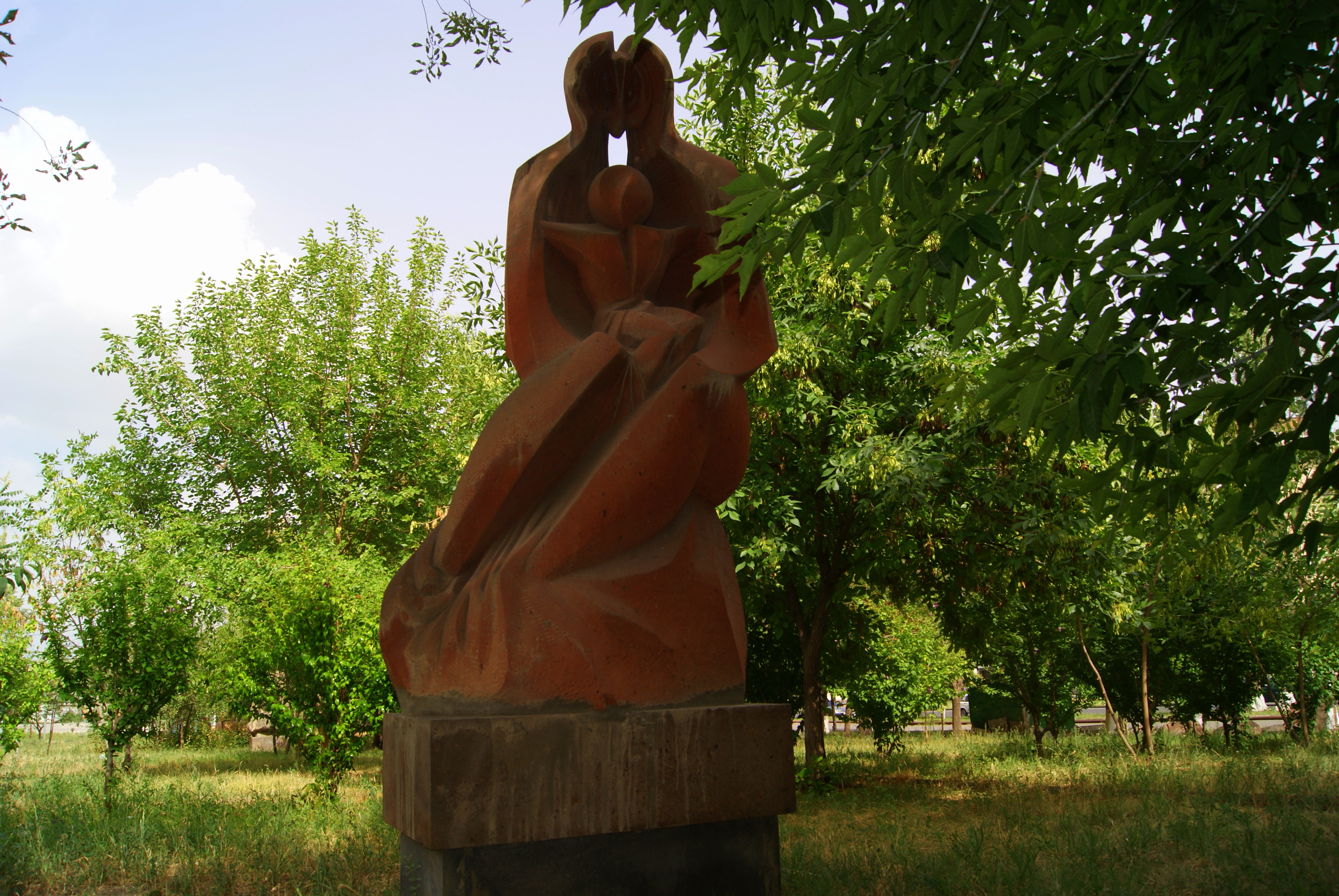
Vahan Zatikyan Park

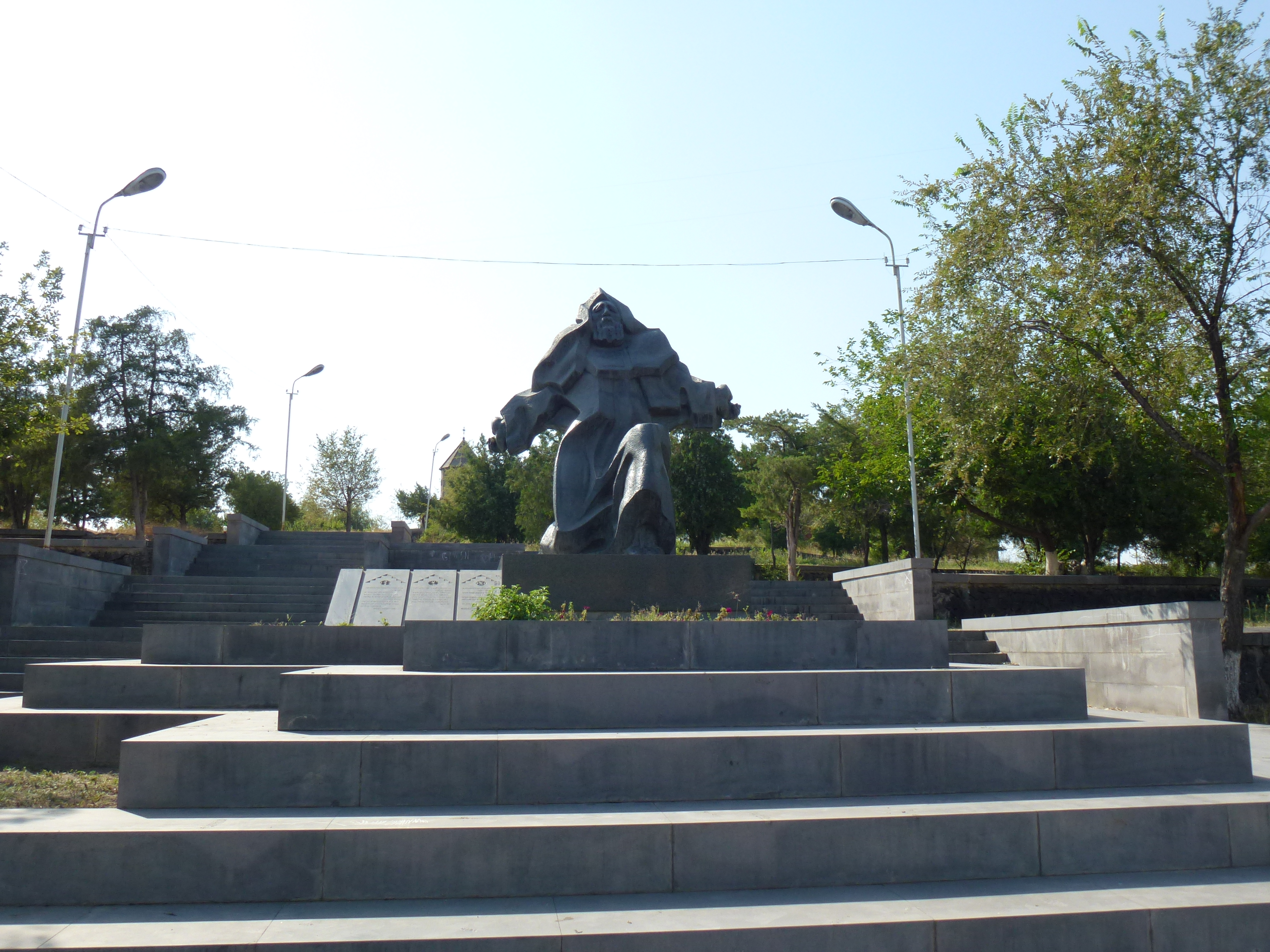
Malatia Garden

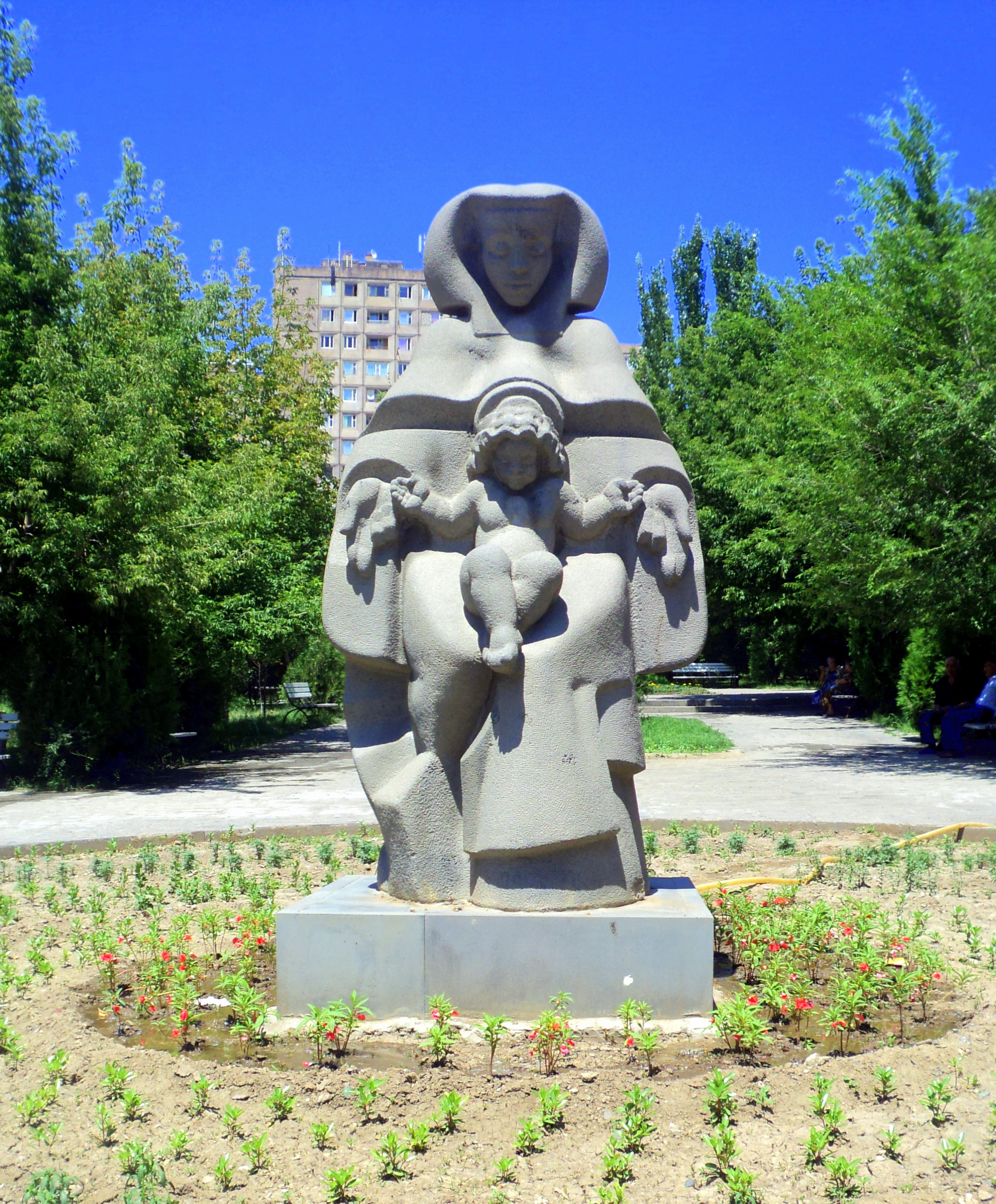
Maternity Park

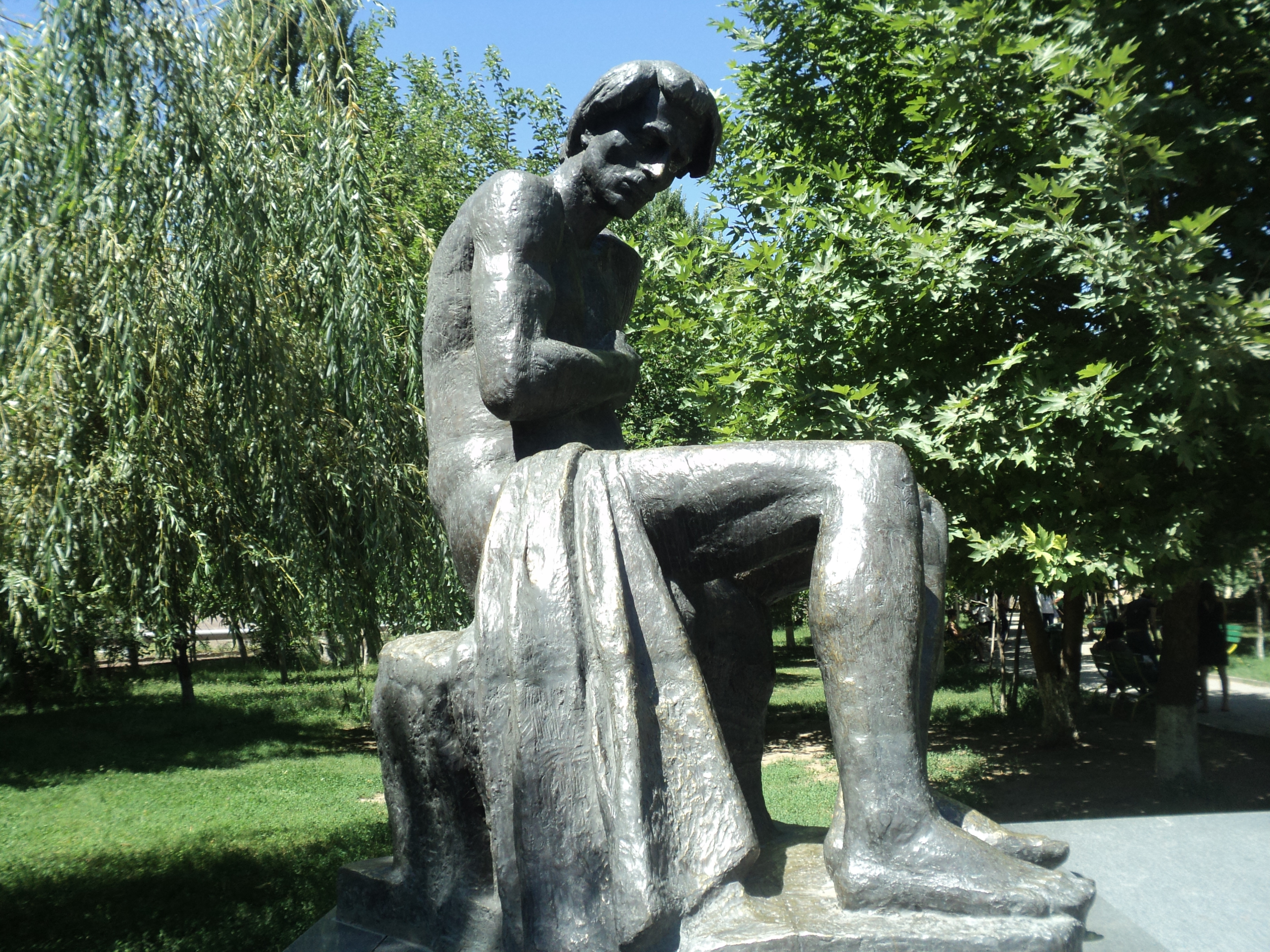
Chinar Garden

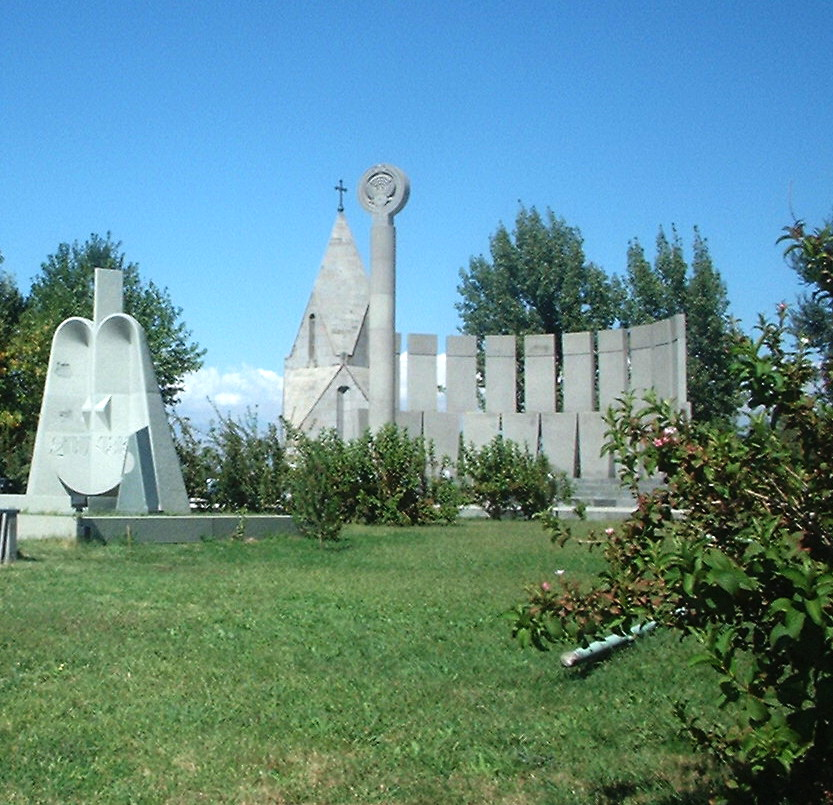
Yerablur Park

== Nork-Marash District ==
- Nork Gardens

== Nor Nork District ==
- Yerevan Zoo
- Fridtjof Nansen Park
- Tatul Krpeyan Park
- Vaspurakan Park
- Tigranes the Great Park
- Suren Nazaryan Garden
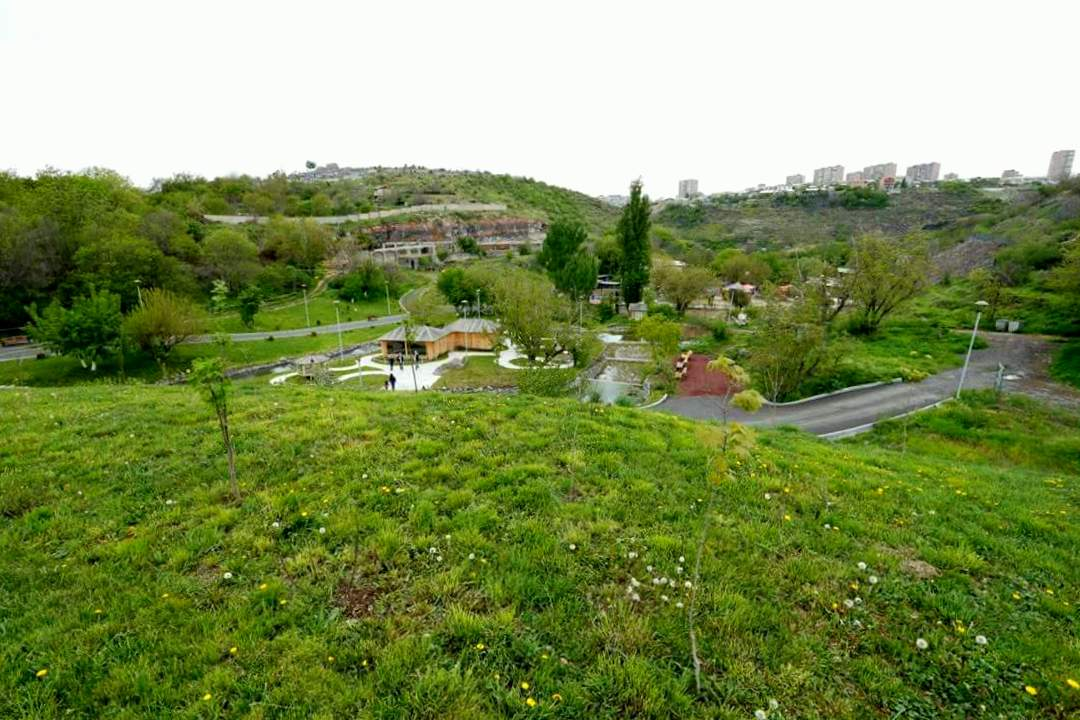
Yerevan Zoo

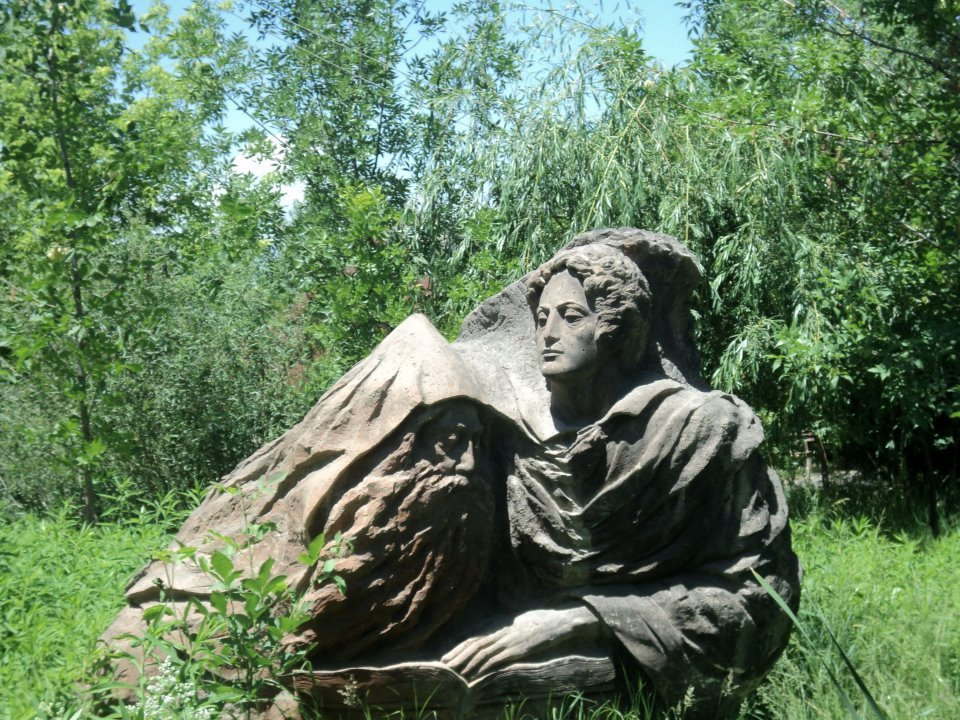
Fridtjof Nansen Park

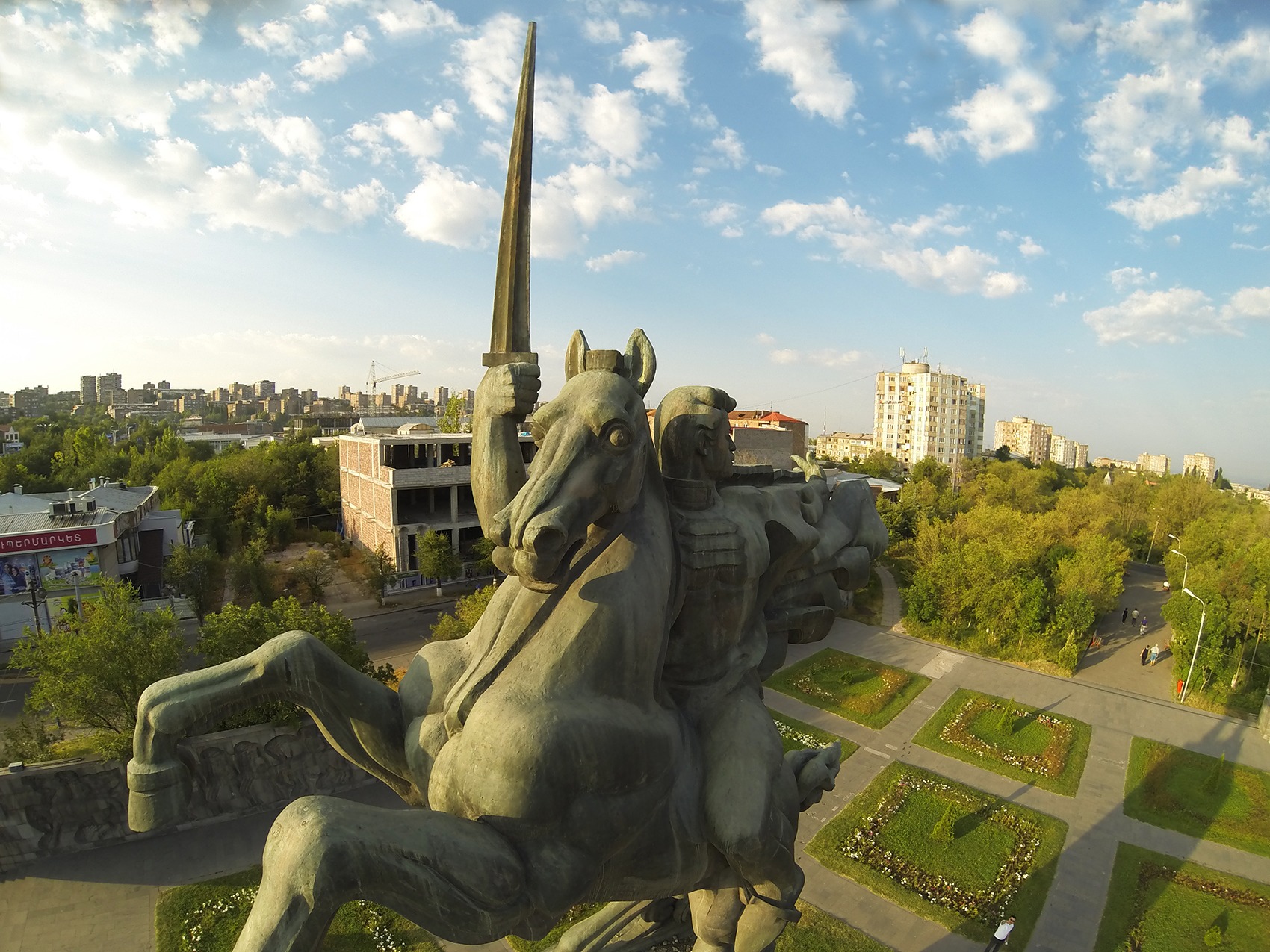
Suren Nazaryan Garden

== Nubarashen District ==
- Nubarashen Central Park
- Nubar Nubarian Park
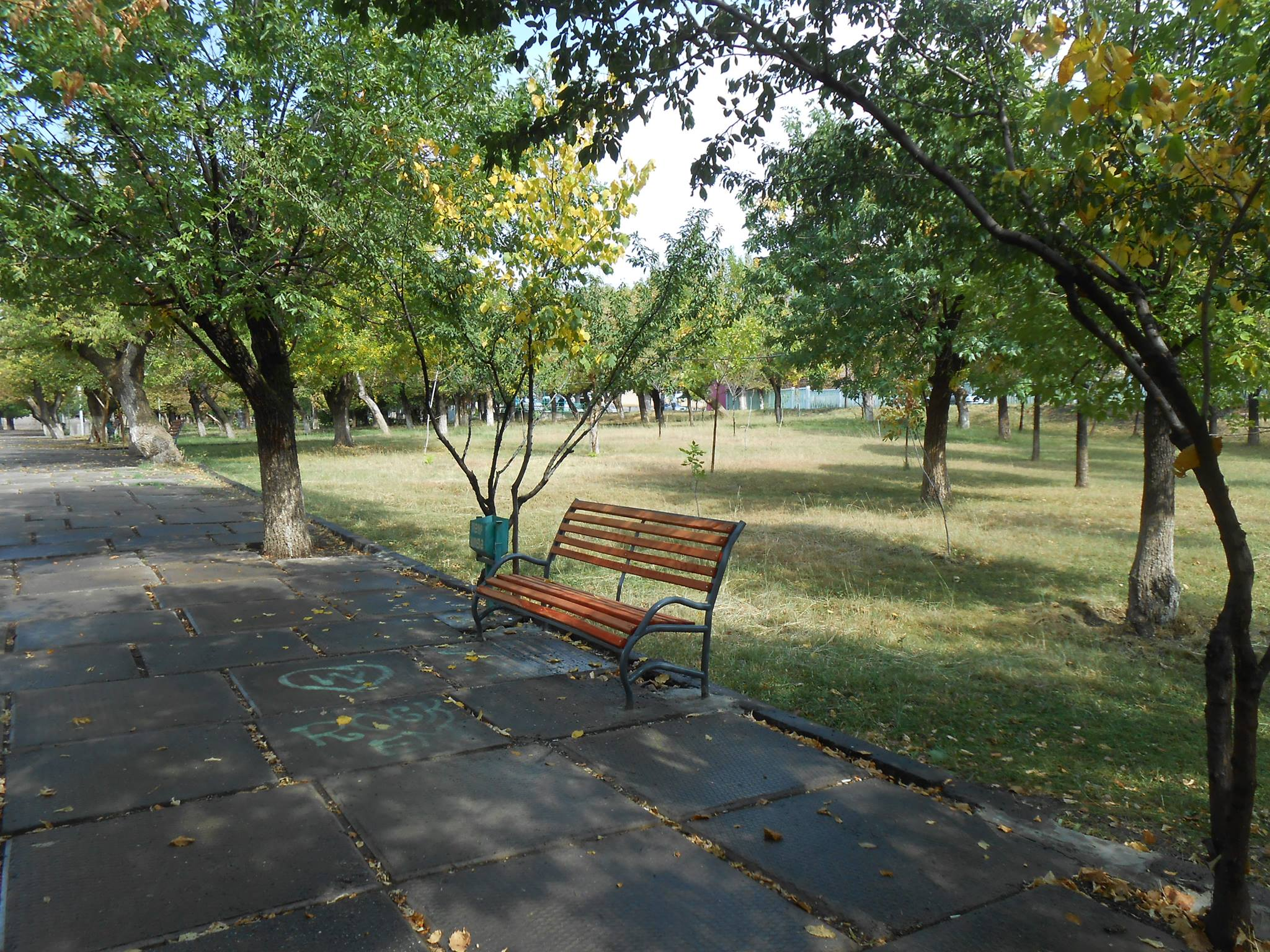
Nubarashen Central Park

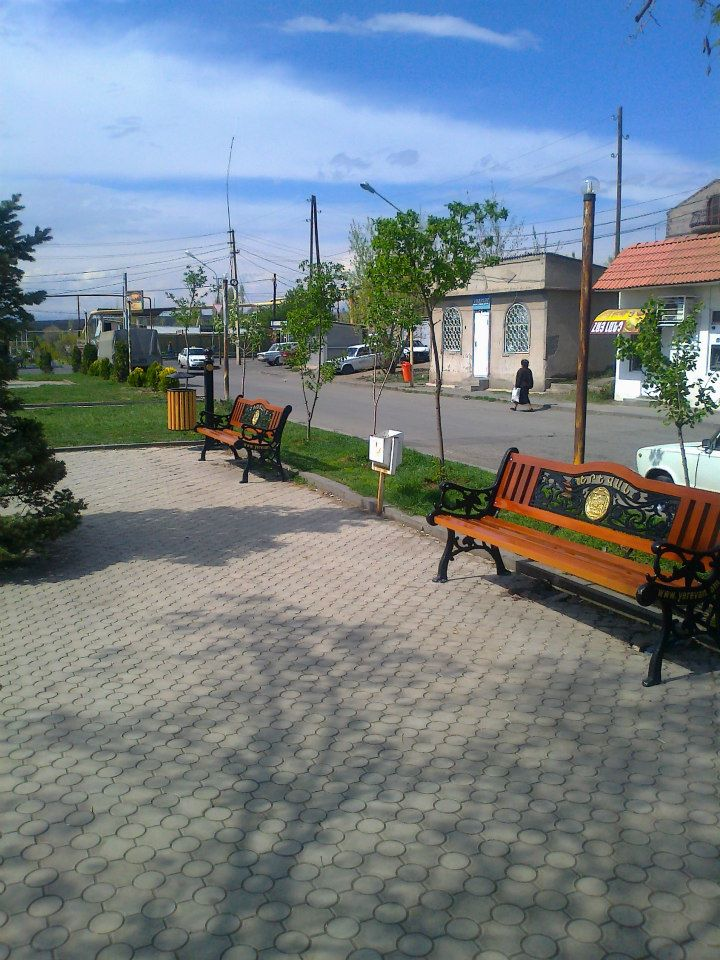
Nubar Nubarian Park

== Shengavit District ==
- Komitas Park
- Artur Karapetyan Park
- Movses Gorgisyan Park
- Shoghakat Park
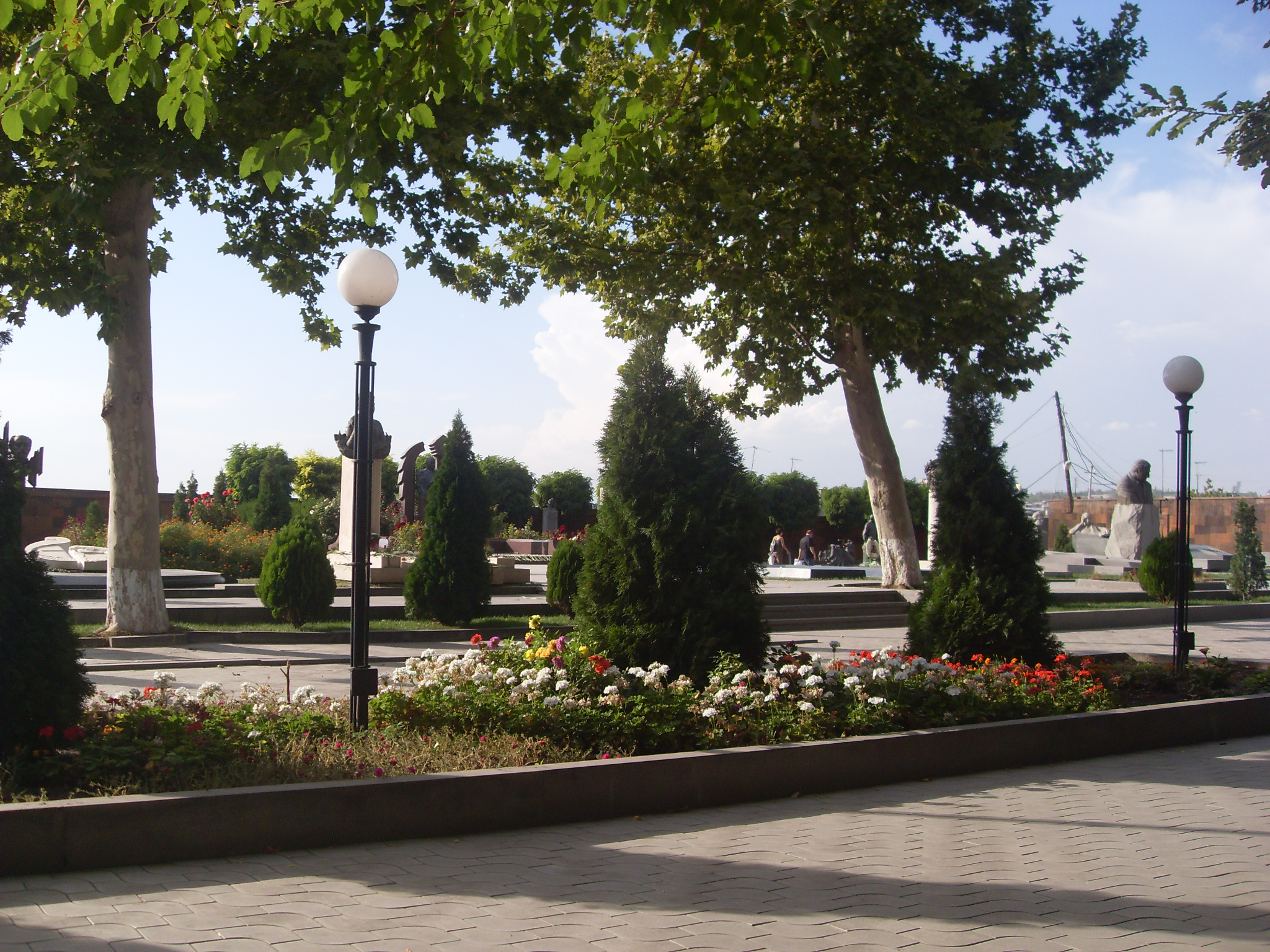
Komitas Park

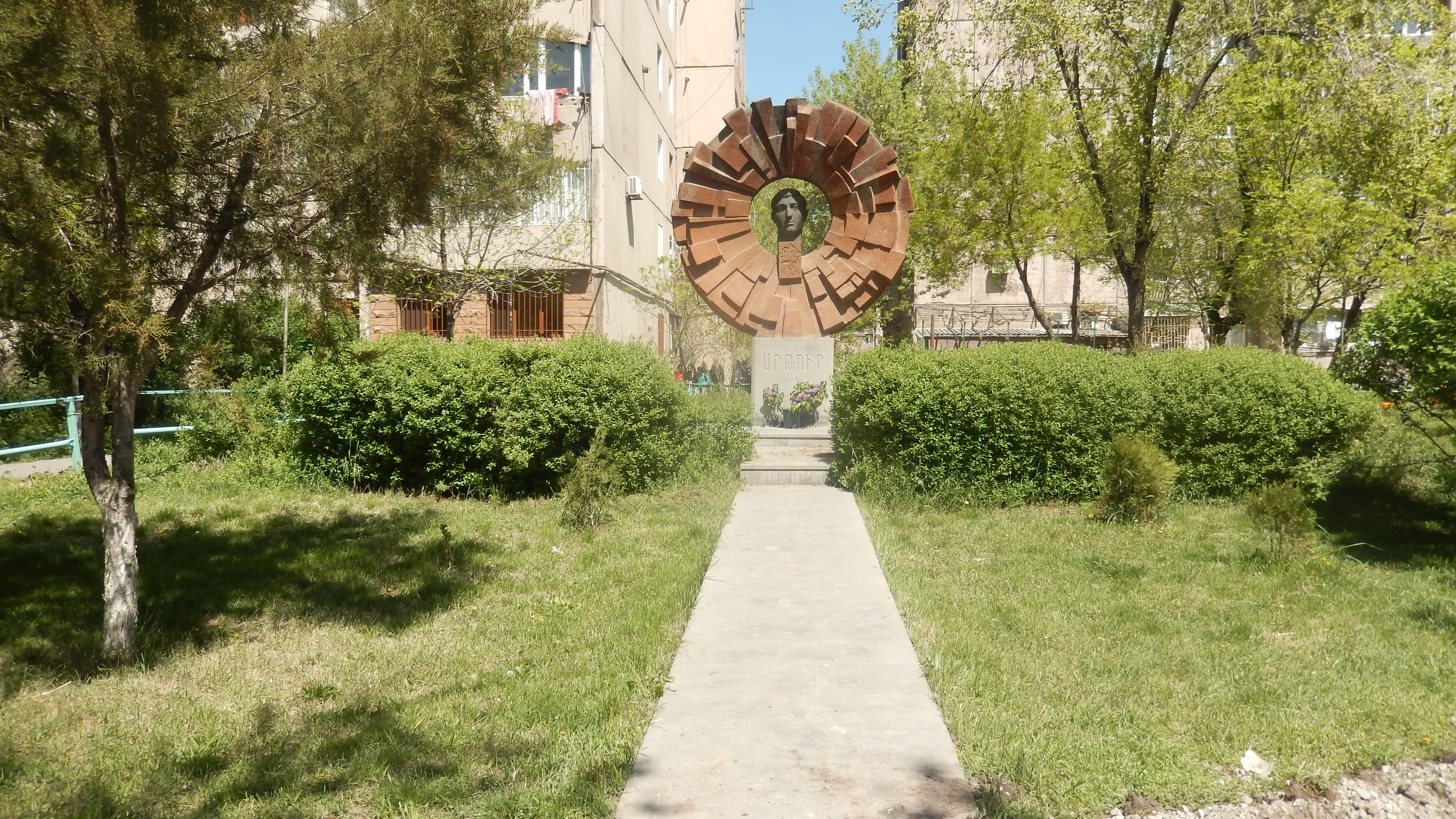
Artur Karapetyan Park
