= Abdelhamid Temmar =

Algerian politician (born 1938)

Abdelhamid Temmar (born October 24, 1938) is an Algerian politician. He was former minister of Investment in the government of Abdelaziz Belkhadem. Since June 2008, he has been Minister of Industry and Investment Promotion under the government of Prime Minister Ahmed Ouyahia.
