= Ja'far 'Abd Al-Hamid =

Iraqi British filmmaker

Ja'far 'Abd Al-Hamid is an Iraqi British filmmaker of "Mesocafe".

Born in Iraq, Ja'far and his family moved to other parts of the Arab world before settling in London in the mid-1980s.

While studying social sciences at the University of London, Ja'far began to assist in independent TV and radio productions in London. After attending courses in film production at London's Lux Centre, Hoxton, he began to write film criticism for the Arabic daily Al-Hayat newspaper, and later for the Paris-based Cahiers du cinéma magazine.

After completing an MA in Film Studies, he worked on a PhD thesis on film adaptations.

His credits include organizing film festivals within London and the Persian Gulf, most notably, programming assistant at the Raindance Film Festival in 2006.

== Filmography ==
- 2009 - Mesocafe
- 2005 - Eyes Wide Open
- 2001 - A Two Hour Delay
- 1991 - Test Drive
