= Deaths in November 1993 =

The following is a list of notable deaths in November 1993.

Entries for each day are listed alphabetically by surname. A typical entry lists information in the following sequence:

- Name, age, country of citizenship at birth, subsequent country of citizenship (if applicable), reason for notability, cause of death (if known), and reference.

== November 1993 ==
=== 1 ===
- Maeve Brennan, 76, Irish short story writer and journalist.
- Freda Corbet, 92, British politician.
- Georges Dancigers, 85, Russian-French film producer.
- Naina Devi, 76, Indian vocalist of Hindustani classical music.
- Clément Dupont, 94, French Olympic rugby player (1924).
- Pinkie George, 88, American professional wrestling promoter and boxer.
- Mervyn Jayathunga, 53, Sri Lankan actor.
- Loelia Lindsay, 91, British peeress and magazine editor.
- Severo Ochoa, 88, Spanish physician, biochemist, and Nobel Prize laureate.
- George A. Sheehan, 74, American physician and sports writer, prostate cancer.
- A. N. Sherwin-White, 82, British ancient historian and academic.
- Frank Sundström, 81, Swedish actor.
- Sir Arthur Ward, 87, New Zealand dairy researcher and university administrator.
- Salgado Zenha, 70, Portuguese lawyer and politician.

=== 2 ===
- Raymond Distave, 79, Belgian Olympic field hockey player (1936).
- Oswald Junkes, 72, German Olympic weightlifter (1952).
- Đuro Kurepa, 86, Yugoslav mathematician.
- Butch Nieman, 75, American Major League Baseball player (Boston Braves).
- Miguel Vasconcelos, 83, Mexican Olympic middle-distance runner (1932).
- Fred Williams, 80, American baseball player (Cleveland Indians).
- Jean-Claude Wuillemin, 50, French Olympic cyclist (1964).

=== 3 ===
- Richard Bayha, 64, German politician member of the Bundestag.
- H. G. Callan, 76, English zoologist and cytologist.
- Aidan Crawley, 85, British journalist, television executive, and politician.
- Bernard Martin Decker, 89, American district judge (United States District Court for the Northern District of Illinois).
- Duncan Gibbins, 41, British film and music video director, and screenwriter, burns.
- Doug Gibson, 63, Canadian Olympic swimmer (1948).
- Arnold Hamer, 76, English cricket player.
- William Lanteau, 70, American actor (Newhart, On Golden Pond, From Noon till Three).
- John Lupton, 65, American actor (Broken Arrow, Days of Our Lives, Julius Caesar).
- Redmond Phillips, 81, New Zealand actor (Tom Jones, A Night to Remember, Spyforce).
- Leon Theremin, 97, Russian and Soviet inventor.
- Henri Thomas, 80, French writer and poet.
- Vuko Vukadinović, 56, Yugoslav and Montenegrin communist.

=== 4 ===
- Daniel Barrow, 84, American rower and Olympian (1936).
- Jackie Callura, 76, Canadian featherweight boxer and Olympian (1932).
- Cem Ersever, 43, Turkish Army officer, murdered.
- Joe Hogan, 83, Australian rules footballer.
- Allan Hoover, 86, British-American mining engineer, rancher, and financier.
- Ely Landau, 73, American film producer and executive, stroke.
- Nerina Montagnani, 96, Italian actress, pneumonia.
- Seongcheol, 81, Korean Buddhist monk.
- Thomas Glynn Walker, 93, American district judge (United States District Court for the District of New Jersey).
- Cliff Young, 29, American baseball player (California Angels, Cleveland Indians), traffic accident.

=== 5 ===
- Basuki Abdullah, 78, Indonesian painter, beaten to death.
- Michael Bilton, 73, English actor.
- Kevin Clarke, 61, Australian rules footballer.
- Mario Cecchi Gori, 73, Italian film producer and businessman.
- Bertil Lundman, 94, Swedish anthropologist.
- Tadeusz Pankiewicz, 84, Polish pharmacist and resistance member during World War II.
- Arthur Rowe, 87, English football player and manager.

=== 6 ===
- Zena Abbott, 71, New Zealand weaver.
- Torsten Fenslau, 29, German disc jockey and music producer, traffic collision.
- Jack Hennemier, 80, American gridiron football coach and scout.
- Alexandru Piru, 76, Romanian literary critic and historian.
- Georges Reeb, 72, French mathematician.
- Ed Sadowski, 62, American Major League Baseball player (Boston Red Sox, Los Angeles Angels, Atlanta Braves), ALS.
- Joseph Serchuk, 74, Polish partisan during World War II.
- Ralph Randles Stewart, 103, American botanist.
- Michael Vernon, 61, Australian consumer rights activist, multiple myeloma.

=== 7 ===
- Charles Aidman, 68, American actor, cancer.
- Clemente Gaddi, 91, Italian prelate of the Catholic Church.
- Adelaide Hall, 92, American jazz singer and entertainer, pneumonia.
- Jon Hernandez, 24, Filipino actor, traffic collision.
- Mamadzhan Ismailov, 57, Soviet Olympic equestrian (1972).
- Nikolay Kostylev, 55, Russian weightlifter.
- Terris Moore, 85, American explorer and mountaineer, president of the University of Alaska, heart attack.
- Yuri Osmanov, 52, Soviet and Crimean Tatar civil rights activist, murdered.
- Walt Rankin, 74, American National Football League player (Chicago Cardinals, Card-Pitt).
- Tex Shirley, 75, American baseball player (Philadelphia Athletics, St. Louis Browns).
- Jack Martin Smith, 82, American art director (Cleopatra, Fantastic Voyage, Planet of the Apes), Oscar winner (1964, 1967, 1970).
- Andrey Tikhonov, 87, Soviet mathematician and geophysicist.

=== 8 ===
- Erik Beijar, 72, Finnish Olympic football player (1952).
- Dick Cathcart, 69, American dixieland trumpet player, cancer.
- Marcello Landi, 77, Italian painter and poet.
- Hank Leiber, 82, American baseball player.
- James Moffat, 71, Canadian-born British novelist.
- Francisco Zuluaga, 64, Colombian football player.

=== 9 ===
- Saqr III bin Sultan al-Qasimi, 68, Emirate of Sharjah ruler.
- Ross Andru, 66, American comic book artist (Wonder Woman, Spider-Man, The Punisher).
- Anatols Dinbergs, 82, Latvian diplomat.
- Leonard Farbstein, 91, American politician, member of the United States House of Representatives (1957-1971).
- Godfrey Lienhardt, 72, British anthropologist, pneumonia.
- Angus Maude, 81, British politician.
- Stanley Myers, 63, English film composer (The Deer Hunter, The Witches, Rosencrantz & Guildenstern Are Dead), cancer.
- Vishnudevananda Saraswati, 65, Indian yoga guru.
- Anne Smith, 52, British middle-distance runner and Olympian (1964), stroke.
- Gerald Thomas, 72, English film director (Carry On), heart attack.

=== 10 ===
- Artashes Arakelian, 84, Soviet and Armenian economist and academic.
- Alberto Breccia, 74, Uruguay-Argentine artist and cartoonist.
- Justin O'Byrne, 81, Australian politician.
- Paul Oßwald, 88, German football player and manager.
- Wensley Pithey, 79, South African actor (Oliver!, Coronation Street, Charlesworth).
- Harry L. Wolf, 85, American cinematographer (Columbo, Baretta, Little House on the Prairie).

=== 11 ===
- Dragomir Bojanić, 60, Serbian actor and humorist, liver cancer.
- Jean Chasson, 86, French Olympic wrestler (1932, 1936).
- Franco Evangelisti, 70, Italian politician.
- Mildred Fizzell, 78, Canadian athlete and Olympian (1932).
- Andrew Gregory Grutka, 84, American bishop of the Catholic Church.
- Erskine Hawkins, 79, American trumpeter and big band leader.
- Robert E. Hogaboom, 90, United States Marine Corps four-star general.
- Warren Leroy Jones, 98, American circuit judge.
- Osman Sabri, 88, Kurdish poet, writer and journalist.
- Franco Sassi, 81, Italian painter, printmaker and engraver.
- John Shirk, 76, American football player (Chicago Cardinals).
- John Stanley, 79, American cartoonist and comic book writer (Little Lulu)

=== 12 ===
- Arthur Clements, 72, Australian rules footballer.
- Bill Dickey, 86, American Hall of Fame baseball player (New York Yankees) and manager.
- Keith Flowers, 63, American gridiron football player (Detroit Lions).
- H. R. Haldeman, 67, American political aide and White House Chief of Staff, stomach cancer.
- Dria Paola, 83, Italian actress.
- William Haggin Perry, 82, American owner and breeder of thoroughbred racehorses.
- Ted Ringwood, 63, Australian experimental geophysicist and geochemist.
- LeGrant Scott, 83, American baseball player (Philadelphia Phillies).
- Anna Sten, 84, Ukrainian-American actress.
- Jill Tweedie, 57, British feminist, writer and broadcaster, ALS.

=== 13 ===
- Nick Brushfield, 87, Australian rules footballer.
- Bud Cook, 85, Canadian ice hockey player (Boston Bruins, Ottawa Senators, St. Louis Eagles).
- Jack Fulton, 90, American composer, trombonist, and vocalist.
- Gerhard Füssmann, 64, German Olympic rower (1952).
- Rufus R. Jones, 60, American professional wrestler, heart attack.
- George Taylor, 89, Scottish botanist, heart attack.
- G. K. Venkatesh, 66, Indian film score composer.

=== 14 ===
- András Béres, 69, Hungarian football player and manager.
- Manibhai Desai, 73, Indian economist and social activist.
- Vũ Hồng Khanh, 95, Vietnamese revolutionary.
- Sanzō Nosaka, 101, Japanese communist politician.
- Ya'akov Shimshon Shapira, 91, Israeli jurist and Socialist Zionist politician.
- Kim Won-yong, 71, South Korean archaeologist and art historian.

=== 15 ===
- Henry Dyck, 81, Canadian ice hockey player (New York Rangers).
- Jack Finch, 84, English football player.
- Yelena Gogoleva, 93, Soviet and Russian actress.
- Fred Hansen, 90, Australian rules footballer.
- Peter Kracke, 50, German footballer.
- Luciano Leggio, 68, Italian criminal and Sicilian Mafia leader, heart attack.
- Jimmy McAlinden, 75, Irish football player.
- Roy McDougall, 86, Australian rules footballer.
- Cvijetin Mijatović, 80, Yugoslav communist politician.
- Hal Mitchell, 63, American gridiron football player (New York Giants), cancer.
- Viola Myers, 66, Canadian sprinter and Olympian (1948).
- Virgil Vătășianu, 91, Romanian academic and art historian.
- Evelyn Venable, 80, American actress, cancer.
- Gladys Walton, 90, American silent film actress, cancer.

=== 16 ===
- Yves Brainville, 79, French actor.
- Tomàs Garcés, 92, Spanish lawyer and poet.
- Lorenzo Hierrezuelo, 86, Cuban trova singer, guitarist, and composer.
- João Martins, 66, Portuguese footballer.
- Frank Mockler, 84, American attorney and politician.
- Lucia Popp, 54, Slovak operatic soprano, brain cancer.
- Ken Renard, 87, American actor (True Grit, Something of Value, Lydia Bailey).
- Achille Zavatta, 78, French clown, artist and circus operator, suicide.

=== 17 ===
- Amy Jagger, 85, British Olympic artistic gymnast (1928).
- Gérard D. Levesque, 67, Canadian politician and Cabinet minister.
- Giorgos Mitsakis, 72, Greek folk composer and lyricist.
- Kiyoshi Nishimura, 61, Japanese filmmaker, suicide.
- Walter C. Ploeser, 86, American ambassador and politician, member of the United States House of Representatives (1941-1949).
- Teddy Powell, 88, American jazz musician and band leader.
- Gordon Richards, 60, Welsh football player.

=== 18 ===
- Fritz Feld, 93, German-American film actor.
- Arvid Fladmoe, 78, Norwegian composer and conductor.
- Rudolph Matt, 84, Austrian alpine skier and world champion.
- Branko Radović, 59, Yugoslav basketball player and coach.

=== 19 ===
- Kenneth Burke, 96, American literary theorist and author, heart attack.
- Carlo Da Prà, 62, Italian Olympic bobsledder (1956).
- Leonid Gaidai, 70, Soviet and Russian comedy film director, pulmonary embolism.
- Dorothy Revier, 89, American actress.
- Léon Roller, 65, Luxembourgian Olympic boxer (1948).
- Sir John Stallworthy, 87, New Zealand-born British obstetrician and professor.
- Norman Tindale, 93, Australian anthropologist, archaeologist, entomologist and ethnologist.

=== 20 ===
- Emile Ardolino, 50, American film director, choreographer, and producer, AIDS-related complications.
- Frederick Barton, 93, British Olympic pentathlete (1924).
- Heather Farr, 28, American professional golfer, cancer.
- Christopher Frank, 50, British-French writer, screenwriter, and film director, heart attack.
- Eve van Grafhorst, 11, first Australian child to be infected with HIV via a blood transfusion.
- Paul Guiragossian, 66, Armenian Lebanese painter.
- Willi Rutz, 86, German football player and manager.

=== 21 ===
- Bill Bixby, 59, American actor (The Incredible Hulk, My Favorite Martian, The Courtship of Eddie's Father), prostate cancer.
- Margaret Boyd, 80, English lacrosse player and schoolteacher.
- Masaru Furukawa, 57, Japanese swimmer and Olympic champion (1956).
- Fernand Picard, 87, French automotive engineer.
- Stéphane Proulx, 27, Canadian racing driver, AIDS-related complications.
- Bruno Rossi, 88, Italian experimental physicist.
- Richard Wordsworth, 78, English actor.

=== 22 ===
- P. A. Backer, 53, Indian Malayalam film director.
- William Brinkley, 76, American writer and journalist, suicide.
- Anthony Burgess, 76, English writer (A Clockwork Orange) and composer, lung cancer.
- Alois De Hertog, 66, Belgian racing cyclist.
- Reuben Efron, Lithuanian-American CIA officer.
- Alexander Langmuir, 83, American epidemiologist.
- Lee Loy Seng, 72, Malaysian businessman.
- Bill Laughlin, 77, American basketball player.
- Tatiana Nikolayeva, 69, Soviet and Russian pianist and composer, stroke.
- Harold Powell, 78, Australian rules footballer.
- Raymond Steele, 76, Australian rules footballer.
- James Stern, 88, Anglo-Irish writer of short stories and non-fiction.
- Elizabeth Threatt, 67, American model and actress.
- Ernst von Klipstein, 85, German actor.
- Tommy Wells, 82, Australian rules footballer.
- Joseph Yodoyman, 43, Chadian politician and civil servant.

=== 23 ===
- William Holmes Borders, 88, American pastor and civil rights activist.
- Grey Clarke, 81, American Major League Baseball player (Chicago White Sox).
- Pierre Ferri, 89, French stockbroker and politician.
- Margit Kalocsai, 83, Hungarian gymnast and Olympian (1936).
- Jack Symons, 81, Australian rules footballer.

=== 24 ===
- John Blythe, 72, English actor.
- Albert Collins, 61, American electric blues guitarist and singer, lung cancer.
- László Fenyvesi, 85, Hungarian football player and manager.
- Grès, 89, French couturier and costume designer.
- Janusz Komorowski, 88, Polish Olympic equestrian (1936).
- Gene Malinowski, 70, American football player.
- Emma McCune, 29, British foreign aid worker, traffic collision.
- Tom Scott, 85, American college basketball coach.
- Jan Theron, 63, South African Olympic wrestler (1952, 1956).
- William I. S. Thompson, 57, American politician, member of the Mississippi House of Representatives (1964-1968), plane crash.
- Zhou Peiyuan, 91, Chinese theoretical physicist and politician.

=== 25 ===
- Hervé Bromberger, 75, French film director and screenwriter.
- Juan Carlos Castillo, 29, Colombian racing cyclist, shot.
- Roman Durniok, 65, Polish football player and later manager.
- Mihály Esztergomi, 81, Hungarian Olympic long-distance runner (1952).
- Carl Lorenz, 79, German Olympic cyclist (1936).
- Claudia McNeil, 76, American actress (A Raisin in the Sun), diabetes.
- Louis Leo Snyder, 86, American scholar.
- Larry Uttal, 71, American music executive, AIDS.
- Burgess Whitehead, 83, American Major League Baseball player (St. Louis Cardinals, New York Giants, Pittsburgh Pirates).

=== 26 ===
- Erwin Gillmeister, 86, German sprinter and Olympian (1936).
- César Guerra-Peixe, 79, Brazilian violinist, composer, and conductor.
- Jarl Hjalmarson, 89, Swedish politician.
- Dirk Albert Hooijer, 74, Dutch paleontologist.
- Guido Masetti, 86, Italian football goalkeeper and manager.
- Ali Mohsen, 53, Yemeni football player.
- Grande Otelo, 78, Brazilian actor, comedian, singer, and composer, cardiovascular disease.
- Saly Ruth Ramler, 99, Czech-American mathematician.
- Bernardo Segall, 82, Brazilian-American composer and concert pianist.

=== 27 ===
- Edy Baumann, 79, Swiss Olympic cyclist (1936).
- James Gareth Endicott, 94, Canadian christian minister, missionary, and socialist.
- Jim Hayes, 80, American baseball player (Washington Senators).
- Jerry Hunt, 49, American composer, suicide.
- Einar Landvik, 95, Norwegian Nordic skier and Olympian (1924).
- Thaddeus Mann, 84, Polish biochemist.
- Everett C. Olson, 83, American zoologist, paleontologist, and geologist.
- William J. Trent, 83, American economist, executive director of United Negro College Fund.

=== 28 ===
- Monroe Abbey, 89, Canadian lawyer and civic leader.
- Eilif Armand, 72, Norwegian actor.
- Pery Broad, 72, Brazilian Schutzstaffel non-commissioned officer.
- Kenneth Connor, 75, English stage, film and broadcasting actor, cancer.
- Tommie Connor, 89, English lyricist and songwriter.
- Francis L. Dale, 72, American businessman and Major League Baseball executive.
- Jerry Edmonton, 47, American musician, traffic collision.
- June Gittelson, 83, American film actress.
- Robert Hawkins, 39, American basketball player (Golden State Warriors, New York/New Jersey Nets, Detroit Pistons), shot.
- Rudolf Keller, 76, German chess master.
- Joe Kelly, 80, Irish racing driver.
- Jim Leonard, 83, American National Football League player (Philadelphia Eagles) and coach (Pittsburgh Steelers).
- Garry Moore, 78, American entertainer, comedian, and game show host, pulmonary emphysema.
- Huang Oudong, 88, Chinese politician.
- George Piktuzis, 61, American baseball player (Chicago Cubs).
- John Rokisky, 78, American gridiron football player.
- Marian Dale Scott, 87, Canadian painter.
- Camillo Togni, 71, Italian composer, teacher, and pianist.
- Bruce Turner, 71, English jazz saxophonist, clarinetist, and bandleader.

=== 29 ===
- Arnold Boghaert, 73, Belgian Roman Catholic bishop.
- Alan Clare, 72, British jazz pianist and composer.
- Pyotr Grushin, 87, Soviet rocket scientist and academic.
- Sir Jack Longland, 88, English broadcaster, educator and mountain climber.
- Marco Novaro, 81, Italian Olympic sailor (1960).
- J. R. D. Tata, 89, Indian aviator, industrialist, and entrepreneur.
- Thomas W. Whitaker, 89, American botanist and horticulturist.

=== 30 ===
- David Houston, 57, American country music singer, stroke.
- Wacław Jędrzejewicz, 100, Polish Army officer, diplomat, and politician.
- Sebastian Kappen, 69, Indian Jesuit priest and theologian.
- Hirubhai M. Patel, 89, Indian civil servant and politician.
- Wogan Philipps, 2nd Baron Milford, 91, British communist politician and member of the House of Lords.
- Tom Scannell, 68, Irish football player.
- Bob Woolf, 65, American sports agent.
