= Cycling at the 1936 Summer Olympics =

Cycling at the Games of the XI Olympiad
- Venues: Avus motor road Berliner Sport-Club Stadium; Deutschlandhalle
- Date: 6 –8 August 1936
- Competitors: 175 from 30 nations

The cycling competition at the 1936 Summer Olympics consisted of two road cycling events and four track cycling events, all for men only.

== Medal summary ==
=== Road cycling ===
Games	Gold	Silver	Bronze
Road race, Individual	Robert Charpentier; France	Guy Lapébie; France	Ernst Nievergelt; Switzerland
Road race, Team	France; Robert Charpentier; Robert Dorgebray; Guy Lapébie	Switzerland; Edgar Buchwalder; Ernst Nievergelt; Kurt Ott	Belgium; Auguste Garrebeek; Armand Putzeys; François Vandermotte

=== Track cycling ===
Games	Gold	Silver	Bronze
Pursuit, team	France; Roger-Jean Le Nizerhy; Robert Charpentier; Jean Goujon; Guy Lapébie	Italy; Severino Rigoni; Bianco Bianchi; Mario Gentili; Armando Latini	Great Britain; Ernie Mills; Harry Hill; Ernest Johnson; Charles King
Sprint	Toni Merkens; Germany	Arie van Vliet; Netherlands	Louis Chaillot; France
Tandem	Ernst Ihbe and Carl Lorenz; Germany	Bernhard Leene and Hendrik Ooms; Netherlands	Pierre Georget and Georges Maton; France
1000m time trial	Arie van Vliet; Netherlands	Pierre Georget; France	Rudolf Karsch; Germany

== Participating nations ==
175 cyclists from 30 nations competed.

- Australia (3)
- Austria (10)
- Belgium (8)
- Brazil (3)
- Bulgaria (10)
- Canada (6)
- Chile (4)
- Republic of China (1)
- Czechoslovakia (4)
- Denmark (11)

- Finland (2)
- France (8)
- Germany (12)
- Great Britain (11)
- Hungary (8)
- Italy (11)
- Latvia (4)
- Liechtenstein (1)
- Luxembourg (4)
- Netherlands (11)

- New Zealand (1)
- Norway (2)
- Peru (4)
- Poland (4)
- South Africa (2)
- Sweden (5)
- Switzerland (11)
- Turkey (4)
- United States (6)
- Yugoslavia (4)

== Medal table ==
Rank	Nation	Gold	Silver	Bronze	Total
1	France	3	2	2	7
2	Germany	2	0	1	3
3	Netherlands	1	2	0	3
4	Switzerland	0	1	1	2
5	Italy	0	1	0	1
6	Belgium	0	0	1	1
6	Great Britain	0	0	1	1
Totals (7 entries)		6	6	6	18
