= List of Dutch Olympic cyclists =

Netherlands at the Olympics
- Flag of the Netherlands
- IOC code: NED
- NOC: Dutch Olympic Committee*; Dutch Sports Federation
- Website: www.nocnsf.nl (in Dutch)
- Medals: Gold 0 Silver 0 Bronze 0 Total 0

Summer appearances
- 1900; 1904; 1908; 1912; 1920; 1924; 1928; 1932; 1936; 1948; 1952; 1956; 1960; 1964; 1968; 1972; 1976; 1980; 1984; 1988; 1992; 1996; 2000; 2004; 2008; 2012; 2016; 2020; 2024

Winter appearances
- 1928; 1932; 1936; 1948; 1952; 1956; 1960; 1964; 1968; 1972; 1976; 1980; 1984; 1988; 1992; 1994; 1998; 2002; 2006; 2010; 2014; 2018; 2022; 2026; 2030

Other related appearances
- 1906 Intercalated Games

This is a list of all Dutch cyclists who competed at the Summer Olympics. As of 2012 events in four cycling disciplines (BMX, mountain biking, road cycling, and track cycling) have been contested at the Summer Olympics. Dutch cyclist did not compete at the 1896, 1900 Summer Olympics, 1904 Summer Olympics and 1912 Summer Olympics and boycotted the 1956 Summer Olympics.

== Dutch Olympic cyclists ==
Cyclist	Year	Discipline	Event
Thijs Al	2004 Summer Olympics	Mountain biking	Men's cross-country
Johan Alberts	1984 Summer Olympics	Road cycling	Men's team time trial
Dylan van Baarle	2020 Summer Olympics	Road cycling	Men's road race
Dylan van Baarle	2024 Summer Olympics	Road cycling	Men's road race
Mario van Baarle	1988 Summer Olympics	Track cycling	Men's team pursuit
Judy Baauw	2020 Summer Olympics	BMX	Women's BMX
Jarich Bakker	1996 Summer Olympics	Track cycling	Men's team pursuit
Maarten den Bakker	1988 Summer Olympics	Road cycling	Men's team time trial
Klaas Balk	1968 Summer Olympics	Track cycling	Men's team pursuit
Klaas Balk	1972 Summer Olympics	Track cycling	Men's sprint
Klaas Balk	1972 Summer Olympics	Track cycling	Men's tandem
Pieter Beets	1920 Summer Olympics	Track cycling	Men's tandem
Pieter Beets	1920 Summer Olympics	Track cycling	Men's team pursuit
Chantal Beltman	2000 Summer Olympics	Road cycling	Women's road race
Chantal Beltman	2008 Summer Olympics	Road cycling	Women's road race
Merle van Benthem	2016 Summer Olympics	BMX	Women's BMX
Roy van den Berg	2020 Summer Olympics	Track cycling	Men's team sprint
Marcel Beumer	1988 Summer Olympics	Track cycling	Men's team pursuit
Guus Bierings	1980 Summer Olympics	Road cycling	Men's team time trial
Raymon van der Biezen	2008 Summer Olympics	BMX	Men's BMX
Raymon van der Biezen	2012 Summer Olympics	BMX	Men's BMX
Theo Blankenauw	1948 Summer Olympics	Track cycling	Men's 1000m time trial
Theo Blankenauw	1948 Summer Olympics	Track cycling	Men's team pursuit
Léon van Bon	1992 Summer Olympics	Track cycling	Men's points race
Léon van Bon	2000 Summer Olympics	Road cycling	Men's road race
Michael Boogerd	2004 Summer Olympics	Road cycling	Men's road race
Lars Boom	2012 Summer Olympics	Road cycling	Men's road race
Lars Boom	2012 Summer Olympics	Road cycling	Men's time trial
Tjabel Boonstra	1920 Summer Olympics	Track cycling	Men's sprint
Tjabel Boonstra	1920 Summer Olympics	Track cycling	Men's tandem
Jan Bos	2004 Summer Olympics	Track cycling	Men's team sprint
Theo Bos	2004 Summer Olympics	Track cycling	Men's sprint
Theo Bos	2004 Summer Olympics	Track cycling	Men's team sprint
Theo Bos	2004 Summer Olympics	Track cycling	Men's time trial
Theo Bos	2004 Summer Olympics	Track cycling	Men's keirin
Theo Bos	2008 Summer Olympics	Track cycling	Men's sprint
Theo Bos	2008 Summer Olympics	Track cycling	Men's keirin
Theo Bos	2016 Summer Olympics	Track cycling	Men's sprint
Theo Bos	2016 Summer Olympics	Track cycling	Men's team sprint
Theo Bos	2016 Summer Olympics	Track cycling	Men's keirin
Gerard Bosch van Drakestein	1908 Summer Olympics	Track cycling	Men's 660 yards
Gerard Bosch van Drakestein	1908 Summer Olympics	Track cycling	Men's 5000 metres
Gerard Bosch van Drakestein	1908 Summer Olympics	Track cycling	Men's 20 kilometres
Gerard Bosch van Drakestein	1908 Summer Olympics	Track cycling	Men's 100 kilometres
Gerard Bosch van Drakestein	1908 Summer Olympics	Track cycling	Men's sprint
Gerard Bosch van Drakestein	1908 Summer Olympics	Track cycling	Men's team pursuit
Gerard Bosch van Drakestein	1924 Summer Olympics	Track cycling	Men's tandem
Gerard Bosch van Drakestein	1924 Summer Olympics	Track cycling	Men's team pursuit
Gerard Bosch van Drakestein	1928 Summer Olympics	Track cycling	Men's team pursuit
Gerard Bosch van Drakestein	1928 Summer Olympics	Track cycling	Men's 1000m time trial
John den Braber	1992 Summer Olympics	Track cycling	Men's team time trial
John den Braber	2000 Summer Olympics	Track cycling	Men's team pursuit
Janus Braspennincx	1928 Summer Olympics	Road cycling	Men's individual road race
Janus Braspennincx	1928 Summer Olympics	Road cycling	Men's team road race
Janus Braspennincx	1928 Summer Olympics	Track cycling	Men's team pursuit
Shanne Braspennincx	2020 Summer Olympics	Track cycling	Women's sprint
Shanne Braspennincx	2020 Summer Olympics	Track cycling	Women's team sprint
Shanne Braspennincx	2020 Summer Olympics	Track cycling	Women's keirin
Anna van der Breggen	2016 Summer Olympics	Road cycling	Women's road race
Anna van der Breggen	2016 Summer Olympics	Road cycling	Women's time trial
Anna van der Breggen	2020 Summer Olympics	Road cycling	Women's road race
Anna van der Breggen	2020 Summer Olympics	Road cycling	Women's time trial
Bart Brentjes	1996 Summer Olympics	Mountain biking	Men's cross-country
Bart Brentjes	2000 Summer Olympics	Mountain biking	Men's cross-country
Bart Brentjes	2004 Summer Olympics	Mountain biking	Men's cross-country
Bart Brentjes	2008 Summer Olympics	Mountain biking	Men's cross-country
Erik Breukink	1984 Summer Olympics	Road cycling	Men's team time trial
Erik Breukink	1996 Summer Olympics	Road cycling	Men's road race
Erik Breukink	1996 Summer Olympics	Road cycling	Men's time trial
Gerben Broeren	1992 Summer Olympics	Track cycling	Men's team pursuit
Yvonne Brunen	1996 Summer Olympics	Road cycling	Women's road race
Yvonne Brunen	1996 Summer Olympics	Road cycling	Women's time trial
Klaas Buchly	1948 Summer Olympics	Track cycling	Men's tandem
Matthijs Büchli	2016 Summer Olympics	Track cycling	Men's team sprint
Matthijs Büchli	2016 Summer Olympics	Track cycling	Men's keirin
Matthijs Büchli	2020 Summer Olympics	Track cycling	Men's team sprint
Matthijs Büchli	2020 Summer Olympics	Track cycling	Men's keirin
Leen Buis	1928 Summer Olympics	Road cycling	Men's individual road race
Leen Buis	1928 Summer Olympics	Road cycling	Men's team road race
Joost van der Burg	2016 Summer Olympics	Track cycling	Men's team pursuit
Erik Cent	1988 Summer Olympics	Track cycling	Men's team pursuit
Erik Cent	1988 Summer Olympics	Track cycling	Men's individual pursuit
Erik Cent	1992 Summer Olympics	Track cycling	Men's team pursuit
Stef Clement	2008 Summer Olympics	Road cycling	Men's road race
Stef Clement	2008 Summer Olympics	Road cycling	Men's time trial
Rob Compas	1992 Summer Olympics	Road cycling	Men's road race
Tom Cordes	1988 Summer Olympics	Road cycling	Men's team time trial
Tom Cordes	1988 Summer Olympics	Road cycling	Men's road race
Henk Cornelisse	1964 Summer Olympics	Track cycling	Men's team pursuit
Hans Daams	1984 Summer Olympics	Road cycling	Men's road race
Laurens ten Dam	2008 Summer Olympics	Road cycling	Men's road race
Georgius Damen	1908 Summer Olympics	Track cycling	Men's 660 yards
Georgius Damen	1908 Summer Olympics	Track cycling	Men's 5000 metres
Georgius Damen	1908 Summer Olympics	Track cycling	Men's 20 kilometres
Georgius Damen	1908 Summer Olympics	Track cycling	Men's 100 kilometres
Erik Dekker	1992 Summer Olympics	Road cycling	Men's road race
Erik Dekker	1996 Summer Olympics	Road cycling	Men's road race
Erik Dekker	1996 Summer Olympics	Road cycling	Men's time trial
Erik Dekker	2000 Summer Olympics	Road cycling	Men's time trial
Erik Dekker	2000 Summer Olympics	Road cycling	Men's road race
Erik Dekker	2004 Summer Olympics	Road cycling	Men's road race
Thomas Dekker	2004 Summer Olympics	Road cycling	Men's time trial
Ad Dekkers	1972 Summer Olympics	Track cycling	Men's team pursuit
Thierry Detant	1988 Summer Olympics	Track cycling	Men's 1000m time trial
Daan van Dijk	1928 Summer Olympics	Track cycling	Men's tandem
Ellen van Dijk	2012 Summer Olympics	Road cycling	Women's road race
Ellen van Dijk	2012 Summer Olympics	Road cycling	Women's time trial
Ellen van Dijk	2012 Summer Olympics	Track cycling	Women's team pursuit
Ellen van Dijk	2016 Summer Olympics	Road cycling	Women's road race
Ellen van Dijk	2016 Summer Olympics	Road cycling	Women's time trial
Ellen van Dijk	2024 Summer Olympics	Road cycling	Women's road race
Ellen van Dijk	2024 Summer Olympics	Road cycling	Women's time trial
Evert Dolman	1964 Summer Olympics	Road cycling	Men's team time trial
Bas van Dooren	2000 Summer Olympics	Mountain biking	Men's cross-country
Peter van Doorn	1972 Summer Olympics	Track cycling	Men's 1000m time trial
Peter van Doorn	1972 Summer Olympics	Track cycling	Men's tandem
Peter van Doorn	1972 Summer Olympics	Track cycling	Men's sprint
Corine Dorland	2000 Summer Olympics	Mountain biking	Women's cross-country
Maarten Ducrot	1984 Summer Olympics	Road cycling	Men's team time trial
Ben Duijker	1928 Summer Olympics	Road cycling	Men's individual road race
Ben Duijker	1928 Summer Olympics	Road cycling	Men's team road race
Tom Dumoulin	2016 Summer Olympics	Road cycling	Men's road race
Tom Dumoulin	2016 Summer Olympics	Road cycling	Men's time trial
Tom Dumoulin	2020 Summer Olympics	Road cycling	Men's road race
Tom Dumoulin	2020 Summer Olympics	Road cycling	Men's time trial
Derk-Jan van Egmond	1984 Summer Olympics	Track cycling	Men's points race
Jacobus van Egmond	1932 Summer Olympics	Track cycling	Men's sprint
Jacobus van Egmond	1932 Summer Olympics	Track cycling	Men's 1000m time trial
Jacobus van Egmond	1932 Summer Olympics	Track cycling	Men's tandem
Rafael Elshof	1984 Summer Olympics	Track cycling	Men's team pursuit
Henk Faanhof	1948 Summer Olympics	Road cycling	Men's road race
Henk Faanhof	1948 Summer Olympics	Road cycling	Men's team road race
Henk Faanhof	1948 Summer Olympics	Track cycling	Men's team pursuit
Nico van Gageldonk	1936 Summer Olympics	Road cycling	Men's individual road race
Nico van Gageldonk	1936 Summer Olympics	Road cycling	Men's team road race
Tinus van Gelder	1948 Summer Olympics	Track cycling	Men's tandem
Twan van Gendt	2012 Summer Olympics	BMX	Men's BMX
Twan van Gendt	2016 Summer Olympics	BMX	Men's BMX
Twan van Gendt	2020 Summer Olympics	BMX	Men's BMX
Antonie Gerrits	1908 Summer Olympics	Track cycling	Men's 660 yards
Antonie Gerrits	1908 Summer Olympics	Track cycling	Men's 5000 metres
Antonie Gerrits	1908 Summer Olympics	Track cycling	Men's sprint
Antonie Gerrits	1908 Summer Olympics	Track cycling	Men's team pursuit
Mees Gerritsen	1960 Summer Olympics	Track cycling	Men's tandem
Robert Gesink	2008 Summer Olympics	Road cycling	Men's road race
Robert Gesink	2008 Summer Olympics	Road cycling	Men's time trial
Robert Gesink	2012 Summer Olympics	Road cycling	Men's road race
Jelle van Gorkom	2012 Summer Olympics	BMX	Men's BMX
Jelle van Gorkom	2016 Summer Olympics	BMX	Men's BMX
Aad de Graaf	1960 Summer Olympics	Track cycling	Men's sprint
Aad de Graaf	1964 Summer Olympics	Track cycling	Men's sprint
Aad de Graaf	1964 Summer Olympics	Track cycling	Men's tandem
Evert Grift	1948 Summer Olympics	Road cycling	Men's road race
Evert Grift	1948 Summer Olympics	Road cycling	Men's team road race
Petra Grimbergen	1992 Summer Olympics	Road cycling	Women's road race
Tiemen Groen	1964 Summer Olympics	Track cycling	Men's individual pursuit
Richard Groenendaal	1992 Summer Olympics	Road cycling	Men's road race
Daan de Groot	1952 Summer Olympics	Track cycling	Men's team pursuit
Loes Gunnewijk	2012 Summer Olympics	Road cycling	Women's road race
Heleen Hage	1988 Summer Olympics	Road cycling	Women's road race
Dirk Jan van Hameren	1992 Summer Olympics	Track cycling	Men's 1000m time trial
Dirk Jan van Hameren	1992 Summer Olympics	Track cycling	Men's sprint
Dirk Jan van Hameren	1996 Summer Olympics	Track cycling	Men's 1000m time trial
Jack Hanegraaf	1980 Summer Olympics	Road cycling	Men's team time trial
Jack Hanegraaf	1980 Summer Olympics	Road cycling	Men's road race
Ingrid Haringa	1992 Summer Olympics	Track cycling	Women's sprint
Ingrid Haringa	1996 Summer Olympics	Road cycling	Women's road race
Ingrid Haringa	1996 Summer Olympics	Track cycling	Women's sprint
Ingrid Haringa	1996 Summer Olympics	Track cycling	Women's points race
Joop Harmans	1948 Summer Olympics	Track cycling	Men's team pursuit
Rob Harmeling	1988 Summer Olympics	Road cycling	Men's road race
Joris Harmsen	2020 Summer Olympics	BMX	Men's BMX
Arie Hassink	1976 Summer Olympics	Road cycling	Men's team time trial
Arie Hassink	1976 Summer Olympics	Road cycling	Men's road race
Yoeri Havik	2020 Summer Olympics	Road cycling	Men's road race
Yoeri Havik	2020 Summer Olympics	Track cycling	Men's madison
Cor Heeren	1924 Summer Olympics	Road cycling	Men's time trial
Cor Heeren	1924 Summer Olympics	Road cycling	Men's team time trial
Max van Heeswijk	2000 Summer Olympics	Road cycling	Men's road race
Max van Heeswijk	2004 Summer Olympics	Road cycling	Men's road race
Levi Heimans	2004 Summer Olympics	Track cycling	Men's individual pursuit
Levi Heimans	2004 Summer Olympics	Track cycling	Men's team pursuit
Levi Heimans	2008 Summer Olympics	Track cycling	Men's team pursuit
Levi Heimans	2012 Summer Olympics	Track cycling	Men's team pursuit
Fedor den Hertog	1968 Summer Olympics	Road cycling	Men's team time trial
Fedor den Hertog	1968 Summer Olympics	Track cycling	Men's individual pursuit
Fedor den Hertog	1972 Summer Olympics	Road cycling	Men's team time trial
Fedor den Hertog	1972 Summer Olympics	Road cycling	Men's road race
Yvonne Hijgenaar	2004 Summer Olympics	Track cycling	Women's sprint
Yvonne Hijgenaar	2004 Summer Olympics	Track cycling	Women's time trial
Yvonne Hijgenaar	2008 Summer Olympics	Track cycling	Women's sprint
Yvonne Hijgenaar	2012 Summer Olympics	Track cycling	Women's team sprint
Jan Hijzelendoorn	1948 Summer Olympics	Track cycling	Men's sprint
Jan Hijzelendoorn	1952 Summer Olympics	Track cycling	Men's 1000m time trial
Jan Hijzelendoorn	1952 Summer Olympics	Track cycling	Men's sprint
Aad van den Hoek	1972 Summer Olympics	Road cycling	Men's team time trial
Piet Hoekstra	1968 Summer Olympics	Track cycling	Men's team pursuit
Nils van 't Hoenderdaal	2016 Summer Olympics	Track cycling	Men's team sprint
Nils van 't Hoenderdaal	2016 Summer Olympics	Track cycling	Men's team pursuit
Tristan Hoffman	1996 Summer Olympics	Road cycling	Men's road race
Tristan Hoffman	2000 Summer Olympics	Road cycling	Men's road race
Arend van 't Hoft	1952 Summer Olympics	Road cycling	Men's road race
Arend van 't Hoft	1952 Summer Olympics	Road cycling	Men's team road race
Theo Hogervorst	1980 Summer Olympics	Road cycling	Men's team time trial
Jeffrey Hoogland	2016 Summer Olympics	Track cycling	Men's sprint
Jeffrey Hoogland	2016 Summer Olympics	Track cycling	Men's team sprint
Jeffrey Hoogland	2020 Summer Olympics	Track cycling	Men's sprint
Jeffrey Hoogland	2020 Summer Olympics	Track cycling	Men's team sprint
Daan Hoole	2024 Summer Olympics	Road cycling	Men's time trial
Daan Hoole	2024 Summer Olympics	Road cycling	Men's road race
Piet van der Horst	1928 Summer Olympics	Track cycling	Men's team pursuit
Rudi van Houts	2008 Summer Olympics	Mountain biking	Men's cross-country
Rudi van Houts	2012 Summer Olympics	Mountain biking	Men's cross-country
Rudi van Houts	2016 Summer Olympics	Mountain biking	Men's cross-country
Adrianus van Houwelingen	1976 Summer Olympics	Road cycling	Men's team time trial
René van Hove	1936 Summer Olympics	Road cycling	Men's individual road race
René van Hove	1936 Summer Olympics	Road cycling	Men's team road race
Jan Hugens	1960 Summer Olympics	Road cycling	Men's team time trial
Jan Hugens	1960 Summer Olympics	Road cycling	Men's road race
Jenning Huizenga	2008 Summer Olympics	Track cycling	Men's individual pursuit
Jenning Huizenga	2012 Summer Olympics	Track cycling	Men's team pursuit
Marco van der Hulst	1984 Summer Olympics	Track cycling	Men's team pursuit
Petrus Ikelaar	1920 Summer Olympics	Road cycling	Men's time trial
Petrus Ikelaar	1920 Summer Olympics	Road cycling	Men's team time trial
Petrus Ikelaar	1920 Summer Olympics	Track cycling	Men's sprint
Petrus Ikelaar	1920 Summer Olympics	Track cycling	Men's 50 kilometres
Petrus Ikelaar	1920 Summer Olympics	Track cycling	Men's team pursuit
Petrus Ikelaar	1920 Summer Olympics	Track cycling	Men's tandem
Philippus Innemee	1924 Summer Olympics	Road cycling	Men's time trial
Philippus Innemee	1924 Summer Olympics	Road cycling	Men's team time trial
Gert Jakobs	1984 Summer Olympics	Road cycling	Men's team time trial
Harrie Jansen	1968 Summer Olympics	Road cycling	Men's road race
Jan Jansen	1968 Summer Olympics	Track cycling	Men's sprint
Jan Jansen	1968 Summer Olympics	Track cycling	Men's tandem
Jan Janssen	1960 Summer Olympics	Road cycling	Men's road race
Nicolaas de Jong	1920 Summer Olympics	Road cycling	Men's time trial
Nicolaas de Jong	1920 Summer Olympics	Road cycling	Men's team time trial
Gerard Kamper	1972 Summer Olympics	Track cycling	Men's team pursuit
Willy Kanis	2008 Summer Olympics	Track cycling	Women's sprint
Willy Kanis	2012 Summer Olympics	Track cycling	Women's sprint
Willy Kanis	2012 Summer Olympics	Track cycling	Women's team sprint
Willy Kanis	2012 Summer Olympics	Track cycling	Women's keirin
Gerben Karstens	1964 Summer Olympics	Road cycling	Men's team time trial
Gerben Karstens	1964 Summer Olympics	Road cycling	Men's road race
Alphons van Katwijk	1976 Summer Olympics	Road cycling	Men's team time trial
Piet van Katwijk	1972 Summer Olympics	Road cycling	Men's road race
Wilco Kelderman	2020 Summer Olympics	Road cycling	Men's road race
Niek Kimmann	2016 Summer Olympics	BMX	Men's BMX
Niek Kimmann	2020 Summer Olympics	BMX	Men's BMX
Pieter Kloppenburg	1920 Summer Olympics	Road cycling	Men's time trial
Pieter Kloppenburg	1920 Summer Olympics	Road cycling	Men's team time trial
Lex van Kreuningen	1960 Summer Olympics	Road cycling	Men's team time trial
Lex van Kreuningen	1960 Summer Olympics	Road cycling	Men's road race
Hennie Kuiper	1972 Summer Olympics	Road cycling	Men's team time trial
Hennie Kuiper	1972 Summer Olympics	Road cycling	Men's road race
Anton Kuys	1928 Summer Olympics	Road cycling	Men's team road race
Pelle Kil	1992 Summer Olympics	Road cycling	Men's team time trial
Lieke Klaus	2008 Summer Olympics	BMX	Women's BMX
Servais Knaven	1992 Summer Olympics	Track cycling	Men's team pursuit
Servais Knaven	1992 Summer Olympics	Track cycling	Men's individual pursuit
Servais Knaven	2004 Summer Olympics	Road cycling	Men's road race
Monique Knol	1988 Summer Olympics	Road cycling	Women's road race
Monique Knol	1992 Summer Olympics	Road cycling	Women's road race
Vera Koedooder	2012 Summer Olympics	Track cycling	Women's team pursuit
Gerard Koel	1964 Summer Olympics	Track cycling	Men's team pursuit
Jaap ten Kortenaar	1992 Summer Olympics	Road cycling	Men's team time trial
Jan Krekels	1968 Summer Olympics	Road cycling	Men's team time trial
Jan Krekels	1968 Summer Olympics	Road cycling	Men's road race
Anton Krijgsman	1920 Summer Olympics	Track cycling	Men's 50 kilometres
Karsten Kroon	2004 Summer Olympics	Road cycling	Men's road race
Karsten Kroon	2008 Summer Olympics	Road cycling	Men's road race
Chris Kropman	1936 Summer Olympics	Track cycling	Men's team pursuit
Steven Kruijswijk	2016 Summer Olympics	Road cycling	Men's road race
Sebastian Langeveld	2012 Summer Olympics	Road cycling	Men's road race
Piet van der Lans	1960 Summer Olympics	Track cycling	Men's team pursuit
Harrie Lavreysen	2020 Summer Olympics	Track cycling	Men's sprint
Harrie Lavreysen	2020 Summer Olympics	Track cycling	Men's team sprint
Harrie Lavreysen	2020 Summer Olympics	Track cycling	Men's keirin
Bernard Leene	1928 Summer Olympics	Track cycling	Men's tandem
Bernard Leene	1932 Summer Olympics	Track cycling	Men's tandem
Bernard Leene	1936 Summer Olympics	Track cycling	Men's tandem
Leontine van der Lienden	1984 Summer Olympics	Road cycling	Women's road race
Pim Ligthart	2008 Summer Olympics	Track cycling	Men's team pursuit
Leijn Loevesijn	1968 Summer Olympics	Track cycling	Men's sprint
Leijn Loevesijn	1968 Summer Olympics	Track cycling	Men's tandem
Leijn Loevesijn	1968 Summer Olympics	Track cycling	Men's 1000m time trial
René Lotz	1960 Summer Olympics	Road cycling	Men's team time trial
René Lotz	1960 Summer Olympics	Road cycling	Men's road race
Jan Maas	1924 Summer Olympics	Road cycling	Men's time trial
Jan Maas	1924 Summer Olympics	Road cycling	Men's team time trial
Jan Maas	1924 Summer Olympics	Track cycling	Men's 50 kilometres
Jan Maas	1924 Summer Olympics	Track cycling	Men's team pursuit
Jan Maas	1928 Summer Olympics	Track cycling	Men's team pursuit
Jules Maenen	1952 Summer Olympics	Road cycling	Men's road race
Jules Maenen	1952 Summer Olympics	Road cycling	Men's team road race
Jules Maenen	1952 Summer Olympics	Track cycling	Men's team pursuit
Antoine Mazairac	1928 Summer Olympics	Track cycling	Men's sprint
Jacques van Meer	1980 Summer Olympics	Road cycling	Men's road race
Jacob Meijer	1924 Summer Olympics	Track cycling	Men's sprint
Mirjam Melchers	2004 Summer Olympics	Road cycling	Women's road race
Mirjam Melchers	2004 Summer Olympics	Road cycling	Women's time trial
Mirjam Melchers	2000 Summer Olympics	Road cycling	Women's time trial
Mirjam Melchers	2000 Summer Olympics	Road cycling	Women's road race
Mirjam Melchers	2008 Summer Olympics	Road cycling	Women's road race
Mirjam Melchers	2008 Summer Olympics	Road cycling	Women's time trial
Koos Moerenhout	2000 Summer Olympics	Road cycling	Men's time trial
Koos Moerenhout	2000 Summer Olympics	Road cycling	Men's road race
Gerrit Möhlmann	1976 Summer Olympics	Track cycling	Men's team pursuit
Bauke Mollema	2016 Summer Olympics	Road cycling	Men's road race
Bauke Mollema	2020 Summer Olympics	Road cycling	Men's road race
Rik Moorman	1984 Summer Olympics	Track cycling	Men's team pursuit
Jens Mouris	2000 Summer Olympics	Track cycling	Men's team pursuit
Jens Mouris	2004 Summer Olympics	Track cycling	Men's team pursuit
Jens Mouris	2008 Summer Olympics	Track cycling	Men's individual pursuit
Jens Mouris	2008 Summer Olympics	Track cycling	Men's team pursuit
Jens Mouris	2008 Summer Olympics	Track cycling	Men's madison
Teun Mulder	2004 Summer Olympics	Track cycling	Men's sprint
Teun Mulder	2004 Summer Olympics	Track cycling	Men's team sprint
Teun Mulder	2004 Summer Olympics	Track cycling	Men's time trial
Teun Mulder	2004 Summer Olympics	Track cycling	Men's keirin
Teun Mulder	2008 Summer Olympics	Track cycling	Men's sprint
Teun Mulder	2008 Summer Olympics	Track cycling	Men's keirin
Teun Mulder	2012 Summer Olympics	Track cycling	Men's keirin
Danny Nelissen	1996 Summer Olympics	Road cycling	Men's road race
Peter Nieuwenhuis	1976 Summer Olympics	Track cycling	Men's team pursuit
Henk Nieuwkamp	1968 Summer Olympics	Track cycling	Men's team pursuit
Henk Nijdam	1960 Summer Olympics	Track cycling	Men's team pursuit
Jelle Nijdam	1984 Summer Olympics	Track cycling	Men's team pursuit
Jelle Nijdam	1984 Summer Olympics	Track cycling	Men's individual pursuit
Dorus Nijland	1908 Summer Olympics	Track cycling	Men's 660 yards
Dorus Nijland	1908 Summer Olympics	Track cycling	Men's 5000 metres
Dorus Nijland	1908 Summer Olympics	Track cycling	Men's 20 kilometres
Dorus Nijland	1908 Summer Olympics	Track cycling	Men's 100 kilometres
Dorus Nijland	1908 Summer Olympics	Track cycling	Men's sprint
Dorus Nijland	1908 Summer Olympics	Track cycling	Men's team pursuit
Theo Nikkessen	1960 Summer Olympics	Track cycling	Men's team pursuit
Henk Ooms	1936 Summer Olympics	Track cycling	Men's tandem
Willem Ooms	1920 Summer Olympics	Track cycling	Men's 50 kilometres
Jaap Oudkerk	1960 Summer Olympics	Track cycling	Men's team pursuit
Jaap Oudkerk	1964 Summer Olympics	Track cycling	Men's team pursuit
Rinus Paul	1960 Summer Olympics	Track cycling	Men's tandem
Leo Peelen	1988 Summer Olympics	Track cycling	Men's team pursuit
Leo Peelen	1988 Summer Olympics	Track cycling	Men's points race
Maurice Peeters	1920 Summer Olympics	Track cycling	Men's sprint
Maurice Peeters	1920 Summer Olympics	Track cycling	Men's team pursuit
Maurice Peeters	1924 Summer Olympics	Track cycling	Men's sprint
Maurice Peeters	1924 Summer Olympics	Track cycling	Men's tandem
Bas Peters	2004 Summer Olympics	Mountain biking	Men's cross-country
Piet Peters	1948 Summer Olympics	Road cycling	Men's road race
Piet Peters	1948 Summer Olympics	Road cycling	Men's team road race
Amy Pieters	2012 Summer Olympics	Track cycling	Women's team pursuit
Amy Pieters	2020 Summer Olympics	Track cycling	Women's madison
Peter Pieters	1996 Summer Olympics	Track cycling	Men's points race
Peter Pieters	1996 Summer Olympics	Track cycling	Men's individual pursuit
Puck Pieterse	2016 Summer Olympics	Mountain biking	Women's cross-country
Sjaak Pieters	1976 Summer Olympics	Track cycling	Men's sprint
Jan Pieterse	1964 Summer Olympics	Road cycling	Men's team time trial
Jan Pieterse	1964 Summer Olympics	Road cycling	Men's road race
René Pijnen	1968 Summer Olympics	roadcycling	Men's team time trial
René Pijnen	1968 Summer Olympics	roadcycling	Men's road race
Jan Pijnenburg	1928 Summer Olympics	Track cycling	Men's team pursuit
Frits Pirard	1976 Summer Olympics	Road cycling	Men's team time trial
Jan Plantaz	1952 Summer Olympics	Road cycling	Men's road race
Jan Plantaz	1952 Summer Olympics	Road cycling	Men's team road race
Jan Plantaz	1952 Summer Olympics	Track cycling	Men's team pursuit
Adri van der Poel	1980 Summer Olympics	Road cycling	Men's team time trial
Adri van der Poel	1980 Summer Olympics	Road cycling	Men's road race
Mathieu van der Poel	2020 Summer Olympics	Mountain biking	Men's cross-country
Mathieu van der Poel	2024 Summer Olympics	Road cycling	Men's road race
Simon van Poelgeest	1924 Summer Olympics	Track cycling	Men's team pursuit
Twan Poels	1984 Summer Olympics	Road cycling	Men's road race
Wout Poels	2016 Summer Olympics	Road cycling	Men's road race
Herman Ponsteen	1972 Summer Olympics	Track cycling	Men's team pursuit
Herman Ponsteen	1976 Summer Olympics	Track cycling	Men's team pursuit
Herman Ponsteen	1976 Summer Olympics	Track cycling	Men's individual pursuit
Jean-Paul van Poppel	1984 Summer Olympics	Road cycling	Men's road race
Cees Priem	1972 Summer Olympics	Road cycling	Men's team time trial
Cees Priem	1972 Summer Olympics	Road cycling	Men's road race
Laurine van Riessen	2020 Summer Olympics	Track cycling	Women's sprint
Laurine van Riessen	2020 Summer Olympics	Track cycling	Women's team sprint
Laurine van Riessen	2020 Summer Olympics	Track cycling	Women's keirin
Thea van Rijnsoever	1984 Summer Olympics	Road cycling	Women's road race
Elsbeth van Rooy-Vink	2004 Summer Olympics	Mountain biking	Women's cross-country
Elsbeth van Rooy-Vink	2008 Summer Olympics	Mountain biking	Women's cross-country
Richard Rozendaal	1996 Summer Olympics	Track cycling	Men's team pursuit
Peter Schep	1996 Summer Olympics	Track cycling	Men's team pursuit
Peter Schep	2000 Summer Olympics	Track cycling	Men's team pursuit
Peter Schep	2004 Summer Olympics	Track cycling	Men's points race
Peter Schep	2004 Summer Olympics	Track cycling	Men's team pursuit
Peter Schep	2008 Summer Olympics	Track cycling	Men's points race
Peter Schep	2008 Summer Olympics	Track cycling	Men's madison
Jan-Willem van Schip	2016 Summer Olympics	Track cycling	Men's team pursuit
Jan-Willem van Schip	2020 Summer Olympics	Track cycling	Men's madison
Jan-Willem van Schip	2020 Summer Olympics	Track cycling	Men's omnium
Roy Schuiten	1972 Summer Olympics	Track cycling	Men's team pursuit
Roy Schuiten	1972 Summer Olympics	Track cycling	Men's individual pursuit
Gerrit Schulte	1936 Summer Olympics	Road cycling	Men's individual road race
Gerrit Schulte	1936 Summer Olympics	Road cycling	Men's team road race
Frits Schür	1976 Summer Olympics	Road cycling	Men's road race
Cor Schuuring	1964 Summer Olympics	Track cycling	Men's team pursuit
Robert Slippens	1996 Summer Olympics	Track cycling	Men's team pursuit
Robert Slippens	2000 Summer Olympics	Track cycling	Men's madison
Robert Slippens	2000 Summer Olympics	Track cycling	Men's team pursuit
Robert Slippens	2004 Summer Olympics	Track cycling	Men's madison
Robert Slippens	2008 Summer Olympics	Track cycling	Men's team pursuit
Gerrit Slot	1976 Summer Olympics	Track cycling	Men's team pursuit
Ab Sluis	1960 Summer Olympics	Road cycling	Men's team time trial
Laura Smulders	2012 Summer Olympics	BMX	Women's BMX
Laura Smulders	2016 Summer Olympics	BMX	Women's BMX
Laura Smulders	2020 Summer Olympics	BMX	Women's BMX
Merel Smulders	2020 Summer Olympics	BMX	Women's BMX
Johannes van Spengen	1908 Summer Olympics	Track cycling	Men's 660 yards
Johannes van Spengen	1908 Summer Olympics	Track cycling	Men's 5000 metres
Johannes van Spengen	1908 Summer Olympics	Track cycling	Men's 20 kilometres
Johannes van Spengen	1908 Summer Olympics	Track cycling	Men's sprint
Johannes van Spengen	1908 Summer Olympics	Track cycling	Men's team pursuit
Danny Stam	2000 Summer Olympics	Track cycling	Men's madison
Danny Stam	2004 Summer Olympics	Track cycling	Men's madison
Niels van der Steen	1992 Summer Olympics	Track cycling	Men's team pursuit
Harry Steevens	1964 Summer Olympics	Road cycling	Men's road race
Arie van der Stel	1920 Summer Olympics	Road cycling	Men's time trial
Arie van der Stel	1920 Summer Olympics	Road cycling	Men's team time trial
Arie van der Stel	1920 Summer Olympics	Track cycling	Men's 50 kilometres
Jeroen Straathof	2004 Summer Olympics	Track cycling	Men's team pursuit
Wim Stroetinga	2008 Summer Olympics	Track cycling	Men's team pursuit
Wim Stroetinga	2012 Summer Olympics	Track cycling	Men's team pursuit
Wim Stroetinga	2016 Summer Olympics	Track cycling	Men's team pursuit
Ad Tak	1976 Summer Olympics	Road cycling	Men's road race
Anne Tauber	2020 Summer Olympics	Mountain biking	Women's cross-country
Anne Terpstra	2016 Summer Olympics	Mountain biking	Women's cross-country
Anne Terpstra	2020 Summer Olympics	Mountain biking	Women's cross-country
Anne Terpstra	2020 Summer Olympics	Women's cross-country	
Niki Terpstra	2008 Summer Olympics	Road cycling	Men's road race
Niki Terpstra	2012 Summer Olympics	Road cycling	Men's road race
Patrick Tolhoek	2000 Summer Olympics	Mountain biking	Men's cross-country
Henny Top	1984 Summer Olympics	Road cycling	Women's road race
Piet van der Touw	1960 Summer Olympics	Track cycling	Men's sprint
Piet van der Touw	1960 Summer Olympics	Track cycling	Men's 1000m time trial
Piet van der Touw	1964 Summer Olympics	Track cycling	Men's sprint
Piet van der Touw	1964 Summer Olympics	Track cycling	Men's 1000m time trial
Piet van der Touw	1964 Summer Olympics	Track cycling	Men's tandem
Milan Vader	2020 Summer Olympics	Mountain biking	Men's cross-country
Lau Veldt	1980 Summer Olympics	Track cycling	Men's sprint
Tim Veldt	2012 Summer Olympics	Track cycling	Men's team pursuit
Tim Veldt	2016 Summer Olympics	Track cycling	Men's team pursuit
Tim Veldt	2016 Summer Olympics	Track cycling	Men's omnium
Nico Verhoeven	1984 Summer Olympics	Road cycling	Men's road race
Philippus Vethaak	1936 Summer Olympics	Road cycling	Men's individual road race
Philippus Vethaak	1936 Summer Olympics	Road cycling	Men's team road race
Aart Vierhouten	1996 Summer Olympics	Road cycling	Men's road race
Michael Vingerling	2012 Summer Olympics	Track cycling	Men's team pursuit
Elsbeth Vink	1996 Summer Olympics	Road cycling	Women's road race
Elsbeth Vink	1996 Summer Olympics	Road cycling	Men's cross-country
Adrie Visser	2004 Summer Olympics	Track cycling	Women's points race
Annemiek van Vleuten	2012 Summer Olympics	Road cycling	Women's road race
Annemiek van Vleuten	2016 Summer Olympics	Road cycling	Women's road race
Annemiek van Vleuten	2020 Summer Olympics	Road cycling	Women's road race
Annemiek van Vleuten	2020 Summer Olympics	Road cycling	Women's time trial
Arie van Vliet	1936 Summer Olympics	Track cycling	Men's 1000m time trial
Arie van Vliet	1936 Summer Olympics	Track cycling	Men's sprint
Leo van Vliet	1976 Summer Olympics	Road cycling	Men's road race
Martinus Vlietman	1924 Summer Olympics	Road cycling	Men's time trial
Martinus Vlietman	1924 Summer Olympics	Road cycling	Men's team time trial
Ben van der Voort	1936 Summer Olympics	Track cycling	Men's team pursuit
Adrie Voorting	1952 Summer Olympics	Road cycling	Men's road race
Adrie Voorting	1952 Summer Olympics	Road cycling	Men's team road race
Adrie Voorting	1952 Summer Olympics	Track cycling	Men's team pursuit
Gerrit Voorting	1948 Summer Olympics	Road cycling	Men's road race
Gerrit Voorting	1948 Summer Olympics	Road cycling	Men's team road race
Gerrit Voorting	1948 Summer Olympics	Track cycling	Men's team pursuit
Demi Vollering	2020 Summer Olympics	Road cycling	Women's road race
Demi Vollering	2024 Summer Olympics	Road cycling	Women's time trial
Demi Vollering	2024 Summer Olympics	Road cycling	Women's road race
Marianne Vos	2008 Summer Olympics	Road cycling	Women's road race
Marianne Vos	2008 Summer Olympics	Road cycling	Women's time trial
Marianne Vos	2008 Summer Olympics	Track cycling	Women's points race
Marianne Vos	2012 Summer Olympics	Road cycling	Women's road race
Marianne Vos	2012 Summer Olympics	Road cycling	Women's time trial
Marianne Vos	2016 Summer Olympics	Road cycling	Women's road race
Marianne Vos	2020 Summer Olympics	Road cycling	Women's road race
Marianne Vos	2024 Summer Olympics	Road cycling	Women's road race
Bart Voskamp	1992 Summer Olympics	Road cycling	Men's team time trial
Franciscus de Vreng	1920 Summer Olympics	Track cycling	Men's sprint
Franciscus de Vreng	1920 Summer Olympics	Track cycling	Men's team pursuit
Franciscus de Vreng	1920 Summer Olympics	Track cycling	Men's tandem
Gerrit de Vries	1988 Summer Olympics	Road cycling	Men's team time trial
Franciscus Waterreus	1924 Summer Olympics	Track cycling	Men's team pursuit
Gerrit van Wees	1936 Summer Olympics	Track cycling	Men's team pursuit
Cora Westland	1988 Summer Olympics	Road cycling	Women's road race
Lieuwe Westra	2012 Summer Olympics	Road cycling	Men's road race
Lieuwe Westra	2012 Summer Olympics	Road cycling	Men's time trial
Lorena Wiebes	2024 Summer Olympics	Road cycling	Women's road race
Kirsten Wild	2012 Summer Olympics	Track cycling	Women's team pursuit
Kirsten Wild	2012 Summer Olympics	Track cycling	Women's omnium
Kirsten Wild	2016 Summer Olympics	Track cycling	Women's omnium
Kirsten Wild	2020 Summer Olympics	Track cycling	Women's omnium
Kirsten Wild	2020 Summer Olympics	Track cycling	Women's madison
Robert de Wilde	2008 Summer Olympics	BMX	Men's BMX
Rob van den Wildenberg	2008 Summer Olympics	BMX	Men's BMX
Ko Willems	1924 Summer Olympics	Track cycling	Men's 50 kilometres
Peter Winnen	1980 Summer Olympics	Road cycling	Men's road race
Michel Zanoli	1988 Summer Olympics	Road cycling	Men's team time trial
Michel Zanoli	1988 Summer Olympics	Road cycling	Men's road race
Leontien Zijlaard	1992 Summer Olympics	Track cycling	Women's individual pursuit
Leontien Zijlaard	1992 Summer Olympics	Track cycling	Women's road race
Leontien Zijlaard	2000 Summer Olympics	Road cycling	Women's time trial
Leontien Zijlaard	2000 Summer Olympics	Road cycling	Women's road race
Leontien Zijlaard	2000 Summer Olympics	Track cycling	Women's points race
Leontien Zijlaard	2000 Summer Olympics	Track cycling	Women's individual pursuit
Leontien Zijlaard	2004 Summer Olympics	Road cycling	Women's road race
Leontien Zijlaard	2004 Summer Olympics	Road cycling	Women's time trial
Leontien Zijlaard	2004 Summer Olympics	Track cycling	Women's individual pursuit
Anouska van der Zee	2004 Summer Olympics	Road cycling	Women's road race
Bart Zoet	1964 Summer Olympics	Road cycling	Men's team time trial
Bart Zoet	1964 Summer Olympics	Road cycling	Men's road race
Joop Zoetemelk	1968 Summer Olympics	Track cycling	Men's team pursuit
Joop Zoetemelk	1968 Summer Olympics	Road cycling	Men's team time trial
Joop Zoetemelk	1968 Summer Olympics	Road cycling	Men's road race
Wilco Zuijderwijk	2000 Summer Olympics	Track cycling	Men's points race
Wilco Zuijderwijk	2000 Summer Olympics	Track cycling	Men's team pursuit
Adrie Zwartepoorte	1936 Summer Olympics	Track cycling	Men's team pursuit
