= Karl Klöckner =

German cyclist

Personal information
- Born: 12 January 1915 Cologne, German Empire

Cycling career
- Sport: Cycling
- Discipline: Track
- Role: Rider

Amateur team
- RV Arminius Köln

Major wins
- German tandem champion (1935)

Karl Klöckner (born 12 January 1915, date of death unknown) was a German cyclist. was a German track cyclist. He won the German tandem championship in 1935 and represented Germany in the men's team pursuit at the 1936 Summer Olympics, finishing fourth.

== Career ==
Klöckner was born in Cologne and rode for Radfahrer-Verein Arminius Köln. In 1935, he and Heiner Hoffmann won the German tandem championship.

At the 1936 Olympics in Berlin, Klöckner rode in Germany's 4,000-metre team pursuit squad alongside Erich Arndt, Heinz Hasselberg and Hoffmann. The quartet won its opening heat and quarter-final before losing the semi-final to eventual champions France. Germany then lost the bronze-medal race to Great Britain and finished fourth overall.
