= Boonstra =

Boonstra is a West Frisian toponymic surname, indicating an origin in the town of Oldeboorn or from near the river De Boorne, after which the town was named. Notable people with the surname include:

- Albert Boonstra (born 1957), Dutch swimmer
- Clarence A. Boonstra (1914–2006), American ambassador
- Cor Boonstra (1938–2025), Dutch businessman and chief executive
- Dirk Boonstra (1893–1944), Dutch police officer
- Lieuwe Dirk Boonstra (1905–1975), South African paleontologist
- Miranda Boonstra (born 1972), Dutch long-distance runner
- Tjabel Boonstra (1899–1968), Dutch cyclist
- Todd Boonstra (born 1961), American cross-country skier
