= Durniok =

Durniok is a surname. Notable people with the surname include:

- Manfred Durniok (1934–2003), German film producer, director, and screenwriter
- Roman Durniok (1928–1993), Polish football defender
