= Velodromo Vigorelli =

Velodrome in Milan, Italy

Coordinates: 45°28′53″N 9°9′29″E

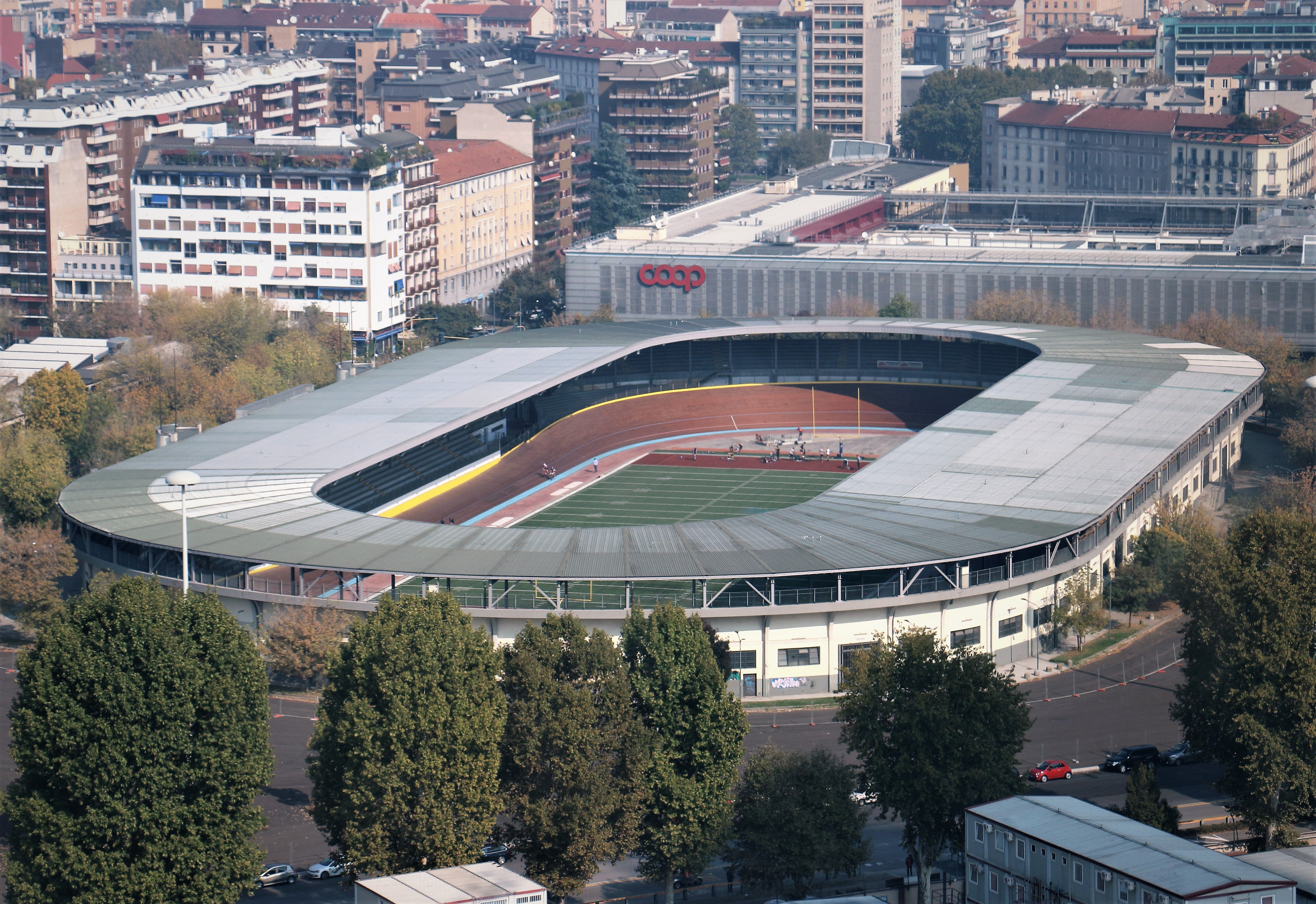
Velodromo Vigorelli 2018 veduta dall'alto

Velodromo Vigorelli (from 2001 officially Velodromo Maspes-Vigorelli) is a 397-metre (434 yd; 1,302 ft) semi-covered velodrome in Milan, Italy. It is currently used mostly for American football events; surrounded by the track, there is a standard size football field in synthetic turf. In 2013 it was the home of the IFAF European Football Championship. It is currently the home stadium for the football teams Seamen Milano and Rhinos Milano. It played host to the first ever Gridiron Nations Championship game on 9 November 2025 with Italy hosting Canada.

The stadium holds 9,000 people and was built in 1935 by Vigorelli Cycles. It was burned down during the Second World War after bombing of Milan by the RAF but then rebuilt.

The stadium was home to the hour record from 1935 to 1967 and the one-hour tandem record of Ernest Mills and Bill Paul from 1937 to 2000. It hosted the UCI Track Cycling World Championships in 1939, 1951, 1955 and 1962. After years of neglect and planned demolitions, campaigning by local enthusiasts led to the approval by local authorities in March 2014 of plans to renovate the velodrome.

The stadium has also hosted music events, including the Beatles' concert on 24 June 1965. It was the site of a concert by English rock band Led Zeppelin which took place during the band's 1971 European tour, well known for its descent into a violent riot between concert attendees and the local police.

== Hour record ==
=== Men's hour record ===
The hour record for bicycles is the record for the longest distance cycled in one hour. From 1935–1967 it was set exclusively at the Velodromo Vigorelli by nine different cyclists in 10 rides.

In 1935 Giuseppe Olmo took the record by covering 45 km (28 mi), exceeding the distance set at Sint-Truiden in Belgium by 313 m (1,027 ft). He established the track's reputation as fastest in the world. From 1936 Maurice Richard; Frans Slaats; Maurice Archambaud; François Faure; Fausto Coppi; Jacques Anquetil; Ercole Baldini and Roger Rivière added a further 2,257 m (7,405 ft) to the record, until the Olympic track in Rome became faster.

=== Tandem one-hour record ===
In 1937 Mills and Paul set the tandem record at 49.991 km (31.063 mi). The trip had been funded by readers of Cycling. This record stood until on 23 September 2000 at Manchester velodrome it was beaten by Simon Keeton and Jon Rickard of Rutland Cycling Club.

=== Women's hour record ===
On 25 September 1958, Manx cyclist Millie Robinson broke the women's world hour record (plus the 10km and 20km records) at Vigorelli, achieving a distance of 39.718 km (24.680 mi), beating the old record by 1.149 km (0.714 mi). The record lasted just over a month; Elsy Jacobs broke the record at Vigorelli on 9 November 1958, riding a distance of 41.347 km (25.692 mi). The record stood for 14 years.

== See also ==
- Harry Hill (cyclist)
- List of cycling tracks and velodromes
