= Wölfl =

Wölfl is a surname. Notable people with the surname include:

- Franjo Wölfl (1918–1987), Croatian and Yugoslav footballer
- Karl Wölfl (1914–2004), Austrian cyclist
