= Velinov =

Velinov (masculine, Bulgarian: Велинов) or Velinova (feminine, Bulgarian: Велинова) is a Bulgarian surname. Notable people with the surname include:

- Georgi Velinov (1957–2026), Bulgarian footballer and manager
- Georgi Velinov (cyclist) (1912–?), Bulgarian cyclist
- Iskra Velinova (born 1953), Bulgarian rower
- Kristiyan Velinov (born 1991), Bulgarian footballer
- Ventsislav Velinov (born 1981), Bulgarian footballer
