= Dissing =

Dissing may refer to:

- Diss (music), songs primarily intended to disrespect people
- Dissing+Weitling, architecture and design practice in Copenhagen, Denmark
- Heino Dissing (1912–1990), Danish cyclist
- Henry Dissing (1931–2009), Danish mycologist
- Povl Dissing (1938–2022), Danish singer, musician, and composer
