= Erich Arndt =

Erich Arndt may refer to:

- Erich Arndt (cyclist) (1911–1961), German cyclist
- Erich Arndt (table tennis) (1938–2026), German table tennis player

== See also ==
- Enzo Amore (Eric Arndt, born 1986), American professional wrestler
