= Cycling at the 1936 Summer Olympics – Men's team pursuit =

Cycling - Men's team pursuit at the Games of the XI Olympiad
- Venue: Olympic Cycling Stadium, Berlin
- Dates: 6–8 August 1936
- Competitors: 53 from 13 nations

Medalists
1st place, gold medalist(s)		Robert Charpentier, Jean Goujon, Guy Lapébie, Roger-Jean Le Nizerhy; France
2nd place, silver medalist(s)		Bianco Bianchi, Mario Gentili, Armando Latini, Severino Rigoni; Italy
3rd place, bronze medalist(s)		Harry Hill, Ernest Johnson, Charles King, Ernie Mills; Great Britain

The men's team pursuit cycling event at the 1936 Summer Olympics took place on 6 to 8 August and was one of six events at the 1936 Olympics.

== Results ==
=== Round 1 ===
The top eight teams by time advanced to the second round. Bulgaria competed alone in its heat. Italy (heat 1), Denmark (heat 3), and Germany (heat 6) each briefly held the Olympic record in turn before France (heat 7) finished the round with it. The Dutch team was close to catching the American team before two riders crashed.

Rank	Heat	Name	Nation	Time	Notes
1	7	Robert Charpentier; Jean Goujon; Guy Lapébie; Roger-Jean Le Nizerhy	France	4:41.8	Q, OR
2	6	Erich Arndt; Heinz Hasselberg; Heiner Hoffmann; Karl Klöckner	Germany	4:48.6	Q
3	3	Karl Magnussen; Erik Friis; Helge Jacobsen; Hans Christian Nielsen; Arne Pedersen	Denmark	4:49.4	Q
4	1	Bianco Bianchi; Mario Gentili; Armando Latini; Severino Rigoni	Italy	4:49.6	Q
5	7	Harry Hill; Ernest Johnson; Charles King; Ernie Mills	Great Britain	4:50.0	Q
6	2	Jean Alexandre; Frans Cools; Auguste Garrebeek; Armand Putzeyse	Belgium	4:54.0	Q
7	3	Walter Richli; Ernst Fuhrimann; Albert Kägi; Werner Wägelin	Switzerland	4:56.4	Q
8	2	István Liszkay; Miklós Németh; László Orczán; Ferenc Pelvássy	Hungary	4:57.8	Q
9	1	Lionel Coleman; George Crompton; Bob McLeod; George Turner	Canada	4:58.4	
10	6	Josef Genschieder; Josef Moser; Karl Schmaderer; Karl Wölfl	Austria	5:02.2	
11	5	Albert Byrd; William Logan; Charles Morton; John Sinibaldi	United States	5:07.4	
12	4	Marin Nikolov; Bogdan Yanchev; Georgi Velinov; Sava Gerchev	Bulgaria	5:10.4	
13	5	Chris Kropman; Adrie Zwartepoorte; Ben van der Voort; Gerrit van Wees	Netherlands	DNF	

=== Round 2 ===
The teams with the four best times from the second round advanced to the semifinals.

Rank	Heat	Name	Nation	Time	Notes
1	1	Robert Charpentier; Jean Goujon; Guy Lapébie; Roger-Jean Le Nizerhy	France	4:47.2	Q
2	4	Bianco Bianchi; Mario Gentili; Armando Latini; Severino Rigoni	Italy	4:47.4	Q
3	4	Harry Hill; Ernest Johnson; Charles King; Ernie Mills	Great Britain	4:51.0	Q
4	2	Erich Arndt; Heinz Hasselberg; Heiner Hoffmann; Karl Klöckner	Germany	4:56.2	Q
5	2	Walter Richli; Ernst Fuhrimann; Albert Kägi; Werner Wägelin	Switzerland	4:58.0	
6	3	Jean Alexandre; Frans Cools; Auguste Garrebeek; Armand Putzeyse	Belgium	4:58.2	
7	1	István Liszkay; Miklós Németh; László Orczán; Ferenc Pelvássy	Hungary	5:03.4	
8	3	Karl Magnussen; Erik Friis; Helge Jacobsen; Hans Christian Nielsen; Arne Pedersen	Denmark	DNF	

=== Semifinals ===
The winning team in each semifinal advanced to the gold medal final. The losers competed in the bronze medal final.

Semifinal 1

Rank	Name	Nation	Time	Notes
1	Robert Charpentier; Jean Goujon; Guy Lapébie; Roger-Jean Le Nizerhy	France	4:42.4	Q, OR
2	Erich Arndt; Heinz Hasselberg; Heiner Hoffmann; Karl Klöckner	Germany	4:54.6	B

Semifinal 2

Rank	Name	Nation	Time	Notes
1	Bianco Bianchi; Mario Gentili; Armando Latini; Severino Rigoni	Italy	4:49.2	Q
2	Harry Hill; Ernest Johnson; Charles King; Ernie Mills	Great Britain	4:53.6	B

=== Finals ===
Gold medal final

Rank	Name	Nation	Time
1st place, gold medalist(s)	Robert Charpentier; Jean Goujon; Guy Lapébie; Roger-Jean Le Nizerhy	France	4:45.0
2nd place, silver medalist(s)	Bianco Bianchi; Mario Gentili; Armando Latini; Severino Rigoni	Italy	4:51.0

Bronze medal final

Rank	Name	Nation	Time
3rd place, bronze medalist(s)	Harry Hill; Ernest Johnson; Charles King; Ernie Mills	Great Britain	4:53.6
4	Erich Arndt; Heinz Hasselberg; Heiner Hoffmann; Karl Klöckner	Germany	4:55.0
