= Pieter Beets =

Dutch cyclist

Personal information
- Born: 7 March 1900 Amsterdam, Netherlands
- Died: 28 April 1996 (aged 96) Amsterdam, Netherlands

Cycling career
- Sport: Cycling

Pieter Beets (7 March 1900 – 28 April 1996) was a Dutch cyclist. He competed in two events at the 1920 Summer Olympics.

== See also ==
- List of Dutch Olympic cyclists
