= Helge Jacobsen =

Danish cyclist

Personal information
- Born: 2 January 1915 Copenhagen, Denmark
- Died: 2 August 1974 (aged 59) Härnösand, Denmark

Cycling career
- Sport: Cycling

Helge Jacobsen (2 January 1915 – 2 August 1974) was a Danish cyclist. He competed in the team pursuit event at the 1936 Summer Olympics.
