= Fritz Ganz =

Swiss cyclist and politician

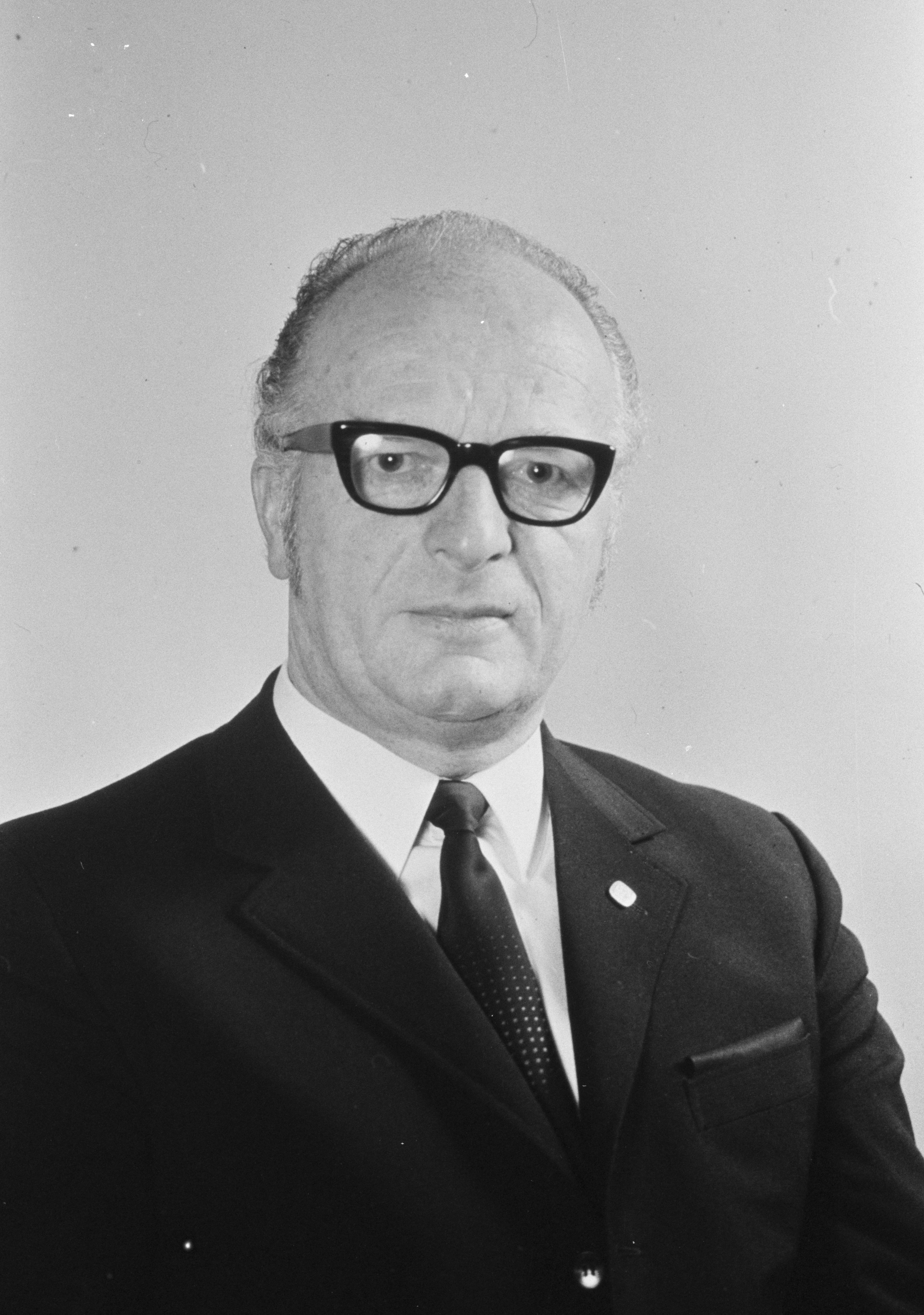

Personal information
- Born: 20 February 1916 Zürich, Switzerland
- Died: 31 March 1992 (aged 76) Zürich, Switzerland

Cycling career
- Sport: Cycling

Fritz Ganz (20 February 1916 – 31 March 1992) was a Swiss cyclist and politician. He competed in the tandem event at the 1936 Summer Olympics. From 1971 till 1983 he was member of the Swiss parliament.
