= Ernie Mills (cyclist) =

English cyclist (1913–1972)

Ernest Mills
Personal information
- Full name: Ernest Victor Mills
- Nickname: Ernie
- Born: 10 April 1913 Croydon, England
- Died: 10 October 1972 (aged 59)

Cycling career
- Sport: Cycling

Amateur team
- circa 1930-1939: Addiscombe Cycle Club
Medal record
Men's cycling
Representing United Kingdom
Olympic Games
Bronze medal – third place	1936 Berlin	Team Pursuit

Ernest Victor Mills (10 April 1913 – 10 October 1972), commonly known as Ernie Mills, was an English amateur cyclist who, with his teammate Bill Paul, set the British 12-hour record on a tandem in 1934 and re-established it in 1936 with a 'world's best performance'. In 1937, in Italy, they set the world one-hour tandem record which stood for 63 years until September 2000. The Addiscombe Cycle Club teammates set 20 world and British records at both short and long distances.

Mills represented Great Britain at the 1936 Summer Olympic Games in Berlin and won a bronze medal in the Team Pursuit. At the 1938 British Empire Games in Sydney Australia, he won a bronze medal in the 1,000 metre Time-Trial

In 1937 Cycling Weekly jointly awarded him and Bill Paul their own page in the Golden Book of Cycling.

== Personal life ==
Mills lived in the Addiscombe area near Croydon, London.

== Career ==
In 1934 Mills was paired with his teammate, William George (Bill) Paul, ('stoker') (1910 - 29 January 2003) also from the Addiscombe Cycle Club in Croydon. Initially they had been on opposing tandem teams but together they covered over 30 miles in one hour in 1936 and won a 10-minute pursuit race in less than four minutes.

Together they set the British 12-hour tandem record in 1934, and, after losing it in 1936 to both G.A.Birtchnell and C.G.Taylor, and later C.C.Melhuish and H.G.Chapman, Mills and Paul then retook the record in September 1936 with a 'world's best performance'.

In 1936 Mills and Paul set a British record for a 30-mile ride on a tandem, covering the distance in 1 hour 5 minutes 3 seconds.

He represented Great Britain at the 1936 Summer Olympic Games in Berlin, and won a bronze medal in the Team Pursuit along with his colleagues Harry Hill, Ernest Johnson and Charles King.

In 1937 Mills and Paul set the 'World Tandem Hour Record', 31.06 miles (49.991 km), at the Velodromo Vigorelli (Velodromo Comunale Vigorelli) track in Milan owned by 'Vigorelli Cycles'. The trip had been funded by readers of Cycling magazine. This record stood until Sept 23rd 2000 at Manchester Velodrome when it was beaten by Simon Keeton and Jon Rickard of Rutland Cycling Club.

Mills represented England at the 1938 British Empire Games in Sydney Australia, where he won a bronze medal in the 1,000 metre Time-Trial behind the Australians Bob Porter and Tasman Johnson. He finished fourth in the road race and also competed in 10 miles scratch event.

As of 2011 Mills and Paul's 1938 100-mile tandem record at Addiscombe Cycle Club of still stands.

== Commemoration ==
=== Addiscombe Cycle Club ===
Mills is commemorated every year at Addiscombe C.C. by an array of awards presented in his name for all sporting categories, road, track, ladies, juniors and the open time trial.

- Open Events Trophy, E.V.Mills Memorial Trophy donated by Club subscription and awarded to the winner of the club's Open 25 miles time trial. Currently held by Peter Tadros of InGear Quickvit Trainsharp
- Time Trial Trophy, E.V.Mills Racing Fund Trophy presented by Ernie Mills and awarded to the member who attains the runner-up position in the Club Championship table.
- Track Trophy, Sprint Championship Trophy presented by Ernie Mills for the winner of the club's Sprint Championship. Currently held by Steve Broomfield of Addiscombe CC
- Junior Path Trophy, presented by Ernie Mills and awarded to the Junior recording the best track performance. Currently held by Thomas Hawkes of Addiscombe CC
- Ladies Sprint Championship, presented by Ernie Mills and awarded to the winner of the club's Ladies Sprint Championship.

=== The Golden Book ===
Mills & Paul's achievements were celebrated in 1937 when Cycling Weekly awarded them their own page in the Golden Book of Cycling.

=== Cigarette cards ===
In 1939 Mills and Paul's efforts were celebrated nationally when John Player & Sons issued a Cigarette card of them on their tandem. In a series of 50 cards called Cycling 1839-1939, they were featured on card no.45 titled Tandem track position.
