= Miklós Németh (cyclist) =

Hungarian cyclist

Personal information
- Born: 15 April 1910

Cycling career
- Sport: Cycling

Miklós Németh (born 15 April 1910, date of death unknown) was a Hungarian cyclist. He competed in the tandem and team pursuit events at the 1936 Summer Olympics.
