= Albert Kägi =

Swiss cyclist

Personal information
- Born: 22 December 1912

Cycling career
- Sport: Cycling

Albert Kägi (born 22 December 1912, date of death unknown) was a Swiss cyclist. He competed in the team pursuit event at the 1936 Summer Olympics.
