= Karl Schmaderer =

Austrian cyclist

Personal information
- Born: 2 September 1914 Vienna, Austria
- Died: 14 June 2000 (aged 85)

Cycling career
- Sport: Cycling

Karl Schmaderer (2 September 1914 – 14 June 2000) was an Austrian cyclist. Schmaderer competed in the team pursuit event at the 1936 Summer Olympics.
