= Robert Charpentier =

French cyclist (1916–1966)

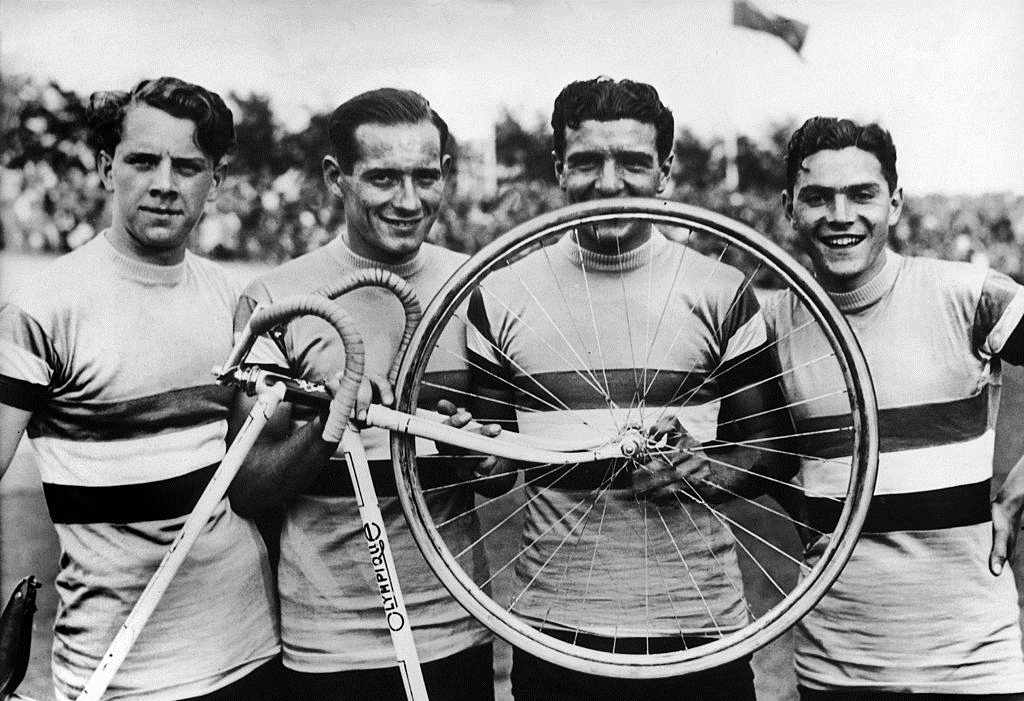
- Charpentier (left) at the 1936 Olympics

Personal information
- Born: 4 April 1916 Maule, France
- Died: 28 October 1966 (aged 50) Issy-les-Moulineaux, France

Sport
- Sport: Cycling
- Club: Vélo Club de Levallois
Medal record
Representing France
Men's road bicycle racing
Olympic Games
| Gold medal – first place | 1936 Berlin | Individual road race |
| Gold medal – first place | 1936 Berlin | Team road race |
| Gold medal – first place | 1936 Berlin | Team pursuit |
World Championships
| Silver medal – second place | 1935 Floreffe | Amateur's road race |

Robert Charpentier (4 April 1916 – 28 October 1966) was a French racing cyclist who won three gold medals at the 1936 Summer Olympics. In 1937 he turned professional and rode in the 1947 Tour de France.
