= Charles King (cyclist) =

English cyclist

Personal information
- Full name: Charles Thomas King
- Born: 6 December 1911 Putney, London, England
- Died: 19 July 2001 (aged 89) Wellington, New Zealand
Medal record
Representing GBR
Men's cycling
Olympic Games
Bronze medal – third place	1936 Berlin	4000m Team Pursuit

Charles Thomas King (6 December 1911 – 19 July 2001) was an English cyclist. He won a bronze medal in the 1936 Berlin Olympics in the 4000m team pursuit with Ernest Mills, Ernest Johnson and Harry Heaton Hill.

He emigrated to New Zealand in the 1950s, where he remained active in the cycling scene as a custom frame builder under the marquee PRENDERO. He was also an active member of the Auckland Cycle Touring Association where he was president in the 1990s and a lifetime member.
