= Josef Moser (cyclist) =

Austrian cyclist

Personal information
- Born: 24 January 1917 Vienna, Austria-Hungary
- Died: 18 August 1944 (aged 27) Latvia

Cycling career
- Sport: Cycling

Josef Moser (24 January 1917 – 18 August 1944) was an Austrian cyclist. He competed in the team pursuit event at the 1936 Summer Olympics. He was killed in action during World War II.
