= Ben van der Voort =

Dutch cyclist

Personal information
- Born: 7 October 1914 Utrecht, Netherlands
- Died: 12 March 2002 (aged 87) Merksem, Belgium

Cycling career
- Sport: Cycling

Ben van der Voort (7 October 1914 – 12 March 2002) was a Dutch cyclist. He competed in the team pursuit event at the 1936 Summer Olympics.

== See also ==
- List of Dutch Olympic cyclists
