= Bruno Loatti =

Italian cyclist

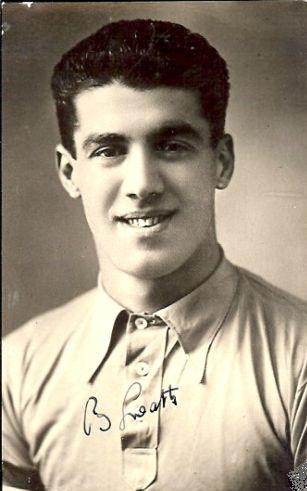

Personal information
- Born: 26 February 1915 Ravenna, Italy
- Died: 25 September 1962 (aged 47) Bologna, Italy

Cycling career
- Sport: Cycling

Bruno Loatti (26 February 1915 – 25 September 1962) was an Italian cyclist. He competed in the tandem event at the 1936 Summer Olympics.
