= Bill Paul (cyclist) =

English amateur cyclist

W.G. Bill Paul
Personal information
- Full name: William George (Bill) Paul
- Nicknames: Bill; The Tandem King
- Born: c. 1910 Croydon?
- Died: 29 January 2003

Cycling career
- Sport: Cycling

Amateur team
- circa 1930–1939: Addiscombe Cycle Club

William George Paul (1910 – 29 January 2003) was an English amateur cyclist who, with his team-mate 'Ernie' Mills, set the British 12-hour record on a tandem in 1934 and re-established it in 1936 with a 'world's best performance'. In 1937, in Italy, they set the world one-hour tandem record which stood for 63 years until September 2000. The Addiscombe Cycle Club team-mates set 20 world and British records at both short and long distances.

His achievements were celebrated in 1937 when Cycling Weekly jointly awarded him and Ernie Mills their own page in the Golden Book of Cycling.

== Personal life ==
Paul lived in the Addiscombe area near Croydon, London.

== Career ==
In 1934 Bill Paul was paired with his club team-mate, Ernie Mills, also from the Addiscombe Cycle Club in Croydon. Initially they had been on opposing tandem teams but together they covered over 30 miles in one hour in 1936 and won a 10-minute pursuit race in less than four minutes.

Together they set the British 12-hour tandem record in 1934, and, after losing it in 1936 to both G.A.Birtchnell and C.G.Taylor, and later C.C.Melhuish and H.G.Chapman, Mills and Paul then retook the record in September 1936 with a 'world's best performance'.

In 1936 Mills and Paul set a British record for a 30-mile ride on a tandem, covering the distance in 1 hour 5 minutes 3 seconds.

In 1937 Mills and Paul set the 'World Tandem Hour Record', 31.06 miles (49.991 km), at the Velodromo Vigorelli (Velodromo Comunale Vigorelli) track in Milan owned by 'Vigorelli Cycles'. The trip had been funded by readers of Cycling magazine. This record stood until 23 September 2000 at Manchester Velodrome when it was beaten by Simon Keeton and Jon Rickard of Rutland Cycling Club.

As of 2011 Mills and Paul's 1938 100-mile tandem record at Addiscombe Cycle Club of still stands.

== Commemoration ==
=== The Golden Book ===
Mills & Paul's achievements were celebrated in 1937 when Cycling Weekly awarded them their own page in the Golden Book of Cycling.

=== Cigarette cards ===
In 1939 Mills and Paul's efforts were celebrated nationally when John Player & Sons issued a Cigarette card of them on their tandem. In a series of 50 cards called Cycling 1839-1939, they were featured on card no.45 titled Tandem track position.
