= Jonas Persson (cyclist) =

Swedish cyclist

Personal information
- Born: 24 May 1913 Uppsala, Sweden
- Died: 7 May 1986 (aged 72) Stockholm, Sweden

Cycling career
- Sport: Cycling

Jonas Persson (24 May 1913 – 7 May 1986) was a Swedish cyclist. He competed in the 1000m time trial event at the 1936 Summer Olympics.
