= Erik Friis =

Danish cyclist (1916–1983)

Personal information
- Born: 23 January 1916 Copenhagen, Denmark
- Died: 11 October 1983 (aged 67) Vangede, Denmark

Cycling career
- Sport: Cycling

Knud Erik Friis (23 January 1916 – 11 October 1983) was a Danish cyclist. He competed in the team pursuit event at the 1936 Summer Olympics.
