= Chris Kropman =

Dutch cyclist

Personal information
- Born: 10 October 1919 Nijmegen, Netherlands
- Died: 29 March 2003 (aged 83) Bilthoven, Netherlands

Cycling career
- Sport: Cycling

Chris Kropman (10 October 1919 – 29 March 2003) was a Dutch cyclist. He competed in the team pursuit event at the 1936 Summer Olympics.

== See also ==
- List of Dutch Olympic cyclists
