= Adrie Zwartepoorte =

Dutch cyclist

Personal information
- Born: 18 February 1917 Den Helder, Netherlands
- Died: 24 March 1991 (aged 74) Amstelveen, Netherlands

Cycling career
- Sport: Cycling

Adrie Zwartepoorte (18 February 1917 – 24 March 1991) was a Dutch cyclist. He competed in the team pursuit event at the 1936 Summer Olympics.

== See also ==
- List of Dutch Olympic cyclists
