= Gerrit van Wees =

Dutch cyclist

Personal information
- Full name: Gerardus Jacobus van Wees
- Born: 26 January 1913 Heemstede, Netherlands
- Died: 5 May 1995 (aged 82) Hoofddorp, Netherlands

Cycling career
- Sport: Cycling
- Disciplines: Road cycling Track cycling cyclo-cross
- Role: Rider

Amateur team
- 1935–1937: Achilles

Gerardus Jacobus "Gerrit" van Wees (26 January 1913 – 5 May 1995) was a Dutch road, track and cyclo-cross cyclist.

== Career ==
Van Wees started cycling in 1934 on a borrowed bicycle but won local cycling competitions, becoming his local club champion.

In 1935 he won the season opening race in Heemstede, and afterwards also won the Heemstede-Brassard race, by winning all but one of the stages. Due to these results he was selected by the N. W. U. for the national track team pursuit team; riding his first race in Rijswijk against Germany.

He trained with the team, trained by Schelling, at the Olympic Stadium in Amsterdam. At the national trials in June 1936 in Heemstede the team had to compete against the "Olympic team" who trained in The Hague under Gerrit Bontekoe. During this team pursuit battle according to the newspaper report, Van Wees had a puncture halfway the race. However he continued with a flat tire and the team still won the race. He won with his team this period all other races where they competed in, in Amsterdam, Utrecht, Nijmegen and The Hague. He was officially selected for the 1936 Summer Olympics in July 1936.

He competed in the team pursuit event at the 1936 Summer Olympics. Van Wees also faced adversity during these Olympics. In the “easy” match against the United States they were ahead. However, almost when catching them two of his teammates fell during an unexpected (lane) change, and as a result they were eliminated. After the Olympics, he was honored during the Bennebroek Olympic day on 16 August 1936.

Later in August, he was honored for becoming 1936 National Club Champion on the track.

Van Wees announced his retirement from cycling in June 1937, due to "busy works". Van Wees carried out his work for two employers, and could not afford, according to himself, a severe fall, like a fall he had on Pentecost.

He became an honorary member of cycling club Achilles.

== See also ==
- List of Dutch Olympic cyclists
