= Bjørn Stiler =

Danish cyclist

Personal information
- Born: 24 July 1911 Copenhagen, Denmark
- Died: 30 March 1996 (aged 84) Glostrup, Denmark

Cycling career
- Sport: Cycling

Bjørn Stiler (24 July 1911 – 30 March 1996) was a Danish cyclist. He competed in the tandem event at the 1936 Summer Olympics.
