= Ferenc Pelvássy =

Hungarian cyclist

Personal information
- Born: 4 November 1910 Budapest, Hungary
- Died: 6 October 1980 (aged 69) Budapest, Hungary

Cycling career
- Sport: Cycling
- Discipline: Road
- Role: Rider

Ferenc Pelvássy (4 November 1910 – 6 October 1980) was a Hungarian road cyclist. He represented Hungary at the 1936 Summer Olympics in Berlin, competing in both the individual and team road race events.

Pelvássy was active in Hungarian competitive cycling during the 1930s and is best known for his participation in the 1936 Olympic Games. Ferenc Pelvássy (4 November 1910 – 6 October 1980) was a Hungarian cyclist. He competed in the tandem and team pursuit events at the 1936 Summer Olympics.
