= Carlo Legutti =

Italian cyclist

Personal information
- Born: 29 November 1912
- Died: 1 March 1985 (aged 72)

Cycling career
- Sport: Cycling

Carlo Legutti (29 November 1912 –1 March 1985) was an Italian cyclist. He competed in the tandem event at the 1936 Summer Olympics.
