= Alfred Mohr =

Austrian cyclist

Personal information
- Born: 21 January 1913 Vienna, Austria

Cycling career
- Sport: Cycling

Alfred Mohr (born 21 January 1913, date of death unknown) was an Austrian cyclist. He competed in the 1000m time trial and the tandem events at the 1936 Summer Olympics.
