= Walter Richli =

Swiss cyclist

Personal information
- Born: 28 April 1913 Zürich, Switzerland
- Died: 1944 (aged 30–31)

Cycling career
- Sport: Cycling

Walter Richli (28 April 1913 – 1944) was a Swiss cyclist. He competed in the team pursuit event at the 1936 Summer Olympics.
