= Roger Pirotte =

Belgian cyclist (1910–?)

Personal information
- Born: 31 March 1910

Cycling career
- Sport: Cycling

Roger Pirotte (born 31 March 1910, date of death unknown) was a Belgian cyclist. He competed in the tandem event at the 1936 Summer Olympics.
