= László Orczán =

Hungarian cyclist

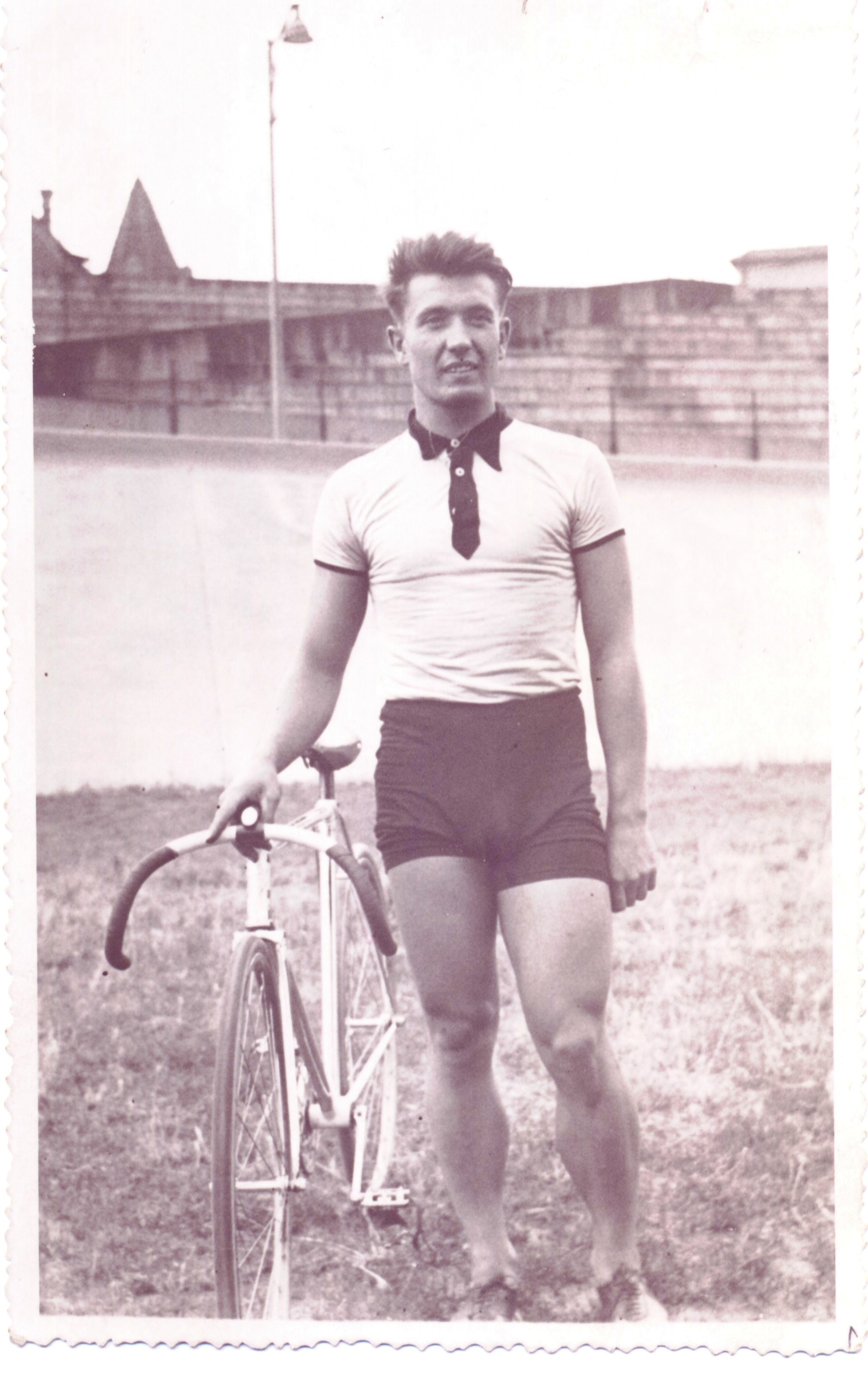

Personal information
- Born: 5 February 1912 Budapest, Hungary
- Died: 17 March 1992 (aged 80)

Cycling career
- Sport: Cycling

László Orczán (5 February 1912 – 17 March 1992) was a Hungarian cyclist. He competed in the 1000m time trial and team pursuit events at the 1936 Summer Olympics.
