= Bogdan Yanchev =

Bulgarian cyclist

Personal information
- Born: 26 February 1913

Cycling career
- Sport: Cycling

Bogdan Yanchev (Bulgarian: Богдан Янчев, born 26 February 1913, date of death unknown) was a Bulgarian cyclist. He competed in the team pursuit event at the 1936 Summer Olympics.
