= Boris Dimitrov =

Bulgarian cyclist

Personal information
- Born: 21 July 1912

Cycling career
- Sport: Cycling

Boris Dimitrov (Bulgarian: Борис Димитров, born 21 July 1912, date of death unknown) was a Bulgarian cyclist. He competed in the 1000m time trial event at the 1936 Summer Olympics.
