= Jean Alexandre (cyclist) =

Belgian cyclist

Personal information
- Born: 15 June 1917

Cycling career
- Sport: Cycling

Jean Alexandre (born 15 June 1917, date of death unknown) was a Belgian cyclist. He competed in the team pursuit event at the 1936 Summer Olympics.
