= Hans Christian Nielsen (cyclist) =

Danish cyclist

Personal information
- Born: 16 February 1916 Hovedstaden, Denmark
- Died: 28 November 2004 (aged 88) Hovedstaden, Denmark

Cycling career
- Sport: Cycling

Hans Christian Nielsen (16 February 1916 – 28 November 2004) was a Danish cyclist. He competed in the team pursuit event at the 1936 Summer Olympics.
