= Josef Genschieder =

Austrian cyclist

Personal information
- Born: 4 February 1915 Vienna, Austria
- Died: 3 April 1943 (aged 28) Volgograd, Soviet Union

Cycling career
- Sport: Cycling

Josef Genschieder (4 February 1915 – 3 April 1943) was an Austrian cyclist. He competed in the team pursuit event at the 1936 Summer Olympics. He was killed in action during World War II.
