= Sava Gerchev =

Bulgarian cyclist

Personal information
- Born: 22 January 1914

Cycling career
- Sport: Cycling

Sava Gerchev (Bulgarian: Сава Герчев, born 22 January 1914, date of death unknown) was a Bulgarian cyclist. He competed in the team pursuit event at the 1936 Summer Olympics.
