= Ernst Fuhrimann =

Swiss cyclist

Personal information
- Born: 28 June 1913

Cycling career
- Sport: Cycling

Ernst Fuhrimann (born 28 June 1913, date of death unknown) was a Swiss cyclist. He competed in the team pursuit event at the 1936 Summer Olympics.
