= William Logan (cyclist) =

American cyclist

Personal information
- Born: December 9, 1914 Hackettstown, New Jersey, United States
- Died: October 2, 2002 (aged 87) Belleville, New Jersey, United States

Cycling career
- Sport: Cycling

William Logan (December 9, 1914 – October 2, 2002) was an American cyclist. He competed in the tandem and team pursuit events at the 1936 Summer Olympics.
