= Karl Burkhart =

Swiss cyclist

Personal information
- Born: 10 May 1908
- Died: 1976 (aged 67–68)

Cycling career
- Sport: Cycling

Karl Burkhart (10 May 1908 – 1976) was a Swiss cyclist. He competed in the tandem event at the 1936 Summer Olympics.
