= Heino Dissing =

Danish cyclist

Personal information
- Born: 16 September 1912 Copenhagen, Denmark
- Died: 27 May 1990 (aged 77) Gladsaxe, Denmark

Cycling career
- Sport: Cycling

Heino Dissing (16 September 1912 – 27 May 1990) was a Danish cyclist. He competed in the tandem event at the 1936 Summer Olympics.
