= Roger-Jean Le Nizerhy =

French cyclist

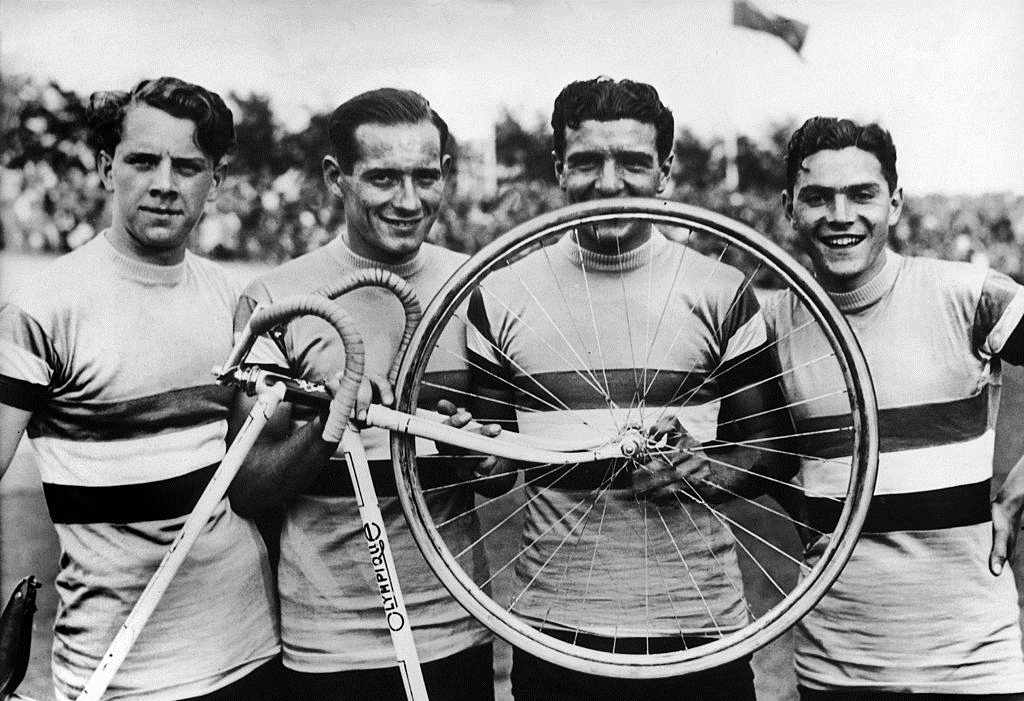
- Nizerhy (right) at the 1936 Olympics

Personal information
- Born: 3 December 1916 Paris, France
- Died: 28 January 1999 (aged 82) Créteil, France

Cycling career
- Sport: Cycling
Medal record
Representing FRA
Olympic Games
Gold medal – first place	1936 Berlin	4000m Team Pursuit

Roger-Jean Le Nizerhy (3 December 1916 – 28 January 1999) was a French cyclist who won a gold medal in the team pursuit at the 1936 Summer Olympics. In 1939 he turned professional and rode the 1949 Tour de France. He retired in 1952.
