= Tommy Wells (footballer) =

Australian rules footballer, born 1911

Personal information
- Full name: Tommy Wells
- Born: 13 May 1911
- Died: 22 November 1993 (aged 82)
- Original team: East Brunswick

Playing career^{1}
Years	Club	Games (Goals)
1932	Fitzroy	4 (1)
- ^{1} Playing statistics correct to the end of 1932.

Tommy Wells (13 May 1911 – 22 November 1993) was an Australian rules footballer who played with Fitzroy in the Victorian Football League (VFL).
