= Kevin Clarke (footballer, born 1932) =

Australian rules footballer

Personal information
- Full name: Kevin Clarke
- Born: 9 February 1932
- Died: 5 November 1993 (aged 61)
- Original team: Ivanhoe Amateurs
- Height: 183 cm (6 ft 0 in)
- Weight: 92 kg (203 lb)

Playing career^{1}
Years	Club	Games (Goals)
1953–54	Collingwood	18 (7)
- ^{1} Playing statistics correct to the end of 1954.

Kevin Clarke (9 February 1932 – 5 November 1993) was an Australian rules footballer who played with Collingwood in the Victorian Football League (VFL).
