= Heiner Hoffmann =

German cyclist

Personal information
- Born: 29 April 1915 Hesse, German Empire
- Died: 27 April 1945 (aged 29) Berlin, Germany

Cycling career
- Sport: Cycling

Heiner Hoffmann (29 April 1915 – 27 April 1945) was a German cyclist. He competed in the team pursuit event at the 1936 Summer Olympics. He was killed in action during World War II.
