= Mario Gentili (cyclist, born 1913) =

Italian cyclist (1913–1999)

Personal information
- Born: 31 January 1913 Prato, Italy
- Died: 19 April 1999 (aged 86)

Cycling career
- Sport: Cycling
Medal record
Representing ITA
Men's cycling
Olympic Games
| Silver medal – second place | 1936 Berlin | 4000m Team Pursuit |

Mario Gentili (31 January 1913 – 19 April 1999) was an Italian cyclist. He won the silver medal in Men's team pursuit at the 1936 Summer Olympics.
