= Karl Wölfl =

Austrian cyclist

Personal information
- Born: 5 January 1914
- Died: 29 November 2004 (aged 90)

Cycling career
- Sport: Cycling

Karl Wölfl (5 January 1914 – 29 November 2004) was an Austrian cyclist. He competed in the team pursuit event at the 1936 Summer Olympics.
