= Armando Latini =

Italian cyclist

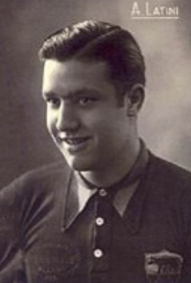

Personal information
- Born: 20 May 1913 Rome, Italy
- Died: 20 May 1966 (aged 53)

Cycling career
- Sport: Cycling
Medal record
Men's cycling
Representing ITA
Olympic Games
| Silver medal – second place | 1936 Berlin | 4000 m team pursuit |

Armando Latini (20 May 1913 – 20 May 1966) was an Italian track cyclist who won a silver medal in the 4 km team pursuit at the 1936 Olympics.
