= Fred Hansen (footballer) =

Australian rules footballer, born 1903

Personal information
- Full name: Frederick William Percy Hansen
- Born: 31 May 1903; South Melbourne, Victoria
- Died: 15 November 1993 (aged 90); Daw Park, South Australia
- Original team: Flinders Naval Base
- Height: 171 cm (5 ft 7 in)
- Weight: 73 kg (161 lb)

Playing career^{1}
Years	Club	Games (Goals)
1928	Footscray	1 (0)
1930	Hawthorn	1 (0)
Total		2 (0)
- ^{1} Playing statistics correct to the end of 1930.

Frederick William Percy Hansen (31 May 1903 – 15 November 1993) was an Australian rules footballer who played with Footscray and Hawthorn in the Victorian Football League (VFL).
