= Bianco Bianchi =

Italian cyclist (1917–1997)

Personal information
- Born: 6 April 1917 Quarrata, Italy
- Died: 17 July 1997 (aged 80) Livorno, Italy

Cycling career
- Sport: Cycling
Medal record
Men's cycling
Representing Italy
Olympic Games
| Silver medal – second place | 1936 Berlin | 4000m Team Pursuit |

Bianco Bianchi (6 April 1917 – 17 July 1997) was an Italian cyclist. He won the silver medal in Men's team pursuit at the 1936 Summer Olympics.
