= Marco Novaro =

Italian sailor

Marco Novaro (8 August 1912 – 29 November 1993) was an Italian sailor who competed in the 1960 Summer Olympics.
