= Cycling at the 1936 Summer Olympics – Men's tandem =

Cycling - Men's tandem at the Games of the XI Olympiad
- Venue: Olympic Cycling Stadium, Berlin
- Dates: 7–8 August 1936
- Competitors: 22 from 11 nations

Medalists
1st place, gold medalist(s)		Ernst Ihbe, Carl Lorenz; Germany
2nd place, silver medalist(s)		Bernard Leene, Hendrik Ooms; Netherlands
3rd place, bronze medalist(s)		Pierre Georget, Georges Maton; France

The men's tandem cycling event at the 1936 Summer Olympics took place on 7 and 8 August and was one of six events at the 1936 Olympics.

== Results ==
=== Round 1 ===
The winning pair of each heat advanced to the second round. The second-place and third-place pairs were relegated to the repechage for another chance at qualifying.

Heat 1

Rank	Name	Nation	Time	Notes
1	Frans Cools; Roger Pirotte	Belgium	11.4	Q
2	Heino Dissing; Bjørn Stiler	Denmark		R

Heat 2

Rank	Name	Nation	Time	Notes
1	Pierre Georget; Georges Maton	France	11.0	Q
2	Franz Dusika; Alfred Mohr	Austria		R

Heat 3

Rank	Name	Nation	Time	Notes
1	Bernard Leene; Hendrik Ooms	Netherlands	11.2	Q
2	Karl Burkhart; Fritz Ganz	Switzerland		R

Heat 4

Rank	Name	Nation	Time	Notes
1	Carlo Legutti; Bruno Loatti	Italy	11.6	Q
2	Ernest Chambers; John Sibbit	Great Britain		R

Heat 5

Rank	Name	Nation	Time	Notes
1	Ernst Ihbe; Carl Lorenz	Germany	11.6	Q
2	William Logan; Al Sellinger	United States		R
3	Miklós Németh; Ferenc Pelvássy	Hungary		R

==== Repechage ====
The winners of each repechage heat qualified for the second round. The losers were eliminated.

Repechage 1

Rank	Name	Nation	Time	Notes
1	Heino Dissing; Bjørn Stiler	Denmark	11.4	Q
2	Franz Dusika; Alfred Mohr	Austria		

Repechage 2

Rank	Name	Nation	Time	Notes
1	William Logan; Al Sellinger	United States	12.0	Q
2	Karl Burkhart; Fritz Ganz	Switzerland		

Repechage 3

Rank	Name	Nation	Time	Notes
1	Ernest Chambers; John Sibbit	Great Britain	–	Q
2	Miklós Németh; Ferenc Pelvássy	Hungary	DNS	

=== Round 2 ===
The winners of each heat advanced to the semifinals. The losers were eliminated.

Heat 1

Rank	Name	Nation	Time	Notes
1	Pierre Georget; Georges Maton	France	11.0	Q
2	Frans Cools; Roger Pirotte	Belgium		

Heat 2

Rank	Name	Nation	Time	Notes
1	Ernst Ihbe; Carl Lorenz	Germany	11.8	Q
2	Heino Dissing; Bjørn Stiler	Denmark		

Heat 3

Rank	Name	Nation	Time	Notes
1	Bernard Leene; Hendrik Ooms	Netherlands	11.2	Q
2	Ernest Chambers; John Sibbit	Great Britain		

Heat 4

Rank	Name	Nation	Time	Notes
1	Carlo Legutti; Bruno Loatti	Italy	11.0	Q
2	William Logan; Al Sellinger	United States		

=== Semifinals ===
The semifinal winners advanced to the gold medal final. The losers competed in a bronze medal final.

Semifinal 1

Rank	Name	Nation	Time	Notes
1	Ernst Ihbe; Carl Lorenz	Germany	11.4	Q
2	Pierre Georget; Georges Maton	France		B

Heat 2

Rank	Name	Nation	Time	Notes
1	Bernard Leene; Hendrik Ooms	Netherlands	11.4	Q
2	Carlo Legutti; Bruno Loatti	Italy		B

=== Finals ===
Both the gold and bronze medal finals were conducted as best-of-three competitions. In each case, the same team won both of the first two races, making a third race unnecessary.

Gold medal final

Rank	Name	Nation	Race 1	Race 2	Race 3	W	L
1st place, gold medalist(s)	Ernst Ihbe; Carl Lorenz	Germany	11.0	11.0	–	2	0
2nd place, silver medalist(s)	Bernard Leene; Hendrik Ooms	Netherlands			–	0	2

Bronze medal final

Rank	Name	Nation	Race 1	Race 2	Race 3	W	L
3rd place, bronze medalist(s)	Pierre Georget; Georges Maton	France	11.0	11.4	–	2	0
4	Carlo Legutti; Bruno Loatti	Italy			–	0	2
