= Harold Powell (footballer) =

Australian rules footballer, born 1915

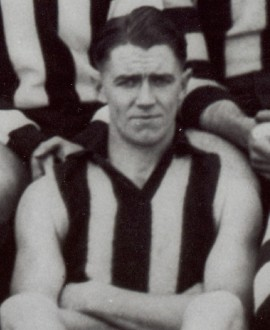
- Powell in 1939

Personal information
- Full name: Harold John Wellington Powell
- Born: 14 September 1915; Northcote, Victoria
- Died: 22 November 1993 (aged 78)
- Original team: Fairfield
- Height: 178 cm (5 ft 10 in)
- Weight: 75 kg (165 lb)

Playing career^{1}
Years	Club	Games (Goals)
1938–40	Collingwood	40 (41)
1941	Fitzroy	3 (3)
Total		43 (44)
- ^{1} Playing statistics correct to the end of 1941.

Harold John Wellington Powell (14 September 1915 – 22 November 1993) was an Australian rules footballer who played with Collingwood and Fitzroy in the Victorian Football League (VFL).

Powell later served in the Australian Army during World War II.
