= Pierre Georget =

French cyclist

Personal information
- Born: 9 August 1917 Châtellerault, France
- Died: 1 August 1964 (aged 46) Paris, France

Cycling career
- Sport: Cycling
Medal record
Representing FRA
Men's cycling
Olympic Games
Silver medal – second place	1936 Berlin	Time trial
Bronze medal – third place	1936 Berlin	Tandem

Pierre Georget (9 August 1917 – 1 August 1964) was a French cyclist. He won the silver medal in 1000m time trial and a bronze Medal in Men's Tandem at the 1936 Summer Olympics.
