= Hendrik Ooms =

Dutch cyclist (1916–1993)

Personal information
- Born: 18 March 1916 Halfweg, Netherlands
- Died: 6 December 1993 (aged 77) The Hague, Netherlands

Cycling career
- Sport: Cycling
Medal record
Representing NED
Men's cycling
Olympic Games
Silver medal – second place	1936 Berlin	Tandem

Hendrik Ooms also known as Henk Ooms (18 March 1916 – 6 December 1993) was a Dutch cyclist. He won a silver medal in Men's tandem at the 1936 Summer Olympics.

== See also ==
- List of Dutch Olympic cyclists
