= Georges Maton =

French cyclist

Personal information
- Born: 26 October 1913 Lille, France
- Died: 6 July 1998 (aged 84) Val-de-Marne, France

Cycling career
- Sport: Cycling
Medal record
Representing FRA
Men's cycling
Olympic Games
| Bronze medal – third place | 1936 Berlin | Tandem |

Georges Arnould Maton (26 October 1913 – 6 July 1998) was a French cyclist. He won a bronze medal in Men's Tandem at the 1936 Summer Olympics.
