= Jean Goujon (cyclist) =

French cyclist

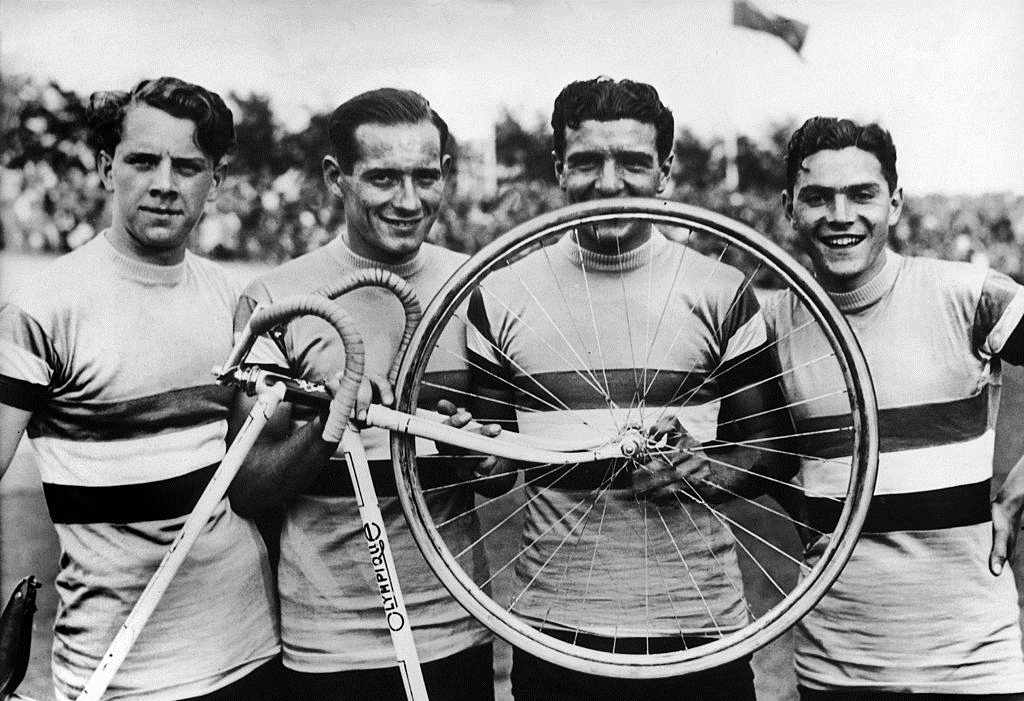
- Goujon (behind the wheel) at the 1936 Olympics

Personal information
- Born: 21 April 1914 Paris, France
- Died: 28 April 1991 (aged 77) Chaville, France

Cycling career
- Sport: Cycling
Medal record
Representing FRA
Men's cycling
Olympic Games
Gold medal – first place	1936 Berlin	Team pursuit

Jean Goujon (French pronunciation: [ʒɑ̃ ɡuʒɔ̃]; 21 April 1914 – 28 April 1991) was a French cyclist. He won the gold medal in team pursuit at the 1936 Summer Olympics. In 1937 he turned professional and rode the 1937 Tour de France. He retired in 1949.
