= Cor Boonstra =

Dutch businessman (1938–2025)

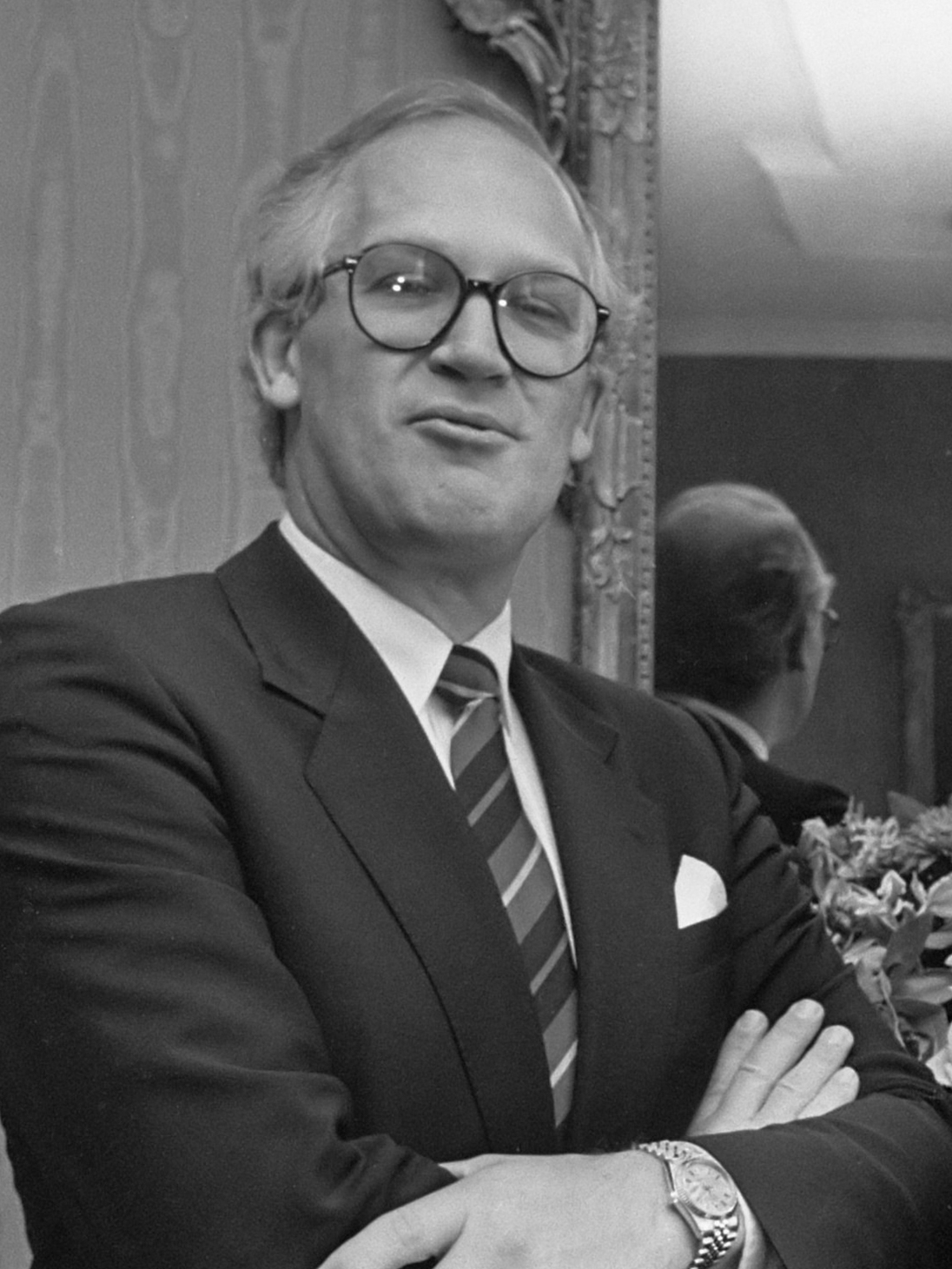
- Boonstra in 1986
- Born: 7 January 1938
- Died: 24 May 2025 (aged 87)
- Occupations: Businessman, chief executive
- Children: 2

Cor Boonstra (7 January 1938 – 23 May 2025) was a Dutch businessman and chief executive, mainly known for having been the president of the Board of Directors of Philips from 1996 to 2001.

== Life and career ==
At the age of 16, he quit his study at the Hogere burgerschool of his hometown and started to work for Unilever. In 1974 he started to work for Sara Lee, where he ultimately became the president of the board of directors.

On 31 December 1993, he withdrew from Sara Lee. In the beginning of 1994, he was asked by former Philips top executive Jan Timmer to participate in the Board of Directors of Philips, to breathe new life to the brand Philips. Boonstra was responsible for the 'Let's make things better' campaign.

Two years after his commencement of employment with Philips, Boonstra became the successor of Timmer as the president of the board of directors. He held this leading position until 2001. While Boonstra was in charge, the market-value of Philips increased fivefold mainly by focusing on short-term profits and selling off company units like BSO/Origin (now a part of Atos and record company PolyGram. During his leadership he moved the head office (the top 350 employees) of Philips from Eindhoven to Amsterdam, the capital of the country. Since most of the regular staff remained in Eindhoven, the birthplace of the company, this move was not popular among Philips employees. In 2000, Boonstra was chosen 'top executive of the year'. Boonstra divorced two times and had two children (Cor Boonstra and Roelof Boonstra) of his first wife.

In 1998, Boonstra and his first wife barely survived a hijacking. At that time, Boonstra already was having an affair with Sylvia Tóth. A few years later, Boonstra was accused of insider trading in which he allegedly earned several hundreds of thousands of euros by trading in Endemol shares (where Sylvia Tóth was a member of the board) just before that company was acquired by the Spanish Telefónica. Boonstra was ultimately acquitted in court as no hard evidence existed that his partner Tóth had shared the information on the impending deal with him. The Dutch press referred to the inside deal as the "pillow talk deal".

A few months later, Cor Boonstra was again charged for not reporting trading in Ahold shares where he himself was a member of the board. He was found guilty and charged a 135.000 euro fine.

Boonstra died on 24 May 2025, at the age of 87.

== Additional references ==
- Encyclopedia, Dutch Wikipedia, Article Cor Boonstra, User Falcongj, added 2 January 2004, last edit 4 April 2009
