= Rudolf Karsch =

German cyclist (1913–1950)

Personal information
- Born: 26 December 1913 Leipzig, German Empire
- Died: 10 December 1950 (aged 36) Erfurt, East Germany

Cycling career
- Sport: Cycling
Medal record
Representing Germany
Men's cycling
Olympic Games
Bronze medal – third place	1936 Berlin	Time trial

Rudolf Karsch (26 December 1913 – 10 December 1950) was a German cyclist. He won the bronze medal in 1000m time trial at the 1936 Summer Olympics.
