= Tjabel Boonstra =

Dutch cyclist (1899–1968)

Personal information
- Born: 4 June 1899 Assen, Netherlands
- Died: 18 May 1968 (aged 68) Amsterdam, Netherlands

Cycling career
- Sport: Cycling

Tjabel Boonstra (4 June 1899 – 18 May 1968) was a Dutch cyclist. He competed in two events at the 1920 Summer Olympics.

== See also ==
- List of Dutch Olympic cyclists
