= Edy Baumann =

Swiss cyclist

Personal information
- Born: 12 July 1914
- Died: 27 November 1993 (aged 79) Zurich, Switzerland

Cycling career
- Sport: Cycling

Edy Baumann (12 July 1914 – 27 November 1993) was a Swiss cyclist. He competed in the 1000m time trial event at the 1936 Summer Olympics.
