= Georgi Velinov (cyclist) =

Bulgarian cyclist

Personal information
- Born: 23 January 1912

Cycling career
- Sport: Cycling

Georgi Velinov (Bulgarian: Георги Велинов, born 23 January 1912, date of death unknown) was a Bulgarian cyclist. He competed in the team pursuit event at the 1936 Summer Olympics.
