= Ernst Ihbe =

German cyclist (1913–1992)

Personal information
- Born: 20 December 1913 Erlbach, German Empire
- Died: 30 August 1992 (aged 78) Leipzig, Germany

Cycling career
- Sport: Cycling
Medal record
Men's cycling
Representing Germany
Olympic Games
Gold medal – first place	1936 Berlin	Tandem

Ernst Ihbe (20 December 1913 – 30 August 1992) was a German cyclist. He won the gold medal in Men's tandem at the 1936 Summer Olympics.
