= Harry Hill (cyclist) =

English racing cyclist (1916–2009)

Personal information
- Born: 8 May 1916 Padiham, Lancashire, England
- Died: 31 January 2009 (aged 92) Bury, Greater Manchester, England

Cycling career
- Sport: Cycling
Medal record
Representing GBR
Men's cycling
Olympic Games
Bronze medal – third place	1936 Berlin	4000m Team Pursuit

Harry Heaton Hill (8 May 1916 – 31 January 2009) was a British cyclist who competed in the Olympic Games in 1936. He won the bronze medal in the 4000m team pursuit in Berlin with Ernest Mills, Ernest Johnson, and Charles King.

Born in Padiham, Hill never met his father, who died during World War I in Africa, and he was raised by his mother in Sheffield. Too poor to get to London any other way, Hill cycled the 200 miles using the bike he planned to ride during the Olympic Games.

Upon returning to Britain after the Olympics, Hill bicycled 170 miles towards his hometown. Having bought an Olympic souvenir jacket, he had no money for food and, weak from hunger, hitched a ride for the last 30 miles. After winning the bronze medal, Hill became the first person to cycle 25 miles in an hour on an outdoor track, in Milan in 1937. He was to compete at 1939 world track championships but they were cancelled due to World War II. During the conflict, he built submarines in Barrow and, afterwards, ran a garage shop in Radcliffe, Greater Manchester. At 60, he cycled across North America.

Hill, a father of five children, claimed never to have smoked or to have drunk alcohol and, until 2004 when he fractured his hip in a fall in Spain, he had biked every day since he was 13. On 23 March 2005 he attended a reception headed by Queen Elizabeth II honouring 100 years of the British Olympic Association. He died of pneumonia on 31 January 2009, at the age of 92.
