= Heinz Hasselberg =

German cyclist

Personal information
- Born: 19 January 1914 Bochum, German Empire
- Died: 31 May 1989 (aged 75) Bochum, West Germany

Cycling career
- Sport: Cycling

Heinz Hasselberg (19 January 1914 – 31 May 1989) was a German cyclist. He competed in the team pursuit event at the 1936 Summer Olympics.
