= Arthur Clements =

Australian rules footballer

Personal information
- Full name: Arthur Clements
- Born: 22 January 1921
- Died: 12 November 1993 (aged 72)
- Height: 166 cm (5 ft 5 in)
- Weight: 68 kg (150 lb)

Playing career^{1}
Years	Club	Games (Goals)
1943	Hawthorn	3 (2)
- ^{1} Playing statistics correct to the end of 1943.

Arthur Clements (22 January 1921 – 12 November 1993) was an Australian rules footballer who played for the Hawthorn Football Club in the Victorian Football League (VFL).
