= Cycling at the 1936 Summer Olympics – Men's track time trial =

Cycling – Men's track time trial at the Games of the XI Olympiad
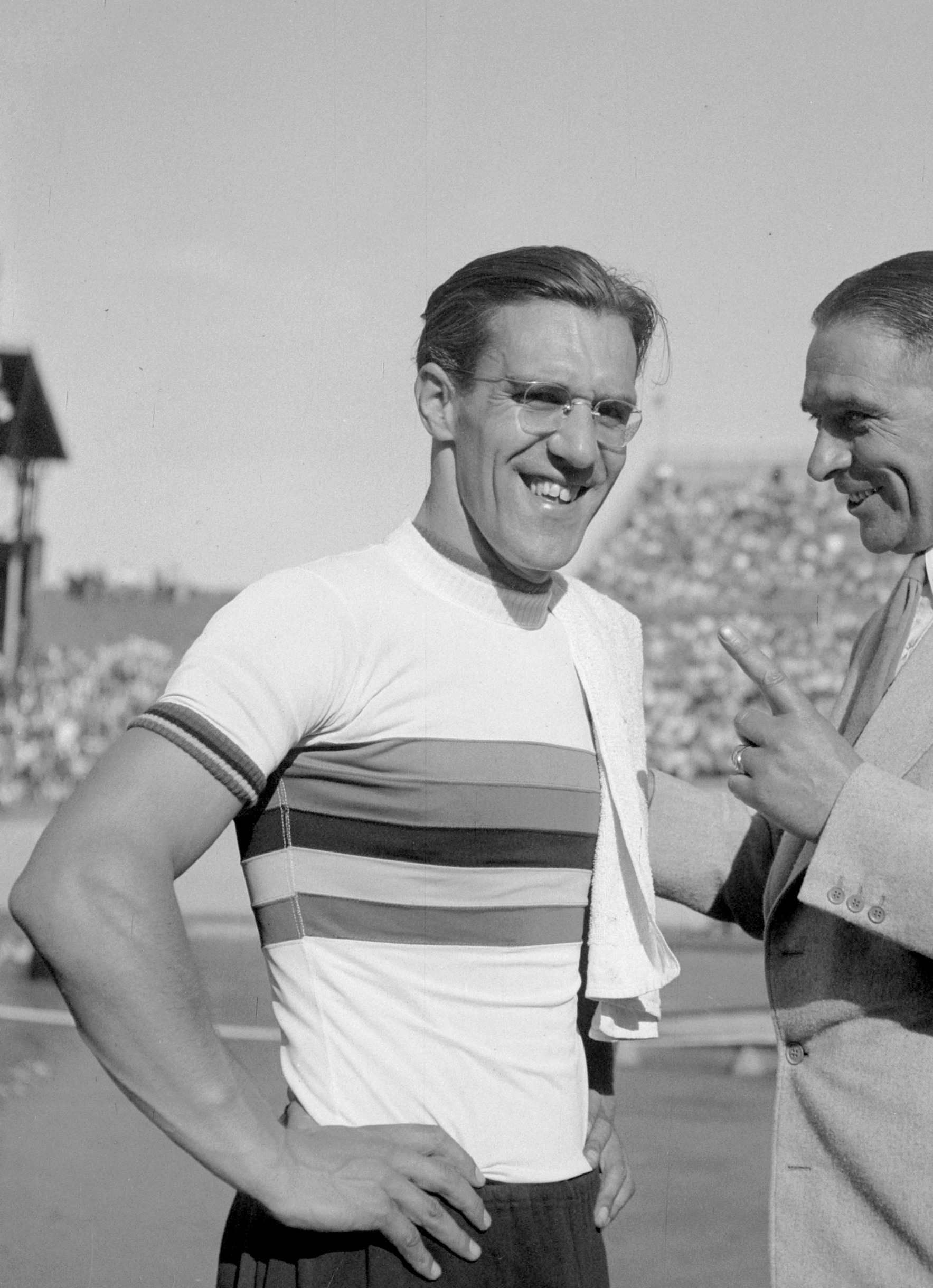
- Arie van Vliet (1948)
- Venue: Olympic Cycling Stadium, Berlin
- Date: 8 August 1936
- Competitors: 19 from 19 nations
- Winning time: 1:12.0 OR

Medalists
1st place, gold medalist(s)		Arie van Vliet; Netherlands
2nd place, silver medalist(s)		Pierre Georget; France
3rd place, bronze medalist(s)		Rudolf Karsch; Germany

The men's track time trial cycling event at the 1936 Summer Olympics took place on 8 August and was one of six events at the 1936 Olympics. Nineteen cyclists from 19 nations competed, with each nation limited to one competitor. The event was won by Arie van Vliet of the Netherlands, the nation's first victory in the men's track time trial after two consecutive silver medals in 1924 and 1928. Pierre Georget's silver put France on the podium for the third time. Germany earned its first medal in the event with Rudolf Karsch's bronze.

== Background ==
This was the fourth appearance of the event, which had previously been held in 1896 and every Games since 1928. It would be held every Games until being dropped from the programme after 2004. None of the cyclists from 1932 returned. Arie van Vliet of the Netherlands was the favorite; he had come in second in the sprint at the 1934 and 1935 World Championships and (the day before this competition) the 1936 Games. The sprint winner, Toni Merkens, was not competing in the time trial, however.

Bulgaria, Finland, Hungary, New Zealand, Norway, South Africa, and Sweden each made their debut in the men's track time trial. France and Great Britain each made their fourth appearance, having competed at every appearance of the event.

== Competition format ==
The event was a time trial on the track, with each cyclist competing separately to attempt to achieve the fastest time. Each cyclist raced one kilometre from a standing start.

== Records ==
The following was the Olympic record prior to the competition.

World record	Unknown	Unknown^{*}	Unknown	Unknown
Olympic record	Dunc Gray (AUS)	1:13.0	Los Angeles, United States	1 August 1932

^{*} World records were not tracked by the UCI until 1949.

Arie van Vliet set the new Olympic record at 1:12.0. Pierre Georget also beat the old record.

== Schedule ==
Date	Time	Round
Saturday, 8 August 1936	16:00	Final

== Results ==
Dimitrov withdrew "owing to bicycle defect."

Rank	Cyclist	Nation	Time	Notes
1st place, gold medalist(s)	Arie van Vliet	Netherlands	1:12.0	OR
2nd place, silver medalist(s)	Pierre Georget	France	1:12.8	
3rd place, bronze medalist(s)	Rudolf Karsch	Germany	1:13.2	
4	Benedetto Pola	Italy	1:13.6	
5	Arne Pedersen	Denmark	1:14.0	
5	László Orczán	Hungary	1:14.0	
7	Ray Hicks	Great Britain	1:14.8	
8	George Giles	New Zealand	1:15.0	
8	Edy Baumann	Switzerland	1:15.0	
10	Al Sellinger	United States	1:15.2	
11	Tassy Johnson	Australia	1:15.8	
12	Frans Cools	Belgium	1:16.0	
13	Alfred Mohr	Austria	1:16.4	
14	Harry Haraldsen	Norway	1:16.8	
15	Bob McLeod	Canada	1:17.0	
15	Ted Clayton	South Africa	1:17.0	
17	Jonas Persson	Sweden	1:17.2	
18	Thor Porko	Finland	1:18.2	
—	Boris Dimitrov	Bulgaria	DNF	
