= Roman Durniok =

Polish footballer (1928–1993)

Personal information
- Date of birth: 17 February 1928
- Place of birth: Chorzów, German Empire
- Date of death: 25 November 1993 (aged 65)
- Place of death: Kraków, Poland
- Height: 1.74 m (5 ft 9 in)
- Position: Defender

Youth career
- Kresy Chorzów

Senior career*
Years	Team	Apps	(Gls)
1947–1949	AKS Chorzów		
1950–1952	Wawel Kraków		
1953–1954	Budowlani Chorzów		
1955–1958	Wawel Kraków		
1959–1963	Cracovia		

International career
1953–1954	Poland	4	(0)

Managerial career
- 1967: Cracovia
- 1971: GKS Katowice
- 1974–1975: Cracovia
- 1982–1983: Wisła Kraków
- 1983–1984: Szombierki Bytom
- 1984: Cracovia
- * Club domestic league appearances and goals

Roman Durniok (17 February 1928 – 25 November 1993) was a Polish manager and player.
