= Carl Lorenz =

German cyclist (1913–1993)

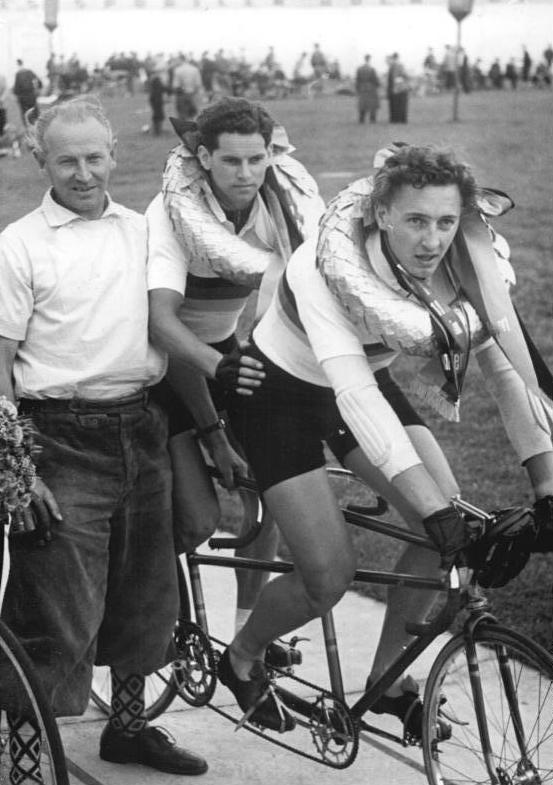
- Bundesarchiv Bild 183-39839-0003, Nietschke, Joachim Popke

Personal information
- Born: 27 November 1913 Chemnitz, German Empire
- Died: 25 November 1993 (aged 79) Berlin, Germany

Cycling career
- Sport: Cycling
Medal record
Men's cycling
Representing Germany
Olympic Games
Gold medal – first place	1936 Berlin	Tandem

Carl Lorenz (27 November 1913 – 25 November 1993) was a German cyclist. He won the gold medal in Men's tandem at the 1936 Summer Olympics.
