= Erich Arndt (cyclist) =

German cyclist

Personal information
- Born: 26 August 1911 Krefeld, Germany
- Died: 6 March 1961 (aged 49)

Cycling career
- Sport: Cycling

Erich Arndt (26 August 1911 – 6 March 1961) was a German cyclist. He competed in the team pursuit event at the 1936 Summer Olympics.
