= Ernest Johnson (cyclist) =

English cyclist (1912–1997)

Personal information
- Born: 18 November 1912 Putney, London, England
- Died: 29 November 1997 (aged 85) Kingsbridge, Devon, England

Cycling career
- Sport: Cycling
Medal record
Representing GBR
Men's cycling
Olympic Games
Bronze medal – third place	1932 Los Angeles	Team pursuit
Bronze medal – third place	1936 Berlin	Team pursuit

Ernest Alfred Johnson (18 November 1912 – 29 November 1997) was a British track cyclist who competed in the 1932 Summer Olympics and in the 1936 Summer Olympics. He was born in Putney, London and died in Kingsbridge, Devon.

He won two bronze medals with the British pursuit team in 1932 and 1936.
