= Football at the 1936 Summer Olympics – Men's team squads =

The following squads were named for the 1936 Summer Olympics tournament.

== Austria ==
Head coach: (England) James Hogan

Pos.	Player	DoB	Age	Caps	Club	Tournament games	Tournament goals	Minutes played	Sub off	Sub on	Cards yellow/red
FW	Franz Fuchsberger	28 Sep 1910	25	?	(Austria) SV Urfahr	4	0	420	-	-
FW	Max Hofmeister	22 Mar 1913	23	?	(Austria) WSV Donawitz	4	0	420	-	-
GK	Eduard Kainberger	20 Nov 1911	24	?	(Austria) Salzburger AK 1914	4	0	420	-	-
FW	Karl Kainberger	1 Dec 1912	23	?	(Austria) Salzburger AK 1914	2	2	210	-	-
DF	Martin Kargl	30 Dec 1912	23	?	(Austria) SC Kores, Wien	4	0	420	-	-
FW	Josef Kitzmüller	21 Jun 1912	24	?	(Austria) SK Admira, Linz	2	0	210	-	-
MF	Anton Krenn	18 Apr 1911	25	?	(Austria) Polizei SV, Wien	4	0	420	-	-
DF	Ernst Künz	23 Feb 1912	24	?	(Austria) FC Lustenau 07	4	0	420	-	-
FW	Adolf Laudon	13 Dec 1912	23	?	(Austria) Salzburger AK 1914	4	2	420	-	-
FW	Franz Mandl	4 Aug 1916	19	?	(Austria) First Vienna FC	1	1	90	-	-
FW	Klement Steinmetz	23 Mar 1915	21	?	(Austria) Kapfenberger SV	3	3	330	-	-
MF	Karl Wahlmüller	22 Oct 1913	22	?	(Austria) SV Urfahr	4	0	420	-	-
FW	Walter Werginz	18 Feb 1913	23	?	(Austria) Klagenfurter AC	4	1	420	-	-
	Stand-by players -
MF	Ernst Bacher	23 Aug 1909	26	?	(Austria) Salzburger AK 1914	0	0	0	-	-	-
FW	Alois Homschak			?	(Austria) WSV Donawitz	0	0	0	-	-	-
FW	Anton Kleindienst			?	(Austria) Kapfenberger SV	0	0	0	-	-	-
MF	Josef Ksander			?	(Austria) 1. Simmeringer SC	0	0	0	-	-	-
GK	Josef Lagofsky			?	(Austria) Heeres SV, Wien	0	0	0	-	-	-
DF	Leo Schaffelhofer	13 Apr 1906	30	?	(Austria) Linzer ASK	0	0	0	-	-	-
FW	Karl Schreiber			?	(Austria) SC Rapid Oberlaa	0	0	0	-	-	-

== China ==
Head coach: Ngan Shing Kwan

No.	Pos.	Player	Date of birth (age)	Caps	Club
1	GK	Bao Jiaping (包家平)	10 August 1908 (aged 27)		(Hong Kong) South China B
2	DF	Tam Kong Pak (譚江柏)	27 December 1911 (aged 24)		(Hong Kong) South China A
3	DF	Li Tiansheng (李天生)	4 April 1906 (aged 30)		(Hong Kong) South China A
4	MF	Chen Zhenhe (陳鎮和)	15 March 1906 (aged 30)		(Republic of China (1912–1949)) Three Clutures^{1}
5	MF	Huang Meishun (黃美順)	6 November 1907 (aged 28)		(Hong Kong) South China A
6	MF	Xu Yahui (徐亞輝)	10 October 1912 (aged 23)		(Hong Kong) Chinese Athletic
7	FW	Ye Beihua (葉北華)	2 February 1907 (aged 29)		(Hong Kong) South China A
8	FW	Suen Kam Shun (孫錦順)	4 July 1907 (aged 29)		(Republic of China (1912–1949)) Tung Hwa
9	FW	Lee Wai Tong (李惠堂) (c)	16 October 1905 (aged 30)		(Hong Kong) South China A
10	FW	Fung King Cheong (馮景祥)	19 December 1907 (aged 28)		(Hong Kong) South China A
11	FW	Cao Guicheng (曹桂成)	15 June 1911 (aged 25)		(Hong Kong) South China A
12	GK	Liang Shue-tang (黃紀良)	31 December 1911 (aged 24)		(Hong Kong) South China A
13	DF	Mak Sui Hon (麥紹漢)			(Hong Kong) Chinese Athletic
14	DF	Chua Boon Lay (蔡文禮)			(Straits Settlements) S.C.F.A.
15	MF	Leung Wing Chui (梁榮照)			(Hong Kong) South China A
16	MF	S. D. Liang (梁樹棠)			(Republic of China (1912–1949)) Three Clutures^{1}
17	MF	Lee Kwok Wai (李國威)			(Hong Kong) South China A
18	FW	K. L. Kia (賈幼良)			(Republic of China (1912–1949)) Tung Hwa
19	FW	Tio Hian Goan (張顯元)			(Dutch East Indies) Tiong Hoa Soerabaja
20	FW	Cheuk Shek Kam (卓石金)			(Hong Kong) Chinese Athletic
21	FW	Tay Qua Liang (鄭季良)			(Hong Kong) South China A
22	FW	Yeung Shui Yick (楊水益)			(Hong Kong) South China B

^{1}This English club name is from The Little Red Book of Chinese Football, written by Dave Twydell. The correct name of the club at that time should be "You-you" (Chinese: 優游).

== Egypt ==
Head coach: (England) Booth

Pos.	Player	DoB	Age	Caps	Club	Tournament games	Tournament goals	Minutes played	Sub off	Sub on	Cards yellow/red
MF	Hassan El-Far	21 May 1912	24		(Egypt) Zamalek SC	1	0	90	-	-
MF	Wagih El-Kashef	5 Feb 1909	27	?	(Egypt) Al Ahly	1	0	90	-	-
DF	Ali El-Kaf	15 Jun 1906	30	?	(Egypt) Zamalek SC	1	0	90	-	-
DF	Ahmed Halim	10 Feb 1910	26	?	(Egypt) Zamalek SC	1	0	90	-	-
FW	Mohamed Latif	23 Oct 1909	26	?	(Scotland) Rangers F.C.	1	0	90	-	-
FW	Labib Mahmoud	25 Aug 1907	28	?	(Egypt) Al Ahly	1	0	90	-	-
GK	Mustafa Mansour	2 Aug 1914	22	?	(Egypt) Al Ahly	1	0	90	-	-
FW	Mokhtar El-Tetsh	12 Oct 1905	30	?	(Egypt) Al Ahly	1	0	90	-	-
MF	Helmi Moustafa	11 June 1911	25	?	(Egypt) Zamalek SC	1	0	90	-	-
FW	Abdel-Karim Sakr	8 Nov 1918	17	?	(Egypt) Zamalek SC	1	1	90	-	-
FW	Mostafa Taha	23 Mar 1910	26	?	(Egypt) Zamalek SC	1	0	90	-	-
	Stand-by players -
GK	Hussein Ezzat	1915	21	?	(Egypt)	0	0	0	-	-	-
DF	Abdel-Hamid Ibrahim	20 Dec 1905	30	?	(Egypt) El-Olympi	0	0	0	-	-	-
MF	Ali Shafi	10 April 1908	28	?	(Egypt) Zamalek SC	0	0	0	-	-	-
FW	Hassan Abdin	20 Jan 1910	26	?	(Egypt) Al-Ittihad Al-Sakandary	0	0	0	-	-	-
FW	Hussein Hamdi	6 Mar 1905	31	?	(Egypt)	0	0	0	-	-	-
DF	Omar Shendi	1915	21	?	(Egypt) Zamalek SC	0	0	0	-	-	-
MF	Mohammed Hassan Helmy	13 Feb 1912	24	?	(Egypt) Zamalek SC	0	0	0	-	-	-

== Finland ==
Head coach: (Germany) Ferdinand Fabra

Pos.	Player	DoB	Age	Caps	Club	Tournament games	Tournament goals	Minutes played	Sub off	Sub on	Cards yellow/red
FW	Ernst Grönlund	18 Dec 1902	33	?	(Finland) HIFK	1	1	90	-	-
FW	Erkki Gustafsson	31 Dec 1912	23	?	(Finland) HT Helsinki	1	0	90	-	-
MF	William Kanerva	26 Nov 1902	33	?	(Finland) Helsingin Palloseura	1	1	90	-	-
DF	Frans Karjagin	12 Jun 1909	27	?	(Finland) HIFK	1	0	90	-	-
MF	Eino Lahti	18 May 1915	21	?	(Finland) Vaasan Palloseura	1	0	90	-	-
FW	Pentti Larvo	22 Dec 1907	28	?	(Finland) Helsingin Palloseura	1	1	90	-	-
FW	Aatos Lehtonen	15 Feb 1914	22	?	(Finland) HJK Helsinki	1	0	90	-	-
MF	Jarl Malmgren	12 Sep 1908	27	?	(Finland) HIFK	1	0	90	-	-
DF	Arvo Närvänen	12 Feb 1905	31	?	(Finland) Sudet Viipuri	1	0	90	-	-
GK	Paavo Salminen	19 Nov 1911	24	?	(Finland) HT Helsinki	1	0	90	-	-
FW	Kurt Weckström	4 Dec 1911	24	?	(Finland) HJK Helsinki	1	0	90	-	-
	Stand-by players -
GK	Viljo Halme	24 Jan 1907	29	?	(Finland) HJK Helsinki	0	0	0	-	-	-
DF	Ragnar Lindbäck	13 Nov 1906	29	?	(Finland) HIFK	0	0	0	-	-	-
MF	Tauno Paakkanen	8 Mar 1911	25	?	(Finland) Sudet Viipuri	0	0	0	-	-	-
MF	Armas Pyy	27 May 1913	23	?	(Finland) HJK Helsinki	0	0	0	-	-	-
FW	Yrjö Sotiola	19 May 1913	23	?	(Finland) Helsingin Palloseura	0	0	0	-	-	-

Sixteen players competed at the Olympics. The formal application also included five other players who did not travel to Berlin: Veli Leskinen (HT Helsinki), Eino Virtanen (Helsingin PS), Eino Kilpi (Helsingin PS), Yrjö Kylmälä (HT Helsinki), and Arvo Hyyrynen (Sudet Viipuri).

== Germany ==
Head coach: Otto Nerz

Pos.	Player	DoB	Age	Caps	Club	Tournament games	Tournament goals	Minutes played	Sub off	Sub on	Cards yellow/red
DF	Robert Bernard	13 Mar 1913	23	?	(Germany) VfR Schweinfurt	2	0	180	-	-
GK	Fritz Buchloh	26 Nov 1909	26	?	(Germany) VfB Speldorf	1	0	90	-	-
MF	Heinz Ditgens	14 Jul 1914	22	?	(Germany) Borussia Mönchengladbach	2	0	180	-	-
FW	Franz Elbern	1 Nov 1910	25	?	(Germany) SV Beuel 06	1	1	90	-	-
FW	Josef Gauchel	11 Sep 1916	19	?	(Germany) TuS Neuendorf	1	2	90	-	-
DF	Ludwig Goldbrunner	5 Mar 1908	28	?	(Germany) FC Bayern Munich	2	0	180	-	-
MF	Rudolf Gramlich	6 Jun 1908	28	?	(Germany) Eintracht Frankfurt	1	0	90	-	-
MF	Karl Hohmann	18 Jun 1908	28	?	(Germany) VfL Benrath	1	0	90	-	-
GK	Hans Jakob	16 Jun 1908	28	?	(Germany) Jahn Regensburg	1	0	90	-	-
FW	Ernst Lehner	7 Nov 1912	23	?	(Germany) Schwaben Augsburg	1	0	90	-	-
FW	August Lenz	29 Nov 1910	25	?	(Germany) Borussia Dortmund	1	0	90	-	-
MF	Paul Mehl	16 Apr 1912	24	?	(Germany) Fortuna Düsseldorf	1	0	90	-	-
DF	Reinhold Münzenberg	25 Jan 1909	27	?	(Germany) Alemannia Aachen	2	0	180	-	-
FW	Otto Siffling	3 Aug 1912	24	?	(Germany) SV Waldhof Mannheim	1	0	90	-	-
FW	Wilhelm Simetsreiter	16 Mar 1915	21	?	(Germany) FC Bayern Munich	2	3	180	-	-
FW	Adolf Urban	3 Jan 1914	22	?	(Germany) FC Schalke 04	2	3	180	-	-
	Stand-by players -
FW	Rudolf Gellesch	1 May 1914	22	?	(Germany) FC Schalke 04	0	0	0	-	-	-
DF	Paul Janes	10 Mar 1912	24	?	(Germany) Fortuna Düsseldorf	0	0	0	-	-	-
DF	Andreas Munkert	7 Mar 1908	28	?	(Germany) 1. FC Nürnberg	0	0	0	-	-	-
DF	Wilhelm Sold	19 Apr 1911	25	?	(Germany) FV Saarbrücken	0	0	0	-	-	-
FW	Jakob Eckert	18 Oct 1916	19	?	(Germany) Wormatia Worms	0	0	0	0	-	-	-
GK	Willy Jürissen	13 May 1912	24	?	(Germany) Rot-Weiß Oberhausen	0	0	0	-	-	-

== Great Britain ==
Head coach: William Voisey

Pos.	Player	DoB	Age	Caps	Club	Tournament games	Tournament goals	Minutes played	Sub off	Sub on	Cards yellow/red
FW	Bertram Clements	1 Dec 1913	22	?	(England) Casuals FC	1	1	90	-	-
FW	James Crawford	21 May 1904	32	?	(Scotland) Queen's Park FC	2	0	180	-	-
FW	John Dodds	10 Jan 1907	29	?	(Scotland) Queen's Park FC	1	1	90	-	-
FW	Maurice Edelston	27 Apr 1918	18	?	(England) Wimbledon FC	1	0	90	-	-
FW	Lester Finch	26 Aug 1909	26	?	(England) Barnet FC	2	1	180	-	-
DF	Robert Fulton	6 Nov 1906	29	?	(Northern Ireland) Belfast Celtic FC	2	0	180	-	-
MF	John Gardiner	23 Dec 1911	24	?	(Scotland) Queen's Park FC	2	0	180	-	-
GK	Haydn Hill	4 Jul 1913	23	?	(England) Yorkshire Amateur AFC	2	0	180	-	-
DF	Guy Holmes	1 Dec 1905	30	?	(England) Ilford FC	2	0	90	-	-
MF	Bernard Joy	29 Oct 1911	24	?	(England) Casuals FC	2	2	180	-	-
FW	Joseph Kyle	16 Oct 1913	22	?	(Scotland) Queen's Park FC	1	0	90	-	-
MF	Daniel Pettit	19 Feb 1915	21	?	(England) Cambridge University AFC	1	0	90	-	-
FW	Frederick Riley	9 Jan 1912	24	?	(England) Casuals FC	1	0	90	-	-
MF	John Sutcliffe	27 Jun 1913	23	?	(England) Corinthian FC	1	0	90	-	-
FW	Edgar Shearer	6 Jun 1909	27	?	(England) Corinthian FC	1	1	90	-	-
	Stand-by players -
FW	Coventry Brown	28 Feb 1910	26	?	(England) Royal Air Force F.A.	0	0	0	-	-	-
MF	Stan Eastham	26 Nov 1913	22	?	(England) Army F.A.	0	0	0	-	-	-
MF	Ifor Fielding	16 Jun 1909	27	?	(England) Royal Navy F.A.	0	0	0	-	-	-
FW	Jimmy Gibb	6 May 1912	24	?	(Northern Ireland) Cliftonville F.C.	0	0	0	-	-	-
GK	Terry Huddle	13 Apr 1911	25	?	(England) Casuals FC	0	0	0	-	-	-
DF	Bill Peart	1 Sep 1904	31	?	(England) Royal Navy F.A.	0	0	0	-	-	-
DF	Gilbert Roylance	13 Apr 1909	27	?	(England) Yorkshire Amateur AFC	0	0	0	-	-	-

== Hungary ==
Head coach: Zoltán Opata

Pos.	Player	DoB	Age	Caps	Club	Tournament games	Tournament goals	Minutes played	Sub off	Sub on	Cards yellow/red
FW	András Bérczes	5 Nov 1909	26	?	(Hungary) Pécsi VSK	1	0	90	-	-
DF	József Berta	25 Oct 1912	23	?	(Hungary) Tokodi ÜSC	1	0	90	-	-
MF	Lajos Bonyhai	29 Jun 1913	23	?	(Hungary) Miskolci Attila	1	0	90	-	-
MF	Mihály Csutorás	7 Mar 1912	24	?	(Hungary) Herminamezei AC	1	0	90	-	-
FW	Lipót Kállai	27 Dec 1912	23	?	(Hungary) Újpesti TE	1	0	90	-	-
MF	Gyula Király	28 Oct 1908	27	?	(Hungary) BSZKRT	1	0	90	-	-
FW	Gyula Kiss	14 May 1916	20	?	(Hungary) Ferencvárosi TC	1	0	90	-	-
DF	Kálmán Kovács	30 Apr 1912	24	?	(Hungary) Szegedi Kolozsvári Egyetemi AC	1	0	90	-	-
MF	Pál Lágler	8 Oct 1913	22	?	(Hungary) Magyar Pamutipari Sport Club	1	0	90	-	-
GK	László Régi	13 May 1911	25	?	(Hungary) BSZKRT	1	0	90	-	-
FW	József Soproni	26 Jan 1913	23	?	(Hungary) Soproni AC	1	0	90	-	-
	Stand-by players -
MF	István Beer	28 Aug 1914	21	?	(Hungary) Budafoki MTE	0	0	0	-	-	-
MF	György Honti			?	(Hungary) Pécsi VSK	0	0	0	-	-	-
DF	Gyula Horváth			?	(Hungary) Törekvés SE	0	0	0	-	-	-
FW	László Keszei	28 Dec 1911	24	?	(Hungary) Törekvés SE	0	0	0	-	-	-
MF	Ferenc Kolláth	6 Oct 1914	21	?	(Hungary) Szolnoki MÁV	0	0	0	-	-	-
DF	Imre Kőműves			?	(Hungary) Soproni Vasutas Sportegylet	0	0	0	-	-	-
FW	Gyula Karácsonyi	5 Nov 1917	18	?	(Hungary) Ferencvárosi TC	0	0	0	-	-	-
FW	Gyula Krivicz			?	(Hungary) Pécsi VSK	0	0	0	-	-	-
FW	Béla Pósa	25 Jun 1914	22	?	(Hungary) Ferencvárosi TC	0	0	0	-	-	-
GK	János Simon	1 Mar 1908	28	?	(Hungary) Szegedi Kolozsvári Egyetemi AC	0	0	0	-	-	-
FW	Mátyás Tóth	1 Apr 1918	18	?	(Hungary) Békéscsabai AK	0	0	0	-	-	-

== Italy ==
Head coach: Vittorio Pozzo

Pos.	Player	DoB	Age	Caps	Club	Tournament games	Tournament goals	Minutes played	Sub off	Sub on	Cards yellow/red
MF	Giuseppe Baldo	27 Jul 1914	22	?	(Italy) S.S. Lazio	4	0	420	-	-
FW	Sergio Bertoni	23 Sep 1915	20	?	(Italy) A.C. Pisa	3	0	330	-	-
MF	Carlo Biagi	20 Apr 1904	32	?	(Italy) A.C. Pisa	4	4	420	-	-
FW	Giulio Cappelli	4 Mar 1911	25	?	(Italy) U.S. V.P. Viareggio	2	1	180	-	-
DF	Alfredo Foni	20 Jan 1911	25	?	(Italy) Juventus	4	0	420	-	-
FW	Annibale Frossi	6 Aug 1911	24	?	(Italy) A.S. Ambrosiana-Inter	4	7	420	-	-
FW	Francesco Gabriotti	12 Aug 1914	21	?	(Italy) S.S. Lazio	1	0	120	-	-
FW	Ugo Locatelli	5 Feb 1916	20	?	(Italy) A.S. Ambrosiana-Inter	4	0	420	-	-
DF	Libero Marchini	31 Oct 1914	21	?	(Italy) U.S. Lucchese-Libertas	4	0	420	-	-
FW	Alfonso Negro	5 Jul 1915	21	?	(Italy) A.C. Fiorentina	1	1	120	-	-
MF	Achille Piccini	24 Oct 1911	24	?	(Italy) A.C. Fiorentina	4	0	420	-	-
DF	Pietro Rava	21 Jan 1916	20	?	(Italy) Juventus	4	0	383	-	-	/1 red
MF	Luigi Scarabello	17 Jun 1916	20	?	(Italy) A.C. Spezia	1	0	90	-	-
GK	Bruno Venturini	26 Sep 1911	24	?	(Italy) A.C. Sampierdarenese	4	0	420	-	-
	Stand-by players -
GK	Mario Gianni	19 Nov 1902	33	0	(Italy) F.S. Sestrese	0	0	0	-	-	-
FW	Carlo Girometta	9 Nov 1913	22	0	(Italy) Piacenza Sp.	0	0	0	-	-	-
MF	Adolfo Giuntoli	14 May 1913	23	0	(Italy) Alessandria U.S.	0	0	0	-	-	-
FW	Mario Nicolini	25 Jun 1912	24	0	(Italy) U.S. Livorno	0	0	0	-	-	-
DF	Lamberto Petri	21 Jan 1910	26	0	(Italy) A.G.C. Bologna	0	0	0	-	-	-
MF	Sandro Puppo	28 Jan 1918	18	0	(Italy) Piacenza Sp.	0	0	0	-	-	-
DF	Corrado Tamietti	18 Jan 1914	22	0	(Italy) A.C. Brescia	0	0	0	-	-	-
GK	Paolo Vannucci	19 Sep 1913	22	0	(Italy) A.C. Pisa	0	0	0	-	-	-

== Japan ==
Head coach: (Empire of Japan) Shigeyoshi Suzuki

Pos.	Player	DoB	Age	Caps	Club	Tournament games	Tournament goals	Minutes played	Sub off	Sub on	Cards yellow/red
DF	Tadao Horie	13 Sep 1913	22	?	(Empire of Japan) Waseda University	1	0	90	-	-
FW	Shogo Kamo	12 Dec 1915	20	?	(Japan) Waseda University	2	0	180	-	-
FW	Takeshi Kamo	8 Feb 1915	21	?	(Empire of Japan) Waseda University	2	0	180	-	-
FW	Taizo Kawamoto	17 Jan 1914	22	?	(Empire of Japan) Waseda University	2	1	180	-	-
MF	Kim Yong-Sik	25 Jul 1910	26	?	(Empire of Japan) Kyungsung FC	2	0	180	-	-
FW	Akira Matsunaga	21 Sep 1914	21	?	(Empire of Japan) Tokyo Bunri University	2	1	180	-	-
MF	Koichi Oita	9 Apr 1914	22	?	(Empire of Japan) Imperial University of Tokyo	2	0	180	-	-
GK	Rihei Sano	21 Sep 1914	21	?	(Empire of Japan) Waseda University	2	0	180	-	-
DF	Yasuo Suzuki	30 Apr 1913	23	?	(Empire of Japan) Waseda University	1	0	90	-	-
DF	Teizo Takeuchi	6 Nov 1908	27	?	(Empire of Japan) Imperial University of Tokyo	2	0	180	-	-
MF	Motoo Tatsuhara	14 Jan 1913	23	?	(Empire of Japan) Waseda University	2	0	180	-	-
FW	Tokutaro Ukon	26 Sep 1913	22	?	(Empire of Japan) Keio University	2	1	180	-	-
	Stand-by players -
GK	Sei Fuwa	2 Jul 1915	20	?	(Empire of Japan) Waseda University Senior High School	0	0	0	-	-	-
FW	Shoichi Nishimura	1912		?	(Empire of Japan) Waseda University	0	0	0	-	-	-
MF	Sekiji Sasano	16 Dec 1914	21	?	(Empire of Japan) Waseda University	0	0	0	-	-	-
FW	Toyoji Takahashi	24 Sep 1915	20	?	(Empire of Japan) Imperial University of Tokyo	0	0	0	-	-	-

== Luxembourg ==
Head coach: Paul Feierstein

Pos.	Player	DoB	Age	Caps	Club	Tournament games	Tournament goals	Minutes played	Sub off	Sub on	Cards yellow/red
MF	Joseph Fischer	24 Feb 1909	27	?	(Luxembourg) The National Schifflange	1	0	90	-	-
DF	Jean-Pierre Frisch	7 May 1908	28	?	(Luxembourg) The National Schifflange	1	0	90	-	-
FW	Robert Geib	2 Nov 1911	24	?	CA Spora Luxembourg	1	0	90	-	-
GK	Jean-Pierre Hoscheid	22 Jun 1912	24	?	(Luxembourg) Jeunesse Esch	1	0	90	-	-
FW	Gusty Kemp	24 Feb 1917	19	?	(Luxembourg) AS Differdingen	1	0	90	-	-
MF	Arnold Kieffer	30 Sep 1910	25	?	(Luxembourg) FC Progrès Niedercorn	1	0	90	-	-
DF	Victor Majérus	26 Mar 1913	23	?	(Luxembourg) Jeunesse Esch	1	0	90	-	-
FW	Léon Mart	18 Sep 1914	21	?	(Luxembourg) CS Fola Esch	1	0	90	-	-
FW	Ernest Mengel	27 Mar 1913	23	?	(Luxembourg) Stade Dudelange	1	0	90	-	-
DF	Pierre Mousel	10 May 1915	21	?	(Luxembourg) Jeunesse Esch	1	0	90	-	-
MF	Oskar Stamet	9 Sep 1913	22	?	CA Spora Luxembourg	1	0	90	-	-
	Stand-by players -
MF	Alphonse Feyder	12 Jun 1916	20	?	(Luxembourg) FC Progrès Niedercorn	0	0	0	-	-	-
GK	Eugène Jeanty	28 Feb 1911	25	0	(Luxembourg) FA Red Boys Differdange	0	0	0	-	-	-
DF	Jean Schmit	27 Apr 1915	21	?	(Luxembourg) Stade Dudelange	0	0	0	-	-	-
FW	Théophile Speicher	12 Aug 1909	26	?	CA Spora Luxembourg	0	0	0	-	-	-
MF	Arthur Bernard				(Luxembourg) Jeunesse Esch	0	0	0	-	-	-

== Norway ==
Head coach: Asbjørn Halvorsen

Pos.	Player	DoB	Age	Caps	Club	Tournament games	Tournament goals	Minutes played	Sub off	Sub on	Cards yellow/red
FW	Arne Brustad	14 Apr 1912	24	?	(Norway) Lyn	4	5	390	-	-
DF	Nils Eriksen	5 Mar 1911	25	?	(Norway) Odd	4	0	390	-	-
FW	Odd Frantzen	20 Jan 1913	23	?	(Norway) Hardy	3	0	390	-	-
FW	Sverre Hansen	23 Jun 1913	23	?	(Norway) Fram Larvik	1	0	90	-	-
MF	Rolf Holmberg	24 Aug 1914	21	?	(Norway) Odd	4	0	390	-	-
DF	Øivind Holmsen	28 Apr 1912	24	?	(Norway) Lyn	3	0	300	-	-
DF	Fredrik Horn	8 Jun 1916	20	?	(Norway) Lyn	1	0	90	-	-
FW	Magnar Isaksen	13 Oct 1910	25	?	(Norway) Lyn	3	2	300	-	-
GK	Henry Johansen	21 Jul 1904	32	?	(Norway) Vålerengen	4	0	390	-	-
MF	Jørgen Juve	22 Nov 1906	29	?	(Norway) Lyn	4	0	390	-	-
FW	Reidar Kvammen	23 Jul 1914	22	?	(Norway) Viking	4	1	390	-	-
FW	Alf Martinsen	29 Dec 1911	24	?	(Norway) Lillestrøm	4	2	390	-	-
FW	Magdalon Monsen	19 Apr 1910	26	?	(Norway) Hardy	1	0	90	-	-
MF	Frithjof Ulleberg	10 Sep 1911	24	?	(Norway) Lyn	4	0	390	-	-
	Stand-by players -
GK	Håkon Gundersen	18 Sep 1907	28	?	(Norway) Frigg Oslo F.K.	0	0	0	-	-	-
MF	Kristian Henriksen	3 Mar 1911	25	?	(Norway) Lyn	0	0	0	-	-	-
FW	Arne Ileby	2 Dec 1913	22	?	(Norway) Fredrikstad FK	0	0	0	-	-	-

Seventeen players went to the Olympics. The formal application originally included five other players who did not travel to Berlin: Sverre Kvammen (Viking FK), Rolf Johannessen (Fredrikstad FK), Kjeld Kjos (SFK Brann), Birger Pedersen (SK Hardy), and Petter Svennungsen (Odd Grenland).

== Peru ==
Head coach: Alberto Denegri

Pos.	Player	DoB	Age	Caps	Club	Tournament games	Tournament goals	Minutes played	Sub off	Sub on	Cards yellow/red
FW	Jorge Alcalde	26 Nov 1916	19	?	(Peru) Sport Boys	1	1	120	-	-
FW	Teodoro Alcalde	20 Sep 1913	22	?	(Peru) Sport Boys	1	0	90	-	-
MF	Segundo Castillo	17 Jul 1913	23	?	(Peru) Sport Boys	2	0	210	-	-
DF	Arturo Férnandez	3 Feb 1910	26	?	(Peru) Universitario de Deportes	2	0	210	-	-
FW	Teodoro Fernández	20 May 1913	23	?	(Peru) Universitario de Deportes	2	6	210	-	-
MF	Orestes Jordán	21 Nov 1913	22	?	(Peru) Universitario de Deportes	2	0	210	-	-
DF	Víctor Lavalle	5 Jun 1911	25	?	(Peru) Alianza Lima	2	0	210	-	-
FW	Adelfo Magallanes	29 Aug 1913	22	?	(Peru) Alianza Lima	2	0	210	-	-
FW	José Morales	30 Oct 1909	26	?	(Peru) Alianza Lima	2	0	210	-	-
MF	Carlos Tovar	2 Apr 1915	21	?	(Peru) Universitario de Deportes	2	0	210	-	-
GK	Juan Valdivieso	6 May 1910	26	?	(Peru) Alianza Lima	2	0	210	-	-
FW	Alejandro Villanueva	4 Jun 1908	28	?	(Peru) Alianza Lima	2	4	210	-	-
	Stand-by players -
FW	Andrés Álvarez	10 Sep 1915	20	?	(Peru) Sport Boys	0	0	0	-	-	-
DF	Raúl Chappell	23 Jul 1911	25	?	(Peru) Sport Boys	0	0	0	-	-	-
MF	Eulogio García	11 Mar 1911	25	?	(Peru) Alianza Lima	0	0	0	-	-	-
FW	Pedro Ibáñez	29 May 1912	25	?	(Peru) Sport Boys	0	0	0	-	-	-
MF	Enrique Landa	23 Sep 1913	22	?	(Peru) Alianza Lima	0	0	0	-	-	-
GK	Víctor Marchena	22 Sep 1914	21	?	(Peru) Sport Boys	0	0	0	-	-	-
MF	Miguel Pacheco	12 Apr 1912	24	?	(Peru) Sport Boys	0	0	0	-	-	-
FW	Arturo Paredes	6 Oct 1913	22	?	(Peru) Sport Boys	0	0	0	-	-	-
DF	Guillermo Pardo	19 Dec 1909	26	?	(Peru) Sport Boys	0	0	0	-	-	-
MF	Carlos Portal	11 Apr 1911	25	?	(Peru) Sport Boys	0	0	0	-	-	-

== Poland ==
Head coach: Józef Kałuża

Pos.	Player	DoB	Age	Caps	Club	Tournament games	Tournament goals	Minutes played	Sub off	Sub on	Cards yellow/red
GK	Spirydion Albański	4 Oct 1907	28	15	(Poland) Pogoń Lwów	4	0	360	-	-
MF	Franciszek Cebulak	16 Sep 1906	29	3	(Poland) Legia Warsaw	1	0	90	-	-
MF	Ewald Dytko	18 Oct 1914	21	5	(Poland) Dąb Katowice	4	0	360	-	-
FW	Hubert Gad	15 Aug 1914	21	1	(Poland) Śląsk Świętochłowice	4	4	360	-	-
DF	Antoni Gałecki	4 Jun 1906	30	5	(Poland) ŁKS Łódź	4	0	360	-	-
MF	Wilhelm Góra	18 Jan 1916	20	1	(Poland) Cracovia	1	0	90	-	-
FW	Walerian Kisieliński	1 Mar 1907	29	5	(Poland) Polonia Warsaw	1	0	90	-	-
MF	Józef Kotlarczyk	13 Feb 1907	29	23	(Poland) Wisła Kraków	3	0	270	-	-
DF	Henryk Martyna	14 Nov 1907	28	20	(Poland) Legia Warsaw	3	0	270	-	-
FW	Michał Matyas	28 Sep 1910	25	12	(Poland) Pogoń Lwów	1	0	90	-	-
FW	Walenty Musielak	7 Feb 1913	23	0	(Poland) HCP Poznań	1	0	90	-	-
FW	Teodor Peterek	7 Nov 1910	25	5	(Poland) Ruch Chorzów	4	1	360	-	-
FW	Ryszard Piec	17 Aug 1913	22	5	(Poland) Naprzód Lipiny	3	1	270	-	-
FW	Friedrich Scherfke	7 Sep 1909	26	5	(Poland) Warta Poznań	2	0	180	-	-
DF	Władysław Szczepaniak	19 May 1910	26	11	(Poland) Polonia Warsaw	1	0	90	-	-
MF	Jan Wasiewicz	6 Jan 1911	25	3	(Poland) Pogoń Lwów	3	0	270	-	-
FW	Gerard Wodarz	10 Aug 1913	22	11	(Poland) Ruch Chorzów	4	5	360	-	-
	Stand-by players -
GK	Marian Fontowicz	13 Jul 1907	29	8	(Poland) Warta Poznań	0	0	0	-	-	-
GK	Edward Madejski	11 Aug 1914	21	0	(Poland) Wisła Kraków	0	0	0	-	-	-
MF	Wilhelm Piec	2 Nov 1915	20	0	(Poland) Naprzód Lipiny	0	0	0	-	-	-
DF	Alojzy Sitko	5 Jul 1911	25	0	(Poland) Wisła Kraków	0	0	0	-	-	-
FW	Jerzy Wostal	6 Dec 1914	21	0	(Poland) AKS Chorzow	0	0	0	-	-	-

== Sweden ==
Head coach: John Pettersson

Pos.	Player	DoB	Age	Caps	Club	Tournament games	Tournament goals	Minutes played	Sub off	Sub on	Cards yellow/red
DF	Otto Andersson	7 May 1910	26	14	(Sweden) Örgryte IS	1	0	90	-	-
GK	Sven "Svenne Berka" Bergquist (Bergqvist)	20 Aug 1914	21	12	(Sweden) AIK	1	0	90	-	-
MF	Victor Carlund	5 Feb 1906	30	11	(Sweden) Örgryte IS	1	0	90	-	-
MF	Arvid "Emma" Emanuelsson	25 Dec 1913	22	4	(Sweden) IF Elfsborg	1	0	90	-	-
FW	Karl-Erik Grahn	5 Nov 1914	21	11	(Sweden) IF Elfsborg	1	0	90	-	-
FW	Åke Hallman	12 Nov 1912	23	9	(Sweden) IF Elfsborg	1	0	90	-	-
MF	Torsten Johansson	17 Jan 1906	30	13	(Sweden) IFK Norrköping	1	0	90	-	-
FW	Sven "Jonas" Jonasson	9 Jul 1909	27	20	(Sweden) IF Elfsborg	1	0	90	-	-
FW	Gustaf "Niggern" Josefsson	16 Feb 1916	20	4	(Sweden) AIK	1	0	90	-	-
DF	Erik "Järnbacken" Källström	5 Mar 1908	28	6	(Sweden) IF Elfsborg	1	0	90	-	-
FW	Erik "Lillis" Persson	19 Nov 1909	26	20	(Sweden) AIK	1	2	90	-	-
	Stand-by players -
MF	Erik Almgren	28 Jan 1908	28	0	(Sweden) AIK	0	0	0	-	-	-
MF	Gillis Andersson	10 May 1910	26	0	(Sweden) IF Elfsborg	0	0	0	-	-	-
FW	Bertil Ericsson	6 Nov 1908	27	6	(Sweden) Sandvikens IF	0	0	0	-	-	-
MF	Isidor Eriksson	11 Nov 1909	26	0	(Sweden) AIK	0	0	0	-	-	-
FW	Holger Johansson	18 Jan 1911	35	2	(Sweden) GAIS	0	0	0	-	-	-
FW	Knut Kroon	19 Jun 1906	30	35	(Sweden) Helsingborgs IF	0	0	0	-	-	-
MF	Folke Lind	4 Apr 1913	23	0	(Sweden) GAIS	0	0	0	-	-	-
GK	Gustav Sjöberg	23 Mar 1913	23	0	(Sweden) AIK	0	0	0	-	-	-
DF	Valter Sköld	12 Feb 1910	26	4	(Sweden) AIK	0	0	0	-	-	-
MF	Einar Snitt	13 October 1905	30	17	(Sweden) Sandvikens IF	0	0	0	-	-	-
FW	Åke Törnkvist	25 September 1915	20	0	(Sweden) IK Sleipner	0	0	0	-	-	-

== Turkey ==
Head coach: (Republic of Ireland) James Elliot Donnelly

Pos.	Player	DoB	Age	Caps	Club	Tournament games	Tournament goals	Minutes played	Sub off	Sub on	Cards yellow/red
MF	Lütfü Aksoy	17 Jul 1911	25	?	(Turkey) Galatasaray S.K.	1	0	90	-	-
DF	Yaşar Alparslan	23 Mar 1914	22	?	(Turkey) Fenerbahçe S.K.	1	0	90	-	-
FW	Sait Altınordu	24 Jul 1912	24	?	(Turkey) Altınordu S.K.	1	0	90	-	-
FW	Fikret Arıcan	17 Jul 1912	24	?	(Turkey) Fenerbahçe S.K.	1	0	90	-	-
GK	Cihat Arman	16 Jul 1915	21	?	(Turkey) Gençlerbirliği S.K.	1	0	90	-	-
FW	Rebii Erkal	10 Feb 1911	25	?	(Turkey) Güneş SK	1	0	90	-	-
MF	Mehmet Reşat Nayır	13 Jul 1911	25	?	(Turkey) Fenerbahçe S.K.	1	0	90	-	-
DF	Hüsnü Savman	18 Aug 1908	27	?	(Turkey) Beşiktaş J.K.	1	0	90	-	-
FW	Niyazi Sel	12 Mar 1908	28	?	(Turkey) Fenerbahçe S.K.	1	0	90	-	-
MF	İbrahim Tusder	15 Jan 1915	21	?	(Turkey) Güneş SK	1	0	90	-	-
FW	Hakkı Yeten	3 Dec 1910	25	?	(Turkey) Beşiktaş J.K.	1	0	90	-	-
	Stand-by players -
DF	Faruk Barlas	12 Apr 1915	21	?	(Turkey) Galatasaray S.K.	0	0	0	-	-	-
MF	Adil Bumin	21 Jan 1914	22	?	(Turkey)	0	0	0	-	-	-
FW	Necdet Cici	26 Jun 1912	24	?	(Turkey) Galatasaray S.K.	0	0	0	-	-	-
FW	Şeref Görkey	1 Jan 1913	23	?	(Turkey) Beşiktaş J.K.	0	0	0	-	-	-
FW	Fuat Göztepe	16 Jun 1912	24	?	(Turkey) Göztepe A.Ş.	0	0	0	-	-	-
MF	İsmail Hakkı Alaç	25 May 1911	25	?	(Turkey) Galatasaray S.K.	0	0	0	-	-	-
GK	Avni Kurgan	27 Jan 1910	26	?	(Turkey) Galatasaray S.K.	0	0	0	-	-	-
FW	Gündüz Kılıç	29 Oct 1918	17	?	(Turkey) Galatasaray S.K.	0	0	0	-	-	-

== United States ==
Head coach: (United States) Elmer Schroeder

No.	Pos.	Player	Date of birth (age)	Caps	Club
	MF	Charles Altemose	3 June 1913 (aged 23)	0	(United States) Philadelphia German-Americans
	GK	Frank Bartkus	11 November 1915 (aged 20)	0	(United States) Brooklyn German Sports Club
	MF	Edward Begley	28 August 1914 (aged 21)		(United States) St. Louis Irish Village Club
	FW	Julius Chimielewski	18 June 1915 (aged 21)		(United States) Trenton Highlanders
	MF	James Crockett	17 February 1910 (aged 26)	0	(United States) Philadelphia German-Americans
	GK	Robert Denton	20 November 1907 (aged 28)		(United States) Philadelphia German-Americans
	MF	Bill Fiedler	10 January 1910 (aged 26)		(United States) Philadelphia German-Americans
	FW	Andrew Gajda	26 February 1907 (aged 29)	0	(United States) Boston Soccer Football Club
	DF	Frank Greinert	5 February 1909 (aged 27)	0	(United States) Philadelphia German-Americans
	FW	Fred Lutkefedder	15 April 1910 (aged 26)	0	(United States) Philadelphia German-Americans
	FW	George Nemchik	14 March 1915 (aged 21)		(United States) Philadelphia German-Americans
	MF	John Olthaus	12 May 1916 (aged 20)	0	(United States) Brooklyn German American
	MF	Peter Pietras	21 April 1908 (aged 28)		(United States) Philadelphia German-Americans
	FW	Francis Ryan	10 January 1908 (aged 28)		(United States) Philadelphia German-Americans
	DF	Fred Stoll	23 January 1909 (aged 27)		(United States) Philadelphia German-Americans
	DF	Fred Zbikowski	18 November 1912 (aged 23)	0	(United States) Kearny Scots-Americans
	DF	John Zywan	25 May 1909 (aged 27)		(United States) Pittsburgh Castle Shannon
