= Deaths in August 1995 =

The following is a list of notable deaths in August 1995.

Entries for each day are listed alphabetically by surname. A typical entry lists information in the following sequence:

- Name, age, country of citizenship at birth, subsequent country of citizenship (if applicable), reason for notability, cause of death (if known), and reference.

== August 1995 ==
=== 1 ===
- Julián Berrendero, 83, Spanish road racing cyclist who twice won the Vuelta a España.
- Phyllis Brooks, 80, American actress and model.
- Frank W. Cyr, 95, American educator and author.
- Martha Genenger, 83, German Olympic swimmer (1936).
- Colin Falkland Gray, 80, New Zealand fighter ace during World War II.
- Ruby Knezovich, 77, Canadian baseball player.
- Satoshi Matsui, 80, Japanese Olympic basketball player (1936).
- Esther Muir, 92, American actress.
- Gopalaswami Parthasarathy, 83, Indian journalist, educationist, and diplomat.
- Ralf Thienel, 36, German rower and Olympian (1988).
- Rudolph F. Zallinger, 75, Austrian-Russian artist.

=== 2 ===
- Irwin Bazelon, 73, American composer of contemporary classical music.
- Thomas Brimelow, Baron Brimelow, 79, British diplomat.
- Lillian Bronson, 92, American character actress.
- Fred Daly, 83, Australian politician.
- Eva Gredal, 68, Danish politician.
- Oonagh Guinness, 85, Anglo-Irish socialite, society hostess and art collector.
- Yury Iosifovich Koval, 57, Russian author, artist, and screenplay writer, heart attack.
- Juan López Moctezuma, 63, Mexican film director and actor.
- Carl Bernard Rubin, 75, American district judge (United States District Court for the Southern District of Ohio).
- Brian Smith, 54, Canadian ice hockey player (Los Angeles Kings, Minnesota North Stars), and sportscaster, shot.

=== 3 ===
- Lionel Philias Coderre, 80, Canadian politician.
- Harry Craft, 80, American Major League Baseball player (Cincinnati Reds), and manager (Kansas City Athletics, Houston Colt .45s).
- Mary Lena Faulk, 69, American golfer.
- Brendon Hackwill, 53, Australian rules footballer and Olympic basketball player (1964).
- Ida Lupino, 77, British-American actress (The Adventures of Sherlock Holmes, High Sierra) and film director (The Hitch-Hiker), stroke.
- Alan Mitchell, 72, British forester, dendrologist and botanist.
- Edward Whittemore, 62, American novelist.

=== 4 ===
- Alejandro Almendras, 76, Filipino politician.
- Cal Anderson, 47, American military officer and politician.
- Jacques Aubert, 78, Swiss entomologist.
- Dick Bartell, 87, American baseball player, Alzheimer's disease.
- Jock Carroll, 76, Canadian writer, journalist and photographer.
- Uno Fransson, 67, Swedish Olympic discus thrower (1948).
- Jean-Pierre Frisch, 87, Luxembourgish Olympic football player (1936).
- Antonio Leonviola, 82, Italian screenwriter and film director.
- J. Howard Marshall, 90, American billionaire, oil executive, and husband of Anna Nicole Smith.
- Kiiti Morita, 80, Japanese mathematician.
- Said Ramadan, 69, Egyptian political activist and humanitarian.
- Bernie Ruelle, 74, American ice hockey player (Detroit Red Wings).

=== 5 ===
- Agha Hasan Abedi, 73, Pakistani banker.
- Fletcher Allen, 90, American jazz saxophonist, clarinetist, and composer.
- Menachem Avidom, 87, Israeli composer.
- Clarice Blackburn, 74, American actress, cancer.
- Allan Bridge, 50, American conceptual artist.
- Angelo Brovelli, 84, American NFL football player (Pittsburgh Pirates).
- J. Marshall Brown, 68, American politician and insurance agent.
- Massimiliano Capuzzoni, 26, Italian rugby player, diving accident.
- Mark Colton, 34, British racing driver and software author, racing accident.
- Eduardo Endtner, 53, Brazilian Olympic rower (1960).
- Izet Nanić, 29, Bosnian Army brigade commander, killed in action.
- Robert Shaw, 95, English cricketer and Royal Navy officer.
- Francesco Suppo, 79, Italian Olympic wrestler (1948).

=== 6 ===
- Irja Aav, 51, Estonian actress.
- Hugh Borton, 92, American historian.
- André Fleury, 92, French composer, pianist, organist, and pedagogue.
- Harold Lever, Baron Lever of Manchester, 81, British barrister and politician.
- Nadira, 26, Pakistani film actress and dancer, homicide.
- Gil Patrick, 87, Australian rules footballer.
- Toney Penna, 87, Italian-American golfer and designer of golf clubs and gear.
- Ike Petersen, 86, American football player (Chicago Cardinals, Detroit Lions).
- George Svendsen, 82, American gridiron football player (Green Bay Packers).
- Montri Tramote, 95, Thai musician and scholar, heart failure.

=== 7 ===
- David Begelman, 73, American film producer, suicide.
- Brigid Brophy, 66, British novelist, multiple sclerosis.
- Tyra Hunter, 24, transgender hairdresser.
- Haim Kaufman, 60, Israeli politician.
- Dursley McLinden, 30, Manx actor.
- Don Patinkin, 73, American-Israeli monetary economist.
- Tom Scott, 77, Scottish poet, editor, and prose writer.
- Harold Stewart, 78, Australian poet and oriental scholar.
- Maksim Tank, 82, Belarusian Soviet journalist, poet and translator.

=== 8 ===
- John Adams, 57, American football player (Chicago Bears, Los Angeles Rams).
- Kurt Becher, 85, German SS officer who was Commissar of all Nazi concentration camps.
- Ronald Beeson, 58, English cricket player.
- Fyodor Dyachenko, 78, Russian/Soviet sniper during World War II, credited with 425 kills.
- Carol Hughes, 85, American actress.
- Herbert Ihlefeld, 81, German Luftwaffe military aviator and fighter ace.
- Edmund Wainwright, 92, Australian cricketer.

=== 9 ===
- Teodoro Alcalde, 81, Peruvian football player and Olympian (1936).
- Jerry Garcia, 53, American guitarist (The Grateful Dead), heart attack.
- Suen Kam Shun, 88, Chinese football player and Olympian (1936).
- Romuald Spasowski, 74, Polish diplomat, ambassador and defector, cancer.
- Luis Procuna, 72, Mexican bullfighter and actor, plane crash.

=== 10 ===
- Gijs van Aardenne, 65, Dutch politician, amyotrophic lateral sclerosis.
- Leo Apostel, 69, Belgian philosopher.
- Donald Bisset, 84, British character actor and children's author.
- Thomas Elliot Bowman III, 76, American carcinologist.
- Wei-Liang Chow, 83, Chinese mathematician.
- Florestan Fernandes, 75, Brazilian sociologist and politician.
- Josseline Gaël, 78, French film actress.
- Fay Honey Knopp, 76, American Quaker minister, and peace and civil rights advocat.
- Marcel Moussy, 71, French screenwriter and television director.
- Harishankar Parsai, 72, Indian writer.
- Aldo Protti, 75, Italian baritone.
- Baba Rexheb, 93, Albanian Islamic scholar and Sufi.
- Niilo Ryhtä, 88, Finnish politician.
- Tikiri Banda Subasinghe, 81, Sri Lankan statesman.
- Axel Svendsen, 83, Danish Olympic canoeist (1936).
- Ray Whittorn, 83, Australian politician.
- Peter Williams, 81, English designer and dance critic, heart attack.

=== 11 ===
- Libby Altwerger, 80, Canadian artist and educator.
- Karel Berman, 76, Czech composer, opera singer, music educator.
- Sam Berman, 88, American caricaturist of the 1940s and 1950s.
- Joseph Bermingham, 76, Irish Labour Party politician.
- Alonzo Church, 92, American mathematician.
- Reg Date, 74, Australian soccer player.
- Damon Edge, 45, American musician, heart attack.
- Phil Harris, 91, American comedian and actor (The Jungle Book, Robin Hood, The Aristocats), heart attack.
- Frank Kendrick, 81, Australian rules footballer.
- John H. Pratt, 84, American lawyer and district judge (United States District Court for the District of Columbia).
- Al Smith, 91, American baseball player (New York Giants).
- Wilbur Stark, 83, American writer and film, television, and radio producer and director.
- Herbert Sumsion, 96, English organist.

=== 12 ===
- Bobby Burns, 90, Canadian ice hockey player (Chicago Blackhawks).
- Jean Chapel, 70, American country singer and songwriter.
- Frank Cvitanovich, 67, Canadian filmmaker.
- Louise Lorimer, 97, American actress.
- Marty Paich, 70, American arranger, composer, pianist, and bandleader, colorectal cancer.
- Bruno Pasquini, 80, Italian racing cyclist.
- Russ Reader, 72, American football player (Chicago Bears).
- Achille Togliani, 71, Italian singer and actor.
- Felipe Tromp, 77, Governor of Aruba.

=== 13 ===
- Bruce Grant, 31, New Zealand Olympic alpine skier (1984).
- Alison Hargreaves, 33, British mountain climber, exposure during climb.
- Pêr-Jakez Helias, 80-81, Breton stage actor, journalist, author, poet, and writer.
- Víctor Klein, 77, Chilean footballer.
- Jan Křesadlo, 68, Czech psychologist, novelist and poet.
- Mickey Mantle, 63, American Hall of Fame baseball player (New York Yankees), liver cancer.
- Jesse Thomas, 84, American blues singer.
- Hanna Waag, 91, German film actress.

=== 14 ===
- Helmut Beumann, 82, German historian.
- Labron Harris, 86, American golfer and golf coach.
- Frances Margaret McGuire, 95, Australian author, community leader and philanthropist.
- Zdeněk Špinar, 79, Czech paleontologist and author.

=== 15 ===
- Viv Allen, 78, Canadian ice hockey player (New York Americans).
- Erbie Bowser, 77, American blues pianist and singer.
- Michael A. Hess, 43, Irish-American lawyer and chief legal counsel to the RNC, complications from AIDS.
- Humphrey Moore, 86, British pacifist and journalist.
- Reginald Rodrigues, 73, Indian Olympic field hockey player (1948).
- John Cameron Swayze, 89, American news commentator and game show panelist.
- Abdul Momin Talukdar, 65, Bangladeshi politician.
- Wally Wilson, 74, Canadian ice hockey player (Boston Bruins).

=== 16 ===
- Brooke Benjamin, 66, English mathematical physicist and mathematician.
- Ljubiša Broćić, 83, Serbian football manager.
- Park Dae-jong, 78, South Korean Olympic footballer (1948).
- Irène de Lipkowski, 96, French politician.
- Bobby DeBarge, 39, American R&B musician, AIDS related complications.
- Eddie Hart, 73, Australian rules footballer.
- Oveta Culp Hobby, 90, American lawyer, politician and cabinet member, stroke.
- John Lowe, 83, Scottish football player.
- J. P. McCarthy, 62, American radio personality, pneumonia.
- Leon Moser, 52, American convicted murderer, execution by lethal injection.
- Howie Shannon, 72, American basketball player (Providence Steamrollers, Boston Celtics) and coach (Virginia Tech Hokies), lung cancer.
- António Vilar, 82, Portuguese actor.

=== 17 ===
- George Bekefi, 70, American plasma physicist, inventor, and professor at MIT.
- Walter Cartier, 73, American boxer and actor.
- Mike Condello, 49, American rock musician, producer, and songwriter, suicide.
- Wild Bill Davis, 76, American organist, pianist, and arranger.
- Helen Singer Kaplan, 66, Austrian-American sex therapist, cancer.
- Howard Koch, 93, American screenwriter (Casablanca, Sergeant York, Letter from an Unknown Woman), Oscar winner (1944).
- Rollie Miles, 68, Canadian football player.
- Julius Monk, 82, American cabaret impresario.
- Jaroslav Papoušek, 66, Czech film director and screenwriter.
- Carl Samuelson, 68, American football player (Pittsburgh Steelers).
- Marjorie Sykes, 90, British educator and peace activist in India.
- David Warrilow, 60, English actor (Barton Fink, Radio Days, Simon), AIDS-related complications.
- Ted Whitten, 62, Australian rules footballer, prostate cancer.

=== 18 ===
- Julio Caro Baroja, 80, Spanish anthropologist, historian, linguist and essayist.
- Alexander Zeisal Bielski, 82, Belarus leader of the Bielski partisans during World War II.
- Philip Hodgins, 36, Australian poet.
- Dick Hogan, 77, American actor (Rope).
- Alex Joffé, 76, French film director and screenwriter.
- James Maxwell, 66, American actor and director.
- Helmuth Schlömer, 102, German Wehrmacht general during World War II.
- Dmitri Shepilov, 89, Soviet economist, lawyer and politician.
- Andrew Wood Wilkinson, 81, Scottish paediatrician.

=== 19 ===
- John H. Adams, 80, American National Champion Thoroughbred racing jockey.
- Silvio Amadio, 69, Italian film director and screenwriter.
- Rollen Henry Anthis, 79, United States Air Force Major General.
- Danny Arnold, 70, American producer, writer, comedian, actor and director.
- Jean Bocahut, 75, French Olympic rower (1948).
- Jack Carter, 87, Australian cricketer.
- Robert C. Frasure, 53, American diplomat and ambassador, traffic collision.
- William Summer Johnson, 82, American chemist and teacher.
- Pierre Schaeffer, 85, French composer, Alzheimer's disease.

=== 20 ===
- Maly Delschaft, 96, German actress.
- Paul Foster, 75, American gospel singer with The Soul Stirrers.
- John Gilmore, 63, American jazz saxophonist, clarinetist, and percussionist.
- Bill Kennedy, 76, American professional baseball pitcher (Washington Senators).
- Von McDaniel, 56, American professional baseball player (St. Louis Cardinals).
- Hugo Pratt, 68, Italian comics creator, colorectal cancer.
- Red Rhodes, 64, American pedal steel guitarist, pneumonia.
- Vladimír Škutina, 64, Czech writer, playwright, journalist, and television producer, cancer.

=== 21 ===
- Sally A. Bailie, 58, English trainer and owner of Thoroughbred racehorses, cancer.
- Subrahmanyan Chandrasekhar, 84, Indian astrophysicist, heart attack.
- Hal Cihlar, 81, American professional basketball player.
- Manfred Donike, 61, German biochemist and cyclist, heart attack.
- Anatole Fistoulari, 88, Ukrainian-British conductor.
- Sven Höglund, 84, Swedish cyclist and Olympian (1932).
- Nanni Loy, 69, Italian director for film and television, heart attack, cancer.
- Len Martin, 76, Australian sports broadcaster.
- Ken Rickards, 71, West Indian cricketer.
- Robert T. Smith, 77, American World War II fighter pilot and flying ace.
- Chuck Stevenson, 75, American racecar driver.

=== 22 ===
- Gilles Andruet, 37, French chess player, beaten to death, blunt trauma.
- Mohammed Usman Arif, 72, Indian politician.
- Johnny Carey, 76, Irish football player and manager.
- José Antonio Girón, 83, Spanish Falangist politician.
- René Notten, 45, Dutch football player and manager, heart attack.
- Stefan Ślopek, 80, Polish microbiologist and immunologist.

=== 23 ===
- Jaroslava Bajerová, 85, Czech gymnast and Olympian (1936).
- Johan Bergenstråhle, 60, Swedish film director and screenwriter.
- Mel Brown, 83, Australian rules footballer.
- Alfred Eisenstaedt, 96, German-American photographer.
- Dwayne Goettel, 31, Canadian electronic musician (Skinny Puppy).
- Leslie Graves, 35, American actress (Piranha II: The Spawning, Capitol), AIDS-related illness.
- Arthur Holt, 81, British politician.
- Gordon White, Baron White of Hull, 72, British-American peer and industrialist.
- Judith McHale, 52, Canadian Olympic swimmer (1960).
- Chen Pixian, 79, Chinese Communist revolutionary and politician.
- Cleveland Robinson, 80, American civil rights activist, kidney failure.
- Adele Simpson, 91, American fashion designer.
- Henrik Skougaard, 85, Norwegian Olympic equestrian (1936).
- Sylvester Stadler, 84, Austrian commander of the Waffen-SS during World War II.

=== 24 ===
- Zbyněk Brynych, 68, Czech film director.
- Jack Burns, 76, Australian rules footballer.
- Gary Crosby, 62, American singer and actor, lung cancer.
- Richard Degener, 83, American diver and Olympian (1932, 1936).
- Erich Geiringer, 78, New Zealand physician, writer, publisher.
- Sundaram Karivaradhan, 41, Indian racing driver, designer and business executive, plane crash.
- Killer Karl Krupp, 61, Dutch-American professional wrestler, cardioplegia.
- Eugene McDowell, 31, American basketball player (Florida Gators, FC Barcelona Bàsquet).
- Jason McRoy, 23, English mountain bike racer, traffic collision.
- Suad Švraka, 67, Yugoslavian footballer.

=== 25 ===
- Johannes Antonsson, 73, Swedish politician.
- John S. Badeau, 92, American diplomat, engineer, minister, and scholar.
- John Brunner, 60, British sci-fi author, heart attack.
- Setsuko, Princess Chichibu, 85, member of the Japanese Imperial Family, heart failure.
- Francis Lawrence Jobin, 81, Canadian politician Lieutenant Governor of Manitoba.
- Esteban Martín, 58, Spanish cyclist.
- John Mills, 75, American basketball player.
- Ludmilla Pajo, 47, Russian-Albanian writer and journalist.
- Arch Shields, 81, Australian rules footballer.
- Brede Skistad, 47, Norwegian football player and manager.
- Doug Stegmeyer, 43, American rock bassist and vocalist, suicide by gunshot.

=== 26 ===
- Antonio Brancaccio, 72, Italian judge, cancer.
- John Costello, 51-52, British military historian.
- Annie Kriegel, 68, French communist historian.
- Miklós Mihó, 82, Hungarian Olympic rower (1936).
- Olimi III of Toro, 49, Ugandan monarch and 11th Omukama of the Kingdom of Toro.
- Ronald White, 57, American musician (The Miracles), leukemia.
- Evelyn Wood, 86, American teacher who popularized speed reading.

=== 27 ===
- Dick Bentley, 88, Australian comedian and actor, Alzheimer's disease.
- Hans-Jürgen Dollheiser, 66, German Olympic field hockey player (1952).
- Glennon Patrick Flavin, 79, American prelate of the Roman Catholic Church.
- Carl Giles, 78, English cartoonist.
- Mary Beth Hughes, 75, American actress.
- Big Dee Irwin, 63, American singer and songwriter.
- Václav Ježek, 71, Czech-Slovak football coach.
- Allen Van, 80, American Olympic ice hockey player (1952).

=== 28 ===
- Earl W. Bascom, 89, American visual artist, rodeo performer, inventor, and actor, heart failure.
- Michael Ende, 65, German author (The NeverEnding Story, Momo, Jim Button and Luke the Engine Driver), stomach cancer.
- Thomas Gardner Ford, 77, American politician and businessman.
- Fritz Pliska, 79, German football player and coach.
- Juan Ríos, 53, Puerto Rican baseball player (Kansas City Royals).
- Gerard Salton, 68, German-American professor of computer science.
- Page Smith, 77, American historian, professor, author, and newspaper columnist.
- Michael VerMeulen, 38, American journalist and magazine editor of British GQ, drug overdose.

=== 29 ===
- Al Akins, 74, American football halfback and defensive back (Cleveland Browns).
- Harry Broadhurst, 89, British Royal Air Force commander and flying ace during World War II.
- Selma Burke, 94, American sculptor.
- Enrique Carreras, 70, Peruvian-Argentine film director, screenwriter and film producer.
- Pierre-Max Dubois, 65, French composer of classical music and conductor.
- François Hélary, 71, French cyclist.
- Art Jones, 76, American gridiron football player (Pittsburgh Steelers).
- Frank Perry, 65, American film director (David and Lisa, Mommie Dearest, Diary of a Mad Housewife), prostate cancer.
- Nanda Primavera, 97, Italian actress.
- George Schmidt, 67, American football player (Green Bay Packers, Chicago Cardinals).

=== 30 ===
- Agepê, 53, Brazilian singer and composer, diabetes.
- Fischer Black, 57, American economist, throat cancer.
- Carlos de Anda, 87, Mexican sprinter and Olympian (1932).
- Nikolay Kuznetsov, 64, Soviet Azerbaijani Olympic water polo player (1964).
- Azel Randolph Lusby, 88, Canadian lawyer and politician, member of the House of Commons of Canada (1953-1957).
- Sterling Morrison, 53, American guitarist (the Velvet Underground), non-Hodgkin's lymphoma.
- Lev Polugaevsky, 60, Belarusian chess Grandmaster, brain cancer.
- Alex Rado, 84, American football player (Pittsburgh Pirates).
- Adam Wiśniewski-Snerg, 58, Polish science fiction author, suicide.

=== 31 ===
- Murray Bornstein, 77, American neuroscientist.
- Mildred Coles, 75, American actress.
- Bill Deague, 82, Australian rules footballer.
- Barry Lee Fairchild, 41, American convicted murderer, execution by lethal injection.
- David Farrar, 87, English actor.
- Horst Janssen, 65, German graphic artist and printmaker.
- J. Erik Jonsson, 93, American businessman and mayor of Dallas.
- Gertrud Luckner, 94, German social worker and anti-Nazi resister during World War II.
- Carmen Mathews, 84, American actress and environmentalist.
- Jean Monnier, 71, French Olympic ski jumper (1948).
- A. A. Rahim, 75, Indian politician, freedom fighter, and union minister.
- Beant Singh, 73, Indian politician and Chief Minister of Punjab, assassination.
- Dilawar Singh Babbar, 25, Indian suicide bomber and assassin of Beant Singh.
