= Prisco (disambiguation) =

Prisco is a given name and surname.

Prisco or Priscos may also refer to:

- Di Prisco, a surname
- Los Priscos, a criminal group affiliated with the Medellin cartel in Colombia
- San Prisco, commune in the Province of Caserta, Italy
- Priscos, parish in Braga, Portugal
- Teodoro "Prisco" Alcalde Millos (1913–1995), Peruvian international football player
