= Penang XI =

- Flag

Penang XI
- Nickname: The Panthers
- Association: Penang FA
- Confederation: AFC (Asia)

Penang XI (also known as Penang, Penang Selection or Penang FA Selection) is a football team that represents Penang FA in exhibition matches.

== History ==
The Penang XI team is formed by the top players in the Penang FA team. Some of the players are mainly from the Malaysia national team. Penang FA usually plays against Associated Football team throughout the world.

== Match ==
Below are several top performers matches that be played by Penang.

Chinese Olympic team 1936 tours

19 June 1936	Penang	0 – 0	China Olympic	George Town, Penang, Malaysia
				Stadium: Padang Kota

Aryan Gymkhana XI (India) tour of Malaya and Singapore 1949

27 November 1949	Penang	2 – 1	India XI	George Town, Penang, Malaysia
				Stadium: Bandaraya Stadium

Merdeka friendlies

12 September 1957	Penang	9 – 2	Thailand	George Town, Penang, Malaysia
				Stadium: Bandaraya Stadium

Japan tour of South East Asia 1958-59

3 January 1959	Penang	2– 2	Japan	George Town, Penang, Malaysia
				Stadium: Bandaraya Stadium

Merdeka friendlies

26 August 1968	Penang	5 – 3	Western Australia	George Town, Penang, Malaysia
				Stadium: Bandaraya Stadium

== See also ==
- Penang FC
- Penang FC honours
