= Prisco =

Prisco is both a given name and surname. Notable people with the name include:

== As a given or middle name ==
- Prisco Nilo (born 1957), Filipino meteorologist
- Pietro Prisco Guglielmucci (died 1539), Italian Roman Catholic Bishop of Lavello (1515–1539)

== As a surname ==
- Giuseppe Antonio Ermenegildo Prisco (1833-1923), Italian Roman Catholic Church Cardinal and Archbishop of Naples
- Albert Prisco (1890–?), American actor
- Angelo Prisco (born 1939), American mobster
- Giulio Prisco (born 1957), Italian physicist
- Giuseppe Antonio Ermenegildo Prisco (1833–1923), Italian cardinal
- Lorenzo Prisco (born 1987), Italian footballer
- Michele Prisco (1920–2003), Italian journalist
- Nick Prisco (1909–1981), American football player

== As a nickname ==
- Teodoro "Prisco" Alcalde Millos (1913–1995), Peruvian footballer

== See also ==
- Prisco (disambiguation)
