= Cook-Walden Capital Parks Cemetery =

Cemetery in Travis County, Texas

Coordinates: 30.437°N 97.666°W

Cook-Walden Capital Parks Cemetery (also known as Capital Memorial Park and Capital Memorial Park Cemetery) is a cemetery located in Pflugerville, Texas, United States a suburb of Austin, Texas.

== Interrments ==
- T. D. Bell, blues guitarist
- Eva Carrillo de García, civil rights activist
- Tom Hamilton, baseball player
