= Guy Holmes =

Guy Holmes may refer to:

- Guy Holmes (footballer) (1905–1967), English footballer
- Guy E. Holmes (1873–1945), American musician and composer
- Guy Holmes (psychologist), clinical psychologist in the UK
