= Gyula Király =

Gyula Király may refer to:

- Gyula Király (footballer) (1908–?), Hungarian footballer
- Gyula Király (historian) (1927–2011), Hungarian literary historian
