= Barry Gardiner =

British politician (born 1957)

Barry Gardiner MP
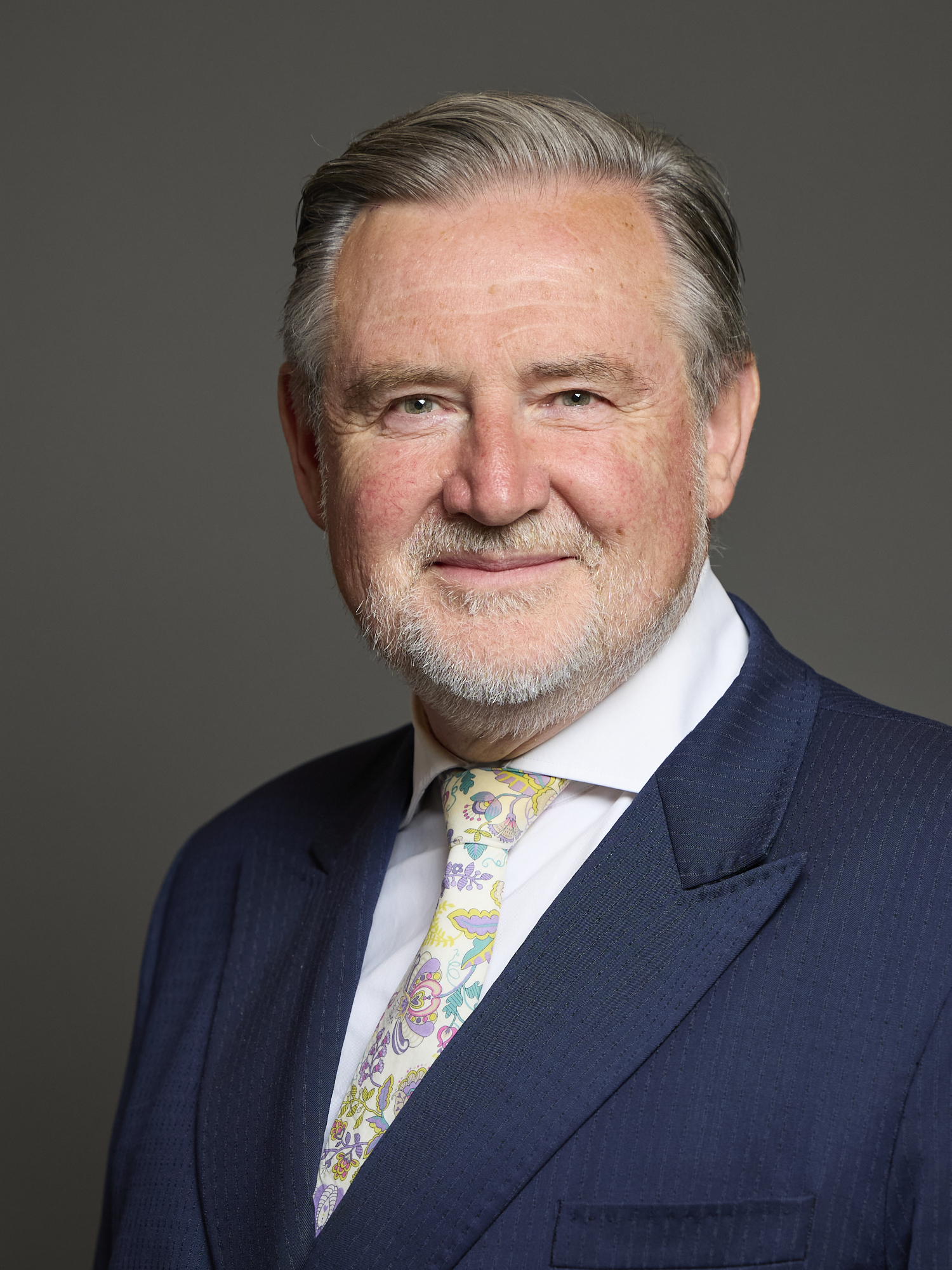
- Official portrait, 2024

Parliamentary Under-Secretary of State for Biodiversity, Landscape and Rural Affairs
- In office 5 May 2006 – 28 June 2007
- Prime Minister: Tony Blair
- Preceded by: Jim Knight
- Succeeded by: Jonathan Shaw

Parliamentary Under-Secretary of State for Delivery and Efficiency
- In office 10 May 2005 – 5 May 2006
- Prime Minister: Tony Blair
- Preceded by: Nigel Griffiths
- Succeeded by: Office abolished

Parliamentary Under-Secretary of State for Northern Ireland
- In office 2 April 2004 – 10 May 2005
- Prime Minister: Tony Blair
- Preceded by: Jane Kennedy
- Succeeded by: The Lord Rooker

Member of Parliament for Brent West Brent North (1997–2024)
- Incumbent
- Assumed office 1 May 1997
- Preceded by: Rhodes Boyson
- Majority: 3,793 (9.2%)
Shadow portfolios
Shadow Secretary of State
2016–2020	International Trade
2016	Energy and Climate Change
Shadow Minister
2016–2020	International Climate Change
2015–2016	Energy and Climate Change
2013–2015	Natural Environment and Fisheries

Personal details
- Born: Barry Strachan Gardiner; 10 March 1957 (age 69) Glasgow, Scotland
- Party: Labour
- Children: 4
- Education: The High School of Glasgow; University of St Andrews; Harvard University; Corpus Christi College, Cambridge
- Website: Official website

Barry Strachan Gardiner (born 10 March 1957) is a British politician who served as Member of Parliament (MP) for Brent North from 1997 until the seat's abolition in 2024 and Brent West since 2024. He is a member of the Labour Party.

The son of an Olympic footballer, Gardiner was born and educated in Glasgow before being moved to Hertfordshire to be educated at Haileybury and Imperial Service College. After studying at the University of St Andrews, he worked in the Student Christian Movement and considered a career in the Episcopal Church. He then studied philosophy at Harvard University and researched the subject at Corpus Christi College, Cambridge. He was first elected to public office in Cambridge and became the youngest mayor of the city in 1992. Leaving local government in 1994, he worked in marine arbitration before being elected to Parliament at the 1997 general election.

Gardiner served in Tony Blair's New Labour government from April 2004 to June 2007 as a junior minister in the Northern Ireland Office, Department of Trade and Industry and Department for Environment, Food and Rural Affairs respectively. After holding junior positions on the Official Opposition frontbench under Ed Miliband and Jeremy Corbyn, Gardiner served in Corbyn's Shadow cabinet as Shadow Secretary of State for Energy and Climate Change from June to July 2016. He subsequently served as Shadow Secretary of State for International Trade and Shadow Minister for International Climate Change until returning to the backbenches in April 2020.

== Early life and career ==
Barry Gardiner, the son of Olympic footballer John Gardiner, was born in Glasgow, Scotland. His mother trained as a surgeon and was the first woman to win the gold medal for surgery at the University of Glasgow. Before Gardiner was eight, his father had died of lung cancer; his mother moved him to Haileybury; six years later, his mother fell ill with cancer, dying by the time Gardiner was seventeen. He was educated at the High School of Glasgow before it became an Independent school, and Haileybury and Imperial Service College in Hertfordshire. He received an undergraduate Master of Arts from the University of St Andrews before serving for two years as full-time Scottish Regional Secretary of the Student Christian Movement. As a young man, he planned to become an Episcopal priest and began identifying politically with democratic and Christian socialism.

In 1983, Gardiner was awarded a Kennedy Memorial Trust scholarship to study philosophy at Harvard University under John Rawls, returning to conduct doctoral research at Corpus Christi College, Cambridge for three years from 1984. He was elected as a councillor to Cambridge City Council in 1988 becoming Mayor of Cambridge in 1992, the youngest mayor in the city's 800-year history. He left the council in 1994. Before his election to Parliament, he worked as a senior partner in shipping insurance and arbitration.

== Parliamentary career ==
=== In government: 1997–2010 ===
Gardiner contested the Greater London constituency of Brent North at the 1997 general election, defeating the incumbent Conservative MP Rhodes Boyson by 4,019 votes. Following his election, he moved from Cambridge to Hertfordshire. He made his maiden speech on 4 July 1997.

Gardiner served on the Procedure Committee, the Select Committee on Broadcasting, the Public Accounts Committee and the Joint Committee on Consolidation of Bills. He was Chair of the PLP Departmental Committee for Culture, Media and Sport and vice-chair of the PLP Departmental Committee for the Treasury. He was the Chairman of the Labour Friends of India, and has lectured at the Academy of National Economy in Moscow. He is a former vice-chair of Labour Friends of Israel and remains a member.

Gardiner became Parliamentary Private Secretary (PPS) to Minister of State at the Home Office Beverley Hughes in 2002. In 2004, he was appointed Parliamentary Under-Secretary of State at the Northern Ireland Office, moving to the same position at the Department of Trade and Industry following the 2005 general election. He moved to the Department for Environment, Food and Rural Affairs in a May 2006 reshuffle and left the Government in June 2007, to once again serve as a PPS, this time to the Business Secretary.

New Prime Minister Gordon Brown appointed Gardiner as his special representative on forestry in July 2007. He left this role "by mutual consent" on 13 September 2008 after joining other Labour MPs in declaring an MP should stand against Brown, accusing him of "vacillation, loss of international credibility and timorous political manoeuvres that the public cannot understand".

Gardiner's expenses in 2008–2009 were ranked 129 out of 647 MPs whilst his 2007–2008 expenses were ranked 369. He claimed for a second home, despite his constituency being near Westminster. After the 2010 general election, the Independent Parliamentary Standards Authority published new expenses rules replacing funding for a second home with a London Allowance of £3,760 for MPs with seats within 20 miles of Westminster. Those who kept their seats and already owned a second home had profits "recouped". The Legg Report requested Gardiner repay £174.17 for mortgage interest overpaid in 2005–06 although he voluntarily repaid £15,404.07 by April 2009.

=== In opposition: 2010–2024 ===
==== Early opposition career: 2010–2016 ====
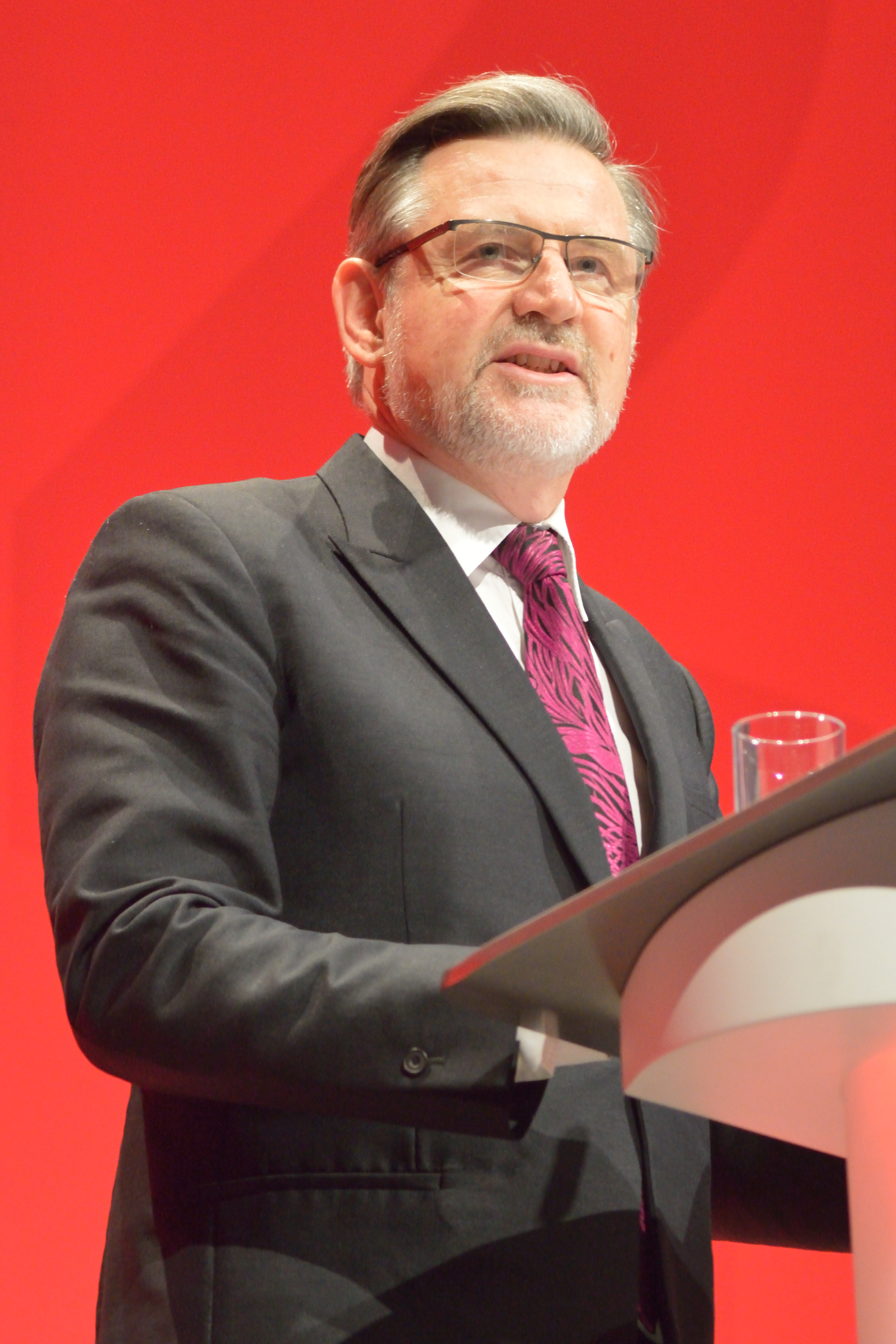
Gardiner giving his speech at the 2016 Labour Party Conference

Gardiner was re-elected at the 2010 general election with a majority of 8,028 votes. Upon his re-election, he was described by Andrew Roth in The Guardian as "One of the best educated and most internationally experienced MPs". He nominated David Miliband in the 2010 Labour Party leadership election.

Between 2011 and 2013, Gardiner served as Ed Miliband's Special Envoy for Environment and Climate Change. In June 2013, Gardiner and Conservative MP Tim Yeo jointly tabled an amendment to the Energy Bill which proposed establishing by 2014 a decarbonisation target for the UK's electricity generating sector, to be achieved by 2030. The amendment was narrowly defeated.

Gardiner was appointed as Shadow Minister for Natural Environment and Fisheries in July 2013. In this role, Gardiner criticised the lack of prosecutions of leading players ten months after David Cameron promised that everything possible would be done to deal with crime relating to the horse meat scandal. "The extraordinary thing is that because of its clout, industry has been able to commit what appears to be a criminal offence – selling the public horsemeat falsely labelled as beef – and just say they are sorry and didn't know". He gave his support in 2014 to the first annual Hen Harrier Day demonstrations in Derbyshire to highlight the illegal persecution of UK raptors. In January 2015, he admitted the push by the previous Labour government to encourage car-buyers to opt for diesel vehicles in a bid to protect the environment was "wrong", identifying that a "massive problem for public health" had been created.

==== Shadow Cabinet: 2016–2020 ====
When Jeremy Corbyn was elected Leader of the Labour Party in September 2015, Gardiner moved to becoming Shadow Minister for the Department of Energy and Climate Change. Following a string of Shadow Cabinet resignations in June 2016, Gardiner replaced Lisa Nandy as Shadow Secretary of State for Energy and Climate Change. In June, the department was abolished and he became Shadow Secretary of State for International Trade and Shadow Minister for International Climate Change.

Gardiner supported the development of Hinkley Point C nuclear power station, rejecting criticism of Chinese involvement in the project despite military and intelligence figures warning ministers that such involvement posed a threat to national security. He urged Theresa May to tell China that Britain wanted strong investment in infrastructure projects and described her decision to halt the deal as "politically stupid" and tantamount to "closing UK Plc down". He criticised May for negotiating a "rip-off deal" over its development.

In October 2017, Gardiner became involved in a complaint by Boeing to the US Department of Commerce. Boeing claimed Bombardier Aerospace was 'dumping' aircraft in the US by selling them below the cost of production, due to large Canadian government subsidies. The US Department had suggested the solution was a 300% tariff on Bombardier CSeries being sold to Delta Air Lines, which would adversely affect prospects for the sale. A major employer in Belfast, a punitive tariff again Bombardier would threaten more than 4,000 manufacturing jobs. Boeing's complaint against Bombardier had made no reference to its own multibillion-dollar tax breaks from Washington state. Gardiner seized on this and accused Boeing of hypocrisy, insisting all aircraft manufacturers require government subsidies; he labelled Boeing "the king of corporate welfare" and a "subsidy junkie", and suggested the company was trying to "crush a competitor". Boeing replied their illegal-subsidies complaint against Bombardier was about selling aircraft below the cost of production and not anti-competitive, saying it merely wanted "fairness" in "following trade rules".

In response to the murder in 2018 of Saudi journalist Jamal Khashoggi, Gardiner said "We must look very carefully again at the relationship we have with Saudi Arabia. What we would do certainly at the moment, and I think the government should do this, is to suspend all arms sales to the kingdom."

In January 2020, Gardiner received India's Padma Shri award for his work in the field of public affairs. He endorsed Rebecca Long-Bailey in the 2020 Labour Party leadership election. Following Keir Starmer's victory in the contest, he was stood down from the Shadow Cabinet in April of that year.

==== Return to the backbenches: 2020–present ====
After following government social distancing guidelines from March to June 2020 during the COVID-19 pandemic, Gardiner joined Black Lives Matter protesters in London as they marched outside Parliament. Since the protest had ignored government guidelines, he took a test for COVID-19 but tested negative for the virus.

On the backbenches, Gardiner began organising a cross-party effort to bring in legislation banning fire-and-rehire practices by employers. In this role, he helped the Labour whips office to organise the defection of Conservative MP Christian Wakeford to the Labour Party in January 2022.

=== Links to Chinese Communist Party agent ===
In 2017 The Times revealed, from September 2015 to February 2017, Gardiner had received £182,284 in disclosed cash donations from Christine Lee & Co, a firm of solicitors which acts as the chief legal adviser to the Chinese embassy. Before this, his constituency party received cash donations from the firm of £22,500 between 2009 and 2015. The paper also revealed part of this money was used to fund the employment of Daniel Wilkes, son of the firm's founder Christine Lee, in his parliamentary offices. Gardiner said the son was hired via an open recruitment process and was appointed on merit. Sir Alistair Graham, former chair of the Committee on Standards in Public Life, called the situation "bizarre" and said "there are clearly questions to be answered". After The Times 2017 piece, Gardiner received a further £200,000 from Lee. Gardiner received a total of £425,000 from Lee.

In January 2022 Lee was declared by MI5 to be an agent working for the United Front Work Department of the Chinese Communist Party, who was covertly "involved in political interference activities in the UK". Lee's son was employed by Gardiner's constituency office until the MI5 classification was announced. The Times said Gardiner generally took a pro-Beijing position in his shadow portfolio dealings, but the donations were disclosed and there was no suggestion of impropriety on Gardiner's part. Gardiner wrote a letter saying the amounts he received were used to fund researchers and Lee had no influence in the appointment or management of these individuals.

== In popular culture ==
Gardiner was portrayed by Kevin McMonagle in the 2024 Amazon Prime Video drama series A Very Royal Scandal.

== Personal life ==
Gardiner is married to Caroline Anne (née) Smith and has employed her as an office manager and executive secretary. Following the 2017 general election, employing family members was banned for new MPs, however the restriction was not retroactive. They have four children; one of whom, Jacob Gardiner-Smith, is a footballer.

== Honours and awards ==
- 2020: Padma Shri of India

Parliament of the United Kingdom
Preceded by Rhodes Boyson	Member of Parliament for Brent North; 1997–present	Incumbent
Political offices
Preceded by Lisa Nandy	Shadow Secretary of State for Energy and Climate Change; 2016	Succeeded by Ed Miliband as Shadow Secretary of State for Climate Change and Net Zero
New office	Shadow Secretary of State for International Trade; 2016–2020	Succeeded by Emily Thornberry
