= Eva Carrillo de García =

María de los Ángeles Guadalupe Eva Carrillo y Gallardo de García (1883–1979), was a Mexican-American missionary, nurse, social-welfare volunteer, and civil-rights activist.

== Background ==
Eva Carrillo de García was born on December 12, 1883, in Los Angeles, California to Teressa Gallardo de Carrillo and Nicanor Luis Carrilo. Before she turned five, her mother died of typhoid fever. Her father remarried. Eva became a ward of the Methodist Church and Dr. Levi Salmans, the first medical Methodist missionary to Mexico. She attended the Colegio Juarez in Guanajuato, Mexico. By 1906, she graduated from Bethany Hospital, a school for nursing in Larned, Kansas. By 1910, she graduated from the Chicago Training School for City, Home, and Foreign Missions. This school was an early branch of Northwestern University. After graduating, she worked as a nurse at the Battle Creek Sanitarium in Michigan, which was the famous Kellogg health facility of the Seventh-day Adventist Church.

At Battle Creek, she met Dr. Alberto G. García. They married in New Orleans, Louisiana on December 6, 1911. They had eight children – Ruissy Eva Garcia, Esperanza Maria Garcia, John Albert Garcia, Alicia Ella Garcia, Martha X. Garcia, Nicanor Garcia, Virginia Garcia and Hermès Garcia. Six of these children attended the University of Texas at Austin.

Mrs. Garcia gave her primary attention to raising her family but still managed to be active in numerous activities – both political and church activities. Having been trained as a nurse, she also worked at the George O. Robinson Orphanage in San Juan, Puerto Rico. She and her husband lived in Central America and Mexico until moving to Austin, Texas in 1915.

== Significance ==
In 1920, Alberto and Eva co-wrote and co-published the first Spanish-language newspaper in Austin, called La Vanguardia. Eva also participated in health/education drives. One of these drives was focused on preventing tuberculosis. As an elder at University Methodist Church, she was an active number of the women’s groups there. She helped found Emmanuel Methodist, the second Mexican Methodist Church in Austin. She organized parties for graduating students. She also worked with youth and collaborated with a city probation officer and juvenile agencies to stop boys and girls from turning to delinquency. In the late 1920s and early 1930s, she taught Spanish to students from Austin Military Academy.

She was active in many clubs, including the League of Women Voters of Texas. In late 1930s, García became a founding member and the president of Ladies LULAC in Austin. She fought to desegregate movie theaters and swimming pools. She also fought to desegregate schools. Together with her husband, she encouraged others to buy property, vote, pay the poll tax, and defend their rights.

The collection of their papers are housed at the Benson Collection at UT Austin. More information: https://legacy.lib.utexas.edu/taro/aushc/00274/00274-P.html

== Death ==
Garcia died on September 26, 1979, and was buried in Capital Memorial Park. In March 1989, Garcia's name and picture were added in a pictorial display at the Capitol in order to mark National Women's History Month. This display, which was sponsored by the Austin Commission for Women, was given, as a gift, to the city of Austin for the 150th anniversary of the city’s founding.
