= Xu Yahui (footballer) =

Chinese footballer

Personal information
- Date of birth: 10 October 1912
- Place of birth: British Malaya
- Position: Midfielder

Senior career*
| Years | Team | Apps | (Gls) |
| 1934–? | C.A.A. | | |
| 1940–? | Sing Tao | | |

International career
| 1920s–1930s | China | | (0) |
- * Club domestic league appearances and goals

Xu Yahui (Chinese: 徐亚辉; born 10 October 1912, date of death unknown) was a Chinese Malaysian footballer. As part of the Chinese national football team he competed at the 1936 Summer Olympics and multiple editions of the Far Eastern Championship Games. Domestically, he has a gold and silver medal in football at the National Games of the Republic of China. During his career, he competed for the Chinese Athletic Association and Sing Tao SC in the Hong Kong First Division League.

== Biography ==
Xu Yahui was born on 10 October 1912 in British Malaya to an ethnic Chinese family that hailed from Xiamen, Fujian. As a footballer, he first competed representing a football team for Malaysian Chinese diaspora footballers and visited Shanghai. There, he studied at Jinan University and was opined by Olympedia as part of the "first generation of keen football players" in China. During the late 1920s and early 1930s, he competed in multiple editions of the Far Eastern Championship Games alongside Chinese Indonesian footballer Chen Zhenhe as part of the China national football team.

In 1933, he represented Shanghai at the 5th National Games of the Republic of China which beat Hong Kong in the finals. The following year, he graduated from the Guangdong Aviation School. Since then, he joined the Chinese Athletic Association football club which competed in the Hong Kong First Division League. He also represented Guangdong at the 6th edition of the National Games held in 1935 though lost in the final against Hong Kong.

As part of the Chinese national football team, he competed at the 1936 Summer Olympics held in Berlin, Germany, as a midfielder but was hampered with injuries. In the first round of the tournament, they went up against Great Britain on 6 August. There, the Chinese team lost by a score 2–0, and was thus eliminated from competition. After the 1936 Summer Games, he remained in Germany and studied radio technology until he graduated in 1940. That same year, he joined Sing Tao SC and toured Australia and China.
