= Coventry Brown =

Scottish footballer (1910–2000)

Personal information
- Date of birth: 28 February 1910
- Place of birth: Scotland
- Date of death: 12 January 2000 (aged 89)
- Place of death: Dudley, England
- Position: Forward

Senior career*
Years	Team	Apps	(Gls)
- RAF Team
- Grantham Town
- Leyton
- Northampton Town

International career
1936	Great Britain Olympic		
- * Club domestic league appearances and goals

Coventry Brown (28 February 1910 – 12 January 2000) was a Scottish footballer who played as a forward. He was part of Great Britain's football squad for the 1936 Summer Olympics.

== Club career ==
He successively played for the RAF Team, Grantham Town, Leyton and Northampton Town.

== International career ==
He was part of Great Britain's football squad for the 1936 Summer Olympics. but did not start for Great Britain in the two games against China and Poland.
