= Jacob Gardiner-Smith =

English footballer

Personal information
- Full name: Jacob Gabriel Gardiner-Smith
- Date of birth: 3 July 1997 (age 29)
- Place of birth: Cambridge, England
- Height: 5 ft 11 in (1.81 m)
- Position: Midfielder

Team information
- Current team: Sholing

Youth career
- 2015–2016: CSKA Moscow
- 2016–2018: Zenit Saint Petersburg

Senior career*
Years	Team	Apps	(Gls)
2018–2019	St Albans City	1	(0)
2019	→ Hendon (dual-reg.)	16	(0)
2019–2020	Wycombe Wanderers	0	(0)
2019–2020	→ Braintree Town (loan)	13	(0)
2022	Hemel Hempstead Town	16	(0)
2022	Cheshunt	4	(0)
2022–2023	Kings Langley	15	(0)
2023	Hanwell Town	8	(0)
2023–2024	Beaconsfield Town	21	(0)
2024	Hungerford Town	16	(0)
2024–	Sholing	9	(0)
- * Club domestic league appearances and goals as of 10:35, 13 January 2025 (UTC)

Jacob Gabriel Gardiner-Smith (born 3 July 1997) is an English semi-professional footballer who plays as a midfielder for Southern Football League side Sholing.

== Early and personal life ==
Born in Cambridge, he is the grandson of Scottish footballer John Gardiner and the son of politician Barry Gardiner. He is fluent in Russian.

== Career ==
He began his career with Russian sides CSKA Moscow and Zenit Saint Petersburg. After two years, he returned to England to sign for St Albans City, moving on to Hendon on dual-registration in January 2019. He turned professional with Wycombe Wanderers in July 2019. He made his senior debut on 8 October 2019, in the EFL Trophy. On 24 December 2019, he moved on a three-month long loan to Braintree Town.

Gardiner-Smith was released by Wycombe Wanderers at the end of the 2019–20 season. He signed for Hemel Hempstead Town in January 2022. In August 2022, Gardiner-Smith was playing for National League South side Cheshunt.

After a spell with Kings Langley Gardiner-Smith signed for Southern Football League side Hanwell Town in January 2023. He joined Beaconsfield Town ahead of the 2023–24 campaign, before signing for league rivals Hungerford Town in January 2024.

In August 2024, Gardiner-Smith joined Southern League Premier Division South side Sholing. He made nine league appearances before suffering a potentially career-ending injury which brought his season to an end in October 2024.

== Career statistics ==
As of match played 16 March 2024

Appearances and goals by club, season and competition
Club	Season	League			FA Cup		EFL Cup		Other		Total	
Club	Season	Division	Apps	Goals	Apps	Goals	Apps	Goals	Apps	Goals	Apps	Goals
St Albans City	2018–19	National League South	1	0	0	0	—		1 (Note: Appearances in the FA Trophy)	0	2	0
Hendon (dual-reg.)	2018–19	Southern League Premier Division South	16	0	—		—		—		16	0
Wycombe Wanderers	2019–20	League One	0	0	0	0	0	0	3 (Note: Appearances in the EFL Trophy)	0	3	0
Braintree Town (loan)	2019–20	National League South	13	0	—		—		—		13	0
Hemel Hempstead Town	2021–22	National League South	16	0	—		—		—		16	0
Cheshunt	2022–23	National League South	4	0	0	0	—		—		4	0
Kings Langley	2022–23	Southern League Premier Division Central	15	0	—		—		3	0	18	0
Hanwell Town	2022–23	Southern League Premier Division South	8	0	—		—		—		8	0
Beaconsfield Town	2023–24	Southern League Premier Division South	21	0	0	0	—		3	0	24	0
Hungerford Town	2023–24	Southern League Premier Division South	9	0	—		—		—		9	0
Career total			103	0	0	0	0	0	10	0	113	0
