= Davilla, Texas =

Unincorporated community in Texas

- Unincorporated community
- Location within Texas Location within the United States
- Coordinates: 30°47′9″N 97°16′30″W
- Country: United States
- State: Texas
- County: Milam
- Elevation: 545 ft (166 m)
- Time zone: UTC-6 (Central (CST))
  - Summer (DST): UTC-5 (CDT)
- Area code: 254
- GNIS feature ID: 1355683

Davilla (/dəˈviːlə/ də-VEE-lə) is an unincorporated community in Milam County, Texas, United States. According to the Handbook of Texas, the community had a population of 200 in 2000.

== History ==
In honor of Miguel Davila, who had obtained the original concession for the land in 1833, the community was established in the 1860s. The property was acquired from the Davila estate by a surveyor by the name of Chamberlin, who then sold town lots with the proviso that no alcoholic beverages should ever be served in the village. A post office was established in 1871. Davilla maintained some level of prosperity even after the Gulf, Colorado and Santa Fe Railway bypassed the town by a distance of several miles in 1881, driving some of the inhabitants elsewhere. Three hundred fifty people lived in the area in the middle of the 1880s, while Davilla had three churches, three gristmills, three cotton gins, and a steam sawmill. From 500 in 1896 to 400 in the 1920s to 300 in the mid-1940s, Davilla's population slowly decreased, starting in the late 1890s. There were only 72 people living there as of the early 1970s, but this decline reversed itself in the 1980s. Five churches and many businesses could be seen on the county highway map from 1988, and the village had 200 residents at the time. Through 2000, Davilla's population was still listed as 200.

2.8% of Davilla's residents were German Americans.

On November 23, 2004, an F0 tornado struck Davilla, damaging a house and another building.

== Geography ==
Davilla is located on Farm to Market Road 487, 18 mi (29 km) west of Cameron and 22 mi (35 km) northwest of Rockdale in western Milam County.

== Education ==
Davilla had its own school in the mid-1880s. In 1903, the community had two schools; one had three teachers and 161 White students, while the other had one teacher and 38 Black students. They even became a school district. It joined the Bartlett Independent School District in June 1964.

== Notable people ==
- Erbie Bowser, Blues pianist and singer.
- William F. Sharp, who served in the 20th Texas Legislature in 1887.

== See also ==
- U.S. Route 190
- Texas State Highway 36
- Texas State Highway 95
- List of Farm to Market Roads in Texas (1300–1399)
