= László Régi =

Hungarian footballer

Personal information
- Nationality: Hungarian
- Born: 13 May 1911
- Died: 1987 (aged 75–76)

Sport
- Sport: Football

László Régi (13 May 1911 – 1987) was a Hungarian international football player. He played for the club BKV Előre SC. He participated with the Hungary national football team at the 1936 Summer Olympics in Berlin.

Régi died in 1987.
