= Kjeld Kjos =

Norwegian footballer (1905-1983)

Personal information
- Date of birth: 31 July 1905
- Place of birth: Bergen, Norway
- Date of death: 2 October 1983 (aged 78)
- Place of death: Bergen, Norway
- Position: Midfielder

International career
Years	Team	Apps	(Gls)
1927–1936	Norway	22	(0)

Kjeld Kjos (31 July 1905 – 2 October 1983) was a Norwegian footballer. He played in 22 matches for the Norway national football team from 1927 to 1936. He was also part of Norway's squad for the football tournament at the 1936 Summer Olympics, but he did not play in any matches.
