= T. D. Bell =

American musician (1922–1999)

Tyler Dee Bell
- Born: December 26, 1922; Belltown, Lee County, Texas, U.S.
- Died: January 9, 1999 (aged 76); Austin, Texas, U.S.
- Other names: T. D. Bell
- Occupation: Blues guitarist

Tyler Dee Bell (December 26, 1922 – January 9, 1999), known as T. D. Bell, was an American blues guitarist.

Bell was born in Belltown, Lee County, Texas. He played some banjo as a child, but played little guitar until after he left the army at the end of World War II. He was heavily influenced by T-Bone Walker and acquired the nickname "Little T-Bone" when he started playing in clubs in the Rockdale area in the late 1940s, alongside Roosevelt "Grey Ghost" Williams. In 1949, club owner Johnny Adams persuaded him to give up his job in an aluminum plant to work as a full-time musician in Austin. He became a successful live performer, often partnering pianist Erbie Bowser; fronting his own band the Cadillacs which toured around the region; and supporting visiting musicians such as B. B. King, Bobby Bland, and T-Bone Walker.

He was a mainstay of the Austin music scene through the 1950s and 1960s, before retiring in the early 1970s and setting up his own trucking business. In the late 1980s he began performing again, and in 1987 formed the Blues Specialists with Bowser. The pair recorded a 1992 album, It's About Time, which was nominated for a W. C. Handy Award, and performed together at Carnegie Hall in 1994. Bell continued to play at festivals and in clubs with the Blues Specialists after Bowser's death in 1995.

Bell was diagnosed with cancer in December 1998, and died in hospital in Austin the following month.
