= Libby Altwerger =

Canadian artist and art educator

Elizabeth Deborah Altwerger (July 13, 1915 – August 11, 1995) was a Canadian artist and art educator.

She was born Elizabeth Deborah Selznick in Toronto and studied art at the Central Technical School there and at the Ontario College of Art, receiving the silver medal for drawing and painting on graduation. Altwerger earned a certificate in recreation from the University of Toronto. She stayed for three years at the University Settlement House as art director. She travelled extensively throughout Europe and North America. She taught art and design at Ryerson Polytechnical Institute for 11 years; she also taught at the Toronto YMCA as well as giving demonstrations at various Toronto art clubs and societies. Her work was displayed at Expo 67.

At the age of 18, she married Ben Altwerger; the couple had a son and a daughter. She began her studies in art once the children were in high school.

Altwerger received a number of awards including a gold medal from the Institut Feminine Culturelle (United Federation of Women) in Vichy, the Sterling Trust award for lithography from the Society of Canadian Painter-Etchers and Engravers (CPE) and at the Ontario Society of Artists show in 1979. Her work is held in the collections of various public and private institutions, including the Art Gallery of Hamilton and the Art Gallery of Windsor.
