= Death of Tyra Hunter =

Transgender person denied emergency medical care

Tyra Hunter
- Born: 1970 or 1971; Culpeper, Virginia, U.S.
- Died: August 7, 1995 (aged 24); District of Columbia General Hospital, Washington, D.C., U.S.
- Cause of death: Blunt trauma sustained in a traffic collision
- Occupation: Hairdresser
- Mother: Margie Hunter

Tyra Hunter (c. 1970 – August 7, 1995) was an African-American hairdresser and transgender woman who died after being injured as a passenger in a car accident. Hunter transitioned at 14 and lived her adult life as a woman. The District of Columbia was found responsible for her death, due to not delivering medical care, and for violations of the DC Human Rights Act during her treatment.

== Accident and death ==
Hunter and her friend Tedessa Rankin were driving to work when they were hit by another car on the corner of 50th St SE & C St SE, a block away from where she lived, in the neighborhood of Marshall Heights. The other car was going twice the speed limit and had run a traffic light. The driver of the car, which was stolen, fled. Gerald Jay Johnson, the 21 year old driving the car that hit her, was charged with negligent homicide.

According to witnesses, a male firefighter helping Hunter stopped and backed away laughing upon discovering that she had a penis, and saying "this bitch ain't no girl...it's a nigger, he's got a dick". Two other witnesses corroborated the comment, but the description of the technician varied. He continued derogatory comments and joking with other firefighters while leaving her untreated. Bystanders requested them to resume treatment, but they did not do so until a supervisor arrived three to seven minutes later. Fire department officials disputed these, saying that medics never stopped treating her and, while a derogatory comment was made, she couldn't have been saved. Otis J. Latin Sr., the D.C. fire chief, said that they couldn't determine who made the comment, and nobody was disciplined.

ER staff at DC General Hospital subsequently "failed to diagnose Hunter's injuries and follow nationally accepted standards of care." Hunter died about an hour after arriving, and two hours after the crash.

The D.C. fire department opened two cases to investigate her treatment. The second one was opened in December after fire department officials acknowledged that the first investigation was inadequate, but blamed "pressure to produce results from the gay community" for the speed of the first one.

A candlelight vigil was held in front of a D.C. fire department on September 20, with over 200 demonstrators. Over 2,000 people attended her funeral, in which she was buried as a woman. Almost all of them were African American. Some attendants wore shirts with an image of her and text reading "God's Gift". A second vigil was held on October 4 in front of Marion Barry's office, the mayor of D.C at the time.

== Early life ==
By the time [s]he was 13, I knew [s]he was going to be gay. I would buy [her] guns and trains, and [s]he played with girl's dolls. [She] didn't want to play sports; [s]he wanted to model clothes for [her] aunt. [She]'d rather do [her] sister's hair than roughhouse with the boys.

— Margie Hunter

Tyra Hunter was born in Culpeper, Virginia and raised by her mother, Margie Hunter, and her sister, Linette. Her father left when she was 7. She grew up in the Southeast neighborhood of D.C. and at 15, she came out to her mom that she was gay and trans. Her family supported her transition and began viewing her as a girl, though they continued to use masculine pronouns and her dead name. She received gender-affirming care and began saving for gender-affirming surgery. She worked as a hairdresser at several places.

== Lawsuit ==
Margie Hunter filed a $10 million lawsuit in February 1996, alleging that the EMTs and Dr. Joseph Bastien failed to do their jobs to save Tyra Hunter's life.

The case against the District of Columbia was tried by Richard F. Silber. Dana Priesing, a transgender activist observing the trial, wrote that the evidence supported "the inference that a stereotype (namely that Hunter was an anonymous, drug-using, transgender street person) affected the treatment Tyra received," and that the "ER staff, as evidenced by their actions, did not consider her life worth saving." Adrian Williams, one of the EMTs who had neglected to treat Hunter, testified that he assumed she was a man on sight, "failing to notice that she had breasts, make-up, women's clothing, a woman's hairstyle, and white nail polish." One DC General employee, after being subpoenaed, left for Africa and did not return until late December 1998. In the end, none of the EMTs involved were ever disciplined.

On December 11, 1998, a jury awarded Margie Hunter almost $2.3 million after finding the District of Columbia, through its employees in the DC Fire Department and doctors at DC General, liable under the DC Human Rights Act and for negligence and medical malpractice for causing Hunter's death. $600,000 was awarded for damages attributable to violations of the DC Human Rights Act associated with the withdrawal of medical care at the accident scene and openly denigrating Hunter with epithets, a further $1.5 million was awarded to her mother for Hunter's conscious pain and suffering and for economic loss from the wrongful death medical malpractice claim. Doctors at DC General failed to diagnose and treat Hunter who died of internal bleeding in the hospital emergency room. Evidence at the trial demonstrated that had Hunter been provided with a blood transfusion and referred to a surgeon, she would have had an 86% chance of surviving. In subsequent negotiations the case was settled for $1.75m.

== Legacy ==
Genny Beemyn writes that Hunter's death "significantly changed attitudes towards trans people and became a defining moment" for LGBT rights organizations in the United States, especially in Washington, D.C. Coverage of her death in The Washington Post "persistently mischaracterized Hunter's gender identity", and resulted in a small demonstration in September 1995 outside the paper's headquarters.

Transgender Youth Resources and Advocacy (TYRA) was a program of the former Illinois Gender Advocates, and Howard Brown Health Center was a Chicago area transgender youth initiative named in the memory of Tyra Hunter.

== See also ==
- Brandon Teena
- Murder of Gwen Araujo
- Transphobia
- Misogynoir
- List of transgender-related topics
- Violence against LGBT people
- Transgender genocide
