= Fuat Göztepe =

Turkish footballer (1912–1991)

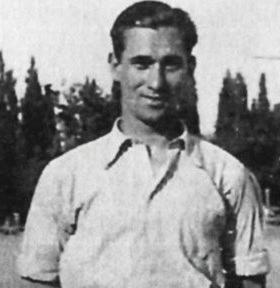

Personal information
- Date of birth: 16 June 1912
- Place of birth: İzmir
- Date of death: 13 April 1992 (aged 79)
- Place of death: İzmir
- Position: Forward

Youth career
- Altay

Senior career*
| Years | Team | Apps | (Gls) |
- Altay; Göztepe
- * Club domestic league appearances and goals

Fuat Göztepe (16 June 1912 – 13 April 1992) was a Turkish footballer, who played for Altay and Göztepe. He was also part of Turkey's squad at the 1936 Summer Olympics, but he did not play in any matches. He was born and died in İzmir.
