= John Gardiner (footballer, born 1911) =

Scottish footballer (1911–1965)

Personal information
- Full name: John Flannegan Gardiner
- Date of birth: 23 December 1911
- Place of birth: Bridgeton, Scotland
- Date of death: 10 October 1965 (aged 53)
- Place of death: Glasgow, Scotland
- Height: 5 ft 9 in (1.75 m)
- Position: Half back

Senior career*
Years	Team	Apps	(Gls)
1930–1937	Queen's Park	170	(0)

International career
1932–1937	Scotland Amateurs	13	(0)
1936	Great Britain	2	(0)
- * Club domestic league appearances and goals

John Flannegan Gardiner (23 December 1911 – 10 October 1965), sometimes known as Jackie Gardiner, was a Scottish footballer who represented Great Britain at the 1936 Summer Olympics.

== Career ==
Gardiner played amateur football for Queen's Park, joining in 1930 from John Street School in Bridgeton. He embarked on a tour of Norway with the club in 1933. During his time with Queen's Park, he represented the Scottish amateur national team in games against England, Wales and Ireland.

He retired from playing due to a cruciate ligament injury.

During the 1936 Olympic Games, he represented Great Britain twice, his debut came in a 2–0 victory over China and his final game against Poland in a 5–4 loss. During the game against Poland he was booed by the crowd for body charging several players and knocking over Polish left winger Hubert Gad at a time when Great Britain were losing 5–1.

In the 1950s and 1960s, he was general manager of the Kelvin Hall exhibition centre in Glasgow. He died in 1965 from lung cancer. His son is Barry Gardiner, a politician, while grandson Jacob Gardiner-Smith is also a footballer.

Gardiner returned to Queen's Park after his playing career and taught a young Alex Ferguson, Ferguson had complained that an opponent had bitten him during the game and Gardiner told Ferguson to "bite him back". Gardiner became president of the club in the 1960s.
