= Jack Burns (Australian footballer) =

Australian rules footballer

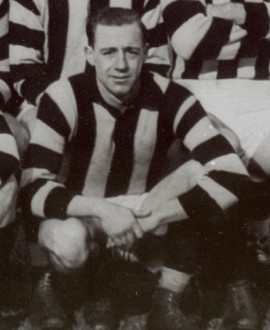
- Burns in 1944

Personal information
- Full name: Jack Burns
- Born: 6 October 1918
- Died: 24 August 1995 (aged 76)
- Original team: Ivanhoe Amateurs
- Height: 170 cm (5 ft 7 in)
- Weight: 66 kg (146 lb)
- Position: Wing

Playing career^{1}
Years	Club	Games (Goals)
1941–47	Collingwood	92 (14)
- ^{1} Playing statistics correct to the end of 1947.

Jack Burns (6 October 1918 – 24 August 1995) was an Australian rules footballer who played with Collingwood in the Victorian Football League (VFL).
