= Huang Meishun =

Chinese footballer

Personal information
- Date of birth: 6 November 1907
- Place of birth: Guangzhou, China

International career
Years	Team	Apps	(Gls)
- China

Huang Meishun (born 6 November 1907, date of death unknown) was a Chinese footballer. He competed in the men's tournament at the 1936 Summer Olympics.

He disappeared in 1938.
