= Jack Carter (cricketer) =

Australian cricketer

Personal information
- Full name: William Jack Sydney Carter
- Born: 7 December 1907; Sydney, Australia
- Died: 19 August 1995 (aged 87); Penshurst, New South Wales, Australia
- Source: ESPNcricinfo, 24 December 2016

Jack Carter (7 December 1907 – 19 August 1995) was an Australian cricketer. He played one first-class match for New South Wales in 1928/29.

== See also ==
- List of New South Wales representative cricketers
