= Bill Deague =

Australian rules footballer, born 1912

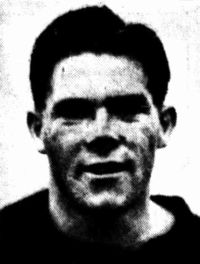

Personal information
- Full name: William Henry Deague
- Born: 14 October 1912; North Perth, Western Australia
- Died: 31 August 1995 (aged 82); Queensland
- Original team: Alphington
- Height: 183 cm (6 ft 0 in)
- Weight: 82 kg (181 lb)
- Position: Follower

Playing career^{1}
Years	Club	Games (Goals)
1932–36	Melbourne	56 (11)
1937–39	Hawthorn	43 (35)
Total		99 (46)
- ^{1} Playing statistics correct to the end of 1939.

William Henry Deague (14 October 1912 – 31 August 1995) was an Australian rules footballer who played with Melbourne and Hawthorn in the Victorian Football League (VFL).

Finding a lack of opportunities at Melbourne, Deague was cleared to Hawthorn. Deague subsequently left Hawthorn for the seaside town of Warrnambool.
