= Lajos Bonyhai =

Hungarian footballer

Personal information
- Date of birth: 29 June 1913
- Place of birth: Kassa, Austria-Hungary
- Date of death: 16 March 1976 (aged 62)
- Place of death: Miskolc, Hungary

International career
Years	Team	Apps	(Gls)
- Hungary

Lajos Bonyhai (29 June 1913 – 16 March 1976) was a Hungarian footballer. He competed in the men's tournament at the 1936 Summer Olympics.
