= Frederick Riley (footballer) =

English footballer

Personal information
- Date of birth: 9 January 1912
- Place of birth: Manchester, England
- Date of death: 7 December 1942 (aged 30)
- Place of death: Desvres, France

Senior career*
| Years | Team | Apps | (Gls) |
- Casuals

International career
| 1936 | Great Britain | 1 | (0) |
- * Club domestic league appearances and goals

Frederick Riley (9 January 1912 – 7 December 1942) was an English footballer who represented Great Britain at the 1936 Summer Olympics. Riley played amateur football for Casuals. He was killed when his plane was shot down over France during World War II.

== Personal life ==
Riley enlisted in the Royal Air Force in February 1939, and was transferred to active service soon after the start of the Second World War. As part of No. 263 Squadron, he took part in the Battle of Britain flying Supermarine Spitfires. On 7 December 1942, Riley, by then a Flight Lieutenant, was shot down and killed during a reconnaissance mission over France. He was buried at Boulogne Eastern Cemetery.
