= Jakob Eckert =

German footballer

Personal information
- Date of birth: 18 October 1916
- Place of birth: Monsheim, Germany
- Date of death: 5 June 1940 (aged 23)
- Place of death: Villers-Carbonnel, France
- Position: Forward

Senior career*
Years	Team	Apps	(Gls)
- Wormatia Worms

International career
1937	Germany	1	(0)
- * Club domestic league appearances and goals

Jakob Eckert (18 October 1916 – 5 June 1940) was a German international footballer. He was part of Germany's squad at the 1936 Summer Olympics, but he did not play in any matches.

== Personal life ==
A Gefreiter in the German army, Eckert served in World War II, and died on 5 June 1940 in Villers-Carbonnel, France at the age of 23.
