= Frank Greinert =

American soccer player

Personal information
- Date of birth: February 5, 1909
- Date of death: November 9, 1965 (aged 56)
- Place of death: United States

Senior career*
Years	Team	Apps	(Gls)
- Philadelphia German-Americans

International career
1936	United States	1	(0)
- * Club domestic league appearances and goals

Frank Greinert (February 5, 1909 – November 9, 1965) was a U.S. soccer player who was a member of the U.S. soccer team at the 1936 Summer Olympics. At the time, he played for the Philadelphia German-Americans of the American Soccer League.
