= Park Dae-jong =

South Korean footballer

Personal information
- Date of birth: 21 January 1917
- Place of birth: Seoul, South Korea
- Date of death: 16 August 1995 (aged 78)

International career
Years	Team	Apps	(Gls)
- South Korea

Park Dae-jong (21 January 1917 – 16 August 1995) was a South Korean footballer. He competed in the men's tournament at the 1948 Summer Olympics.
