= Erbie Bowser =

American blues pianist and singer

Erbie Bowser (May 5, 1918 – August 15, 1995) was an American blues pianist and singer.

Bowser was born in Davilla, Texas, moving with his parents to Palestine, Texas as a child. He grew up in a musical family, and learned piano, joining the North Carolina Cotton Pickers Review in his teens. On leaving school he joined the Sunset Royal Entertainers and toured Texas, before enlisting in 1942 and joining the military in Europe and north Africa. He was a member of the Special Services Band, and played USO shows. After returning to Texas, he worked in construction and for two years attended Jarvis Christian College in Hawkins. Around 1949 he married and moved to Odessa, Texas, where he worked for a drilling company. There, he formed a musical partnership with guitarist T. D. Bell, and the pair performed together at clubs in west Texas and New Mexico.

Bowser moved to Austin in the mid-1950s, and played in local bands. When Bell also moved to the city around 1960, the pair resumed playing together at clubs, notably the Victory Grill, and joined with other local musicians including Roosevelt "Grey Ghost" Williams to form the Blues Specialists. The group performed regularly in and around Austin through the 1960s and 1970s. Bowser "incorporated big band, barrelhouse, and Southern boogie-woogie into a very distinctive sound". After a break of a few years, Bowser and Bell resumed playing together, and recorded an album, It's About Time, in 1992. The album was nominated for a W. C. Handy Award. Both as a solo performer and with Bell, Bowser then began appearing at blues festivals, and at Carnegie Hall, and reconvened the Blues Specialists for regular club performances.

Bowser died of cancer in Austin in 1995.
