= Pál Lágler =

Hungarian footballer

Personal information
- Nationality: Hungarian
- Born: 8 October 1913
- Died: Unknown

Sport
- Sport: Football

Pál Lágler (born 8 October 1913, date of death unknown) was a Hungarian international football player. He played for the Magyar Pamutipari Sport Club. He participated with the Hungary national football team at the 1936 Summer Olympics in Berlin.
