= List of Penang FC honours =

Penang Football Association, now simply known as Penang FC or Penang, is a football team based in George Town, Penang. Penang plays in the Malaysian football representing the state of Penang, Malaysia. They are currently play in the Malaysia Super League. Their home stadium is City Stadium (Malay:Stadium Bandaraya). This stadium is famed for its vociferous home support dubbed the "Keramat Roar". The team has won 15 major trophies in Malaysian football. Domestically they have won 3 Malaysia Super League titles, 4 Malaysia Cup, 1 Malaysia FA Cup, 1 Malaysia Charity Shield, 1 Malaysia Premier League and 5 Malaysia FAM League. They also had won Aga Khan Gold Cup in 1976.

== Domestic Achievement ==
- Malaysia Cup/HMS Malaya Cup
  - Winners (4): 1953, 1954, 1958, 1974
  - Runners-up (9): 1934, 1941, 1950, 1952, 1962, 1963, 1968, 1969, 1977
- Malaysia Super League/First Division
  - Winners (3): *1982, 1998, 2001
  - Runners-up (3): 1983, 1999, 2000
- Malaysia Premier League/Second Division
  - Winners (1): 2020
  - Runners-up (1): 1992, 2015
- Malaysia FAM League/Third Division
  - Winners (5): *1952, 1955, 1956, 1957, 2013
  - Runners-up (3): 1961, 1962, 1968
- Malaysia FA Cup
  - Winners (1): 2002
  - Runners-up (2): 1997, 2000
- Malaysia Charity Shield
  - Winners (1): 2003
  - Runners-up (0):

(*inaugural winners)

== Other Domestic Achievements ==
- Malaysia King's Gold Cup
  - Winners (9): 1951, 1956, 1966, 1968, 1969, 1986, 1998, 2002, 2017
  - Runners-up (12): 1947, 1950, 1955, 1958, 1960, 1962, 1964, 1965, 1975, 1983, 1993, 2008
- Malaysia Agong Cup
  - Winners (2): 1998, 2002
  - Runners-up (4): 1983, 1999, 2000, 2001

== Preseason Achievements ==
- Penang TYT Cup
  - Winners (1): 2022
- Hope Cup
  - Winners (1): 2023

== Youth Achievement ==
- Malaysia President Cup
  - Winners (1): 2004
  - Runners-up (1): 2015

== Achievement In AFC ==
- AFC Champions League
  - Winners (0):
  - Runners-up (0):
- AFC Cup
  - Winners (0):
  - Runners-up (0):

== Other Achievement In Asian ==
- Aga Khan Gold Cup (Note: The competition is widely regarded as the predecessor of AFC Champions League (held for the first time in 1967), since it was the first organized international competition that involved club teams around Asia, organized by the football authorities of East Pakistan, in collaboration with Asian Football Confederation (AFC).)
  - Winners (1): 1976
  - Runners-up (0):

== See also ==
- Penang FC
