= Di Prisco =

Di Prisco is a surname. Notable people with the surname include:

- Joseph Di Prisco (born 1950), Italian-American poet, novelist, memoirist, book reviewer, and teacher
- Rom Di Prisco (born 1972), Canadian video game composer and producer
