= Victor Majérus =

Luxembourgish footballer

Personal information
- Date of birth: 26 March 1913
- Place of birth: Esch-sur-Alzette, Luxembourg
- Date of death: 10 June 1978 (aged 65)
- Place of death: Luxembourg, Luxembourg

International career
Years	Team	Apps	(Gls)
- Luxembourg

Victor Majérus (26 March 1913 – 10 June 1978) was a Luxembourgish footballer. He competed in the men's tournament at the 1936 Summer Olympics.
