= William Voisey =

English footballer and manager

Personal information
- Full name: William Voisey
- Date of birth: 19 November 1891
- Place of birth: Poplar, England
- Date of death: 19 October 1964 (aged 72)
- Place of death: Leytonstone, England
- Positions: Wing half; full back

Senior career*
Years	Team	Apps	(Gls)
1906–1907	Glengall Rovers		
1907–1908	St John's		
1908–1923	Millwall		
1923–1924	Bournemouth & Boscombe Athletic	26	(2)
- Leytonstone

International career
1919	England (wartime)	1	(0)

Managerial career
- 1936: Great Britain
- 1940–1944: Millwall
- * Club domestic league appearances and goals

William Voisey DCM MM (19 November 1891 – 19 October 1964) was an English professional footballer who played as a wing half for Millwall in the Football League and later managed the club during the Second World War. He managed the Great Britain team at the 1936 Summer Olympics. He was nicknamed 'Banger'.

== Playing career ==
Voisey began his career with local Isle of Dogs clubs Glengall Rovers and St John's, before joining Southern League First Division club Millwall in 1908. He remained with the club through the First World War and was capped by England in a wartime fixture in 1919. He was a non-playing reserve for competitive England matches in October 1919 and May 1921 and was a member of the FA XI which toured South Africa in 1920. Voisey played in Millwall's first three seasons of league football after the war, before transferring to newly-elected Third Division South club Bournemouth & Boscombe Athletic in 1923. He ended his playing career in non-League football with Leytonstone. In 2015, a housing block at the Frank Whipple Estate in Tower Hamlets was named Bill Voisey Court in his honour.

== Managerial and coaching career ==
After retiring from football, Voisey held the position of trainer at Leytonstone, Fulham and Millwall. He managed the Great Britain team to the quarter-finals of the 1936 Summer Olympics and later managed Millwall during the Second World War. In 1941, at the age of 50, he named himself in the lineup as a player for a London War Cup match versus West Ham United. After sustaining injuries during an air raid in April 1943 (in which The Den received a direct hit), Voisey was forced to relinquish his management role in November 1944.

== Personal life ==
Voisey was married with five children, two of whom died in infancy. One son, Harry, became a footballer and made appearances for Millwall during the Second World War. Voisey served as a sergeant in the Royal Field Artillery during the First World War and was awarded the Distinguished Conduct Medal, the Military Medal, the Croix de guerre during the course of his service and was mentioned in dispatches. His DCM citation reads:

He (Voisey) came to France with the Division, has frequently acted as Battery Sgt. Major and invariably displayed marked resource, particularly during the retirement after 21 March 1918 when the Battery sustained many casualties from hostile fire. His fine example and disregard of danger contributed largely to the withdrawal of men and guns. Has always set a fine example of courage and cheerfulness to all ranks.

== Career statistics ==
Appearances and goals by club, season and competition
Club	Season	League			FA Cup		Total	
Club	Season	Division	Apps	Goals	Apps	Goals	Apps	Goals
Millwall	1920–21	Third Division	30	1	1	0	31	1
Millwall	1921–22	Third Division South	42	2	5	0	47	2
Millwall	1922–23	Third Division South	7	0	0	0	7	0
Career total			78	3	6	0	84	3
