= Mihály Csutorás =

Hungarian footballer

Personal information
- Date of birth: 7 March 1912
- Date of death: 7 April 1956 (aged 44)

Senior career*
Years	Team	Apps	(Gls)
- Herminamezei AC

International career
- Hungary
- * Club domestic league appearances and goals

Mihály Csutorás (7 March 1912 − 7 April 1956) was a Hungarian international football player. He played for the club Herminamezei AC. He participated with the Hungary national football team at the 1936 Summer Olympics in Berlin.
