= Hans-Jürgen Dollheiser =

German field hockey player

Hans-Jürgen Dollheiser (29 September 1928 – 27 August 1995) is a German former field hockey player who competed in the 1952 Summer Olympics.
