= Li Tiansheng =

Chinese footballer

Personal information
- Date of birth: 4 April 1906
- Place of birth: Causeway Bay, Hong Kong

International career
Years	Team	Apps	(Gls)
- China

Li Tiansheng (born 4 April 1906, date of death unknown) was a Chinese footballer. He competed in the men's tournament at the 1936 Summer Olympics.
