= Víctor Marchena =

Peruvian footballer (1914–1981)

Personal information
- Full name: Víctor Manuel Marchena Navarro
- Date of birth: 22 September 1914
- Place of birth: Callao, Peru
- Date of death: 6 June 1981 (aged 66)
- Position: Goalkeeper

Senior career*
Years	Team	Apps	(Gls)
1934–1939	Sport Boys		
1940–1941	Atlético Chalaco		
1942–1945	Sport Boys		

International career
1938	Peru	1	(0)
Medal record
Men's football
Representing Peru
Bolivarian Games
Gold medal – first place	1938 Bogotá
- * Club domestic league appearances and goals

Víctor Manuel Marchena Navarro (22 September 1914 – 6 June 1981) was a Peruvian professional footballer who played as goalkeeper.

== Playing career ==
Víctor Marchena is one of the most iconic goalkeepers of Sport Boys of Callao, his hometown. He won the Peruvian championship twice there in the 1930s (1935 and 1937). After a brief stint with Atlético Chalaco, Sport Boys' arch-rival, he returned to the latter club in 1942 and won his third championship. He remained there until 1945, the year he retired.

A Peruvian international, Víctor Marchena participated in the 1936 Berlin Olympics as Juan Valdivieso's backup. In 1938, he won the Bolivarian Games with Peru, earning his only cap for the national team, against Ecuador on 11 August 1938 (a 9–1 victory).

== Honours ==
Sport Boys

- Peruvian Primera División (3): 1935, 1937, 1942

Peru

- Bolivarian Games: 1938
