= Frank Kendrick (footballer) =

Australian rules footballer

Personal information
- Full name: Francis Horace Kendrick
- Born: 29 March 1914; South Melbourne, Victoria
- Died: 11 August 1995 (aged 81)
- Height: 173 cm (5 ft 8 in)
- Weight: 69 kg (152 lb)

Playing career^{1}
Years	Club	Games (Goals)
1937	South Melbourne	2 (0)
- ^{1} Playing statistics correct to the end of 1937.

Francis Horace Kendrick (29 March 1914 – 11 August 1995) was an Australian rules footballer who played with South Melbourne in the Victorian Football League (VFL).
