= Wagih El-Kashef =

Egyptian footballer (1909–1973)

Personal information
- Full name: Ahmed Waigh El-Kashef
- Date of birth: 5 February 1909
- Place of birth: Egypt
- Date of death: 1973 (aged 63–64)
- Position: Forward

Senior career*
Years	Team	Apps	(Gls)
- Al-Ahly S.C.

International career
- Egypt
- * Club domestic league appearances and goals

Ahmed Wagih El-Kashef (5 February 1909 – 1973) was an Egyptian football forward who played for Egypt in the 1934 FIFA World Cup. He also played for Al Ahly SC and Zamalek SC, and represented Egypt at the 1936 Summer Olympics.
