= Erkki Gustafsson =

Finnish footballer (1912-1966)

Personal information
- Date of birth: 31 December 1912
- Place of birth: Helsinki, Finland
- Date of death: 13 January 1966 (aged 53)
- Place of death: Helsinki, Finland
- Position: Inside forward

Senior career*
Years	Team	Apps	(Gls)
1931	Helsingin Kalervo		
1931-1936	Helsingin Toverit		(19)
1937	Helsingin Palloseura	9	(0)
1938-1941	Helsingin Toverit	39	(14)
- Helsingin Jyry

International career
1938–1939	Finland	2	(0)
1936	Finland Olympic	1	(0)
- * Club domestic league appearances and goals

Erkki Gustafsson (31 December 1912 – 13 January 1966) was a Finnish footballer. He competed in the men's tournament at the 1936 Summer Olympics. He played mostly for Helsingin Toverit, scoring 30 goals for them in 87 matches in Mestaruussarja. He also played for a number of other Helsinki based teams in his career.
