= Reg Date =

Australian soccer player (1921–1995)

Personal information
- Full name: Reginald Date
- Date of birth: 26 July 1921
- Place of birth: Wallsend, New South Wales, Australia
- Date of death: 11 August 1995 (aged 74)
- Position: Forward

Youth career
- 1930–1938: Plattsburg Public School

Senior career*
Years	Team	Apps	(Gls)
1938–1944	Wallsend	107	(166)
1945–1947	Canterbury Bankstown	39	(94)
1948–1954	Wallsend	93	(154)
Total		239	(414)

International career
1947	Australia	5	(8)
- * Club domestic league appearances and goals

Reg Date (26 July 1921 – 11 August 1995) was an Australian soccer player who plied his trade after the Second World War. Date played for Wallsend Football Club and Canterbury-Bankstown. He represented Australia in five full international matches, captaining three times.

== Early life ==
Date was born in Wallsend to Nancy and John "Mick" Date. His father was a fisherman at Lemon Tree Passage, where Date lived until the age of eight, when he moved to live in Wallsend with his mother's parents.

== Club career ==
Date went to Plattsburg Public School in Wallsend, being a prolific goalscorer in their youth matches; he even claimed that he had scored a total of 1,616 career goals including junior football, although there is no evidence of such. He made his debut for Wallsend Football Club in 1938 as a 16-year-old. He joined Canterbury-Bankstown in the state league in 1945. Date continued to live in Wallsend, commuting by train every weekend. In 1948, Date returned to Wallsend. In time he was coached by the great Alf Quill, Wallsend Football Club's legendary goalscorer of the inter-war years.

At his peak Date was an incredible goal scorer for Canterbury-Bankstown in the New South Wales Division 1, earning state and international recognition and captaining Australia in three matches against South Africa in a five-game home series against that nation; Date scoring eight goals. He scored another three in two warm-up matches for the 'B' side prior to the official tour.

There was consternation when Date, for whatever reason, was not selected on international tours of New Zealand in 1948 and, most surprisingly, South Africa in 1950, but he did score in a representative match on the national side's return from the Cape for New South Wales against Australia on 2 September 1950 and did appear for the 'B' side in the famous 17–0 defeat to an English XI on 30 June 1951.

== Legacy ==
In 2000, he was selected as a member of the Australian team of the century by respondents to an RSSSF vote, beating Frank Farina into second place for the number 10 shirt.

== Later life ==
Date worked for years running hotels in the Newcastle area. He became the publican of the Queens Arms Hotel in Maitland in 1947, moving to the Ocean View Hotel in Dudley the next year. In 1954, Date took over the Albion Hotel in Wickham, where he worked until his retirement in 1980. In a 2012 interview with The Sydney Morning Herald, his Australia teammate Joe Marston rated Date as the best Australian player that he had played with or against, adding, "Great player. Great bloke. But boy he could drink. The selectors, they never liked Reggie. He was too much of a larrikin. They couldn't handle him."

== Career statistics ==
=== Club ===
Appearances and goals by club, season, and competition. Only official games are included in this table.
Club	Season	League		State Premiership		State League Cup		Other		Total	
Club	Season	Apps	Goals	Apps	Goals	Apps	Goals	Apps	Goals	Apps	Goals
Wallsend	1938	4	8	2	3	3	5	1	1	10	17
Wallsend	1939	21	19	1	0	0	0	1	2	23	21
Wallsend	1940	21	21	1	3	1	0	1	0	24	24
Wallsend	1941	17	15	2	1	2	1	1	1	22	18
Wallsend	1942	14	39	3	3	4	1	3	6	24	49
Wallsend	1943	14	23	4	11	1	4	2	4	21	42
Wallsend	1944	22	41	1	3	4	7	4	10	31	61
Canterbury Bankstown	1945	14	32	3	3	2	6	1	2	20	43
Canterbury Bankstown	1946	13	29	2	5	5	13	5	10	25	57
Canterbury Bankstown	1947	15	33	0	0	7	16	1	0	23	49
Wallsend	1948	9	13	0	0	3	8	1	1	13	22
Wallsend	1949	18	29	2	3	2	4	3	5	25	41
Wallsend	1950	18	24	2	4	3	0	3	0	26	28
Wallsend	1951	22	38	2	6	2	4	3	6	30	54
Wallsend	1952	8	24	6	5	4	7	1	3	19	41
Wallsend	1953	11	16	5	3	1	2	4	5	21	26
Wallsend	1954	8	10	0	0	0	0	0	0	8	10
Wallsend	Total	231	414	36	53	39	78	34	56	340	601

=== International ===
National team	Year	Competitive		Friendly		Total	
National team	Year	Apps	Goals	Apps	Goals	Apps	Goals
Australia	1947	0	0	5	8	5	8

List of international goals scored by Reg Date
No.	Date	Venue	Opponent	Score	Result	Competition	Ref.
1	10 May 1947	Sydney Cricket Ground, Sydney, Australia	South Africa	1–0	1–2	Friendly	
2	24 May 1947	Brisbane Cricket Ground, Brisbane, Australia	South Africa	1–0	2–4	Friendly	
3	24 May 1947	Brisbane Cricket Ground, Brisbane, Australia	South Africa	2–3	2–4	Friendly	
4	31 May 1947	Sydney Cricket Ground, Sydney, Australia	South Africa	2–1	3–3	Friendly	
5	31 May 1947	Sydney Cricket Ground, Sydney, Australia	South Africa	3–1	3–3	Friendly	
6	31 May 1947	Newcastle Sports Ground, Newcastle, Australia	South Africa	1–0	5–1	Friendly	
7	31 May 1947	Newcastle Sports Ground, Newcastle, Australia	South Africa	4–1	5–1	Friendly	
8	31 May 1947	Newcastle Sports Ground, Newcastle, Australia	South Africa	5–1	5–1	Friendly	

== Honours ==
Wallsend

- NSW State League: 1938, 1941, 1942, 1943, 1944, 1951, 1953
- NSW State League Cup: 1942, 1944, 1950, 1952
- NSW Robinson Cup: 1938, 1939
- NSW Daniels Cup: 1940, 1941, 1942, 1943, 1949, 1950, 1951,

Canterbury

- NSW State League: 1945
- NSW State League Cup: 1946
- NSW Sydney Cup: 1946

Individual

- NSW Top Scorer: 1942, 1945, 1946, 1947, 1951, 1952, 1953
