= Ludmilla Pajo =

Albanian writer and journalist

Ludmilla Pajo (December 21, 1947 – August 25, 1995) was a Moscow-born Albanian writer and journalist.

== Life ==
Ludmilla Pajo was born in Moscow, Soviet Union. Her parents (Ramiz Xhabija and Adile Xhabija) were pursuing their studies in Moscow at that time. Her father Ramiz was one of the most important engineers known in Albania and her mother Adile was an educator and women's rights activist. They returned to Albania when Ludmilla was 6 years old. She lived in Kuçovë until the age of 18 when she moved to Tirana to pursue her college degree in journalism.

As a young journalist she worked for the most important newspaper at the time in Albania, Zëri i Popullit. Later she worked for the Ylli magazine until 1991. She worked for the Ministry of Defence from 1991 to 1995. She was married and had two children. She died at the age of 47.

Pajo was also a spokesman for the Ministry of Public Order.

She wrote 13 books for children and adults and numerous articles on the main journals and magazines in Albania. Her last book Waiting for You was published posthumously by her husband, Mezin Pajo, a Professor of Arts.

== Major works ==
- Sinqerisht (Sincerely) 1968;
- Ditet e javes u zemeruan me Erindin (The days of week got angry at Erind);
- Nje Kenge ne Pranvere (A Song in Spring);
- Shoket e mi (My Friends);
- Trima e te Vendosur (Vol. 5) (Brave and Courageous, Vol.5);
- Pse humbi celesi? (Why did the key get lost?);
- Dardardhja e madhe;
- Duke te Pritur Ty (Waiting for you).
