= József Berta =

Hungarian footballer

Personal information
- Nationality: Hungarian
- Born: 25 October 1912 Szigetvár, Hungary
- Died: 9 April 1981 (aged 68) Vaison-la-Romaine, France

Sport
- Sport: Football
- Club: Tokodi Üveggyári SC

József Berta (25 October 1912 – 9 April 1981) was a Hungarian international football player. He was born in Szigetvár, and played for the club Tokodi Üveggyári SC. He participated with the Hungary national football team at the 1936 Summer Olympics in Berlin. He died in Vaison-la-Romaine, France in 1981.
