= Andrew Guyda =

American soccer player (1907–1956)

Personal information
- Full name: Andrew W. Guyda
- Birth name: Andrew Gajda
- Date of birth: February 26, 1907
- Place of birth: Manchester, New Hampshire, U.S.
- Date of death: June 4, 1956 (aged 49)
- Place of death: Waltham, Massachusetts, U.S.
- Position: Forward

Senior career*
Years	Team	Apps	(Gls)
1926–19??	Revere Corinthians		
- Boston Soccer Club
- Thornton Victorias
- Boston Celtics
- Lusitano Recs

International career
1936	United States	1	(0)

Managerial career
- Harvard Crimson (assistant)
- Harvard Crimson (freshmen)
- * Club domestic league appearances and goals

Andrew W. "Poly" Guyda (born Andrew Gajda; February 26, 1907 – June 4, 1956) was an American soccer player who was a member of the U.S. soccer team at the 1936 Summer Olympics.

== Early life ==
Guyda was born in 1907 in Manchester, New Hampshire as Andrew Gajda. He attended Manchester High, where he was a football quarterback from 1924 to 1926. He later went to Lowell Institute and Massachusetts Institute of Technology for college.

== Career ==
Guyda was known for being a smaller player in stature. Guyda was signed by the Revere Corinthians in 1926, and later played for other soccer teams such as Boston Soccer Club, Thornton Victorias, Boston Celtics, and Lusitano Recs. Guyda also won the two mile two-state championship in 1929. Guyda was selected to play for the United States men's national soccer team at the 1936 Summer Olympics and played as part of the American League All-Star team in 1934 in Europe. Guyda hurt his knee in 1938, which put him out of action for several months.

== Later life and death ==
Guyda later served as an assistant coach at Harvard, as well as head coach of the freshman team. He died at his home in Waltham, Massachusetts, on June 4, 1956.
