= Sverre Kvammen =

Norwegian footballer (1908-1982)

Personal information
- Date of birth: 6 January 1908
- Place of birth: Bergen, Norway
- Date of death: 4 April 1982 (aged 74)
- Position: Goalkeeper

International career
| Years | Team | Apps | (Gls) |
| 1935 | Norway | 1 | (0) |

Sverre Kvammen (6 January 1908 – 4 April 1982) was a Norwegian footballer. He played in one match for the Norway national football team in 1935. He was also part of Norway's squad for the football tournament at the 1936 Summer Olympics, but he did not play in any matches.
