= Oskar Stamet =

Luxembourgish footballer

Personal information
- Date of birth: 9 September 1913
- Place of birth: Luxembourg, Luxembourg
- Date of death: 21 August 1981 (aged 67)
- Place of death: Homburg, Germany

International career
Years	Team	Apps	(Gls)
- Luxembourg

Oskar Stamet (9 September 1913 – 21 August 1981) was a Luxembourgish footballer. He competed in the men's tournament at the 1936 Summer Olympics.
