= Ali Shafi =

Egyptian footballer (born 1908)

Personal information
- Full name: Ali Hussein Shafi
- Date of birth: 10 April 1908
- Place of birth: Egypt
- Position: Midfielder

Senior career*
Years	Team	Apps	(Gls)
- Zamalek SC

International career
- Egypt
- * Club domestic league appearances and goals

Ali Hussein Shafi (Arabic: عَلِيّ حُسَيْن شَافِي; born 10 April 1908, date of death unknown) was an Egyptian football midfielder who played for Egypt in the 1934 FIFA World Cup. He also played for Zamalek SC, and was part of Egypt's squad at the 1936 Summer Olympics, but he did not play in any matches. Shafi is deceased.
