= Gyula Király (footballer) =

Hungarian footballer

Personal information
- Nationality: Hungarian
- Born: 28 October 1908

Sport
- Sport: Football
- Club: BKV Előre SC

Gyula Király (born 28 October 1908) was a Hungarian international football player. He played for the club BKV Előre SC. He participated with the Hungary national football team at the 1936 Summer Olympics in Berlin.
