= Jean-Pierre Frisch =

Luxembourgish footballer

Personal information
- Date of birth: 7 May 1908
- Place of birth: Esch-sur-Alzette, Luxembourg
- Date of death: 4 August 1995 (aged 87)
- Place of death: Esch-sur-Alzette, Luxembourg

International career
Years	Team	Apps	(Gls)
- Luxembourg

Jean-Pierre Frisch (7 May 1908 – 4 August 1995) was a Luxembourgish footballer. He competed in the men's tournament at the 1936 Summer Olympics.
