= Guy Holmes (footballer) =

English footballer

Personal information
- Full name: Guy Gorham Holmes
- Date of birth: 1 December 1905
- Place of birth: Ilford, England
- Date of death: 22 November 1967 (aged 61)
- Place of death: Hastings, England
- Position: Right back

Senior career*
Years	Team	Apps	(Gls)
- Ilford

International career
1936	Great Britain	2	(0)
- * Club domestic league appearances and goals

Guy Gorham Holmes (1 December 1905 – 22 November 1967) was an English footballer who represented Great Britain at the 1936 Summer Olympics. Holmes played amateur football for Ilford.
