= Chen Zhenhe =

Chinese footballer (1906–1941)

Personal information
- Date of birth: 15 March 1906
- Place of birth: Batavia, Dutch East Indies
- Date of death: 28 January 1941 (aged 34)
- Place of death: Lanzhou, China

International career
Years	Team	Apps	(Gls)
- China

Chen Zhenhe (15 March 1906 – 28 January 1941) was a Chinese footballer. He competed in the men's tournament at the 1936 Summer Olympics.

== Early life ==
Born in Batavia, Java in the then Netherlands East Indies, he was brought to China by his father to be brought up in their ancestral city of Xiamen. He entered the Shanghai Jinan National University in 1926, intending to study business administration.

== Football career ==
He played in his university football team, winning eight championships in nine years. He next played for the Shanghai club You-You. Prior to his selection for the Olympic team he had played in the winning China national football team in the Far Eastern Games in 1930 and 1934 and was playing in the Shanghai You-You F.C.

== Military career and death ==
In 1932 he entered the Chinese Central Aviation School and became commissioned in the Chinese Air Force. He served from 1937 in the Second Sino-Japanese War that became part of World War II. A Squadron Leader, he was killed in action when on the first flight of a new aircraft he crashed near Lanzhou.
