= Teodoro Alcalde =

Peruvian footballer (1913–1995)

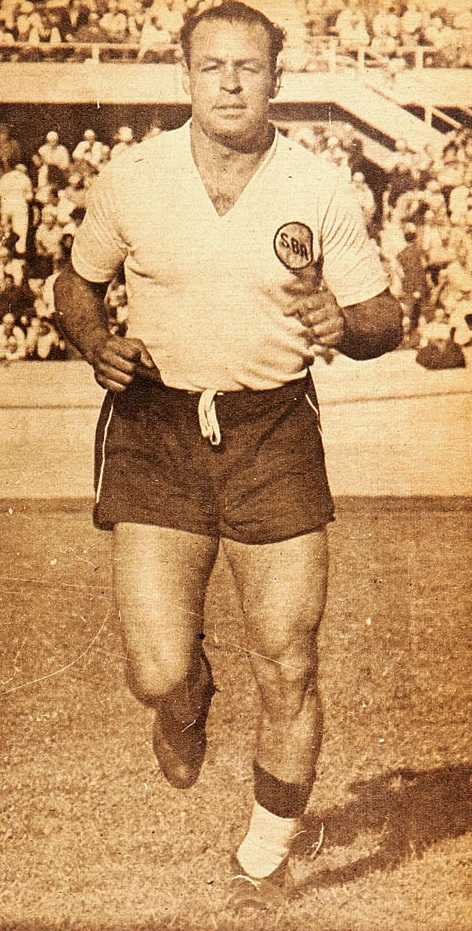

Personal information
- Full name: Teodoro Alcalde Millos
- Date of birth: 20 September 1913
- Place of birth: Callao, Peru
- Date of death: 9 August 1995 (aged 81)

Senior career*
Years	Team	Apps	(Gls)
- Sport Boys

International career
–	Peru		
- * Club domestic league appearances and goals

Teodoro "Prisco" Alcalde Millos (20 September 1913 – 9 August 1995) was a Peruvian international football player. He was born in Callao as the second eldest of 3 brothers, with Victor Alcalde and Jorge "Campolo" Alcalde being the others. He played for the Peru national football team at the 1936 Summer Olympics in Berlin. He played for 7 other professional football teams in his career, which ended in 1951.
