= 1936 Peru v Austria football match =

1936 Summer Olympics Quarterfinals
- Event: 1936 Summer Olympics
| Peru | Austria |
| (Peru) | (Austria) |
| 4 | 2 |
- Date: 8 August 1936
- Venue: Hertha Platz, Berlin
- Referee: Thoralf Kristiansen (Norway)
- Attendance: 5,000

Peru v Austria was a football match played on 8 August 1936 during the Summer Olympics at Hertha Platz in Berlin. The match became notable for causing controversy after it was annulled because of a pitch invasion from Peruvian supporters who had assaulted the Austrian players. Peru had three extra time goals disallowed by the referee and ended up winning the match 4–2.

After the incidents, FIFA ordered the match to be played again without attending. As the Peruvian representatives could not appeal the decision the team withdrew without attending the replay (following an order of president Óscar R. Benavides), Austria were declared winners and advanced to the semifinals.

== Match ==
=== Lead-up ===
In the first stage of the tournament, Peru (whose squad comprised members of Alianza Lima, Universitario de Deportes and 1935 league champions Sport Boys) defeated Finland 7–3 (with Lolo Fernández scoring five goals), while Austria beat Egypt 3–1.

=== Summary ===
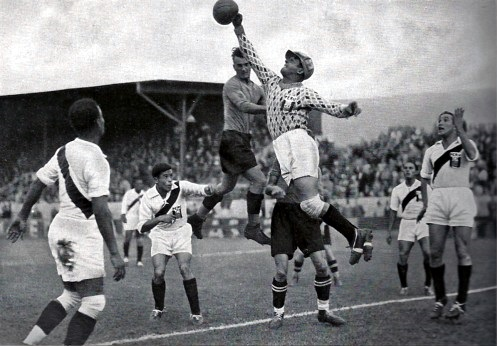
A moment of the match, with goalkeeper Juan Valdivieso leaping in the air to stop an Austrian attack

Walter Werginz opened the scoring for Austria in the 23rd minute, to give the Austrian side a one-goal lead. Shortly after, in the 37th minute of action, Klement Steinmetz put a ball past Peruvian keeper Juan Valdivieso to double Austria's early lead. After 45 minutes of play, the scoreline was 0–2 in favour of the Austrians.

In the 75th minute, Peru scored their first goal through Jorge Alcalde. Six minutes later, in the 81st minute of play, Alejandro Villanueva scored the equalizer. The remaining minutes of the match saw no further scoring, and the match went to extra time.

During extra time, Peru netted the ball five times, but three goals were disallowed by the referee and they went on to win 4–2.

=== Details ===
8 August 1936
17:30

| Peru | 4–2 (a.e.t.) | Austria |
|---|---|---|
| Alcalde 75'; Villanueva 81', 117'; Fernández 119' | Report | Wergin 23'; Steinmetz 37' |

Hertha-BSC Platz, Berlin
Attendance: 5,000
Referee: Thoralf Kristiansen (NOR)

| Peru | Austria |

| GK | Juan Valdivieso |
| DF | Arturo Fernández |
| DF | Víctor Lavalle |
| MF | Carlos Tovar |
| MF | Segundo Castillo |
| MF | Orestes Jordan |
| FW | Adelfo Magallanes |
| FW | Jorge Alcalde | (substituted off) 82' |
| FW | Teodoro Fernández |
| FW | Alejandro Villanueva |
| FW | José Morales |
Substitutes:
| MF | Prisco Alcalde |
| FW | Eulogio García |
Manager:
(Peru) Alberto Denegri

| GK | Eduard Kainberger |
| DF | Ernst Kunz |
| DF | Martin Kargl |
| MF | Anton Krenn |
| MF | Karl Wahlmüller |
| MF | Max Hofmeister |
| FW | Walter Werginz |
| FW | Adolf Laudon |
| FW | Klement Steinmetz |
| FW | Josef Kitzmueller |
| FW | Franz Fuchsberger |
Substitutes:
| MF | Franz Mandl |
| FW | Karl Kainberger |
Manager:
(England) James Hogan

Assistant referees:
(Hungary) Pal von Hertzka
(Finland) Esko Pekonen

== Post-match ==
The Austrians demanded a rematch on the grounds that Peruvian fans had stormed the field, which then did not meet the requirements for a football game. Austria further claimed that the Peruvian players had manhandled the Austrians and that spectators, one holding a revolver, had "swarmed down on the field." Peru was summoned on this issue but were delayed by a Nazi parade. FIFA accepted that the pitch had been invaded and that an Austrian player had been assaulted.

The Peruvian arguments were not heard, the Olympic Committee and FIFA ruled in favour of Austria, ordering a rematch behind closed doors, initially for 10 August, but later rescheduled for 11 August.

As a protest against these actions, which the Peruvians deemed as insulting and discriminatory, the entire Olympic delegations of Peru and Colombia left Germany. Argentina, Chile, Uruguay, and Mexico expressed their solidarity with Peru. Miguel Dasso, a member of the Peruvian Olympic Committee, stated: "We have no faith in European athletics. We have come here and found a bunch of merchants." The game was awarded to Austria by default. When the Peruvian team and delegation came back to Callao, they were warmly welcomed by thousands of people who acclaimed them as the true champions.

In Peru, angry crowds protested against the decisions of the Olympic Committee by tearing down an Olympic flag, throwing stones at the German consulate, refusing to load German vessels in the docks of Callao, and listening to inflammatory speeches which included President Oscar Benavides Larrea's mention of "the crafty Berlin decision." It is speculated that Adolf Hitler and the Nazi authorities might have had some involvement in this situation, though this was not claimed at the time.

Peru was coached by Alberto Denegri, whereas Austria was managed by Englishman James Hogan. Austria won silver in the tournament. Three years later Peru won the 1939 South American Championship.

== Legacy ==
Uruguayan writer Eduardo Galeano referred to the match as "the history of dignity", stating that the Olympic Committee ruled that the match had to be played again alleging that they could not allow a team formed by mestizos defeat an Aryan race squad when Nazism was in full swing.

In 2014, it was announced that a 10-part miniseries (named Goleadores) produced by French Michel Gómez and inspired on the match, would be made. Gómez stated that it "was based on real facts because FIFA was under pressure from the Nazi government to annull the game. The miniseries was starred by Peruvian and Argentine actors and filmed in Lima.

== See also ==
- Football at the 1936 Summer Olympics
