= Italy at the 1936 Summer Olympics =

- IOC code: ITA
- NOC: Italian National Olympic Committee

in Berlin
- Competitors: 244 (228 men and 16 women) in 17 sports
- Flag bearer: Giulio Gaudini
- Medals Ranked 4th: Gold 8 Silver 9 Bronze 5 Total 22

Summer Olympics appearances (overview)
- 1896; 1900; 1904; 1908; 1912; 1920; 1924; 1928; 1932; 1936; 1948; 1952; 1956; 1960; 1964; 1968; 1972; 1976; 1980; 1984; 1988; 1992; 1996; 2000; 2004; 2008; 2012; 2016; 2020; 2024; 2028

Other related appearances
- 1906 Intercalated Games

Italy competed at the 1936 Summer Olympics in Berlin, Germany. 244 competitors, 228 men and 16 women, took part in 99 events in 17 sports.

== Medals ==
=== Gold ===
- Ondina Valla - Track and field, women's 80 m Hurdles
- Ulderico Sergo - Boxing, a series of 53.5 kg
- Giulio Gaudini - Fencing, men's foil
- Franco Riccardi - Fencing – Men's épée
- Giulio Gaudini, Gioacchino Guaragna, Gustavo Marzi, Giorgio Bocchino, Manlio Di Rosa and Ciro Verratti - Fencing, men's foil team competition
- Saverio Ragno, Alfredo Pezzana, Giancarlo Cornaggia-Medici, Edoardo Mangiarotti, Franco Riccardi and Giancarlo Brusati - Fencing, men's kalvan team competition
- Bruno Venturini, Alfredo Foni, Pietro Rava, Giuseppe Baldo, Achille Piccini, Ugo Locatelli, Annibale Frossi, Libero Marchini, Sergio Bertoni, Carlo Biagi, Francesco Gabriotti, Giulio Cappelli, Alfonso Negro and Luigi Scarabello - Football, men
- Giovanni Reggio, Bruno Bianchi, Luigi De Manincor, Domenico Mordini, Luigi Poggi and Enrico Poggi - Sailing, 8MR

=== Silver ===
- Mario Lanzi - Track and field, men's 800 m
- Orazio Mariani, Gianni Caldana, Elio Ragni and Tullio Gonnelli - Track and field, men's 4 × 100 m relay
- Almiro Bergamo, Guido Santin and Luciano Negrini - Rowing, Men pair cox
- Guglielmo Del Bimbo, Dino Barsotti, Oreste Grossi, Enzo Bartolini, Mario Checcacci, Dante Secchi, Ottorino Quaglierini, Enrico Garzelli and Cesare Milani - Rowing, men's eight
- Gavino Matta - Boxing, a series of 50.8 kg
- Severino Rigoni, Bianco Bianchi, Mario Gentili and Armando Latini - Cycling, Men's Team Pursuit
- Saverio Ragno - Fencing, men épée
- Gustavo Marzi - Fencing, men's sabre
- Vincenzo Pinton, Giulio Gaudini, Aldo Masciotta, Gustavo Marzi, Aldo Montano and Athos Tanzini - Fencing, men's sabre team competition

=== Bronze ===
- Luigi Beccali - Track and field, men's 1500 m
- Giorgio Oberweger - Track and field, men's discus throw
- Giorgio Bocchino - Fencing, men's foil
- Giancarlo Cornaggia-Medici - Fencing, men épée
- Silvano Abba - Modern Pentathlon, men's individual competition

== Athletics ==
=== Results ===
Men (27)
Athlete	Age	Event	Rank	Medal
Mario Lanzi	21	Men's 400 metres	4 h1 r3/4	
Mario Lanzi	21	Men's 800 metres	2	Silver
Luigi Beccali	28	Men's 1,500 metres	3	Bronze
Umberto Cerati	25	Men's 5,000 metres	7	
Salvatore Mastroieni	22	Men's 5,000 metres	6 h3 r1/2	
Giuseppe Beviacqua	21	Men's 10,000 metres	11	
Giannino Bulzone	25	Men's Marathon	AC	
Aurelio Genghini	28	Men's Marathon	AC	
Gianni Caldana	22	Men's 110 metres Hurdles	3 h6 r1/3	
Luigi Facelli	38	Men's 400 metres Hurdles	3 h2 r1/3	
Umberto Ridi	22	Men's 400 metres Hurdles	4 h4 r1/3	
Emilio Mori	28	Men's 400 metres Hurdles	6 h3 r1/3	
Bruno Betti	25	Men's 3,000 metres Steeplechase	7 h3 r1/2	
Giuseppe Lippi	32	Men's 3,000 metres Steeplechase	8 h1 r1/2	
Orazio Mariani	21	Men's 4 × 100 metres Relay	2	Silver
Gianni Caldana	22	Men's 4 × 100 metres Relay	2	Silver
Elio Ragni	25	Men's 4 × 100 metres Relay	2	Silver
Tullio Gonnelli	23	Men's 4 × 100 metres Relay	2	Silver
Angelo Ferrario	28	Men's 4 × 100 metres Relay	3 h3 r1/2	
Marsilio Rossi	19	Men's 4 × 100 metres Relay	3 h3 r1/2	
Otello Spampani	18	Men's 4 × 100 metres Relay	3 h3 r1/2	
Mario Lanzi	21	Men's 4 × 100 metres Relay	3 h3 r1/2	
Ettore Rivolta	31	Men's 50 kilometres Walk	12	
Giuseppe Gobbato	32	Men's 50 kilometres Walk	14	
Mario Brignoli	34	Men's 50 kilometres Walk	18	
Danilo Innocenti	32	Men's Pole Vault	6T	
Arturo Maffei	26	Men's Long Jump	4T	
Gianni Caldana	22	Men's Long Jump	12	
Giorgio Oberweger	22	Men's Discus Throw	3	Bronze
Ruggero Biancani	21	Men's Discus Throw	AC QR	
Giovanni Cantagalli	22	Men's Hammer Throw	15	
Women (5)
Athlete	Age	Event	Rank	Medal
Claudia Testoni	20	Women's 100 metres	5 h5 r1/3	
Ondina Valla	20	Women's 80 metres Hurdles	1	Gold
Claudia Testoni	20	Women's 80 metres Hurdles	4	
Lidia Bongiovanni	21	Women's 4 × 100 metres Relay	4	
Ondina Valla	20	Women's 4 × 100 metres Relay	4	
Fernanda Bullano	21	Women's 4 × 100 metres Relay	4	
Claudia Testoni	20	Women's 4 × 100 metres Relay	4	
Gabre Gabric-Calvesi	18	Women's Discus Throw	10	

== Basketball ==
First round

7 August 1936
17:00

Report, p. 1078

Italy 44, Poland 28
Scoring by half: 25–12, 19–16

Tennis Courts, Court 1
Referees: A. Selenoi (Estonia), J. Christensen (Germany), H. Kalshaus (Germany)

Second round

9 August 1936
17:00

Report, p. 1080

Italy 58, Germany 16
Scoring by half: 38–11, 20–5

Tennis Courts, Court 3
Referees: Sohaku Ri (Japan), K. Falk (Germany), H. Kascher (Germany)

Third round

11 August 1936
16:00

Report, p. 1080

Italy 27, Chile 19
Scoring by half: 16–12, 11–7

Tennis Courts, Court 2
Referees: A. Selenoi (Estonia), Ch. Perschon (Germany), W. Balzereit (Germany)

Fourth round

12 August 1936
17:00

Report, p. 1082

Mexico 34, Italy 17
Scoring by half: 20–7, 14–10

Tennis Courts, Court 5
Referees: E. Powers (Canada), F. Becker (Germany), H. Hammes (Germany)

5th–8th place semifinals

13 August 1936
17:00

Report, p. 1082

Philippines 32, Italy 14
Scoring by half: 18–6, 14–8

Tennis Courts, Court 5
Referees: R. Semerciyan (Turkey), H. Emschermann (Germany), H. Hammes (Germany)

7th place game

14 August 1936
16:00

Report, p. 1082

Italy vs. Peru
Match suspended after the entire peruvian delegation forfeited the Games.

=== Men's team competition ===
- Team Roster

- Enrico Cestelli
- Galeazzo Dondi
- Livio Franceschini
- Emilio Giosetti
- Giancarlo Marinelli
- Sergio Paganella
- Egidio Premiani
- Gino Basso

== Canoeing ==
K-1 1000 metres

- Elio Sasso Sant

K-1 10000 metres

- Elio Sasso Sant

== Cycling ==
Eleven cyclists, all men, represented Italy in 1936.

Individual road race

- Pierino Favalli
- Glauco Servadei
- Corrado Ardizzoni
- Elio Bavutti

Team road race

- Pierino Favalli
- Glauco Servadei
- Corrado Ardizzoni
- Elio Bavutti

Sprint

- Benedetto Pola

Time trial

- Benedetto Pola

Tandem

- Carlo Legutti
- Bruno Loatti

Team pursuit

- Bianco Bianchi
- Mario Gentili
- Armando Latini
- Severino Rigoni

== Diving ==
Men

Athlete	Event	Final	
Athlete	Event	Points	Rank
Carlo Dibiasi	10 m platform	90.66	10
Franco Ferraris	10 m platform	77.60	22
Ferrero Marianetti	10 m platform	82.78	17

== Fencing ==
16 fencers, all men, represented Italy in 1936.

Men's foil

- Giulio Gaudini
- Giorgio Bocchino
- Gioacchino Guaragna

Men's team foil

- Manlio Di Rosa, Giulio Gaudini, Gioacchino Guaragna, Gustavo Marzi, Giorgio Bocchino, Ciro Verratti

Men's épée

- Franco Riccardi
- Saverio Ragno
- Giancarlo Cornaggia-Medici

Men's team épée

- Edoardo Mangiarotti, Giancarlo Cornaggia-Medici, Saverio Ragno, Franco Riccardi, Giancarlo Brusati, Alfredo Pezzana

Men's sabre

- Gustavo Marzi
- Vincenzo Pinton
- Giulio Gaudini

Men's team sabre

- Giulio Gaudini, Gustavo Marzi, Aldo Masciotta, Vincenzo Pinton, Aldo Montano, Athos Tanzini

== Football ==
3 August 1936 Round of 16	Italy	1–0	United States	Berlin
17:30	Frossi 58'	Report		Stadium: Poststadion; Attendance: 9,000; Referee: Karl Weingartner (Germany)

7 August 1936 Quarter-finals	Italy	8–0	Japan	Berlin
17:30	Frossi 14', 75', 80'; Biagi 32', 57', 81', 82'; Cappelli 89'	Report		Stadium: Mommsenstadion; Attendance: 8,000; Referee: Otto Olsson (Sweden)

10 August 1936 Semi-finals	Italy	2–1 (a.e.t.)	Norway	Berlin
17:00	Negro 15'; Frossi 96'	Report	Brustad 58'	Stadium: Olympiastadion; Attendance: 95,000; Referee: Pal von Hertzka (Hungary)

15 August 1936 Gold medal match	Italy	2–1 (a.e.t.)	Austria	Berlin
16:00	Frossi 70', 92'	Report	Kainberger 79'	Stadium: Olympiastadion; Attendance: 85,000; Referee: Peco Bauwens (Germany)

=== Men's Team Squad ===
- Bruno Venturini
- Gianni Ferrero
- Alfredo Foni
- Pietro Rava
- Giuseppe Baldo
- Achille Piccini
- Ugo Locatelli
- Annibale Frossi
- Libero Marchini
- Luigi Scarabello
- Carlo Biagi
- Giulio Cappelli
- Sergio Bertoni
- Alfonso Negro
- Francesco Gabriotti
- Adolfo Giuntoli
- Mario Nicolini
- Carlo Girometta
- Sandro Puppo
- Corrado Tamietti
- Paolo Vannucci
- Lamberto Petri

== Gymnastics ==
16 gymnasts, 8 men and 8 women, represented Italy in 1936.

Men's team

- Egidio Armelloni
- Oreste Capuzzo
- Danilo Fioravanti
- Savino Guglielmetti
- Romeo Neri
- Otello Ternelli
- Franco Tognini
- Nicolò Tronci

Women's team

- Anna Avanzini
- Vittoria Avanzini
- Clara Bimbocci
- Ebore Canella
- Pina Cipriotto
- Elda Cividino
- Gianna Guaita
- Carmela Toso

== Modern pentathlon ==
Three male pentathlete represented Italy in 1936.

- Silvano Abbà
- Ugo Ceccarelli
- Franco Orgera

== Rowing ==
Italy had 22 rowers participate in five out of seven rowing events in 1936.

Men's single sculls

- Riccardo Steinleitner

Men's coxed pair

- Almiro Bergamo
- Guido Santin
- Luciano Negrini (cox)

Men's coxless four

- Antonio Ghiardello
- Luigi Luxardo
- Aldo Pellizzoni
- Francesco Pittaluga

Men's coxed four

- Valerio Perentin
- Giliante D'Este
- Nicolò Vittori
- Umberto Vittori
- Renato Petronio (cox)

Men's eight

- Guglielmo Del Bimbo
- Dino Barsotti
- Oreste Grossi
- Enzo Bartolini
- Mario Checcacci
- Dante Secchi
- Ottorino Quaglierini
- Enrico Garzelli
- Cesare Milani (cox)

== Shooting ==
Nine shooters represented Italy in 1936.

25 m rapid fire pistol

- Walter Boninsegni
- Bruno Giacconi
- Michelangelo Borriello

50 m pistol

- Stefano Margotti
- Giancarlo Boriani
- Ugo Pistolesi

50 m rifle, prone

- Mario Zorzi
- Carlo Varetto
- Lodovico Nulli
