= Rowing at the 1936 Summer Olympics – Men's coxed pair =

Men's coxed pairs at the Games of the XI Olympiad
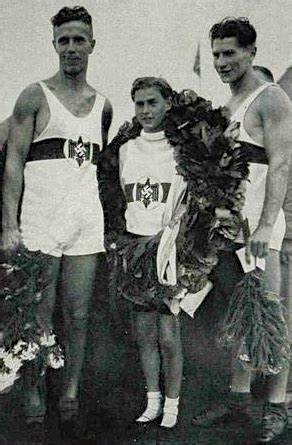
- Gold medal team Gerhard Gustmann, Herbert Adamski, and Dieter Arend
- Venue: Grünau, Langer See
- Dates: 12–14 August 1936
- Competitors: 36 from 12 nations

Medalists
1st place, gold medalist(s)		Gerhard Gustmann; Herbert Adamski; Dieter Arend (cox); Germany
2nd place, silver medalist(s)		Almiro Bergamo; Guido Santin; Luciano Negrini (cox); Italy
3rd place, bronze medalist(s)		Marceau Fourcade; Georges Tapie; Noël Vandernotte (cox); France

The men's coxed pair competition at the 1936 Summer Olympics in Berlin took place at Grünau on the Langer See. It was held from 12 to 14 August. There were 12 boats (36 competitors) from 12 nations, with each nation limited to a single boat in the event. It was twice the highest number of boats that had previously competed in an Olympic tournament (6 boats in 1928). The event was won by the German team, rowers Gerhard Gustmann and Herbert Adamski and coxswain Dieter Arend, in the nation's debut in the event. Italy earned its first medal in the event since 1924 with silver by Almiro Bergamo, Guido Santin, and cox Luciano Negrini. France extended its podium streak to three Games with bronze by Marceau Fourcade, Georges Tapie, and cox Noël Vandernotte.

== Background ==
This was the sixth appearance of the event. Rowing had been on the programme in 1896 but was cancelled due to bad weather. The men's coxed pair was one of the original four events in 1900, but was not held in 1904, 1908, or 1912. It returned to the programme after World War I and was held every Games from 1924 to 1992, when it (along with the men's coxed four) was replaced with the men's lightweight double sculls and men's lightweight coxless four.

Five of the 12 competitors from the 1932 coxed pair event returned: Poland's silver medal team, Jerzy Braun, Janusz Ślązak, and cox Jerzy Skolimowski; and two members of Brazil's fourth-place boat, José Ramalho and cox Estevam Strata.

Denmark, Germany, Hungary, Japan, and Yugoslavia each made their debut in the event. France made its sixth appearance, the only nation to have competed in all editions of the event to that point. Belgium was the only nation to have competed previously but not in 1936.

== Competition format ==
The coxed pair event featured three-person boats, with two rowers and a coxswain. It was a sweep rowing event, with the rowers each having one oar (and thus each rowing on one side). The tournament featured three rounds: semifinals, a repechage, and a final. The course used the 2000 metres distance that became the Olympic standard in 1912. The competition introduced the 6-boat heat.

- Semifinals: There were 2 semifinals, each with 6 boats. The winner of each heat advanced directly to the final; the remaining boats competed in the repechage.
- Repechage: There were 2 repechage heats, each with 5 boats (before a withdrawal). The top two boats in each heat advanced to the final, with the rest of the boats eliminated.
- Final: A single final, with 6 boats.

== Schedule ==
Date	Time	Round
Wednesday, 12 August 1936	15:00	Semifinals
Thursday, 13 August 1936	16:00	Repechage
Friday, 14 August 1936	16:00	Final

== Results ==
=== Semifinals ===
The first boat of each heat qualified for the final; the remainder went to the repechage.

==== Semifinal 1 ====
Rank	Rowers	Coxswain	Nation	Time	Notes
1	Gerhard Gustmann; Herbert Adamski	Dieter Arend	Germany	7:27.3	Q
2	Almiro Bergamo; Guido Santin	Luciano Negrini	Italy	7:33.6	R
3	Károly Győry; Tibor Mamusich	László Molnár	Hungary	7:36.5	R
4	Jerzy Braun; Janusz Ślązak	Jerzy Skolimowski	Poland	7:53.9	R
5	Tom Curran; Joe Dougherty	George Loveless	United States	7:55.6	R
6	Estevam Strata; José Ramalho	Decio Klettenberg	Brazil	8:13.7	R

==== Semifinal 2 ====
Rank	Rowers	Coxswain	Nation	Time	Notes
1	Marceau Fourcade; Georges Tapie	Noël Vandernotte	France	7:38.4	Q
2	Remond Larsen; Carl Berner	Aage Jensen	Denmark	7:41.1	R
3	Georges Gschwind; Hans Appenzeller	Rolf Spring	Switzerland	7:48.7	R
4	Ivo Fabris; Elko Mrduljaš	Pavao Ljubičić	Yugoslavia	7:53.3	R
5	Tsutomu Mitsudome; Osamu Abe	Taro Teshima	Japan	7:53.4	R
6	Karel Hardeman; Ernst de Jonge	Hans van Walsem	Netherlands	7:56.9	R

=== Repechage ===
The first two in each heat qualified for the final.

==== Repechage heat 1 ====
Rank	Rowers	Coxswain	Nation	Time	Notes
1	Remond Larsen; Carl Berner	Aage Jensen	Denmark	8:51.1	Q
2	Georges Gschwind; Hans Appenzeller	Rolf Spring	Switzerland	8:58.9	Q
3	Karel Hardeman; Ernst de Jonge	Hans van Walsem	Netherlands	9:03.1	
4	Tom Curran; Joe Dougherty	George Loveless	United States	9:13.6	
5	Estevam Strata; José Ramalho	Decio Klettenberg	Brazil	9:32.3	

==== Repechage heat 2 ====
Rank	Rowers	Coxswain	Nation	Time	Notes
1	Almiro Bergamo; Guido Santin	Luciano Negrini	Italy	8:50.0	Q
2	Ivo Fabris; Elko Mrduljaš	Pavao Ljubičić	Yugoslavia	8:53.8	Q
3	Jerzy Braun; Janusz Ślązak	Jerzy Skolimowski	Poland	8:56.2	
4	Tsutomu Mitsudome; Osamu Abe	Taro Teshima	Japan	9:06.3	
—	Károly Győry; Tibor Mamusich	László Molnár	Hungary	DNS	

=== Final ===
Rank	Rowers	Coxswain	Nation	Time
1st place, gold medalist(s)	Gerhard Gustmann; Herbert Adamski	Dieter Arend	Germany	8:36.9
2nd place, silver medalist(s)	Almiro Bergamo; Guido Santin	Luciano Negrini	Italy	8:49.7
3rd place, bronze medalist(s)	Marceau Fourcade; Georges Tapie	Noël Vandernotte	France	8:54.0
4	Remond Larsen; Carl Berner	Aage Jensen	Denmark	8:55.8
5	Georges Gschwind; Hans Appenzeller	Rolf Spring	Switzerland	9:10.9
6	Ivo Fabris; Elko Mrduljaš	Pavao Ljubičić	Yugoslavia	9:19.4

== Results summary ==
Rank	Rowers	Coxswain	Nation	Semifinals	Repechage	Final
1st place, gold medalist(s)	Gerhard Gustmann; Herbert Adamski	Dieter Arend	Germany	7:27.3	Bye	8:36.9
2nd place, silver medalist(s)	Almiro Bergamo; Guido Santin	Luciano Negrini	Italy	7:33.6	8:50.0	8:49.7
3rd place, bronze medalist(s)	Marceau Fourcade; Georges Tapie	Noël Vandernotte	France	7:38.4	Bye	8:54.0
4	Remond Larsen; Carl Berner	Aage Jensen	Denmark	7:41.1	8:51.1	8:55.8
5	Georges Gschwind; Hans Appenzeller	Rolf Spring	Switzerland	7:48.7	8:58.9	9:10.9
6	Ivo Fabris; Elko Mrduljaš	Pavao Ljubičić	Yugoslavia	7:53.3	8:53.8	9:19.4
7	Jerzy Braun; Janusz Ślązak	Jerzy Skolimowski	Poland	7:53.9	8:56.2	Did not advance
8	Karel Hardeman; Ernst de Jonge	Hans van Walsem	Netherlands	7:56.9	9:03.1	Did not advance
9	Tsutomu Mitsudome; Osamu Abe	Taro Teshima	Japan	7:53.4	9:06.3	Did not advance
10	Tom Curran; Joe Dougherty	George Loveless	United States	7:55.6	9:13.6	Did not advance
11	Estevam Strata; José Ramalho	Decio Klettenberg	Brazil	8:13.7	9:32.3	Did not advance
12	Károly Győry; Tibor Mamusich	László Molnár	Hungary	7:36.5	DNS	Did not advance
