= Stadio dei Marmi (Carrara) =

Football stadium

- Stadio Comunale dei Marmi L. Marchini, A. Piccini, P. Vannucci, B. Venturini / Stadio dei Quattro Olimpionici Azzurri
- Carrarese - Mantova - Matchday 1 , Serie B 2026/2027
- Interactive map of Stadio dei Marmi
- Location: Carrara, Italy
- Coordinates: 44°03′55.18″N 10°04′36.5″E
- Owner: Municipality of Carrara
- Capacity: 4,194
- Surface: Grass; 105 m × 68 m (344 ft × 223 ft)

Construction
- Opened: 1955
- Renovated: 2013, 2024

Tenant
- Carrarese

Stadio dei Marmi ("Stadium of the Marbles") is a multi-use stadium in Carrara, Tuscany, Italy. It is currently used mostly for football matches and is the home ground of Carrarese. The stadium holds around 4,194.

== History ==
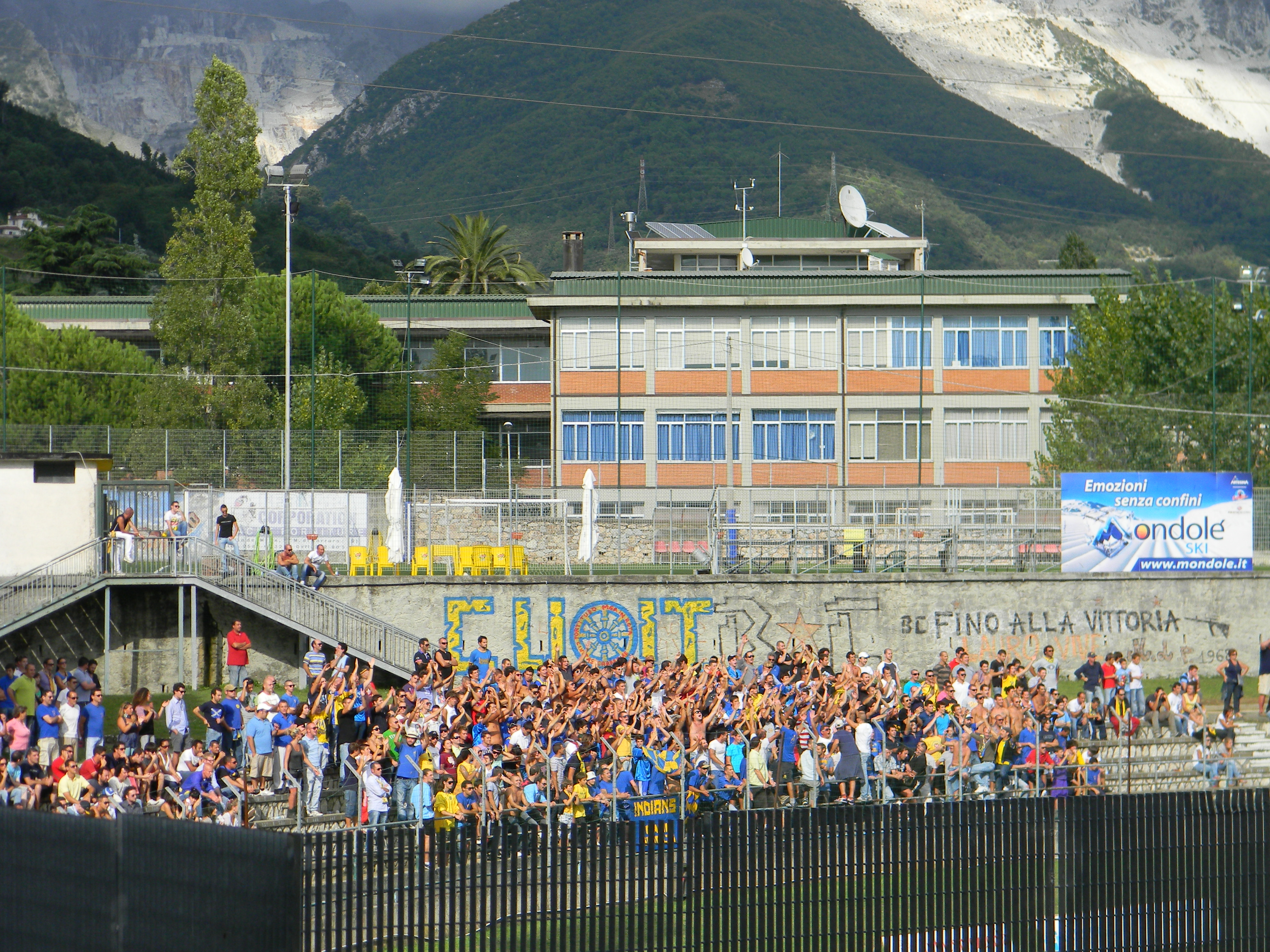
Carrarese supporters inside the stadium

The stadium was named after the marble quarries that have made Carrara famous worldwide, also thanks to their use by illustrious sculptors such as Michelangelo Buonarroti.

Since 2007, the stadium has also been named in honor of four athletes from Carrara who participated in the 1936 Olympics: Libero Marchini, Achille Piccini, Paolo Vannucci, and Bruno Venturini. The official name is therefore Stadio Comunale dei Marmi L. Marchini, A. Piccini, P. Vannucci, B. Venturini (olimpionici 1936), which can also be abbreviated to Stadio dei Quattro Olimpionici Azzurri ("Stadium of the Four Sky Blue Olympians"). However, the name Stadio dei Marmi remains the most commonly used to refer to the venue.

The stadium's capacity was boosted to around 5,500 for the 2024–25 season, in order to enable Carrarese to play the Serie B matches in their home town. During the renovations to upgrade the stadium, the team played at the Arena Garibaldi-Romeo Anconetani in Pisa during their home games. They returned to their home stadium on October 20, 2024.
