= Salzburger AK 1914 =

SAK 1914
- Full name: Salzburger Athletiksport-Klub 1914
- Founded: 24 June 1914; 112 years ago
- Ground: Sportzentrum Mitte, Salzburg
- Capacity: 2,500
- Chairman: Josef Penco
- Manager: Roman Wallner
- League: Regionalliga Salzburg
- 2021–22: 10th (Regionalliga Salzburg)
- Website: http://www.sak1914.at/
Home colours	Away colours

Salzburger AK 1914 is a football club based in the city of Salzburg, Austria who currently plays in the 3rd tier Regionalliga Salzburg. It was founded in 1914 and is the oldest football club from that city.

== History ==
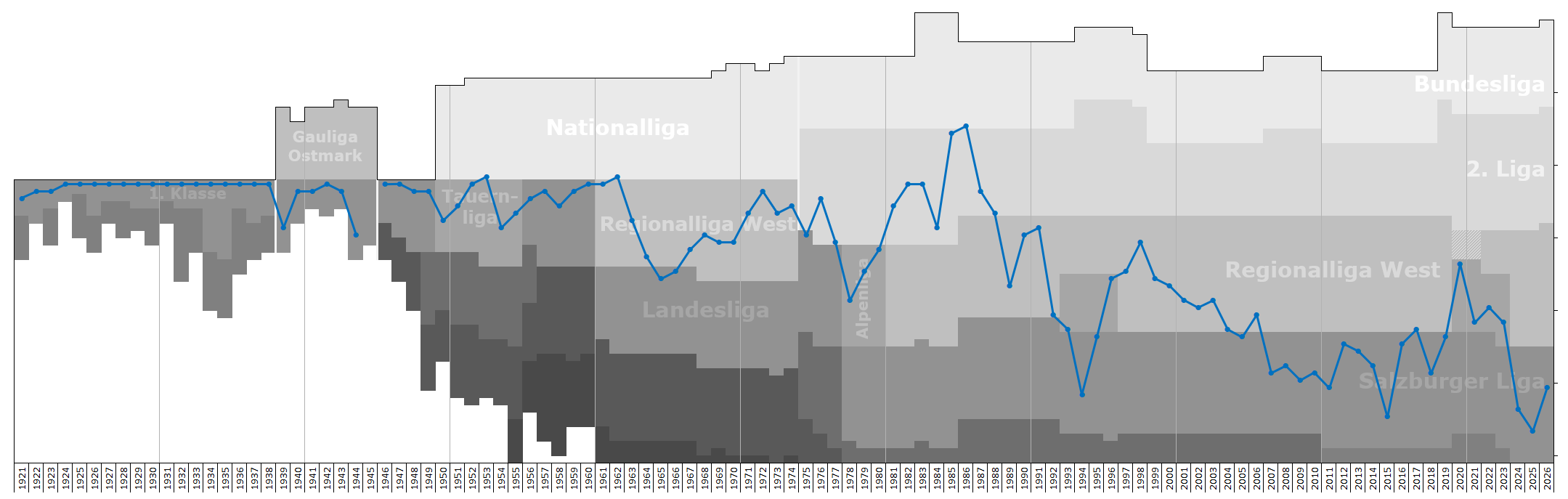
Historical chart of SAK league performance

The club was formed by pupils from a nearby school. In 1914 the club was officially formed and played their first match against FC Traunstein. The first match was lost by 1:4. Nevertheless, before the Second World War the SAK 1914 was the most successful football club in Salzburg. 1934, 1935 and 1937 they reached the final of the Austrian amateur championship. Eduard Kainberger, Karl Kainberger, Ernst Bacher and Adolf Laudon, the players of SAK, were part of the 1936 Olympic squad, where runners-up Austria won the silver medal. In all they reached 30 Championships in Salzburg.

After the war other clubs like SV Austria Salzburg or SK Bischofshofen were more successful but the SAK was the first team from Salzburg which reached the highest class (1952-Staatsliga A). Also in the 1961/62 and 1980/81 season they played in the highest division. All together the SAK played nine seasons in the professional leagues. But 1988 they were relegated from the 2.Division and playing ever since that time in amateur leagues.

The 2007/08 season was the last in their venue, the SAK Sportanlage Nonntal. It was renovated and was now called Sportzentrum Mitte. SAK ground-share with UFC Salzburg at this pitch.

== Notable players ==
- Eduard Kainberger – won the silver medal with the Austrian team at the 1936 Olympic games in Berlin. He played all 4 matches as goalkeeper and was the teamcaptain.
- Karl Kainberger – won the silver medal with the Austrian team at the 1936 Olympic games in Berlin. He played 2 matches and scored two goals.
- Adolf Laudon – won the silver medal with the Austrian team at the 1936 Olympic games in Berlin. He played all 4 matches and scored two goals.
