= Kainberger =

Kainberger is a surname. Notable people with the surname include:

- Eduard Kainberger (1911–1974), Austrian footballer
- Karl Kainberger (1912–1997), Austrian footballer
