= Joe Dougherty (rower) =

American rower (1901–1981)

Personal information
- Born: Joseph Michael Dougherty; 3 July 1901 Philadelphia, the United States
- Died: 8 February 1981 (aged 79) Upper Darby, United States
- Height: 190 cm (6 ft 3 in)
- Weight: 84 kg (185 lb)

Sport
- Sport: Rowing
- Club: Penn AC, Philadelphia
Medal record
Men's rowing
Representing the United States
European Rowing Championships
Gold medal – first place	1930 Liège	Eight

Joseph Michael Dougherty (3 July 1901 – 8 February 1981) was an American rower. He competed at the 1928 Summer Olympics in Amsterdam with the men's coxed pair with Augustus Goetz and Thomas Mack as coxswain where they were eliminated in the round one repechage. At the 1936 Summer Olympics in Berlin, he again competed in the coxed pair, this time with Tom Curran and George Loveless as coxswain.
