= Football at the 1936 Summer Olympics =

1936 Men's Olympic Football Tournament
Tournament details
- Host country: Germany
- City: Berlin
- Dates: 3–15 August
- Teams: 16 (from 4 confederations)
- Venues: 4 (in 1 host city)

Final positions
- Champions: Italy (1st title)
- Runners-up: Austria
- Third place: Norway
- Fourth place: Poland

Tournament statistics
- Matches played: 16
- Goals scored: 78 (4.88 per match)
- Attendance: 507,469 (31,717 per match)
- Top scorer: Annibale Frossi (7 goals)

The 1936 Summer Olympic Games, hosted by Germany, were the first to feature a football tournament since the creation of the World Cup by FIFA in 1930. Football was not featured in the 1932 Olympics due to a dispute between FIFA and the International Olympic Committee regarding whether participation should be restricted to professional or amateur players. The International Olympic Committee felt that only amateur players should be allowed to compete, while FIFA argued that professional athletes should be included. Without FIFA's involvement, the tournament returned to amateur players only. Additionally, FIFA expressed concern that if a football tournament were included in the Olympic Games, it would downplay the importance of their newly created World Cup. The tournament was structured as a standard single-elimination bracket and featured sixteen participating countries. The competitors included Austria, China, Egypt, Finland, Germany, Great Britain, Hungary, Italy, Japan, Luxembourg, Norway, Peru, Poland, Sweden, Turkey, and the United States.

== Controversies ==
Despite the tensions caused by the fact that the Hitler Regime was sponsoring the Berlin Olympics, many teams still chose to go. It was decided that it would be purely a sporting event, with no politics involved. However, the Dutch Football Federation (KNVB), did decide to stay home in 1936. This was not because of any political controversies, but rather due to the fact that the International Olympic Committee’s rules were too nonprofessional, compared to what they were used to. France also decided not to send a football team to the Berlin Olympics, due to the disputes of allowing professional players in the Olympic Football Games.

Other countries debated on whether or not to boycott the 1936 Olympics. Avery Brundage, president of United States Olympic Committee at that time, had urged the United States to participate in the games, despite many questioning the morality of attending games hosted by the Nazi Regime. In the end, Brundage would argue that due to promises of non-discrimination from the hosts, that America and other countries should go.

== Venues ==
Berlin	Football at the 1936 Summer Olympics is located in Berlin	Berlin
Olympic Stadium	Football at the 1936 Summer Olympics is located in Berlin	Gesundbrunnen Stadium
Capacity: 100,000	Football at the 1936 Summer Olympics is located in Berlin	Capacity: 35,239
Berlin	Football at the 1936 Summer Olympics is located in Berlin	Berlin
Post Stadium	Football at the 1936 Summer Olympics is located in Berlin	Mommsen Stadium
Capacity: 45,000	Football at the 1936 Summer Olympics is located in Berlin	Capacity: 15,005

== Medalists ==
Gold	Silver	Bronze
Italy Bruno Venturini; Alfredo Foni; Pietro Rava; Giuseppe Baldo; Achille Piccini; Ugo Locatelli; Annibale Frossi; Libero Marchini; Luigi Scarabello; Carlo Biagi; Giulio Cappelli; Sergio Bertoni; Alfonso Negro; Francesco Gabriotti	Austria Franz Fuchsberger; Max Hofmeister; Eduard Kainberger; Karl Kainberger; Martin Kargl; Josef Kitzmüller; Anton Krenn; Ernst Künz; Adolf Laudon; Franz Mandl; Klement Steinmetz; Karl Wahlmüller; Walter Werginz	Norway Henry Johansen; Fredrik Horn; Nils Eriksen; Frithjof Ulleberg; Jørgen Juve; Rolf Holmberg; Sverre Hansen; Magnar Isaksen; Alf Martinsen; Reidar Kvammen; Arne Brustad; Øivind Holmsen; Odd Frantzen; Magdalon Monsen

== First round ==
Peruvian goalkeeper Juan Valdivieso reaches out for the football during match between Austria and Peru

The Italians, who had emerged victorious over the Austrians at the 1934 World Cup now found the Olympic tournament to be a completely different landscape, as it featured several differences in structure and rules compared to the World Cup. Italy's national team, The Azzurri included players such as Alfredo Foni, Pietro Rava and Ugo Locatelli, who would all play in their World Cup victory in Paris two years later. Italy's progression through the first round was partly due to two incidents: the first when their bespectacled forward Frossi scored, the second when Weingartner, the German referee, was literally restrained from sending off Archille Piccini after fouling two Americans. Italian players held both his arms and covered his mouth in protest of the ejection. Ultimately, Piccini stayed on the pitch, and Italy won. The same day, Norway eliminated Turkey 4–0. This was something more than Sweden managed in their tie with Japan the next day in Berlin. With a score of 2–0 in the first 45 minutes, their loss was recorded by the Swedish commentator, Sven Jerring, calling "Japanese, Japanese, Japanese, Japanese all over" (Japaner, japaner, japaner, överallt japaner) during the final minutes as the Japanese defenders held out to emerge as the winners 3–2 with one incident of Takeshi Kamo leaving the match with an injury. This marked the first time an Asian team had participated in either the World Cup or Olympic Games football competition, and the first time an Asian team emerged victorious. The same day, Germany beat Luxembourg by a large margin of 9–0. The following day, on August 5th, Poland defeated Hungary 3–0, and Egypt was eliminated by Austria 3–1. On August 6th, Peru won against Finland with a score of 7–3, and China lost to Great Britain 2–0.

3 August 1936

Italy	1–0	United States
Frossi 58'	Report

Berlin Poststadion
Attendance: 9,000
Referee: Carl Weingartner (GER)

3 August 1936

Norway	4–0	Turkey
Martinsen 30', 70'; Brustad 53'; Kvammen 80'	Report

Berlin Mommsenstadion
Attendance: 8,000
Referee: Giuseppe Scarpi (ITA)

4 August 1936

Japan	3–2	Sweden
Kawamoto 49'; Ukon 62'; Matsunaga 85'	Report	Persson 24', 37'

Berlin Hertha-BSC-Platz
Attendance: 5,000
Referee: Wilhelm Peters (GER)

4 August 1936

Germany	9–0	Luxembourg
Urban 16', 54', 75'; Simetsreiter 32', 48', 74'; Gauchel 49', 89'; Elbern 76'	Report

Berlin Poststadion
Attendance: 12,000
Referee: Pál von Hertzka (HUN)

5 August 1936

Poland	3–0	Hungary
Gad 12', 27'; Wodarz 88'	Report

Berlin Poststadion
Attendance: 5,000
Referee: Raffaele Scorzoni (ITA)

5 August 1936

Austria	3–1	Egypt
Steinmetz 4', 65'; Laudon 7'	Report	Sakr 85'

Berlin Mommsenstadion
Attendance: 6,000
Referee: Arthur James Jewell (GBR)

6 August 1936

Peru	7–3	Finland
Fernández 17', 33', 47', 49', 70'; Villanueva 21', 67'	Report	Kanerva 42' (pen.); Grönlund 75'; Larvo 80'

Berlin Hertha-BSC-Platz
Attendance: 2,500
Referee: Rinaldo Barlassina (ITA)

6 August 1936

Great Britain	2–0	China
Dodds 55'; Finch 65'	Report

Mommsenstadion, Berlin
Attendance: 8,000
Referee: Helmut Fink (GER)

== Quarter-finals ==
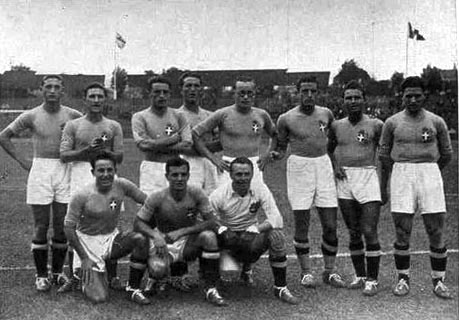
The Italian squad that won the Gold Medal

Italy defeated Japan after Pozzo's decision to include Biagi, who scored goals. The same day at the Poststadion, Berlin before a crowd that included Goebbels, Göring, Hess and Hitler, Germany were knocked out 2–0 by Norway. Goebbels wrote: "The Führer is very excited, I also can barely contain myself. A real bath of nerves." Norway went on to draw with Italy in the first round of the 1938 FIFA World Cup. Germany lost 2–0 and Hitler, who had never seen a football match before, and had originally planned to watch the rowing, left early in a huff.

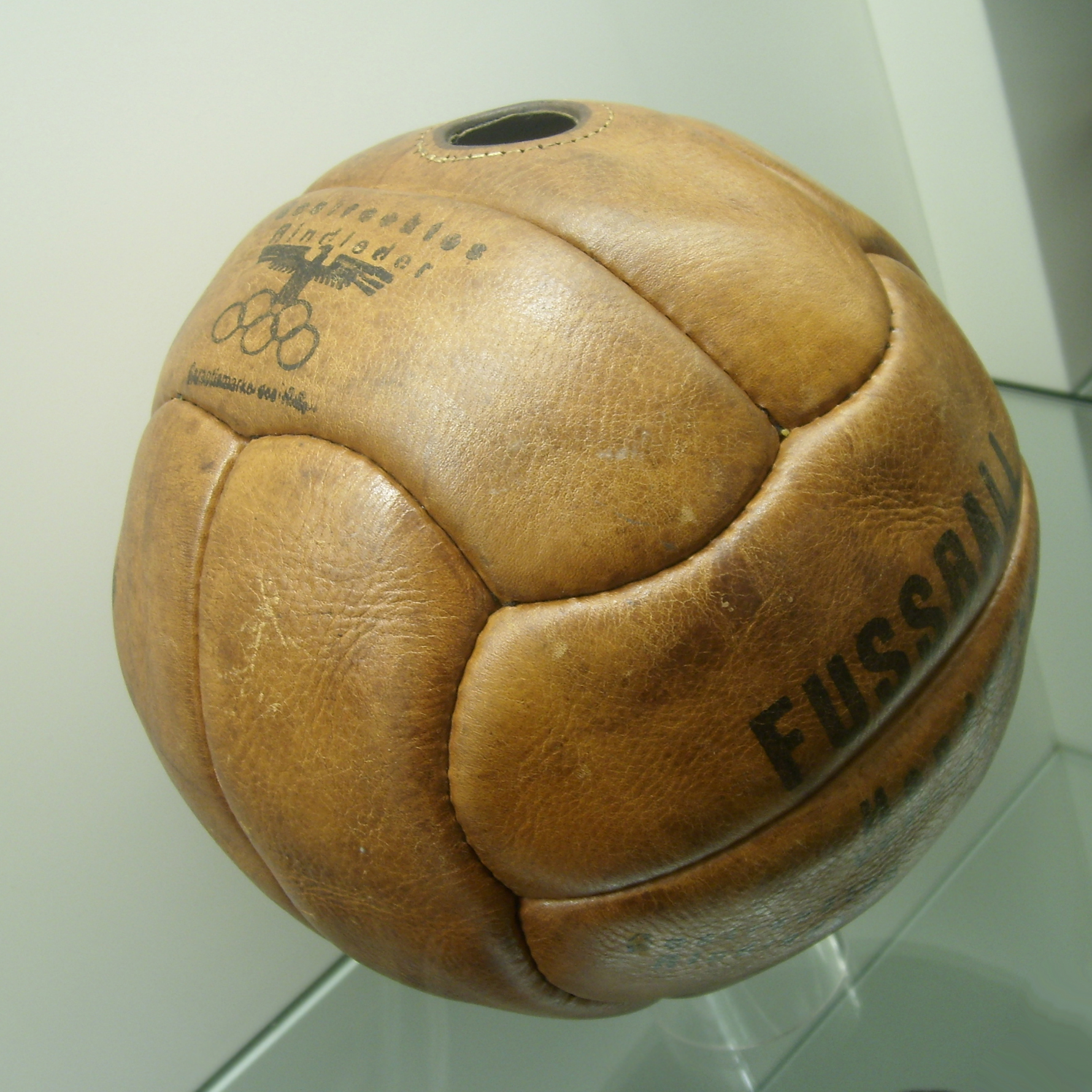
A ball of the competitions is on display at the German Leather Museum

The following day at the Hertha Platz, Austria played Peru. The match was highly contested, and the game went into overtime when the Peruvians drew with the Austrians after being two goals behind. Peru 'scored' five goals during extra time, of which three were disallowed by the referee, and won 4–2. The Austrians demanded a rematch on the grounds that Peruvian fans had stormed the field, and because the field did not meet the requirements for a football game. Austria further claimed that the Peruvian players had manhandled the Austrian players and that spectators, one holding a revolver, had "swarmed down on the field." Peru was notified of this situation, and they attempted to go to the assigned meeting but were delayed by a German parade. In the end, the Peruvian defense was never heard, and the Olympic Committee and FIFA sided with the Austrians. The rematch was scheduled to be replayed behind closed doors on 10 August, and later rescheduled to be taken on 11 August.

As a sign of protest against these actions, which the Peruvians deemed as insulting and discriminatory, the complete Olympic delegations of Peru and Colombia left Germany. Argentina, Chile, Uruguay, and Mexico expressed their solidarity with Peru. Michael Dasso, a member of the Peruvian Olympic Committee, stated: "We've no faith in European athletics. We have come here and found a bunch of merchants." The game was awarded to Austria by default. In Peru, angry crowds protested against the decisions of the Olympic Committee by tearing down an Olympic flag, throwing stones at the German consulate, refusing to load German vessels in the docks of Callao, and listening to inflammatory speeches, which included President Oscar Benavides Larrea's mention of "the crafty Berlin decision." To this day, it is not known with certainty what exactly happened in Germany, but it is popularly believed that Adolf Hitler and the Nazi authorities might have had some involvement in this situation.

In the last of the quarter-finals Poland, assisted by their forward, Hubert Gad, played out a nine-goal party to defeat the British side; at one time they were 5–1 to the better. The Casual's Bernard Joy scored two as Britain fought back gamely but they ran out of time. Prior to the Games Daniel Pettit received a letter from the Football Association which dealt mostly with the uniform he would wear. As he explained to the academic Rachel Cutler there was a handwritten PS that said: 'As there is a month to go before we leave for Berlin kindly take some exercise.' Pettit ran around his local park.

7 August 1936

Italy	8–0	Japan
Frossi 14', 75', 80'; Biagi 32', 57', 81', 82'; Cappelli 89'	Report

Berlin Mommsenstadion
Attendance: 8,000
Referee: Otto Ohlsson (SWE)

7 August 1936

Germany	0–2	Norway
	Report	Isaksen 7', 83'

Berlin Poststadion
Attendance: 55,000
Referee: Arthur Willoughby Barton (GBR)

8 August 1936

Poland	5–4	Great Britain
Gad 33'; Wodarz 43', 48', 53'; Piec 56'	Report	Clements 26'; Shearer 71'; Joy 78', 80'

Berlin Poststadion
Attendance: 6,000
Referee: Rudolf Eklow (SWE)

8 August 1936

Peru	4–2 (a.e.t.)	Austria
Alcalde 75'; Villanueva 81', 117'; Fernández 119'	Report	Werginz 23'; Steinmetz 37'

Berlin Hertha-BSC Platz
Attendance: 5,000
Referee: Thoralf Kristiansen (NOR)

Walkover for Austria.

== Semi-finals ==
The 1936 finals began on August 10th, 1936, with about 95,000 people in attendance. An Austrian report gave the attendance as 90,000. Alfonso Negro scored the initial first goal for Italy, while Norway tied the game with a goal by Brustad (Number 57). Italy takes the win in their match against Norway, with Frossi (Number 15) credited on official reports for the final goal. The next semi-finals match, Austria vs Poland, ended 3–1, with Austria winning the match. Austria scored three goals, firstly by K. Kainberger (Number 17), Werginz (Number 54), and Mandl (Number 88), scoring the winning goal. Other reports credit the last goal to Laudon. Poland scored with 1 goal by Brustad (Number 57).

10 August 1936

Norway	1–2 (a.e.t.)	Italy
Brustad 58'	Report	Negro 15'; Frossi 96'

Berlin Olympic Stadium (Berlin)
Attendance: 95,000
Referee: Pál von Hertzka (HUN)

11 August 1936

Austria	3–1	Poland
Kainberger 14'; Laudon 55'; Mandl 88'	Report	Gad 73'

Berlin Olympic Stadium (Berlin)
Attendance: 82,000
Referee: Arthur Willoughby Barton (GBR)

== Bronze medal match ==
13 August 1936

Norway	3–2	Poland
Brustad 15', 21', 84'	Report	Wodarz 5'; Peterek 24' (pen.)

Berlin Olympic Stadium (Berlin)
Attendance: 95,000
Referee: Alfred Birlem (GER)

== Final (gold medal match) ==
In the final, Italy overcame Austria in a match refereed by Peco Bauwens. The defenses of both amateur teams created a deadlock in the first half of the match. Midway through the second half, Frossi scored first for the Azzurri. Kain Berger equalized for Austria, ten minutes before the end of regulation time. This is debated however, most modern sources crediting the Austrian goal to K. Kainberger, but contemporary Austrian newspapers listed Fuchsberger, with Kainberger providing the assist. Frossi got the winning goal for Italy just as extra time got underway and, failing to catch up in the remaining minutes, the Austrians lost. This win gave Italy its very first Olympic Football win in its first Olympic Football tournament.

1936 Summer Olympics Football Final
15 August 1936
16:00

Italy	2–1 (a.e.t.)	Austria
Frossi 70', 92'	Report	Kainberger 79'

Berlin Olympic Stadium (Berlin)
Attendance: 85,000
Referee: Peco Bauwens (Germany)

Team details

Italy	Austria

GK	Bruno Venturini
RB	Alfredo Foni
LB	Pietro Rava
RH	Giuseppe Baldo
CH	Achille Piccini
LH	Ugo Locatelli
OR	Annibale Frossi
IR	Libero Marchini
CF	Sergio Bertoni
IL	Carlo Biagi
OL	Francesco Gabriotti
Manager:
(Italy) Vittorio Pozzo

GK	Eduard Kainberger
RB	Ernst Künz
LB	Martin Kargl
RH	Anton Krenn
CH	Karl Wahlmüller
LH	Max Hofmeister
OR	Walter Werginz
IR	Adolf Laudon
CF	Klement Steinmetz
IL	Karl Kainberger
OL	Franz Fuchsberger
Manager:
(England) Jimmy Hogan

== Bracket ==
Round of 16
4 August – Berlin
Germany	9
Luxembourg	0
3 August – Berlin
Norway	4
Turkey	0
3 August – Berlin
Italy	1
United States	0
4 August – Berlin
Japan	3
Sweden	2
6 August – Berlin
Peru	7
Finland	3
5 August – Berlin
Austria	3
Egypt	1
5 August – Berlin
Poland	3
Hungary	0
6 August – Berlin
Great Britain	2
China	0

Quarter-finals
7 August – Berlin
Germany	0
Norway	2
7 August – Berlin
Italy	8
Japan	0
8 August – Berlin
Peru
Austria	w/o
8 August – Berlin
Poland	5
Great Britain	4

Semi-finals
10 August – Berlin
Norway	1
Italy (a.e.t.)	2
11 August – Berlin
Austria	3
Poland	1

Final
15 August – Berlin
Italy (a.e.t.)	2
Austria	1
Third place
13 August – Berlin
Norway	3
Poland	2

== Goalscorers ==
7 goals

- Annibale Frossi (Italy)

6 goals

- Teodoro Fernández (Peru)

5 goals

- Arne Brustad (Norway)
- Gerard Wodarz (Poland)

4 goals

- Carlo Biagi (Italy)
- Alejandro Villanueva (Peru)
- Hubert Gad (Poland)

3 goals

- Klement Steinmetz (Austria)
- Wilhelm Simetsreiter (Germany)
- Adolf Urban (Germany)

2 goals

- Karl Kainberger (Austria)
- Adolf Laudon (Austria)
- Josef Gauchel (Germany)
- (United Kingdom) Bernard Joy (Great Britain)
- Magnar Isaksen (Norway)
- Alf Martinsen (Norway)
- Erik Persson (Sweden)

1 goal

- Franz Mandl (Austria)
- Walter Werginz (Austria)
- Abdel-Karim Sakr (Egypt)
- Ernst Grönlund (Finland)
- William Kanerva (Finland)
- Pentti Larvo (Finland)
- Franz Elbern (Germany)
- (United Kingdom) Bertram Clements (Great Britain)
- (United Kingdom) John Dodds (Great Britain)
- (United Kingdom) Lester Finch (Great Britain)
- (United Kingdom) Edgar Shearer (Great Britain)
- Giulio Cappelli (Italy)
- Alfonso Negro (Italy)
- Taizo Kawamoto (Japan)
- Akira Matsunaga (Japan)
- Tokutaro Ukon (Japan)
- Reidar Kvammen (Norway)
- Jorge Alcalde (Peru)
- Teodor Peterek (Poland)
- Ryszard Piec (Poland)
