= Mrduljaš =

Mrduljaš is a surname. Notable people with the surname include:

- Ante Mrduljaš (fl. 1944–1947), Yugoslav politician
- Duško Mrduljaš (born 1951), Croatian rower
- Elko Mrduljaš (1909–1991), Croatian rower
