= Kargl =

Kargl is a surname. Notable people with the surname include:

- Gerald Kargl (born 1953), Austrian film director
- Mario Kargl (born 1986), Austrian tennis player
- Martin Kargl (1912–1946), Austrian footballer

== See also ==
- Karl (given name)
