= Marsilio =

Marsilio is an Italian name most likely to refer to:

- Marsilio Ficino (1433–1499), Italian scholar and Catholic priest

It may also refer to:

- Marco Marsilio (born 1968), Italian politician
- Marsilio da Carrara (1294–1338), Lord of Padua
- Marsilio Landriani (bishop) (1528–1609), Roman Catholic prelate and bishop of Vigevano
- Marsilio Rossi (1916–1942), Italian sprinter
- Marsilius of Padua (1275–1342), Italian scholar
- King Marsile in the Matter of France
