= Aage Jensen =

Aage Jensen may refer to:

- Aage Jensen (rowing) (1915–1995), Danish rowing coxswain
- Aage Rou Jensen (1924–2009), Danish international footballer
