= Tapie =

Tapie is a surname. Notable people with the surname include:

- Bernard Tapie (1943–2021), French businessman and politician
  - Tapie, French dramatized TV series on the life of Bernard Tapie (English title: Class Act)
- Georges Tapie (1910–1964), French rower
- Michel Tapié (1909–1987), French art critic, curator and collector
