= Gerhard Gustmann =

German rower

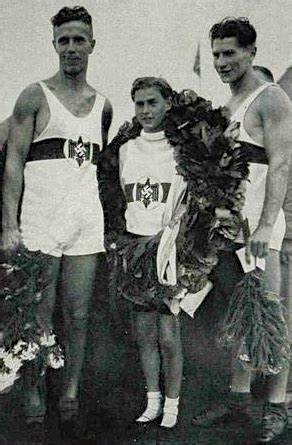
- Gustmann, left, during his medal ceremony

Personal information
- Born: 13 August 1910 Bonn
- Died: 30 March 1992 (aged 81) Bonn

Sport
- Sport: Rowing
- Club: Ruderverein Friesen; Skuller-Zelle
Medal record
Men's rowing
Representing Nazi Germany
Olympic Games
| Gold medal – first place | 1936 Berlin | Coxed pair |
European Rowing Championships
| Gold medal – first place | 1937 Amsterdam | Coxed pair |
| Silver medal – second place | 1938 Milan | Coxed pair |

Gerhard Gustmann (13 August 1910 – 30 March 1992) was a German rower, born in Bonn, who competed in the 1936 Summer Olympics.

In 1936 he won the gold medal as member of the German boat in the coxed pair competition.
