= Herbert Adamski =

German rower (1910–1941)

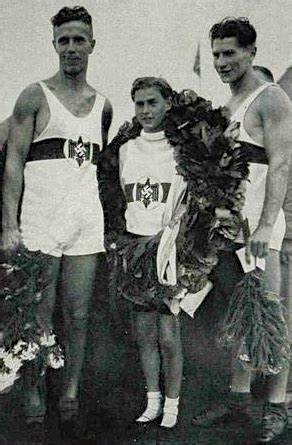
- Adamski, on the right, during his medal ceremony

Personal information
- Born: 30 April 1910 Berlin
- Died: 11 August 1941 (aged 31) Soviet Union

Sport
- Sport: Rowing
- Club: Ruderverein Friesen; Skuller-Zelle
Medal record
Men's rowing
Representing Nazi Germany
Olympic Games
Gold medal – first place	1936 Berlin	Coxed pair
European Rowing Championships
Gold medal – first place	1937 Amsterdam	Coxed pair
Silver medal – second place	1938 Milan	Coxed pair

Herbert Adamski (30 April 1910 – 11 August 1941) was a German rower from Berlin who competed in the 1936 Summer Olympics.

In 1936 he won the gold medal as a member of the German boat in the coxed pair competition. Between 1936 and 1939 he became German Champions. In 1937 he was a member of the German team which became European Champions, and was runners-up the following year. In 1939 Adamski also achieved German coxed fours champions.

He was killed during WWII, in 1941 while serving on the Eastern Front.
