= Tsutomu Mitsudome =

Japanese rower (1914–1945)

Personal information
- Nationality: Japanese
- Born: 7 December 1914
- Died: June 1945 (aged 30); Okinawa, Japanese Empire

Sport
- Sport: Rowing

Tsutomu Mitsudome (満留 勉, Mitsudome Tsutomu, 7 December 1914 – June 1945) was a Japanese rower. He competed in the men's coxed pair event at the 1936 Summer Olympics. He was killed in action during World War II.
