= Víctor Lavalle =

Peruvian footballer (1911–1975)

Personal information
- Full name: Víctor Guarderas Lavalle
- Date of birth: 5 June 1911
- Place of birth: Chorrillos, Peru
- Date of death: 10 October 1975 (aged 64)
- Place of death: La Victoria, Peru
- Height: 1.68 m (5 ft 6 in)
- Position: Defender

Youth career
- Club 9 de Diciembre
- 1928: Nacional del Rímac
- 1929–1932: Alianza Lima

Senior career*
Years	Team	Apps	(Gls)
1933–1937	Alianza Lima		

International career
1936	Peru	2	(0)
- * Club domestic league appearances and goals

Víctor Guarderas Lavalle (5 June 1911 – 10 October 1975), better known as Víctor Lavalle, was a Peruvian footballer who played as a defender. He competed in the men's tournament at the 1936 Summer Olympics.

== Biography ==
Víctor Lavalle joined Alianza Lima in 1929. He had to wait until 1933 to make his first-team debut, the year he won the Peruvian championship. He then formed Alianza's central defensive partnership with Juan Rostaing. However, it was with Arturo Fernández, a player for Universitario de Deportes – Alianza Lima's bitter rival – that he would form a formidable defensive duo. Indeed, Fernández joined Alianza for a tour of Chile, and the Lavalle-Fernández pairing caused a sensation, earning the nickname Pareja Tempestad (the thunderous couple) from the local and international press.

A Peruvian international, Víctor Lavalle participated in the 1936 Berlin Olympics, playing in both of his country's matches against Finland and Austria.

A promising defender, Lavalle's career came to a tragic end. On 8 November 1936, during a pre-season friendly in Buenos Aires for the 1937 South American Championship, he seriously injured Atlético Chalaco striker Jorge Chávez Boza. Boza died four days later following the amputation of his right leg (to prevent gangrene). Lavalle, considered responsible for this death, was ostracized by the public and forced to retire prematurely in 1937.

He died on 10 October 1975, in the El Porvenir neighborhood of the La Victoria district in Lima.

== Honours ==
Alianza Lima

- Peruvian Primera División: 1933
