= Almiro Bergamo =

Italian rower (1912–1994)

Personal information
- Born: 21 September 1912 Treporti
- Died: 5 July 1994 (aged 81) Treporti

Sport
- Sport: Rowing
Medal record
Men's rowing
Representing Italy
Olympic Games
Silver medal – second place	1936 Berlin	Coxed pair
European Championships
Gold medal – first place	1935 Berlin	Coxed pair
Silver medal – second place	1937 Amsterdam	Coxed pair
Gold medal – first place	1938 Milan	Coxed pair

Almiro Bergamo (20 September 1912 – 4 July 1994) was an Italian rower who competed in the 1936 Summer Olympics. He was, with Guido Santin, four times Italian champion and two times European champion with the coxed pairs (Italian duecon) rowing. He was born and died in Cavallino-Treporti.

In 1936 he won the silver medal as crew member of the Italian boat in the coxed pair event.

In 1985, he was nominated Italian Republic Knight by Sandro Pertini. He died on 4 July 1994 watching television during Italy vs Nigeria of Usa'94 soccer match.
