= Marceau Fourcade =

French rower

Olympic medal record

Men's rowing
Bronze medal – third place	1936 Berlin	Coxed pair

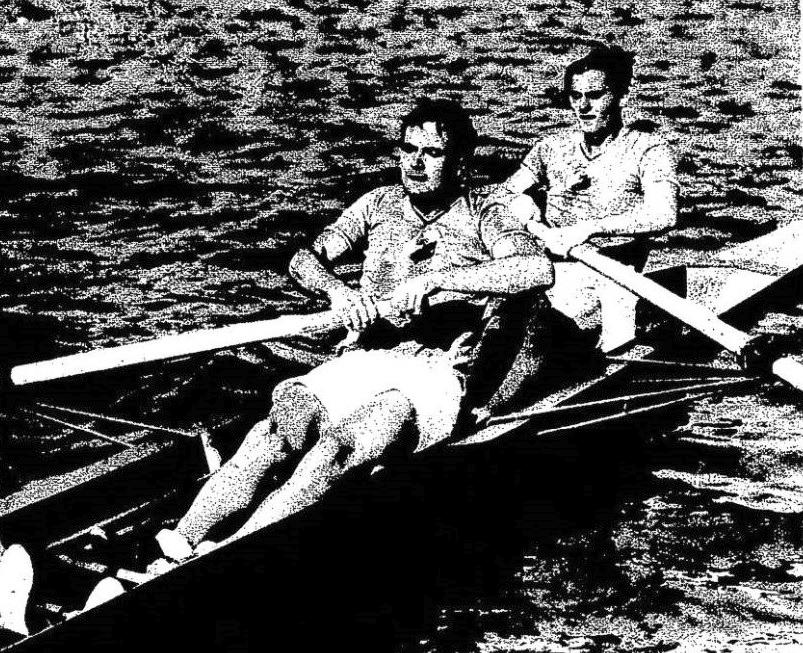
Marceau Fourcade (L.) and Georges Tapie (R.), from Bône, third at the 1936 Olympics in two with coxswain.jpg

Marceau Roger Fourcade (26 January 1905 – after 1936) was a French rower who competed in the 1936 Summer Olympics. He was born in Bône, French Algeria.

In 1936 he won the bronze medal as crew member of the French boat in the coxed pairs event.
