= Armando Frigo =

Italian-American soccer player (1917–1943)

Personal information
- Date of birth: 5 August 1917
- Place of birth: Clinton, Indiana, United States
- Date of death: 10 September 1943 (aged 26)
- Place of death: Crkvice, Nazi Croatia
- Position: Midfielder

Senior career*
Years	Team	Apps	(Gls)
1934–1939	ACIVI Vicenza	92	(36)
1939–1942	Fiorentina	46	(7)
1942–1943	Spezia	6	(0)
- * Club domestic league appearances and goals as of end of 1942–43 season

Armando Frigo (5 August 1917 – 10 September 1943) was an Italian-American football (soccer) player who played as a midfielder. He was known as the second American-born player after Alfonso Negro to have played in Serie A.

== Early life ==
Frigo was born in Clinton, Indiana, to Italian parents. When he was eight, his family decided to relocate to Vicenza, where he grew up.

== Football career ==
Frigo started with his hometown team Vicenza in Serie C. He was transferred to Fiorentina for the 1937–39 season, where he played 21 games and scored five goals. He went on to play a total of 46 games and scored seven goals. At the end of the 1941–42 season, he moved on to play for Spezia in Serie B.

== Death ==
Armando Frigo served as a second lieutenant in the Italian Army infantry during World War II. When Italy entered civil war following the armistice with the Allies, he joined the partisans. In September 1943, he was captured by the Nazis near the town of Crkvice and shot to death. In his wallet was found his Fiorentina membership card.
