= Hans Appenzeller =

Swiss rower

Personal information
- Born: Hans J. Appenzeller; 14 March 1899
- Died: unknown

Sport
- Sport: Rowing
- Club: See-Club Zürich
Medal record
Men's rowing
Representing Switzerland
European Rowing Championships
Gold medal – first place	1932 Belgrade	Coxless pair

Hans J. Appenzeller (14 March 1899 – ?) was a Swiss rower.

Appenzeller was born in 1899. He was a member of the See-Club Zürich, a rowing club in Zürich. He competed at the 1936 Summer Olympics in Berlin with the men's coxed pair where they came fifth.
