= Georges Gschwind =

Swiss rower

Personal information
- Nationality: Swiss
- Born: 27 August 1909
- Died: 14 March 1995 (aged 85)

Sport
- Sport: Rowing

Georges Gschwind (27 August 1909 – 14 March 1995) was a Swiss rower. He competed in the men's coxed pair event at the 1936 Summer Olympics.
