= Rolf Spring =

Swiss rower

Personal information
- Born: 19 March 1917 Zürich, Switzerland
- Died: 2005 Zürich, Switzerland

Sport
- Sport: Rowing
Medal record
Men's rowing
Representing Switzerland
Olympic Games
Silver medal – second place	1936 Berlin	Coxed four

Rolf Spring (19 March 1917 – 2005) was a Swiss rower who competed in the 1936 Summer Olympics.

In 1936, he was the coxswain of the Swiss boat which won the silver medal in the coxed four event. He also coxed the Swiss boat in the coxed pair competition when they finished fifth and in the eight event when they finished sixth.
