= Karel Hardeman =

Dutch rower

Personal information
- Nationality: Dutch
- Born: 29 June 1914; Surabaya, Dutch East Indies
- Died: 5 October 2010 (aged 96); The Hague, Netherlands

Sport
- Sport: Rowing

Karel Hardeman (29 June 1914 – 5 October 2010) was a Dutch rower. He competed in the men's coxed pair event at the 1936 Summer Olympics.
