= Magdalon Monsen =

Norwegian footballer (1910-1953)

Olympic medal record

Men's Football
Bronze medal – third place	1936 Berlin	Team competition

Magdalon Monsen (19 April 1910 – 4 September 1953 in Stockholm) was a Norwegian football (soccer) player who competed in the 1936 Summer Olympics. He was a member of the Norwegian team, which won the bronze medal in the football tournament. Monsen died of complications after brain surgery.
