= Dieter Arend =

German rower

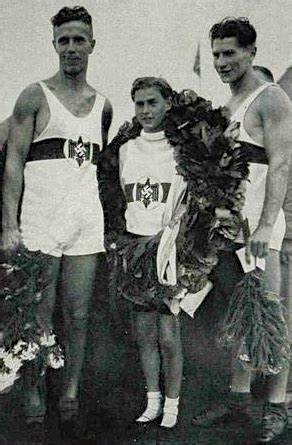
- Arend, center, during his medal ceremony

Personal information
- Born: August 14, 1914
- Died: October 16, 1987 (aged 73)

Sport
- Sport: Rowing
- Club: Ruderverein Am Wannsee / Skuller-Zelle
Medal record
Men's rowing
Representing Nazi Germany
Olympic Games
Gold medal – first place	1936 Berlin	Coxed pair

Dieter Arend (14 August 1914 – 16 October 1987) was a German rower who competed in the 1936 Summer Olympics.

In 1936 he won the gold medal as coxswain of the German boat in the coxed pair competition.
