= Decio Klettenberg =

Brazilian rower (1902–1986)

Personal information
- Full name: Decio Klettenberg Couto
- Nationality: Brazilian
- Born: 19 June 1902
- Died: 4 September 1986 (aged 84)

Sport
- Sport: Rowing

Decio Klettenberg (19 June 1902 – 4 September 1986) was a Brazilian rower. He competed in the men's coxed pair event at the 1936 Summer Olympics.
