= Ivo Fabris =

Yugoslav rower

Personal information
- Born: 12 March 1910
- Died: 9 September 1992 (aged 82) Split, Croatia

Sport
- Sport: Rowing
- Club: HVK Gusar
Medal record
Men's rowing
Representing Yugoslavia
European Rowing Championships
Gold medal – first place	1932 Belgrade	Eight
Bronze medal – third place	1934 Lucerne	Coxed four

Ivo Fabris (12 March 1910 – 9 September 1992) was a Yugoslav rower. He competed at the 1936 Summer Olympics in Berlin with the men's coxed pair where they came sixth.
