= Fredrik Horn =

Norwegian footballer (1916-1997)

Olympic medal record

Men's Football
Bronze medal – third place	1936 Berlin	Team competition

Fredrik Horn (8 June 1916 – 18 November 1997) was a Norwegian association football player who competed in the 1936 Summer Olympics. He was a member of the Norwegian team, which won the bronze medal in the football tournament.
