= Hans van Walsem =

Dutch rower

Personal information
- Nationality: Dutch
- Born: 14 December 1916 Weltevreden, Batavia, Dutch East Indies
- Died: 2 January 1943 (aged 26) Neuengamme, Nazi Germany

Sport
- Sport: Rowing

Hans van Walsem (14 December 1916 – 2 January 1943) was a Dutch rower. He competed in the men's coxed pair event at the 1936 Summer Olympics. He was killed in the Neuengamme concentration camp during World War II.
