= Luigi Scarabello =

Italian footballer

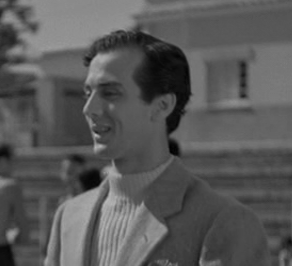

Personal information
- Date of birth: 17 June 1916
- Place of birth: Albiano Magra, Italy
- Date of death: 2 July 2007 (aged 91)
- Place of death: Nettuno, Italy
- Position: Midfielder

Senior career*
Years	Team	Apps	(Gls)
1933–1936	Spezia	50	(10)
1936–1941	Genoa	109	(23)
1946–1947	Taranto	5	(0)

International career
1936–1939	Italy	2	(0)

Managerial career
- 1949–1950: Spezia
- 1952: Spezia
- 1957: Spezia
- 1958–1959: Spezia
- 1965–1966: Spezia
Medal record
Representing Italy
Summer Olympics
Gold medal – first place	Summer Olympics	1936 Berlin
- * Club domestic league appearances and goals

Luigi Scarabello (Italian pronunciation: [luˈiːdʒi skaraˈbɛllo]; 17 June 1916 – 2 July 2007) was an Italian footballer who played as a midfielder, and who competed in the 1936 Summer Olympics. He was a member of the Italian team, which won the gold medal in the 1936 Olympic football tournament.

== Honours ==
=== International ===
Italy

- Olympic Gold Medal: 1936
