= Max Hofmeister =

Austrian footballer (1913–2000)

Olympic medal record

Men's Football
| Silver medal – second place | 1936 Berlin | Team competition |

Max Hofmeister (22 March 1913 – 12 April 2000) was an Austrian football player who competed in the 1936 Summer Olympics. He was part of the Austrian team, which won the silver medal in the football tournament. He played all four matches as midfielder.
