= Aage Jensen (rowing) =

Danish rower

Personal information
- Born: Aage Ulrik Jensen; 13 December 1915 Copenhagen, Denmark
- Died: 25 January 1995 (aged 79) Copenhagen, Denmark

Sport
- Sport: Rowing
- Club: Københavns Roklub
Medal record
Men's rowing
Representing Denmark
European Rowing Championships
Bronze medal – third place	1937 Amsterdam	Eight

Aage Ulrik Jensen (13 December 1915 – 25 January 1995) was a Danish coxswain. He competed at the 1936 Summer Olympics in Berlin with the men's coxed pair where they came fourth.
