= Luciano Negrini =

Italian rower

Personal information
- Born: 22 June 1920 Venice
- Died: 12 December 2012 (aged 92)

Sport
- Sport: Rowing
Medal record
Men's rowing
Representing Italy
Olympic Games
Silver medal – second place	1936 Berlin	Coxed pair

Luciano Negrini (22 June 1920 – 12 December 2012) was an Italian rower who competed in the 1936 Summer Olympics. He was born in Venice. In 1936 he won the silver medal as coxswain of the Italian boat in the coxed pairs event.
