= Filonovo, Voronezh Oblast =

Filonovo Филоново
- Selo
- Location within Voronezh Oblast Location within Russia
- Coordinates: 50°02′N 40°29′E
- Country: Russia
- Region: Voronezh Oblast
- District: Bogucharsky District
- Time zone: UTC+3:00

Filonovo (Russian: Филоново) is a rural locality (a selo) and the administrative center of Filonovskoye Rural Settlement, Bogucharsky District, Voronezh Oblast, Russia. The population was 596 as of 2010. There are 11 streets.

== Geography ==
Filonovo is located 15 km north of Boguchar (the district's administrative centre) by road. Pereshchepnoye is the nearest rural locality.
