= Estevam Strata =

Brazilian rower

Personal information
- Born: 21 April 1899; São Paulo, Brazil
- Died: 12 April 1973 (aged 73)

Sport
- Sport: Rowing

Estevam Strata (21 April 1899 – 12 April 1973) was a Brazilian rower. He competed at the 1932 Summer Olympics and the 1936 Summer Olympics.
