= José Ramalho (rower) =

Brazilian rower (1901–1967)

Personal information
- Born: 15 March 1901; Curitiba, Brazil
- Died: 14 April 1967 (aged 66); São Paulo, Brazil
- Height: 180 cm (5 ft 11 in)

Sport
- Country: Brazil
- Sport: Rowing
- Club: Associação Atlética São Paulo

José Ramalho (15 March 1901 – 14 April 1967), also known as Joao Ramalho, was a Brazilian rower. He competed at the 1932 Summer Olympics and the 1936 Summer Olympics.
