= Klement Steinmetz =

Austrian footballer (1915–2001)

Olympic medal record

Men's Football
Silver medal – second place	1936 Berlin	Team competition

Klement Steinmetz (23 March 1915 – 2 May 2001) was an Austrian football (soccer) player who competed in the 1936 Summer Olympics. He was part of the Austrian team, which won the silver medal in the football tournament. He played three matches as forward and scored three goals.
