= Tom Curran (rower) =

American rower (1910–1990)

Personal information
- Born: September 27, 1910 Philadelphia, Pennsylvania, United States
- Died: July 5, 1990 (aged 79) Somers Point, New Jersey, United States

Sport
- Sport: Rowing

Tom Curran (September 27, 1910 – July 5, 1990) was an American rower.

He competed in the men's coxed pair event at the 1936 Summer Olympics.
