= Georges Tapie =

French rower (1910–1964)

Olympic medal record

Men's rowing
Bronze medal – third place	1936 Berlin	Coxed pair

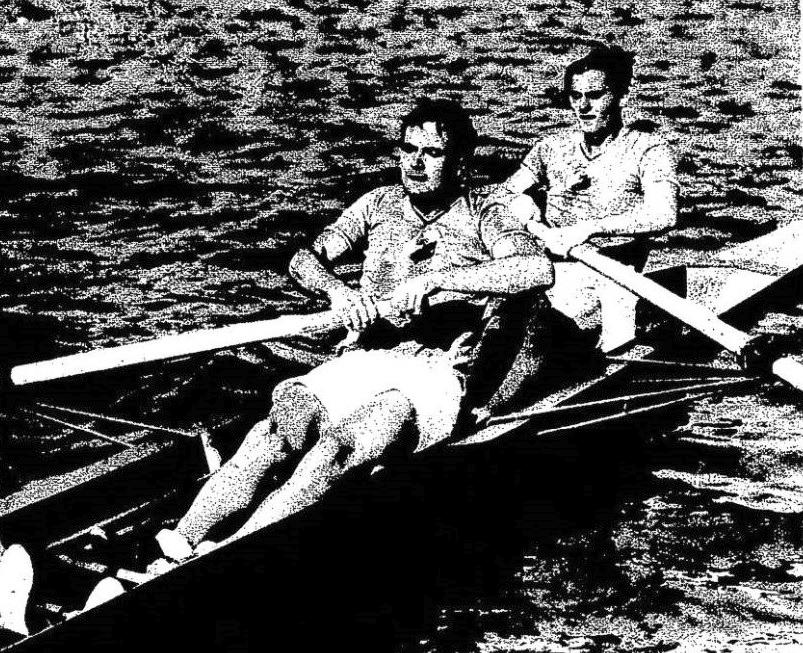
Marceau Fourcade (G.) and Georges Tapie (D.), de Bône, third at the 1936 Olympics in two with a helmsman.

Georges Tapie (19 February 1910 – 2 January 1964) was a French rower who competed in the 1936 Summer Olympics.

In 1936 he won the bronze medal as crew member of the French boat in the coxed pairs event.
