= Bertram Clements =

English footballer

Personal information
- Full name: Bertram Arthur Clements
- Date of birth: 1 December 1913
- Place of birth: England
- Date of death: July 2000 (aged 86)

Senior career*
| Years | Team | Apps | (Gls) |
- Casuals

International career
| 1936 | Great Britain | 1 | (1) |
- * Club domestic league appearances and goals

Bertram Arthur Clements (1 December 1913 – July 2000) was an English footballer who represented Great Britain at the 1936 Summer Olympics. Clements played amateur football for Casuals. He also played cricket for Norfolk at minor counties level, making 49 appearances in the Minor Counties Championship either side of the Second World War.
