= Josef Kitzmüller =

Austrian footballer (1912–1979)

Olympic medal record

Men's Football
Silver medal – second place	1936 Berlin	Team competition

Josef Kitzmüller (21 June 1912 – 14 May 1979) was an Austrian football (soccer) player who competed in the 1936 Summer Olympics. He was part of the Austrian team, which won the silver medal in the football tournament. He played two matches as forward.
