= Anton Krenn =

Austrian footballer (1911–1993)

Olympic medal record

Men's Football
Silver medal – second place	1936 Berlin	Team competition

Anton Krenn (18 April 1911 – 29 March 1993) was an Austrian football player who competed in the 1936 Summer Olympics. He was part of the Austrian team that won the silver medal in the football tournament. He played in all four matches as a midfielder.
