= Giulio Cappelli =

Italian footballer

Personal information
- Date of birth: 4 March 1911
- Place of birth: La Spezia, Italy
- Date of death: 16 December 1995 (aged 84)
- Place of death: Massa, Italy
- Position: Forward

Senior career*
Years	Team	Apps	(Gls)
1929–1933	Spezia	109	(29)
1933–1935	Livorno	40	(3)
1935–1936	Viareggio	33	(7)
1936–1938	Lucchese	12	(0)
1938–1940	Spezia	22	(6)
1940–1941	Liguria	1	(0)
1942–1943	Massese	15	(6)

International career
1936	Italy	2	(1)

Managerial career
- 1947–1948: Lucchese
- 1949–1950: Inter Milan
- 1952–1953: Catania
- 1960: Inter Milan
- 1962–1963: Como
- 1965–1966: Chieti
- 1966–1967: Alessandria
Medal record
Representing Italy
Summer Olympics
Gold medal – first place	Summer Olympics	1936 Berlin
- * Club domestic league appearances and goals

Giulio Cappelli (Italian pronunciation: [ˈdʒuːljo kapˈpɛlli]; 4 March 1911 – 16 December 1995) was an Italian footballer who played as a forward. He competed in the 1936 Summer Olympics with the Italy national football team, winning a gold medal in the tournament.

== Club career ==
Born in La Spezia, Cappelli began his football career with local side Spezia. He joined Serie A side Livorno for two seasons beginning in 1933. The next season, he transferred to Serie B club F.C. Esperia Viareggio. Cappelli returned to Serie A with S.S.D. Sporting Lucchese and finished his playing career with Spezia.

== International career ==
Cappelli made two appearances for Italy in 1936, scoring one goal. He was a member of the Italian Olympic team, which won the gold medal in the 1936 Olympic football tournament.

== Death ==
On 16 December 1995, Cappelli died at his home in Marina di Massa aged 84.

== Honours ==
=== International ===
Italy

- Olympic Gold Medal: 1936
