= Franz Elbern =

German footballer (1910–2002)

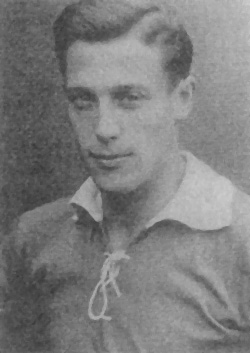
- Franz Elbern in 1937/38

Personal information
- Date of birth: 1 November 1910
- Date of death: 23 February 2002 (aged 91)
- Position: Forward

Senior career*
Years	Team	Apps	(Gls)
- SV Beuel 06

International career
1935–1937	Germany	8	(2)
- * Club domestic league appearances and goals

Franz Elbern (1 November 1910 – 23 February 2002) was a German international footballer.

== Biography ==
Franz Elbern’s father worked for the German civil administration. Shortly before the end of World War I, the family fled to Beuel, since 1969 a part of the city of Bonn. Five of the sons played for the youth team of the local club SV 06 Beuel. When the boys were promoted to the first XI, after a few years, in 1935-36, the club rose to the Gauliga level, Germany’s first division at the time. Three of the brothers were included in the team representing the Central Rhineland by the later national coach Sepp Herberger. Herberger also recommended Franz Elbern, a speedy right-winger, to the acting national coach Otto Nerz, who fielded him for the first time in 1935 in the national team’s game against Luxembourg. In the Olympic tournament he played Luxembourg again. Until 1937 he wore the German colors eight times, scoring two goals, before a broken shinbone suffered in a club game terminated his international career. He came back to play for his local team only one year later.

During the war he was stationed in Pomerania and, in 1940-41, competed for the local club SV Germania Stolp. After the war he continued to play for his home club for many years, contesting his last official game in 1955 at the age of 45. On the occasion of his 50th birthday a selection of players from Beuel played against a team consisting of eleven players from the Elbern family in his honor. Franz Elbern was a carpenter and boat-builder, later carrier employed by the city of Bonn. After his death at the age of 91, the stadium in Beuel was named after him.
