= Carlo Biagi =

Italian footballer (1914–1986)

Personal information
- Date of birth: 20 April 1914
- Place of birth: Viareggio, Italy
- Date of death: 16 April 1986 (aged 71)
- Place of death: Milan, Italy
- Position: Midfielder

Senior career*
Years	Team	Apps	(Gls)
1930–1933	Viareggio	82	(31)
1933–1934	Prato	26	(11)
1935–1936	Viareggio	28	(12)
1933–1934	Pisa	29	(6)
1934–1940	Napoli	66	(11)

International career
1936	Italy	4	(4)
Medal record
Representing Italy
Summer Olympics
Gold medal – first place	Summer Olympics	1936 Berlin
- * Club domestic league appearances and goals

Carlo Biagi (Italian pronunciation: [ˈkarlo ˈbjaːdʒi]; 20 April 1914 – 16 April 1986) was an Italian footballer who played as a midfielder.

== Career ==
Biagi played club football for Pisa SC. Biagi competed in the 1936 Summer Olympics, and was a member of the Italy team which won the gold medal in the football tournament.

== Honours ==
=== International ===
Italy

- Olympic Gold Medal: 1936

== International goals ==
No.	Date	Venue	Opponent	Score	Result	Competition
1.	7 August 1936	Berlin, Germany	Japan	2–0	8–0	1936 Summer Olympics
2.	7 August 1936	Berlin, Germany	Japan	3–0	8–0	1936 Summer Olympics
3.	7 August 1936	Berlin, Germany	Japan	6–0	8–0	1936 Summer Olympics
4.	7 August 1936	Berlin, Germany	Japan	7–0	8–0	1936 Summer Olympics
