= Walter Werginz =

Austrian footballer (1913–1944)

Olympic medal record

Men's Football
Silver medal – second place	1936 Berlin	Team competition

Walter Werginz (18 February 1913 – 21 March 1944) was an Austrian football (soccer) player who competed in the 1936 Summer Olympics. He was part of the Austrian team, which won the silver medal in the football tournament. He played all four matches as forward and scored two goals.

He was killed in action during World War II, when serving under command of Nazi Germany on the Russian Front in Ukraine in March 1944 aged 31.
