= Ernst de Jonge =

Dutch rower and lawyer

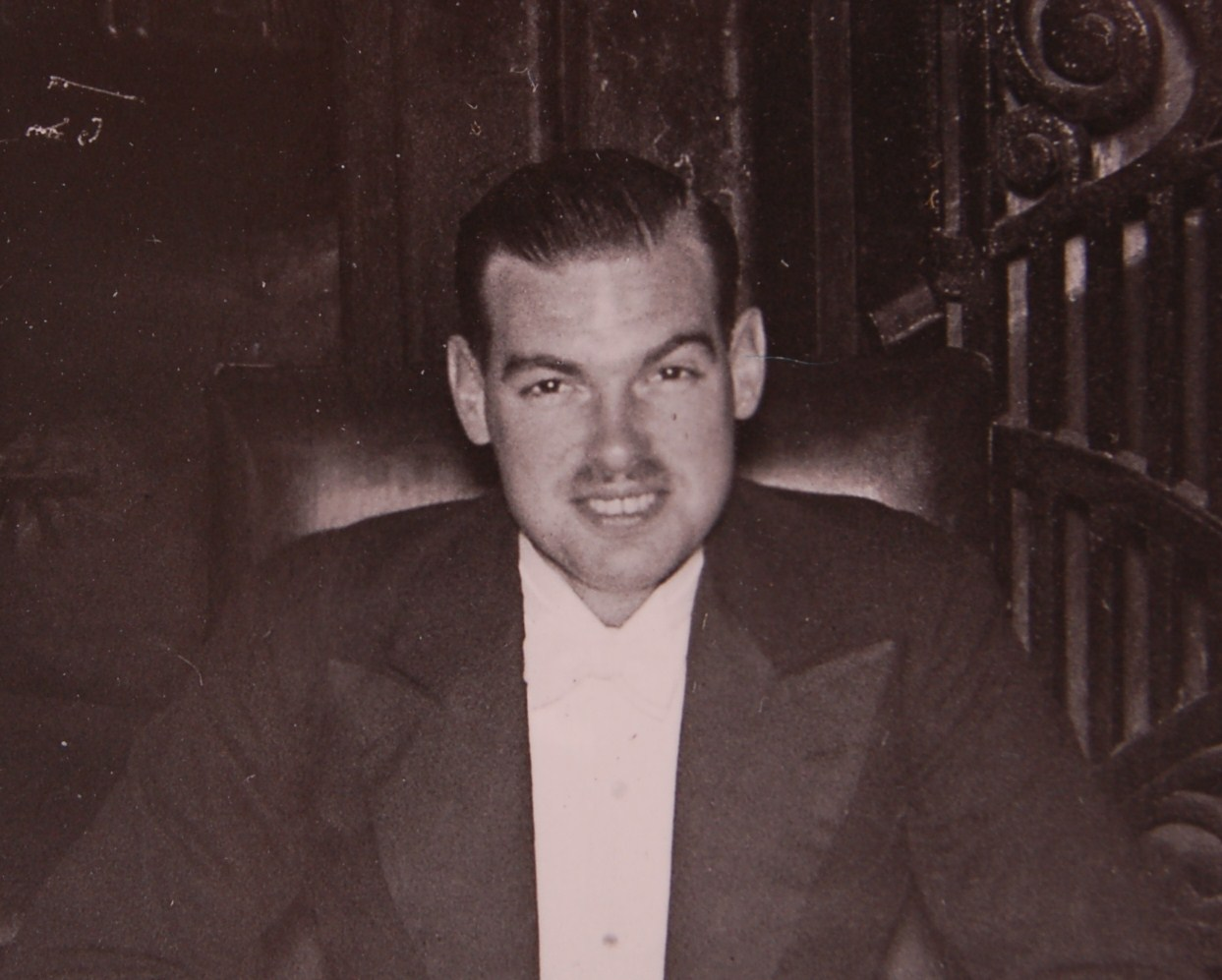
- De Jonge in 1937
- Born: Ernst Willem de Jonge; 22 May 1914; Sinabang, Dutch East Indies
- Died: 3 September 1944 (aged 30); Rawicz (prison), Poland
- Occupations: Olympic rower, lawyer
- Military career
- Allegiance: Netherlands
- Branch: Centrale Inlichtingendienst; Dutch resistance
- Service years: 1940–1944
- Awards: Bronze Lion; Resistance Memorial Cross

Ernst Willem de Jonge (22 May 1914 – 3 September 1944) was a lawyer and Olympic rower who volunteered to serve in the Dutch resistance during the Second World War. He was captured in May 1942, interrogated and moved through several concentration camps. He died in a prison in German-occupied Poland in September 1944.

== Early life ==
De Jonge was the youngest son of Johan Maurits de Jonge and his wife Pauline Clasina Berg. They were not wealthy but they were Jonkheer, with a long family history. His father was an engineer. The family moved to Sumatra in the Dutch East Indies when his father accepted a post with the Java Timber Company and a few years later to Semarang on Java. De Jonge was born in the town of Sinabang on Simeulue. He was the second son and the youngest in a family of four children. His brother Marien was the oldest child in the family, three years older than Ernst. As a youngster De Jonge was known for being rambunctious, intelligent and at times reckless. De Jonge was eleven when his father was appointed director of the Combined Javanese Timber Companies in Amsterdam in 1925 and the family returned to the Netherlands. He was sent to Baarnsch Lyceum in the Dutch city of Baarn for his schooling, where he was expelled three times for a lack of discipline. He was always allowed back in because he was warmhearted and charming. He passed his final exam and graduated just after his 18th birthday.

== Military service and Leiden ==
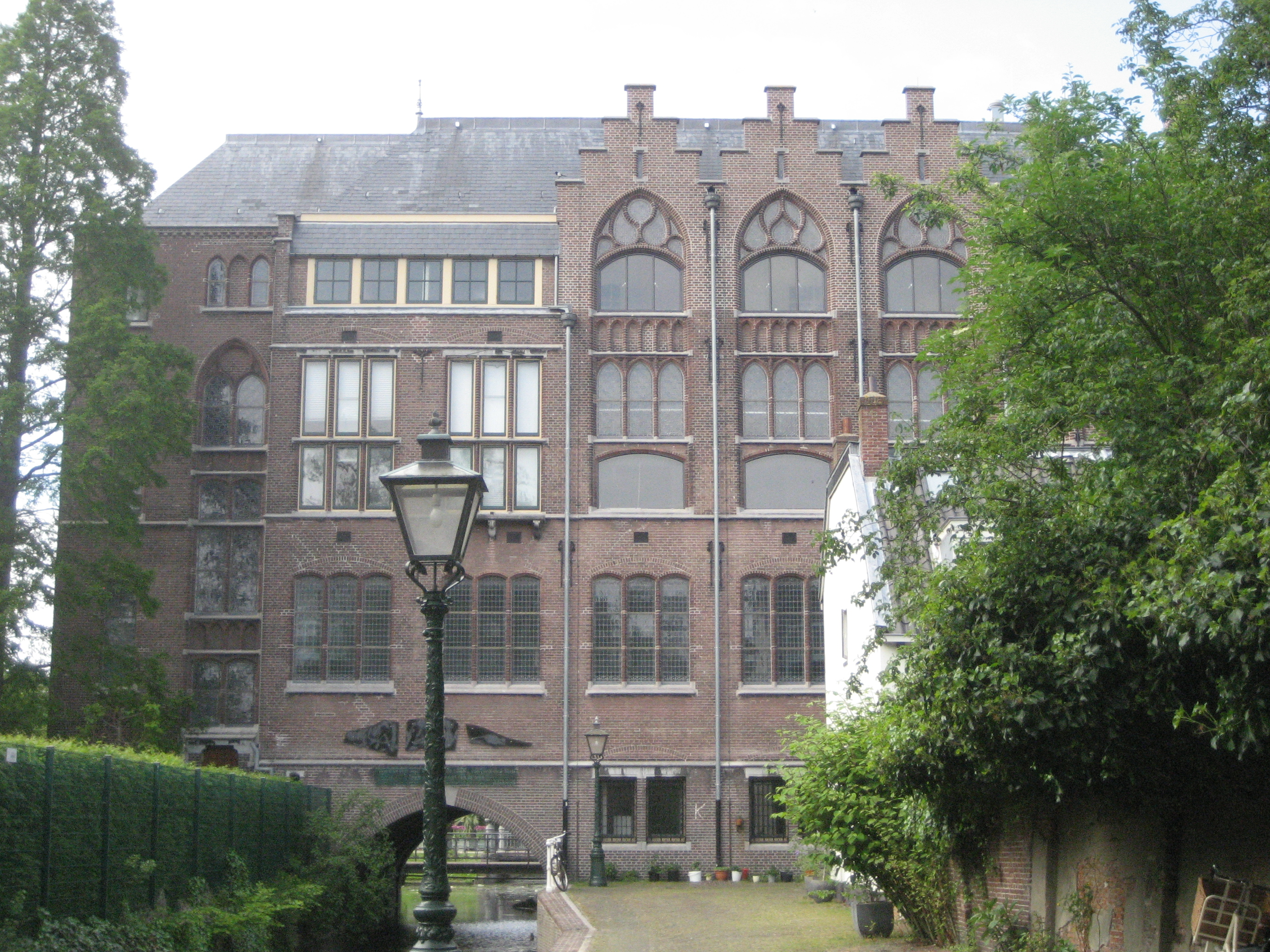
Leiden University

He was sent to Ede for his obligatory military service. After eight months he was made an officer. In 1933 he was transferred to the artillery in Leiden. While there he "borrowed" a junior officer's horse so that he could go on a trip. This episode garnered him a poor conduct report, which initially blocked him from advancing in rank. He received his next step as an officer a year later. Said his brother Marien, many years later: "He had the reputation of being the most penalized cadet in the history of the armed forces. The stories even reached the top of the army, which led to an angry letter from the higher ups asking why this troublemaker had not yet been sent out of the service. The commanding officer replied, "He's a wild boy, but if the fatherland is ever in the war, he'll be of great value."

Following his military service he attended the University of Leiden. De Jonge was an active member of the Leidsch Student Corps 'Minerva society'. He was a member of Minerva's rowing association, KSRV Njord, and was selected president of the rowing club. He competed in the 'fours with coxswain' race in the Varsity rowing regatta in the North Sea Canal in the spring of 1936. Early that summer he and childhood friend Karel Hardeman competed as a pair, joined by Johan Frans Van Walsem as coxswain. They competed in the Olympic trials meet and placed second, however the team that won the trials turned out to be Germans, so they were selected to represent the Netherlands at the 1936 Summer Olympics in Berlin. During that summer while preparing for the Olympics De Jonge and Hardeman both completed their undergraduate work and passed exams. As rowers they were both smallish, 69 and 71 kilograms respectively, and they were using an older Njord club boat. At the games they failed to make the cut out of the preliminary round with a time of 7.56.9. In the repechage rowed the following day they came in with a time of 9.03.1, failing to make the cut again, and were eliminated from the competition.

Varsity rowing regatta, 'fours with coxswain', 1938

Following the Olympics De Jong returned to Leiden, where he studied the law. In the spring he again competed at the 'Varsity' regatta of 1937, now racing a distance of 2000 meters due to the race being held at Bosbaan. In 1937–1938 he was president of the student union in Leiden. During the hazing initiation of incoming plebes of his student corps, De Jonge threw a soup tureen at a group of new students, striking Erik Hazelhoff Roelfzema in the head and cutting his scalp. His accidental striking of Hazelhoff was the basis for their forming a friendship.

Although involved in a number of extracurricular activities which distracted from his studies, De Jonge was quite bright and was at the head of his class. He took oral exams and graduated three months before his classmates in May 1938. He nearly caught up with his older brother, Marien, who had started his studies two years before him.

His first job was at the Bataafse Petroleum Maatschappij and was posted to their office in London. In August 1939 he was called back to the Netherlands to fulfill his obligation to the military. He rejoined his artillery battery, but a short time later BPM requested the Department of Defense release him because they urgently needed him for a job overseas. Because of the increasing threat of war, BPM was secretly making preparations to move their headquarters from The Hague to a temporary office on the island of Curacao in the Dutch Antilles. Preparations for the move gave rise to a significant number of legal problems. "The task of solving these matters was addressed to Professor Oppenheim, Leiden's Business Lawyer. He accepted the job on condition that he could take his best student as assistant: the recently graduated Ernst De Jonge." With the German invasion of the Netherlands on 10 May 1940, the move of BPM headquarters was made.

== Dutch resistance ==
De Jonge found his work with BPM challenging and interesting, and he enjoyed living in the Dutch Antilles. However, with the German occupation of his homeland, his mind was with his family and friends in the Netherlands. Queen Wilhelmina had fled to London and established the government in exile there. De Jonge used his influence with Prince Bernhard, the German born husband of Princess Juliana, to secure his release from BPM.

De Jonge arrived in London on 31 August 1941 and was immediately interrogated by the British Secret Service. At the end of the interrogation, and partially due to De Jonge's attitude throughout, he was asked if he would consider serving as an agent in occupied Netherlands. He had already been considering this on his own, and he agreed. Before starting his training, he spoke on Radio Oranje directed at the Netherlands. During his training De Jonge was not impressed with the Centrale Inlichtingendienst (Dutch Central Intelligence Service), which administered the operations, but he was impressed with British Military Intelligence Section 9, which did the training work. He was instructed in Morse coding and decoding, security measures and training in the organization and ranks in the German army. While training in London he met his older brother Marien. Marien would ship out with the Princess Irene Brigade to the far east in March. De Jonge was scheduled to return to the Netherlands at any time. In February the two brothers took leave of each other at Paddington Station, knowing well they might not see each other again.

By 1942 De Jonge was ready for his mission. The initial plan was for he and his radio operator Evert Radema to be dropped by parachute, but this was abandoned in favor of the transport service that had been developed by Erik Hazelhoff Roelfzema, Peter Tazelaar and Chris Krediet, which used a motor torpedo boat to cross the English Channel before rowing the party to shore. On 22 February 1942, De Jonge and Evert Radema were inserted into the Netherlands at Katwijk. They were rowed to the beach with Hazelhoff, who came ashore with them and helped them to a hiding place near the boulevard where they could wait for the first morning tram leaving for Leiden. From Leiden the two split up, with Evert Radema heading to Amsterdam while De Jonge went to Wassenaar.

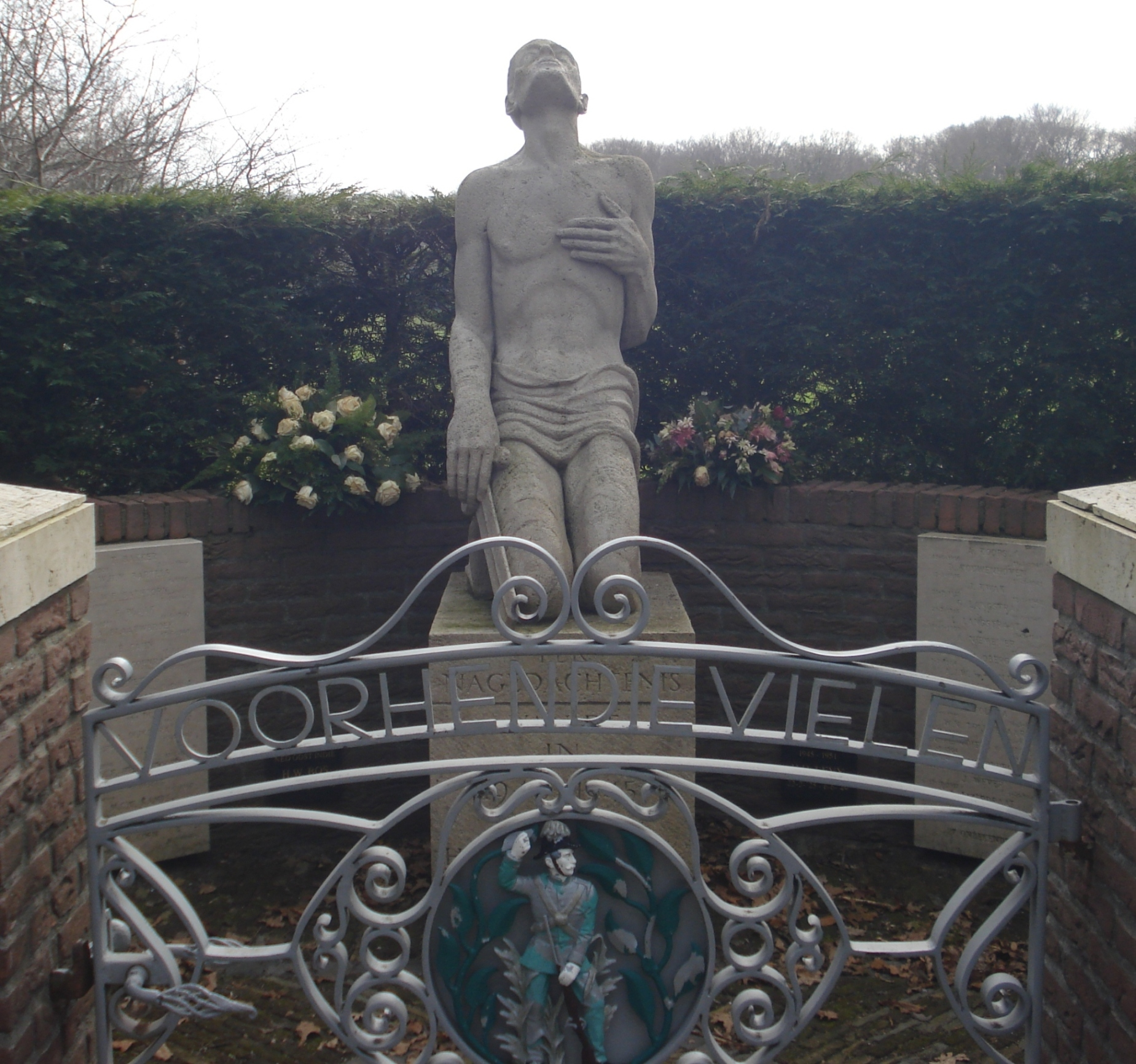
Wassenaar memorial: 'In memory for those who fell for the fatherland 1940–1945'

De Jonge was not a likely candidate as a secret operative, as his dark looks were striking and well recognized. Nevertheless, he set about making contacts with the resistance. He traveled to Rotterdam where he met up with Maarten Reuchlin and Leen Pot. Soon De Jonge had set up an organization which could gather information, largely through his many friends and former students. He was careful to not make any student or friend he was working with aware of any other. De Jonge worked closely with Kees Dutilh, and together with Dutilh and Leen Pot they established a spy group they called the 'Kees Group'.

Some three months after De Jonge's drop, a courier on his way to England was picked up by the secret police. He was carrying three rolls of microfilm which contained a detailed report by De Jonge. De Jonge heard about the arrest, but refused to go into hiding. Three days later, on 22 May, De Jonge and two of his fellow agents were arrested at an apartment in Rotterdam. While being transported away in a car the following day he was able to shout 'Hello' to a classmate he knew at Leids, thus letting the organization know that he had been taken into custody. Hazelhoff did not hear from him again. They were brought to Kamp Haaren. From there they were transferred to Assen. He and a group of 52 others were sent to a prison in Rawitsch in occupied by Germans Poland. Of that group, 47 were sent over to Mauthausen-Gusen concentration camp, where they were executed. De Jonge remained with four others in prison at Rawicz. He died there in September 1944. At the time of his death he was 30 years old. His remains were never found.

The Kees group remained active until the end of the war. De Jonge was replaced by Pierre Louis d'Aulnis de Bourouill (Louis d'Aulnis), who sent their messages further.

== Soldaat Van Oranje ==
In the late 1960s De Jonge's friend, writer Erik Hazelhoff Roelfzema, began to work on writing down the story of what had happened to them during the war. De Jonge and many of their classmates were spoken of in the book. It was published in 1970 under the title "Het Hol Van De Ratelslang" (The Rattlesnake Cave), and later called "Soldaat Van Oranje" (Soldier of Orange), for Hazelhoff's association with the royal family. The book became an international bestseller. Prominent Dutch film maker Paul Verhoeven took an interest in the book and brought it to the screen. He cast Jeroen Krabbé in his first major role to play Guus LeJeune, the friend of Hazelhoff Roelfzema's character, which was based on a combination of De Jonge and Peter Tazelaar. Rutger Hauer played the part of Erik Hazelhoff Roelfzema. The film won the Los Angeles Film Critics Association Award for Best Foreign Film in 1979. One year later, in 1980, it received a Golden Globe nomination for Best Foreign Language Film.

== Memorial at Leiden ==
When the war ended De Jonge's older brother Marien returned to the Netherlands and was reunited with his wife and son. Nine months later they had a second son, which they named Ernst in memory of Marien's younger brother. When Marien reached 100 years of age a celebration was held for him, and though happy to be with all his family, he asked ‘Waarom word ik honderd en is mijn broer zo vroeg gestorven?’("Why did I live to be a hundred and my brother died so young?") His family started a fund to raise money for a memorial to his brother. On March 9, 2012, a casting of De Jonge was placed in the Minerva Society at Leiden. Marien de Jonge spoke of his brother at the unveiling ceremony.

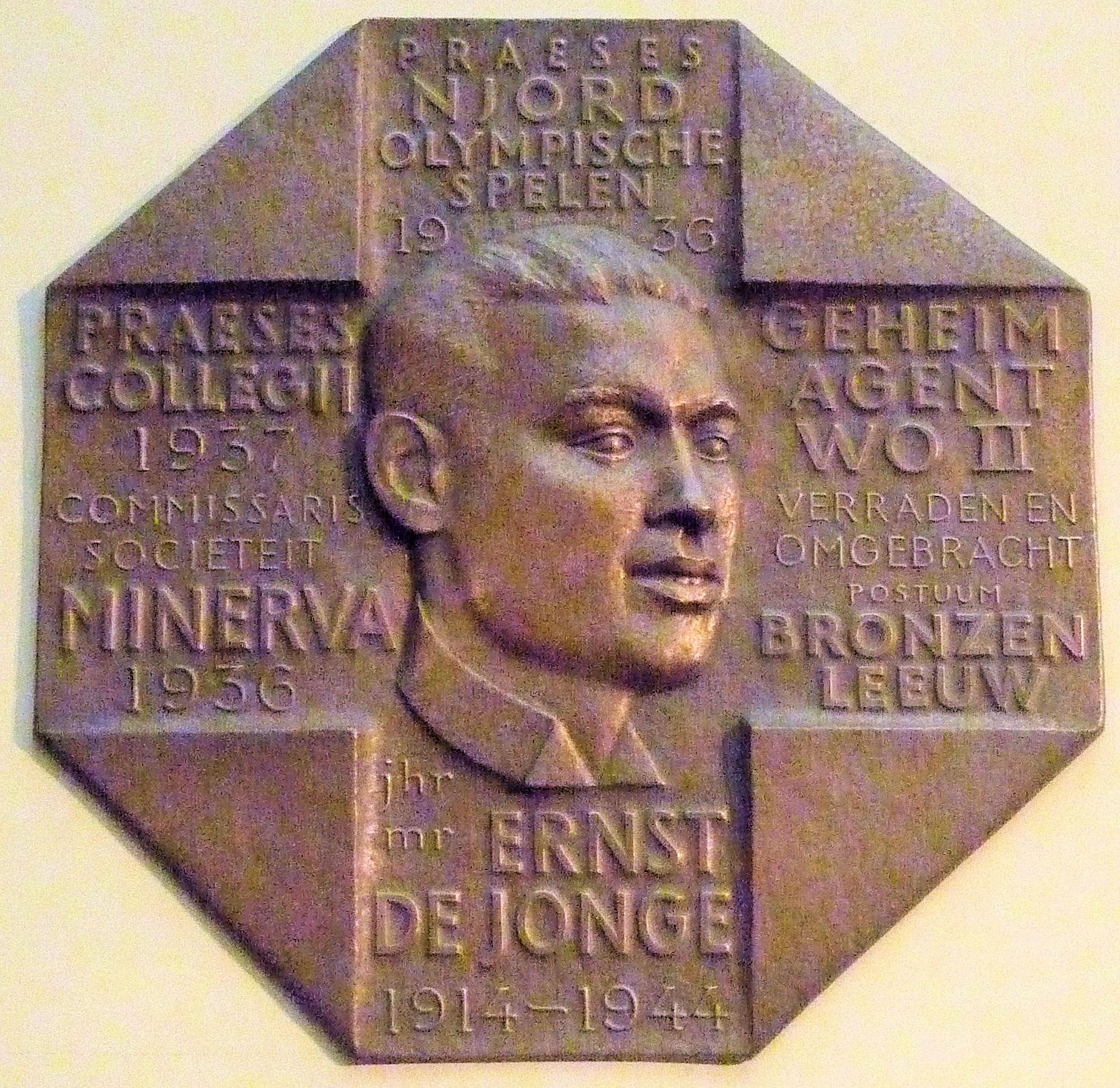
Plaque at the Leiden Student Union 'Minerva' commemorating their former president, Ernst de Jonge

On the four panels of the plaque are inscribed the following:

Praeses Njord, Olympische Spelen 1936

Praeses Collegii 1937, Commissaris Sociëteit Minerva 1936
Geheim Agent WO II, verraden en omgebracht, postuum Bronzen Leeuw
Jhr mr Ernst de Jonge 1914–1944

(President Njord Rowing Club, Olympic Games 1936)
(Student Body President 1937, President Minerva Society 1936)
(Secret Agent WW II, betrayed and murdered, posthumous Bronze Lion)
(Jhunker Mr. Ernst de Jonge 1914–1944)

== Honours ==
- Netherlands: Bronzen Leeuw (Bronze Lion) 14 December 1949
- Netherlands: Verzetsherdenkingskruis (Resistance Memorial Cross)
