= Adolf Laudon =

Austrian footballer (1912–1984)

Personal information
- Full name: Adolf Laudon
- Date of birth: 13 December 1912
- Date of death: 22 November 1984 (aged 71)
- Position: Striker

Senior career*
Years	Team	Apps	(Gls)
–1932	SK Admira Wien		
1932–1936	Salzburger AK 1914		
1936–1938	First Vienna FC		

International career
1932–1936	Austria (Amateurs)	6	
- * Club domestic league appearances and goals

Olympic medal record

Men's Football
Silver medal – second place	1936 Berlin	Team competition

Adolf Laudon (13 December 1912 – 22 November 1984) was an Austrian association football player who competed in the 1936 Summer Olympics. He was part of the Austrian team, which won the silver medal in the football tournament. He played all four matches as forward and scored one goal.
