= Franz Fuchsberger =

Austrian footballer (1910–1992)

Personal information
- Full name: Franz Fuchsberger
- Date of birth: 28 September 1910
- Date of death: 27 October 1992 (aged 82)
- Position: Striker

Senior career*
Years	Team	Apps	(Gls)
- SV Urfahr Linz

International career
1936	Austria	1	(0)
- * Club domestic league appearances and goals

Olympic medal record

Men's Football
Silver medal – second place	1936 Berlin	Team competition

Franz Fuchsberger (28 September 1910 – 27 October 1992) was an Austrian footballer who competed in the 1936 Summer Olympics.

== International career ==
He was part of the Austria team, which won the silver medal in the football tournament. He played all four matches as forward. He played one match for the Austria national football team, in September 1936 against Hungary.
