= Stadion am Gesundbrunnen =

Stadium in Berlin, Germany

Coordinates: 52°33′00″N 13°23′36″E

- Plumpe
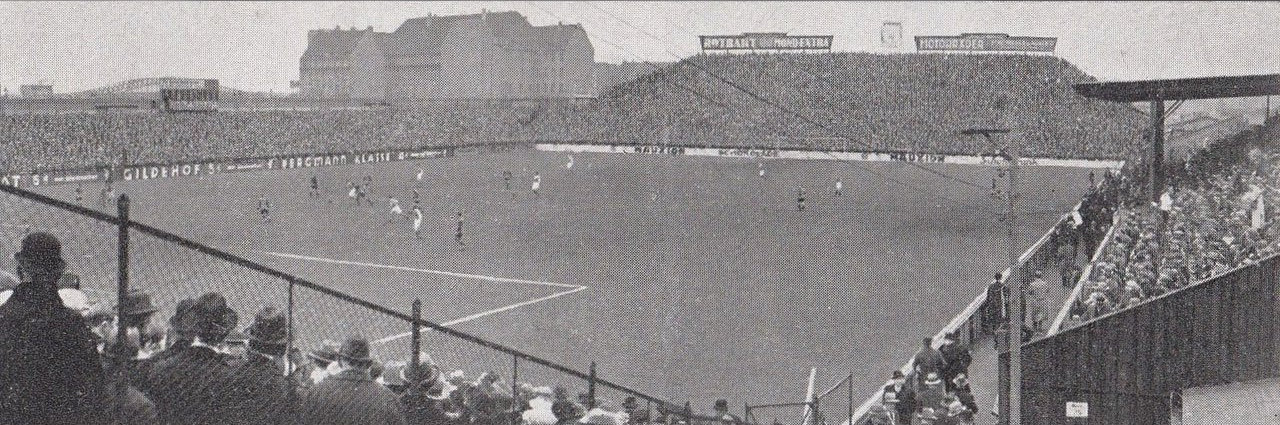
- Interactive map of Stadion am Gesundbrunnen
- Full name: Stadion am Gesundbrunnen
- Former names: Hertha-BSC Field
- Location: Berlin, Germany
- Owner: Hertha BSC
- Operator: Hertha BSC
- Capacity: 35,239

Construction
- Opened: 1924
- Closed: 1974

Tenant
- Hertha BSC

Stadion am Gesundbrunnen, known as Plumpe, was a multi-use stadium in the Gesundbrunnen locality of Berlin, Germany. It was initially used as the stadium of Hertha BSC matches. During the 1936 Summer Olympics, it hosted some of the football matches. The capacity of the stadium was 35,239 spectators.

When Hertha joined the Bundesliga in 1963, the club moved to the Olympic Stadium as the Plumpe stadium did not meet Bundesliga standards. In 1974 the club sold the ground to avoid bankruptcy, and it was demolished to make way for an apartment complex.
