= Elko Mrduljaš =

Yugoslav rower

Personal information
- Born: 25 September 1909 Split, Austria-Hungary
- Died: 28 July 1991 (aged 81) Split, Croatia

Sport
- Sport: Rowing
- Club: HVK Gusar
Medal record
Men's rowing
Representing Yugoslavia
European Rowing Championships
| Gold medal – first place | 1932 Belgrade | Eight |
| Bronze medal – third place | 1934 Lucerne | Coxed four |

Elko Mrduljaš (25 September 1909 – 28 July 1991) was a Yugoslav rower. He competed at the 1936 Summer Olympics in Berlin with the men's coxed pair where they came sixth.
