= Marsilio Rossi =

Italian sprinter

Personal information
- Nationality: Italian
- Born: 3 August 1916 Rio de Janeiro, Brazil
- Died: 16 December 1942 (aged 26) Filonovo, Soviet Union

Sport
- Sport: Sprinting
- Event: 4 × 400 metres relay

Marsilio Rossi (3 August 1916 – 16 December 1942) was an Italian sprinter. He competed in the men's 4 × 400 metres relay at the 1936 Summer Olympics. He was killed in action during World War II.
