= Karl Wahlmüller =

Austrian footballer (1913–1944)

Olympic medal record

Men's Football
Silver medal – second place	1936 Berlin	Team competition

Karl Wahlmüller (22 October 1913 in Linz – 16 February 1944 in Toila, Soviet Union) was an Austrian footballer who competed in the 1936 Summer Olympics. He was part of the Austria national team, which won the silver medal in the football tournament. He played all four matches as midfielder.

He played for SV Urfahr Linz at the time of his Olympic appearance and latterly for LSV Adlerhorst Weis before his death.

He was killed in action serving as corporal in a Luftwaffe field unit on the Eastern Front in 1944 aged 30.
