= George Loveless (rowing) =

American rower

Personal information
- Born: October 15, 1909 Pittsfield, Massachusetts, United States
- Died: November 2, 1968 (aged 59) Cromwell, Connecticut, United States

Sport
- Sport: Rowing

George Loveless (October 15, 1909 – November 2, 1968) was an American rower. He competed in the men's coxed pair event at the 1936 Summer Olympics.
