= Francesco Gabriotti =

Italian footballer

Personal information
- Date of birth: 12 August 1914
- Place of birth: Rome, Italy
- Date of death: 11 February 1987 (aged 72)
- Position: Forward

Senior career*
Years	Team	Apps	(Gls)
1932–1936	Lazio	27	(6)

International career
1936	Italy	1	(0)
Medal record
Representing Italy
Summer Olympics
Gold medal – first place	Summer Olympics	1936 Berlin
- * Club domestic league appearances and goals

Francesco Gabriotti (Italian pronunciation: [franˈtʃesko ɡabriˈɔtti]; 12 August 1914 – 11 February 1987) was an Italian association footballer who played as a forward and who competed in the 1936 Summer Olympics. He was a member of the Italian team, which won the gold medal in the football tournament.

== Honours ==
=== International ===
Italy

- Olympic Gold Medal: 1936
