= Pavao Ljubičić =

Croatian rower

Personal information
- Nationality: Croatian
- Born: 4 July 1918; Šibenik, Austria-Hungary
- Died: 1 June 1944 (aged 25); Zadar, Italy

Sport
- Sport: Rowing

Pavao Ljubičić (4 July 1918 – 1 June 1944) was a Croatian rower. He competed in three events at the 1936 Summer Olympics.
