= Franz Mandl (footballer) =

Austrian footballer

Olympic medal record

Men's Football
Silver medal – second place	1936 Berlin	Team competition

Franz Mandl (4 August 1916 in Vienna – 4 February 1988) was an Austrian football (soccer) player who competed in the 1936 Summer Olympics. He was part of the Austrian team, which won the silver medal in the football tournament. He played one match as forward and scored one goal.
