= Alfonso Negro =

American-born Italian association football player (1915-1984)

Personal information
- Date of birth: 27 June 1915
- Place of birth: Brooklyn, New York, United States
- Date of death: 7 November 1984 (aged 69)
- Place of death: Florence, Italy
- Position: Forward

Senior career*
Years	Team	Apps	(Gls)
1930–1933	Angri	?	(?)
1933–1934	Catanzaro	23	(6)
1934–1938	Fiorentina	52	(5)
1938–1941	Napoli	25	(3)
1942–1952	Ercolanese	?	(?)

International career
1936	Italy	1	(1)
Medal record
Representing Italy
Summer Olympics
Gold medal – first place	Summer Olympics	1936 Berlin
- * Club domestic league appearances and goals

Alfonso Negro (Italian pronunciation: [alˈfɔnso ˈneːɡro]; 5 July 1915 – 7 November 1984) was an American-born Italian football (soccer) player, who played as a forward; he is believed to be the first American-born player in Serie A and the first American-born player to have played for Italy.

== Club career ==
Born in Brooklyn, New York, Negro started his career with Angri in Serie C at the age of 15. He moved on to Catanzarese in Serie B. While at Catanzarese, he made his international debut with Italy B team against Hungary in Vercelli.

In 1934, he transferred to Fiorentina in Serie A. In that era, three other American-born players -- Armando Frigo, Alfio Argentieri and Umberto Piccolo—played in Italy at that time, but only Armando Frigo played in the Serie A. Alfonso Negro played 51 games for Fiorentina and scored five goals, before being transferred to Napoli in 1938, where he played 25 games and scored three goals.

== International career ==
Negro was selected to play for Italy at the 1936 Olympic Games. He scored a goal against Norway and went on to win a gold medal in the tournament.

== Education ==
Negro also entered university, where he played for his school team. He graduated in medicine and surgery at Florence University and during the war served as a medical officer in Greece. Following the war, he became a specialist in obstetrics and gynaecology and became a lecturer. He died in Florence, Italy on 7 November 1984.

== Honours ==
=== International ===
Italy

- Olympic Gold Medal: 1936

== Sources ==
- "Americans in Italy at National Soccer Hall of Fame". Archived from the original on 6 January 2009.
- "Alfonso Negro at databaseOlympics.com". Archived from the original on 8 March 2007.
- "US Players in Italy". RSSSF.
