= Orestes Jordán =

Peruvian footballer (1913-1991)

Personal information
- Full name: Orestes Jordán Cánepa
- Date of birth: 21 November 1913
- Place of birth: Chincha Alta, Peru
- Date of death: 4 December 1991 (aged 78)
- Place of death: Lima, Peru

Senior career*
Years	Team	Apps	(Gls)
- Universitario
- * Club domestic league appearances and goals

Orestes Jordán Cánepa (21 November 1913 – 4 December 1991) was a Peruvian international football player. He was born in Chincha Alta. He participated with the Peru national football team at the 1936 Summer Olympics in Berlin.
