= Sergio Bertoni =

Italian footballer (1915–1995)

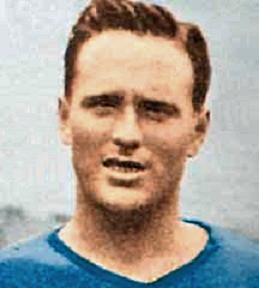

Personal information
- Date of birth: 23 September 1915
- Place of birth: Pisa, Italy
- Date of death: 15 February 1995 (aged 79)
- Place of death: La Spezia, Italy
- Position: Forward

Senior career*
Years	Team	Apps	(Gls)
1935–1938	Pisa	199	(41)
1938–1946	Genoa	135	(23)
1946–1947	Brescia	33	(6)
1947–1949	Modena	58	(7)
1949–1950	Spezia	25	(0)
Total		450	(77)

International career
1936–1940	Italy	6	(1)

Managerial career
- 1950–1951: Spezia
- 1955–1957: Spezia
- 1960–1961: Spezia
Medal record
Italy
FIFA World Cup
Winner	1938 France
Summer Olympics
Gold medal – first place	1936 Berlin
- * Club domestic league appearances and goals

Sergio Bertoni (Italian pronunciation: [ˈsɛrdʒo berˈtoːni]; 23 September 1915 – 15 February 1995) was an Italian association football manager and player, who played as a striker. With the Italy national team, he won the 1936 Summer Olympics football tournament and the 1938 FIFA World Cup.

== Club career ==
Born in Pisa, Bertoni played for Pisa Calcio (1935–1938) and Genoa C.F.C. (1938–1946) throughout his club career.

== International career ==
Bertoni obtained six international caps with the Italy national team between 1936 and 1940, and scored one goal. He won the gold medal at the 1936 Summer Olympics and the 1938 FIFA World Cup: with Alfredo Foni, Pietro Rava and Ugo Locatelli, he is one of the only four Italian players to have won both tournaments.

== Managerial career and later life ==
After World War II, Bertoni coached Spezia Calcio 1906 in the 1950–51, 1955–56, 1956–57 and 1961–62 seasons. He died at 79 years old.

== Honours ==
Italy

- Olympic Gold Medal: 1936
- FIFA World Cup: 1938
