= Ernst Künz =

Austrian footballer (1912–1944)

Olympic medal record

Men's Football
Silver medal – second place	1936 Berlin	Team competition

Ernst Künz (23 February 1912 – 21 August 1944) was an Austrian football (soccer) player who competed in the 1936 Summer Olympics.

He was part of the Austrian team, which won the silver medal in the football tournament. He played all four matches as defender. He died in World War II when killed in action, aged 32, in Lithuania.
