= Taro Teshima =

Japanese rower

Personal information
- Nationality: Japanese
- Born: 14 July 1912

Sport
- Sport: Rowing

Taro Teshima (born 14 July 1912, date of death unknown) was a Japanese rower. He competed in two events at the 1936 Summer Olympics.
