= Giuseppe Baldo =

Italian footballer

Personal information
- Date of birth: 27 July 1914
- Place of birth: Piombino Dese, Italy
- Date of death: 31 July 2007 (aged 93)
- Place of death: Montecatini Terme, Italy
- Position: Midfielder

Senior career*
Years	Team	Apps	(Gls)
1932–1935	Padova	69	(3)
1935–1942	Lazio	169	(8)

International career
1936	Italy	4	(0)
Medal record
Representing Italy
Summer Olympics
Gold medal – first place	Summer Olympics	1936 Berlin
- * Club domestic league appearances and goals

Giuseppe Baldo (Italian pronunciation: [dʒuˈzɛppe ˈbaldo]; 27 July 1914 – 31 July 2007) was an Italian footballer who played as a midfielder and who competed in the 1936 Summer Olympics.

== Career ==
Born in Piombino Dese, Baldo began his football career with local side Calcio Padova before moving to Rome to play for S.S. Lazio in 1935. Baldo was a member of the Italian Olympic team which won the gold medal in the 1936 Olympic football tournament.

== Honours ==
=== International ===
Italy

- Olympic Gold Medal: 1936
