= John Dodds (footballer) =

Scottish footballer

Personal information
- Full name: John McDonald Dodds
- Date of birth: 10 January 1907
- Place of birth: Cathcart, Scotland
- Date of death: 1982 (aged 74–75)
- Place of death: Newton Mearns, Scotland
- Position: Centre forward

Senior career*
Years	Team	Apps	(Gls)
1928–1937	Queen's Park	191	(120)

International career
1930–1936	Scotland Amateurs	8	(9)
1936	Great Britain	1	(1)
- * Club domestic league appearances and goals

John McDonald Dodds (10 January 1907 – 1982) was a Scottish amateur footballer who represented Great Britain at the 1936 Summer Olympics. Dodds played as a centre forward in the Scottish League for Queen's Park and represented Scotland at amateur level.
