= Bruno Venturini =

Italian footballer (1911–1991)

Personal information
- Date of birth: 26 September 1911
- Place of birth: Carrara, Italy
- Date of death: 7 March 1991 (aged 79)
- Place of death: Lecce, Italy
- Position: Goalkeeper

Senior career*
Years	Team	Apps	(Gls)
1927–1931	Carrarese	50	(0)
1931–1932	Fiorentina	1	(0)
1932–1933	Fiorentina II	26	(0)
1933–1934	Lucchese	31	(0)
1934–1940	Sampierdarenese	75	(0)
1940–1941	Spezia	9	(0)
1941–1943	A.C. Liguria	16	(0)

International career
1936	Italy	4	(0)
Medal record
Representing Italy
Summer Olympics
Gold medal – first place	Summer Olympics	1936 Berlin
- * Club domestic league appearances and goals

Bruno Venturini (Italian pronunciation: [ˈbruːno ventuˈriːni]; 26 September 1911 – 7 March 1991) was an Italian footballer who played as a goalkeeper, and who competed with Italy in the 1936 Summer Olympics in Berlin.

== Career ==
Born in Carrara, Venturini began playing football as a goalkeeper for local side Carrarese Calcio. He later played in Serie A for ACF Fiorentina, Sampierdarenese and A.C. Liguria. He also played in Serie B for Spezia Calcio 1906. Venturini was a member of the Italian Olympic team, which won the gold medal in the 1936 Olympic football tournament.

== Death ==
Venturini died at the age of 79 on 7 March 1991 in Lecce.

== Honours ==
=== International ===
Italy

- Olympic Gold Medal: 1936
