= Libero Marchini =

Italian footballer

Personal information
- Date of birth: 31 October 1914
- Place of birth: Castelnuovo Magra, Italy
- Date of death: 1 November 2003 (aged 89)
- Place of death: Trieste, Italy
- Position: Midfielder

Senior career*
Years	Team	Apps	(Gls)
1931–1933	Carrarese	50	(16)
1933–1934	Fiorentina	10	(3)
1934–1935	Genoa	16	(5)
1935–1937	Lucchese	64	(8)
1937–1939	Lazio	16	(05)
1939–1940	Torino	18	(1)
1941–1943	Carrarese	19	(2)

International career
1936	Italy	5	(0)
Medal record
Representing Italy
Summer Olympics
Gold medal – first place	Summer Olympics	1936 Berlin
- * Club domestic league appearances and goals

Libero Marchini (Italian pronunciation: [ˈliːbero marˈkiːni]; 31 October 1914 – 1 November 2003) was an Italian footballer who played as a midfielder, and who competed in the 1936 Summer Olympics. He was a member of the Italian team, which won the gold medal in the football tournament.

== Honours ==
=== Club ===
Genoa

- Serie B: 1934–35

Lucchese

- Serie B: 1935–36

=== International ===
Italy

- Olympic Gold Medal: 1936
