= Achille Piccini =

Italian footballer (1911–1995)

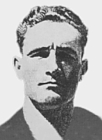

Personal information
- Date of birth: 24 October 1911
- Place of birth: Carrara, Italy
- Date of death: 13 September 1995 (aged 83)
- Place of death: Carrara, Italy
- Position: Defender

Senior career*
Years	Team	Apps	(Gls)
1928–1933	Carrarese	133	(10)
1933–1934	A.C. Prato	28	(1)
1934–1938	Fiorentina	48	(1)
1938–1939	Napoli	24	(1)
1939–1940	Lucchese	25	(1)
1940–1941	Bari	11	(0)
1941–1944	Carrarese	?	(?)
1941–1944	Anconitana	11	(0)

International career
1936	Italy	5	(0)
Medal record
Representing Italy
Summer Olympics
Gold medal – first place	Summer Olympics	1936 Berlin
- * Club domestic league appearances and goals

Achille Piccini (Italian pronunciation: [aˈkille pitˈtʃiːni]; 24 October 1911 – 13 September 1995) was an Italian footballer who competed in the 1936 Summer Olympics. A native of Carrara, Piccini played as a midfielder or as a defender.

== Career ==
Piccini played for several Italian clubs throughout his career, including Fiorentina, Carrarese, Bari and Napoli. Piccini was also a member of the Italian team which won the gold medal in the football tournament of the 1936 Summer Olympics held in Berlin.

== Honours ==
=== International ===
Italy

- Olympic Gold Medal: 1936
