= Guido Santin =

Italian rower

Personal information
- Born: 1 January 1911 Treporti
- Died: 1 August 2008 (aged 97) Treporti

Sport
- Sport: Rowing
Medal record
Men's rowing
Representing Italy
Olympic Games
Silver medal – second place	1936 Berlin	Coxed pair
European Rowing Championships
Gold medal – first place	1935 Berlin	Coxed pair
Silver medal – second place	1937 Amsterdam	Coxed pair
Gold medal – first place	1938 Milan	Coxed pair

Guido Santin (1 January 1911 – 1 August 2008) was an Italian rower who competed in the 1936 Summer Olympics.

He was born and died in Cavallino-Treporti.

In 1936 he won the silver medal as crew member of the Italian boat in the coxed pair event.
