= Martin Kargl =

Austrian footballer (1912–1946)

Olympic medal record

Men's Football
Silver medal – second place	1936 Berlin	Team competition

Martin Kargl (30 December 1912 – 20 May 1946) was an Austrian football (soccer) player who competed in the 1936 Summer Olympics. He was part of the Austrian team, which won the silver medal in the football tournament. He played all four matches as defender.
