= Eduard Kainberger =

Austrian footballer (1911–1974)

Olympic medal record

Men's Football
Silver medal – second place	1936 Berlin	Team competition

Eduard "Edi" Kainberger (20 November 1911 – 7 March 1974) was an Austrian association football player who competed in the 1936 Summer Olympics. He was part of the Austrian team, which won the silver medal in the football tournament. He played all four matches as goalkeeper and captain.
