= Karl Kainberger =

Austrian footballer (1913–1997)

Olympic medal record

Men's Football
Silver medal – second place	1936 Berlin	Team competition

Karl Kainberger (1 December 1913 – 17 December 1997) was an Austrian football (soccer) player who competed in the 1936 Summer Olympics. Kainberger was born in Salzburg. He was part of the Austrian team, which won the silver medal in the football tournament. He played two matches as forward and scored two goals. He died in Salzburg.
