= Rowing at the 1956 Summer Olympics =

Rowing at the Games of the XVI Olympiad
- Venue: Lake Wendouree
- Dates: 23–27 November 1956
- Competitors: 242 from 25 nations

Rowing at the 1956 Summer Olympics featured seven events, for men only. The competitions were held from 23 to 27 November on Lake Wendouree, Ballarat, Australia.

== Medal summary ==
| Games | Gold | Silver | Bronze |
|---|---|---|---|
| single sculls | Vyacheslav Ivanov; Soviet Union | Stuart Mackenzie; Australia | John B. Kelly Jr. United States |
| double sculls | Aleksandr Berkutov and Yuriy Tyukalov; Soviet Union | Pat Costello and Jim Gardiner; United States | Murray Riley and Mervyn Wood; Australia |
| coxless pairs | James Fifer and Duvall Hecht; United States | Igor Buldakov and Viktor Ivanov; Soviet Union | Josef Kloimstein and Alfred Sageder; Austria |
| coxed pair | United States; Arthur Ayrault; Conn Findlay; Kurt Seiffert | United Team of Germany; Karl-Heinrich von Groddeck; Horst Arndt; Rainer Borkowsky | Soviet Union; Ihor Yemchuk; Heorhiy Zhylin; Vladimir Petrov |
| coxless fours | Canada; Archibald MacKinnon; Lorne Loomer; Walter D'Hondt; Donald Arnold | United States; John Welchli; John McKinlay; Art McKinlay; James McIntosh | France; René Guissart; Yves Delacour; Gaston Mercier; Guy Guillabert |
| coxed fours | Italy; Alberto Winkler; Romano Sgheiz; Angelo Vanzin; Franco Trincavelli; Ivo Stefanoni | Sweden; Olle Larsson; Gösta Eriksson; Ivar Aronsson; Evert Gunnarsson; Bertil Göransson | Finland; Kauko Hänninen; Reino Poutanen; Veli Lehtelä; Toimi Pitkänen; Matti Niemi |
| eights | United States; Thomas Charlton; David Wight; John Cooke; Donald Beer; Caldwell Esselstyn; Charles Grimes; Rusty Wailes; Robert Morey; William Becklean | Canada; Philip Kueber; Richard McClure; Robert Wilson; David Helliwell; Wayne Pretty; Bill McKerlich; Douglas McDonald; Lawrence West; Carlton Ogawa | Australia; Michael Aikman; David Boykett; Fred Benfield; Jim Howden; Garth Manton; Walter Howell; Adrian Monger; Brian Doyle; Harold Hewitt |

== Participating nations ==
A total of 242 rowers from 25 nations competed at the Melbourne Games:

- Australia (26)
- Austria (4)
- Belgium (7)
- Brazil (5)
- Canada (13)
- Chile (3)
- Cuba (9)
- Czechoslovakia (11)
- Denmark (7)
- Finland (5)
- France (13)
- United Team of Germany (12)
- Great Britain (12)
- Greece (1)
- Hungary (4)
- Italy (21)
- Japan (9)
- Mexico (1)
- New Zealand (8)
- Poland (8)
- Soviet Union (25)
- Sweden (9)
- United States (26)
- Uruguay (2)
- Yugoslavia (1)

== Medal table ==
| Rank | Nation | Gold | Silver | Bronze | Total |
|---|---|---|---|---|---|
| 1 | United States | 3 | 2 | 1 | 6 |
| 2 | Soviet Union | 2 | 1 | 1 | 4 |
| 3 | Canada | 1 | 1 | 0 | 2 |
| 4 | Italy | 1 | 0 | 0 | 1 |
| 5 | Australia | 0 | 1 | 2 | 3 |
| 6 | Sweden | 0 | 1 | 0 | 1 |
| 6 | United Team of Germany | 0 | 1 | 0 | 1 |
| 8 | Austria | 0 | 0 | 1 | 1 |
| 8 | Finland | 0 | 0 | 1 | 1 |
| 8 | France | 0 | 0 | 1 | 1 |
| Totals (10 entries) | | 7 | 7 | 7 | 21 |
