= Rowing at the 1956 Summer Olympics – Men's eight =

Men's eight at the Games of the XVI Olympiad
- Rowing pictogram
- Venue: Lake Wendouree
- Dates: 23–27 November 1956
- Competitors: 90 from 10 nations
- Winning time: 6:35.2

Medalists
1st place, gold medalist(s)		United States: Thomas Charlton; David Wight; John Cooke; Donald Beer; Caldwell Esselstyn; Charles Grimes; Rusty Wailes; Robert Morey; William Becklean
2nd place, silver medalist(s)		Canada: Philip Kueber; Richard McClure; Robert Wilson; David Helliwell; Wayne Pretty; Bill McKerlich; Douglas McDonald; Lawrence West; Carlton Ogawa
3rd place, bronze medalist(s)		Australia: Michael Aikman; David Boykett; Fred Benfield; Jim Howden; Garth Manton; Walter Howell; Adrian Monger; Brian Doyle; Harold Hewitt

The men's eight competition at the 1956 Summer Olympics took place at Lake Wendouree near Ballarat, Australia. It was held from 23 to 27 November. There were 10 boats (90 competitors) from 10 nations, with each nation limited to a single boat in the event. The event was won by the United States, the nation's eighth consecutive and 10th overall gold medal in the men's eight; the Americans had won every time they competed (missing 1908 and 1912). Canada took silver, its first medal in the men's eight since 1932. Australia repeated as bronze medalists.

== Background ==
This was the 12th appearance of the event. Rowing had been on the programme in 1896 but was cancelled due to bad weather. The men's eight has been held every time that rowing has been contested, beginning in 1900.

The United States was the dominant nation in the event, with the nation winning the previous seven Olympic men's eight competitions (as well as the other two competitions which the United States had entered). Potential challengers included the Soviet Union (1952 Olympic silver medalists and European champions in 1953, 1954, and 1955), Czechoslovakia (1956 European champions), and Canada (1954 British Empire and Commonwealth champions).

For the first time, no nations made their debut in the event. Canada, Great Britain, and the United States each made their 10th appearance, tied for most among nations to that point.

== Competition format ==
The "eight" event featured nine-person boats, with eight rowers and a coxswain. It was a sweep rowing event, with the rowers each having one oar (and thus each rowing on one side). The course used the 2000 metres distance that became the Olympic standard in 1912 (with the exception of 1948).

The 1952 competition featured four rounds: three main rounds (quarterfinals, semifinals, and a final) as well as a repechage after the quarterfinals.

- The 10 boats were divided into 3 heats of 3 or 4 boats each for the quarterfinals. The winner and 2nd place boats in each heat (6 total) advanced directly to the semifinals, while the remaining boats (4 total) went to the repechage.
- The repechage had 4 boats in a single heat. The top 2 boats rejoined the quarterfinal winners in the semifinals, while the bottom 2 boats were eliminated.
- The semifinals placed the 8 boats in 2 heats, with 4 boats per heat. The winner and runner-up of each heat (4 boats total) advanced to the final, while the other boats (4 total) were eliminated.
- The final round consisted of a single final for the medals and 4th place.

== Schedule ==
All times are Australian Eastern Standard Time (UTC+10)

Date	Time	Round
Friday, 23 November 1956	16:00	Quarterfinals
Saturday, 24 November 1956	17:30	Repechage
Monday, 26 November 1956	15:30	Semifinals
Tuesday, 27 November 1956	17:30	Final

== Results ==
=== Quarterfinals ===
==== Quarterfinal 1 ====
All three eventual medalists came from this heat. The heavily favored United States surprisingly finished third, possibly trying to conserve strength for later rounds; this sent the Americans to the repechage.

Rank	Rowers	Coxswain	Nation	Time	Notes
1	Michael Aikman; David Boykett; Fred Benfield; Jim Howden; Garth Manton; Walter Howell; Adrian Monger; Brian Doyle	Harold Hewitt	Australia	6:05.8	Q
2	Philip Kueber; Richard McClure; Robert Wilson; David Helliwell; Wayne Pretty; Bill McKerlich; Douglas McDonald; Lawrence West	Carlton Ogawa	Canada	6:07.1	Q
3	Thomas Charlton; David Wight; John Cooke; Donald Beer; Caldwell Esselstyn; Charles Grimes; Rusty Wailes; Robert Morey	William Becklean	United States	6:09.1	R
4	Richard Wheadon; Michael Delahooke; Ian Welsh; Kenneth Masser; Simon Tozer; Alan Watson; John A. Russell; Christopher Davidge	John Hinde	Great Britain	6:23.9	R

==== Quarterfinal 2 ====
Rank	Rowers	Coxswain	Nation	Time	Notes
1	Josef Věntus; Eduard Antoch; Ctibor Reiskup; Jan Švéda; Josef Švec; Zdeněk Žára; Jan Jindra; Stanislav Lusk	Miroslav Koranda	Czechoslovakia	6:09.3	Q
2	Yozo Iwasaki; Yasukuni Watanabe; Sadahiro Sunaga; Yoshiki Hiki; Takashi Imamura; Yasuhiko Takeda; Masao Hara; Junichi Kato	Toshiji Eda	Japan	6:11.8	Q
3	Santé Marcuzzi; Émile Clerc; Richard Duc; Maurice Bas; Édouard Leguery; Jean-Jacques Vignon; Maurice Houdayer; René Massiasse	Jacques Vilcoq	France	6:13.0	R

==== Quarterfinal 3 ====
Rank	Rowers	Coxswain	Nation	Time	Notes
1	Olle Larsson; Lennart Andersson; Kjell Hansson; Rune Andersson; Lennart Hansson; Gösta Eriksson; Ivar Aronsson; Evert Gunnarsson	Bertil Göransson	Sweden	6:06.4	Q
2	Ernest Verbin; Boris Fyodorov; Slava Amiragov; Leonid Gissen; Yevgeny Samsonov; Anatoly Antonov; Georgy Gushchenko; Vladimir Kryukov	Vladimir Petrov	Soviet Union	6:06.5	Q
3	Antonio Amato; Salvatore Nuvoli; Cosimo Campioto; Livio Tesconi; Antonio Casoar; Gian Carlo Casalini; Sergio Tagliapietra; Arrigo Menicocci	Vincenzo Rubolotta	Italy	6:09.5	R

=== Repechage ===
The United States won easily. Great Britain and France were eliminated.

Rank	Rowers	Coxswain	Nation	Time	Notes
1	Thomas Charlton; David Wight; John Cooke; Donald Beer; Caldwell Esselstyn; Charles Grimes; Rusty Wailes; Robert Morey	William Becklean	United States	7:09.9	Q
2	Antonio Amato; Salvatore Nuvoli; Cosimo Campioto; Livio Tesconi; Antonio Casoar; Gian Carlo Casalini; Sergio Tagliapietra; Arrigo Menicocci	Vincenzo Rubolotta	Italy	7:17.4	Q
3	Richard Wheadon; Michael Delahooke; Ian Welsh; Kenneth Masser; Simon Tozer; Alan Watson; John A. Russell; Christopher Davidge	John Hinde	Great Britain	7:18.1	
4	Santé Marcuzzi; Émile Clerc; Richard Duc; Maurice Bas; Édouard Leguery; Jean-Jacques Vignon; Maurice Houdayer; René Massiasse	Jacques Vilcoq	France	Unknown	

=== Semifinals ===
==== Semifinal 1 ====
In a rematch of the quarterfinals, this time the United States came out on top of Australia, though the race was close. The other two boats in this semifinal, the Soviet Union and Japan, were both well behind the leaders and were eliminated.

Rank	Rowers	Coxswain	Nation	Time	Notes
1	Thomas Charlton; David Wight; John Cooke; Donald Beer; Caldwell Esselstyn; Charles Grimes; Rusty Wailes; Robert Morey	William Becklean	United States	6:55.1	Q
2	Michael Aikman; David Boykett; Fred Benfield; Jim Howden; Garth Manton; Walter Howell; Adrian Monger; Brian Doyle	Harold Hewitt	Australia	6:55.6	Q
3	Ernest Verbin; Boris Fyodorov; Slava Amiragov; Leonid Gissen; Yevgeny Samsonov; Anatoly Antonov; Georgy Gushchenko; Vladimir Kryukov	Vladimir Petrov	Soviet Union	7:18.3	
4	Yozo Iwasaki; Yasukuni Watanabe; Sadahiro Sunaga; Yoshiki Hiki; Takashi Imamura; Yasuhiko Takeda; Masao Hara; Junichi Kato	Toshiji Eda	Japan	7:24.5	

==== Semifinal 2 ====
Canada had little difficulty advancing. Sweden took second place to earn the last spot in the final.

Rank	Rowers	Coxswain	Nation	Time	Notes
1	Philip Kueber; Richard McClure; Robert Wilson; David Helliwell; Wayne Pretty; Bill McKerlich; Douglas McDonald; Lawrence West	Carlton Ogawa	Canada	6:57.0	Q
2	Olle Larsson; Lennart Andersson; Kjell Hansson; Rune Andersson; Lennart Hansson; Gösta Eriksson; Ivar Aronsson; Evert Gunnarsson	Bertil Göransson	Sweden	7:08.4	Q
3	Josef Věntus; Eduard Antoch; Ctibor Reiskup; Jan Švéda; Josef Švec; Zdeněk Žára; Jan Jindra; Stanislav Lusk	Miroslav Koranda	Czechoslovakia	7:12.9	
4	Antonio Amato; Salvatore Nuvoli; Cosimo Campioto; Livio Tesconi; Antonio Casoar; Gian Carlo Casalini; Sergio Tagliapietra; Arrigo Menicocci	Vincenzo Rubolotta	Italy	7:19.8	

=== Final ===
The start of the race looked as if it might be a replay of the first quarterfinal, with Australia and Canada battling for the lead and the United States in third, with a fourth boat (Sweden this time, rather than Great Britain) well behind. Canada took a clear lead just before the halfway mark. The United States, however, finally pulled ahead in the latter half and were able to hold off Canada. Australia kept close for most of the way but tired at the end.

Rank	Rowers	Coxswain	Nation	Time
1st place, gold medalist(s)	Thomas Charlton; David Wight; John Cooke; Donald Beer; Caldwell Esselstyn; Charles Grimes; Rusty Wailes; Robert Morey	William Becklean	United States	6:35,2
2nd place, silver medalist(s)	Philip Kueber; Richard McClure; Robert Wilson; David Helliwell; Wayne Pretty; Bill McKerlich; Douglas McDonald; Lawrence West	Carlton Ogawa	Canada	6:37,1
3rd place, bronze medalist(s)	Michael Aikman; David Boykett; Fred Benfield; Jim Howden; Garth Manton; Walter Howell; Adrian Monger; Brian Doyle	Harold Hewitt	Australia	6:39,2
4	Olle Larsson; Lennart Andersson; Kjell Hansson; Rune Andersson; Lennart Hansson; Gösta Eriksson; Ivar Aronsson; Evert Gunnarsson	Bertil Göransson	Sweden	6:48,1

== Results summary ==
The following rowers took part:

Rank	Rowers	Coxswain	Nation
1st place, gold medalist(s)	Thomas Charlton; David Wight; John Cooke; Donald Beer; Caldwell Esselstyn; Charles Grimes; Rusty Wailes; Robert Morey	William Becklean	United States
2nd place, silver medalist(s)	Philip Kueber; Richard McClure; Robert Wilson; David Helliwell; Wayne Pretty; Bill McKerlich; Douglas McDonald; Lawrence West	Carlton Ogawa	Canada
3rd place, bronze medalist(s)	Michael Aikman; David Boykett; Fred Benfield; Jim Howden; Garth Manton; Walter Howell; Adrian Monger; Brian Doyle	Harold Hewitt	Australia
	Olle Larsson; Lennart Andersson; Kjell Hansson; Rune Andersson; Lennart Hansson; Gösta Eriksson; Ivar Aronsson; Evert Gunnarsson	Bertil Göransson	Sweden
	Ernest Verbin; Boris Fyodorov; Slava Amiragov; Leonid Gissen; Yevgeny Samsonov; Anatoly Antonov; Georgy Gushchenko; Vladimir Kryukov	Vladimir Petrov	Soviet Union
	Josef Věntus; Eduard Antoch; Ctibor Reiskup; Jan Švéda; Josef Švec; Zdeněk Žára; Jan Jindra; Stanislav Lusk	Miroslav Koranda	Czechoslovakia
	Yozo Iwasaki; Yasukuni Watanabe; Sadahiro Sunaga; Yoshiki Hiki; Takashi Imamura; Yasuhiko Takeda; Masao Hara; Junichi Kato	Toshiji Eda	Japan
	Antonio Amato; Salvatore Nuvoli; Cosimo Campioto; Livio Tesconi; Antonio Casoar; Gian Carlo Casalini; Sergio Tagliapietra; Arrigo Menicocci	Vincenzo Rubolotta	Italy
	Richard Wheadon; Michael Delahooke; Ian Welsh; Kenneth Masser; Simon Tozer; Alan Watson; John A. Russell; Christopher Davidge	John Hinde	Great Britain
	Santé Marcuzzi; Émile Clerc; Richard Duc; Maurice Bas; Édouard Leguery; Jean-Jacques Vignon; Maurice Houdayer; René Massiasse	Jacques Vilcoq	France
