= Vancouver Rowing Club =

- Location: Stanley Park, Vancouver, British Columbia, Canada
- Founded: 1886
- Former names: Vancouver Boating Club
- Affiliations: Rowing Canada
- Website: www.vancouverrowingclub.ca

Vancouver Rowing Club (VRC) is a rowing club in Vancouver, British Columbia, Canada. Originally formed in 1886 as the Vancouver Boating Club, the first clubhouse was built a year later. In 1890 one of the city's early athletic rivalries began when the Burrard Inlet Rowing Club built its headquarters just west of the Boating Club. Coal Harbour became the scene of many colourful rowing regattas. On April 1, 1899, the two rival clubs amalgamated to form the Vancouver Rowing Club. The present heritage building in Stanley Park was officially opened September 9, 1911.

The Vancouver Rowing Club membership is separated into two categories. Active Members are those who are associated with one of the sporting sections (Rowing, Rugby, Yachting or Field Hockey) of the club. Social Members are not directly associated with any of the sections and are not entitled to vote at club meetings.

== Rowing ==
The club offers rowing to a variety of groups, Juniors, Open, Masters, Adaptive, Novice, Recreational and Corporate. Popular "Learn to Row" courses on Coal Harbour play an important role in the development of rowing in Vancouver.

The Vancouver Rowing Club currently has a fleet of 4 eights, 10 four-person boats (quads & fours), 11 two-person boats (primarily doubles but also pairs) and 5 singles.

=== Canadian Olympic Hall of Fame ===
- 1958 induction - Don Arnold, Lorne Loomer, Archibald MacKinnon, Ignace Walter D'Hont, Carl Ogawa, Richard Neil McClure, Phillip Keuber, Douglas McDonald, and Bill McKerlich as Athletes
- 1971 induction - George Hungerford and Roger Jackson as Athletes
- 1974 induction - Frank Read as a Builder
- 1994 induction - Derek Porter as an Athlete

=== BC Sports Hall of Fame ===
- 1966 induction - 1954 UBC/VRC Eights (Men) and 1956 UBC/VCR Coxless Fours (Men) as a Team and George Hungerford as an Athlete.
- 1976 induction - 1956 UBC/VCR Eights (Men) as a Team.
- 1977 induction - 1924 VRC Coxless Fours (Men) and 1960 UBC/VCR Eights (Men) were inducted as a Team.
- 1980 induction - 1932 VRC Double Sculls (Men) was inducted as a Team.
- 1996 induction - Frank Read was inducted as a Builder and Derek Porter as an Athlete.

=== 1954 Commonwealth Games and Frank Read ===
In the West, the Vancouver Rowing Club had experience and facilities but lacked athletes to compete, while the University of British Columbia had athletes but had no rowing traditions. When Vancouver was chosen to host the 5th British Empire and Commonwealth Games in 1954, the two forces merged. From this joint venture came the UBC/VRC crews.

Local rowing supporters persuaded a hotel owner, Frank Read, to coach the new joint-venture crews. He was a gruff individual, known for refusing to mince his words or guard his comments. But he could coach and bring out the best in his athletes. While some people cringed at his public expressions, his athletes and the rowing community revered him.

Read started on an arduous training program that covered hundreds of miles over the choppy driftwood-strewn waters of Coal Harbour. His intensive program, often leading as far as the Second Narrows Bridge in all kinds of weather, morning and evening, soon began to produce results.

The first to suffer the consequences of Read's training programs were the crews from the universities of Oregon and Washington. To their horror and surprise an unknown force had appeared on the West Coast and soon began to threaten and then demolish what hitherto had been an American preserve. When the crews met, if the UBC/VRC eight did not win, they still managed to give their rivals a painful and exhausting challenge to remember. By the opening of the Commonwealth Games, Vancouver's rowing community was quietly confident that the Canadian eight would surprise the world.

The 1954 Commonwealth Games teams arrived in mid-July, but attention was focused on track and field, where, it was rumoured, an Englishman named Roger Bannister was going to try to run the mile in four minutes or less. As far as the Canadian public knew, rowing would not be one of the exciting events for Canada. The "Miracle Mile" took place between Roger Bannister and John Landy at Empire Stadium, but the biggest upset of the games occurred when the Canadian eight, generally considered a crew of green kids, finished the 2000-metre course two and a half lengths ahead of Thames Rowing Club, the English crew. As the official history of the Games told it: "The crowd was literally stunned by the fantastic victory and limp from excitement." For the first time ever, Canada had won a gold medal for eight in international competition beyond competition with the Americans.

After the final race, Prince Philip, Duke of Edinburgh met with the chairman of the VRC rowing committee, Nelles Stacey, and asked what the club owed its victory to. The answer came back: "Frank Read, Frank Read, Frank Read." Intrigued, the Duke asked to meet Read and said, "You must come to Henley." Read was not impressed, but the rest of the VRC committee took it as a royal command, and training and preparation followed until the crew left for England and the Grand Challenge Cup.

The 1950s had seen the reassurance of rowing in all countries, not the least of which was the then Soviet Union. There, sport had become a political tool in the Cold War, designed to show, through the excellence of its athletes, that the Communist way was superior to the way of the West. Their efforts had included rowing, and in 1954 they had appeared at the Henley Royal and gone home with all the titles. It was, to say the least, embarrassing, and no one seemed able to do anything about it. In 1955 the invasion by these seemingly "professionals" state-subsidised oarsmen happened again and left the guardians of amateur sport, the Henley stewards, shaking their heads in dismay. Still, some hope existed; after all, this unknown crew, which had just won the gold medal at the Commonwealth Games, was entered and though the Soviets were heavily favoured, miracles did occasionally happen.

For the Canadian rowing club, the experience was not without hazards; their shell was caught in the middle of a British dock strike. Canadian and British officials tried their best, but the unions were unyielding and the boat was not released until the dispute had been settled. Meanwhile, the shell suffered the ravages of weeks of weathering and was no longer rowable. UBC/VRC used a borrowed boat.

UBC/VRC met Krasnoe Znamia, the Russian club, in the semifinals, where the Soviets quickly jumped into a three-quarter-length lead. At the quarter mile, the Russians dropped their rate to thirty-six, Vancouver to thirty-three. At the half-mile post the Russian lead was cut to six feet, and by the three-quarters mark, the Canadians were leading by six feet. When that position was announced, the vast crowd, expecting an easy Russian win, rose to their feet with a roar. To an ever-increasing win, the Vancouver crew rowed on to win by one and a half lengths. The Russians surrounded the victorious crew and marvelled at the style of "coming off the feather at the last moment." They called it the Read stroke and wondered, as do all losing crews, whether this was the secret of the Canadians' success.

Nelles Stacey later stated that there were three records set that day at Henley: "Never had there been such wild cheering by a Henley crowd; never had the staid Henley stewards been seen to throw their caps in the air; and never before, during a race, had all the bars been empty."

In the final the next day against the University of Pennsylvania, the crew lost by a third of a length in what was described as one of the finest races of the day. The loss was greeted as a victory: The House of Commons sent their congratulations, the mayor of Vancouver greeted them on arrival and gave them a motor parade through the city, followed by a formal address on the courthouse steps. Each member of the crew received a gold medal in recognition of their fine showing.

After this, the next challenge was the 1956 Olympic Games in Melbourne, Australia. As a result of the strenuous training program, the crew rowed over 1,250 miles in three months. Neither gave any hint of what was to come. Virtually unnoticed training alongside the eight, and given little chance for success, was a coxless four stroked by Don Arnold, with Walter d'Hondt, Lorne Loomer and Archie MacKinon, coached by assistant coach John Warren. Frank Read remarked, "They don't look like much, but they sure move the boat." Still, they were not remarkable enough to be included in the Canadian Olympic Association's plans for an eleven-man team. Only promising to underwrite the costs of the trip was the Vancouver Rowing Committee able to finally persuade the COA to let the four go.

In the first heat on Lake Ballarat, 50 miles north of Melbourne, the four beat Germany by six lengths, with Australia and Denmark behind. In the semifinals, the winning margin was an astounding ten lengths over France, Russia and Poland. The eight, meanwhile, finished second to Australia in the first heat and sent the Americans to the repêchage (a second chance to qualify) in a stunning upset.

In the finals, the four went out and beat the United States by five lengths, with Italy and France following. This team, one of several high-ranking crews of coach Frank Read, achieved probably the largest victory of margin of any crew in the modern games. The victory signaled a decisive shift of Canadian rowing excellence from its former traditional base of Toronto, Ontario to the Pacific Coast. It was Canada's first ever Olympic Gold Medal in rowing.

How close the eight came to winning another gold medal will always be a matter of speculation. The Americans won by half a length, but three of their oarsmen collapsed and two required medical attention.

On their return to a justifiably proud Vancouver, someone in the crowd asked Read, "When did you think they were going to win?" Read's reply, "When they left the boathouse."

Read coached again for the 1960 Olympic games, held in Rome. There, the race in the final for the eight became a battle between Canada and (at that time) West Germany, with a crew from the German rowing academy at Ratzeburg. With 200 metres to go, the Ratzeburg crew put on a magnificent spurt to win by four seconds. Canada's silver medal was the only medal Canada won at the Rome Olympics. It also marked the end of the Frank Read era.

=== 1964 Olympics ===
Expectations were not high for George Hungerford and Roger Jackson when they competed at the 1964 Tokyo Olympics. In August, two months before the Olympics, Hungerford had come down with mononucleosis and was forced to give up his seat in the men's eights. Six weeks before Tokyo, Hungerford recovered enough to train and created a formidable partnership with Jackson. Because of the hasty manner in which the Hungerford/Jackson team had been assembled, they sat at the start line of the final with a borrowed boat. But the dark horses from Canada raced their scull to its second gold medal in eight years.

=== Notable results ===
2015
3rd U-17 Men's 4x Royal Canadian Henley Regatta
4th U-17 Men's 2x Royal Canadian Henley Regatta

2008
1st Master A Singles Men Royal Canadian Henley Regatta
2nd U-19 Women's 4x Royal Canadian Henley Regatta
3rd U-19 Women's 4x Royal Canadian Henley Regatta

2007
1st Senior-Master Doubles Men 60+ Head of the Charles Regatta
3rd Master Singles Men Head of the Charles Regatta
2nd U-17 Women's 4x Royal Canadian Henley Regatta

2006
1st Master Singles Men Head of the Charles Regatta
1st Director's Challenge Quads Men Head of the Charles Regatta

2005
2nd Master A Singles Men Edmonton World Masters Games

1964
1st Coxless Pair 2- Tokyo Olympics

1960
2nd Men's Eight 8+ Rome Olympics

1956
1st Men's Coxless Four 4- Melbourne Olympics
2nd Men's Eight 8+ Melbourne Olympics

1954
1st Men's Eight 8+ Vancouver Commonwealth Games

1932

3rd Double Sculls 2x Los Angeles Olympics

1924
2nd Coxless Four Paris Olympics

== Other sports ==
=== Rugby ===
The VRC celebrated 100 years of rugby in 2008. In the autumn of 1908, VRC rowers seeking to keep fit during their off-season formed a rugby team, which has come to be known as "Rowers". The Rowers field teams in the 1st and 4th tiers of BC Rugby Union, Men's Premier and Division 3. The 2026 season saw the men's Division 1 team get elevated back to the BC Premier League.

International players from VRC Rugby have included: Ian Stuart, Richard Bice, Ian Cooper, Chris Mitchaluk, Ian Kennedy, Andy Wilson, Ruth Hellerud-Brown, Heather Wilson, Dawn Keim, Scott Harnden, Dawn Williams, Angie Hay, Mutya Macatumpag, Brad Martin, Rob Houston, Mike Webb and Stirling Richmond.

The scarlet and white hoops of Rowers have toured the United States, Australia, New Zealand, Hong Kong, Japan, Korea, Philippines, France, Scotland, England and Wales, and each year Rowers host touring teams from all over the world, many of whom have decades of touring history with the Rowing Club.

Each year at the club Captain's Dinner, the club honours not only past captains of victorious teams, but also acknowledges all those who have contributed, on the field or off, to the club's successes.

=== Ice hockey ===
In the early 1900s, the Vancouver Rowing Club participated in senior men's ice hockey. Their team won the first ever Savage Cup which was awarded at the end of the 1912-13 season.

=== Field hockey ===
The field hockey section of the rowing club is VRC Jokers Field Hockey Club, commonly known as just "The Jokers".

The Jokers were founded in 1964, and have a long history of touring. They currently have a number of men's and women's teams playing in various divisions of the Vancouver Men's Field Hockey League and Vancouver Women's Field Hockey Association. The Jokers are well known across Vancouver and the Lower Mainland for the social aspect of their club, and can be recognized by their distinct orange uniform.

Currently the Jokers field 2 men's teams and 5 women's teams in the VMFHL and VWFHA respectively. The men's teams, named Jokers A and Jokers B play in Division One and Division Three. In the women's league, Jokers Arrows play in Division Two, Jokers Juggernauts and Jokers LFG play in Division 4, Jokers Orange Crush play in Division 5 and Jokers Wild plays in Division 6.

==== History ====
The Jokers Field Hockey Club was founded in 1964 by Victor Warren, John Young, DK Fraser and Joost Wolsak.

During the 1963/64 season, a few field hockey players at UBC realized that they wanted to continue to play together after their graduation. They checked out some of the local teams, but none of them really interested these gentlemen, who still wanted to play good, competitive hockey, but with an active social side to it. So, this group of “hockey pioneers” formed their own team. DK Fraser chose the name "Jokers" after concluding “Well, we’re a bunch of Jokers." John Young was a recently graduated architect, who used his skills to design the now famous Jokers logo. And the distinct orange colour for the uniforms came from Joost Wolsak (who is Dutch). The newly formed Jokers team entered into the British Columbia Lower Mainland Grass Hockey League in Division 1, circumventing the rule that new teams had to start in the second division by attending the league's AGM en masse and passing a motion for the exception (winning by a single vote).

Over the next four years, Jokers added more teams (named Jokers Too, Jokers Also and Jokers Again).

In 1967, following the first mixed hockey tournament in Vancouver, the first women’s team joined the Jokers. The women's team was made up mostly of wives and spectators, was formed by Annemieke de Leeuw and Judy Peat, (née van Dishoek). The first coach of the women's team was Victor Warren.

In 1974, Victor Warren and then Jokers president Stuart Wilson worked with the VRC Rugby team to form a field hockey section of the Vancouver Rowing Club.

== See also ==
- List of heritage buildings in Vancouver
- Official club website
- VRC Jokers website
