= Douglas McDonald =

Douglas McDonald may refer to:

- Douglas McDonald (rower) (born 1935), Canadian rowing athlete
- Dougie McDonald (born 1965), Scottish football referee
- Douglas McDonald (powerlifter), American Paralympic powerlifter, see Powerlifting at the 1988 Summer Paralympics

== See also ==
- Douglas MacDonald (1900–1996), Canadian miner and politician
- Doug MacDonald (born 1969), Canadian ice hockey player
