= Ctibor Reiskup =

Czechoslovak rower

Personal information
- Born: 14 April 1929 Liptovský Peter, Czechoslovakia
- Died: 2 February 1963 (aged 33) Roháče, Czechoslovakia

Sport
- Sport: Rowing
Medal record
Men's rowing
Representing Czechoslovakia
European Rowing Championships
Gold medal – first place	1956 Bled	Eight
Bronze medal – third place	1957 Duisburg	Eight

Ctibor Reiskup (14 April 1929 – 2 February 1963) was a Slovak rower. He competed at the 1956 European Rowing Championships in Bled, Yugoslavia, with the men's eight where they won the gold medal. The same team went to the 1956 Summer Olympics in Melbourne with the men's eight where they were eliminated in the semi-final. He died on 2 February 1963 in Roháče (region of Western Tatras), aged 33.
