= Sunaga =

Sunaga (written: 須永 or 須長) is a Japanese surname. Notable people with the surname include:

- Hideki Sunaga (須永 英輝, born 1985), Japanese baseball player
- Sadahiro Sunaga (須永 定博, born 1934), Japanese rower
- Yuki Sunaga (須長 由季, born 1980), Japanese windsurfer
