= Verbin =

Verbin or Werbin (Russian: Вербин), feminine: Verbina is a Russian-language surname. Notable people with the surname include:

- Ayelet Nahmias-Verbin (born 1970), Israeli lawyer and politician
- Ernest Verbin (born 1934), Soviet rower
