= 1956 European Rowing Championships =

- Venue: Lake Bled
- Location: Bled, Yugoslavia

The 1956 European Rowing Championships were rowing championships held on Lake Bled in the city of Bled which, at the time, was located in Yugoslavia. Men competed in all seven Olympic boat classes (M1x, M2x, M2-, M2+, M4-, M4+, M8+), and women entered in five boat classes (W1x, W2x, W4x+, W4+, W8+). Many of the men competed two months later at the Olympic Games in Melbourne; women would first be allowed to compete at Olympic level in 1976.

== Background ==
FISA, the International Rowing Federation, decided at its congress held just prior to the 1955 Championships in Ghent to award the 1956 Championships to Bled, and that the 1957 Championships were to be hosted by Duisburg.

== Medal summary – women's events ==
Event	Gold		Silver		Bronze	
Event	Country & rowers	Time	Country & rowers	Time	Country & rowers	Time
W1x	West Germany; Ingrid Scholz		Austria; Eva Sika		Hungary; Kornélia Pap	
W2x	Czechoslovakia; Svetla Bartakova; Hana Musilova		Soviet Union; Nina Opalenko; Ekaterina Semlyanskaya		Hungary; Hertha Manger; Gisela Pünner	
W4+	Soviet Union; Olimpiada Mikhaylova; Galina Putyrskaya; Lyudmila Blasko; Natalya Morozova; Vera Savrimovich (cox)		Poland; Maria Dopierala; Maria Golebiewska; Sabina Zdzienicka; Maria Kowalska; Danuta Migocka (cox)		Romania; Felicia Urziceanu; Elsa Oxenfeld; Stela Georgescu; Lucia Dumitrescu; Angela Codreanu (cox)	
W4x+	Soviet Union; Yevgeniya Tserbakova; Lidiya Zontova; Galina Kopilova; Lyubov Trosenkova; Viktoriya Dobrodeeva (cox)		Hungary; Istvánné Granek; Ida Orodán; Józsefné Raskó; Jánosné Kőszegi; Ilona Skotniczky (cox)		Romania; Florica Bruteanu; Viorica Udrescu; Stela Stanciu; Maria Laub; Stefania Borisov (cox)	
W8+	Soviet Union; Lyudmila Matveyeva; Vera Taranda; Alexandra Afonykina; Vera Mikhaylova; Nina Korobkova; Zinaida Korotova; Zinaida Trofimova; Tamara Stolyarova; Maria Fomicheva (cox)		Romania; Felicia Urziceanu; Marta Kardos; Iuliana Toganel; Rita Schob; Sonia Bulugioiu; Elsa Oxenfeld; Etelca Laub; Maria Bucur-Maimon; Angela Codreanu (cox)		East Germany; Ingrid Matthes; Marianne Falk; Gerda Weith; Ursula Nawrot; Ingeborg Könnecke; Hella Schulz; Anita Blankenfeld; Helga Richter; Ursula Gesch (cox)	

== Medal summary – men's events ==
Event	Gold		Silver		Bronze	
Event	Country & rowers	Time	Country & rowers	Time	Country & rowers	Time
M1x	Soviet Union; Vyacheslav Ivanov		West Germany; Klaus von Fersen		Poland; Teodor Kocerka	
M2x	Soviet Union; Aleksandr Berkutov; Yuriy Tyukalov		West Germany; Thomas Schneider; Kurt Hipper		Czechoslovakia; Albert Krajmer; František Reich	
M2-	Soviet Union; Igor Buldakov; Viktor Ivanov		Austria; Alfred Sageder; Josef Kloimstein		Belgium; Michel Knuysen; Bob Baetens	
M2+	West Germany; Karl-Heinrich von Groddeck; Horst Arndt; Rainer Borkowsky (cox)		Switzerland; Gottfried Kottmann; Rolf Streuli; Peter Rüede (cox)		Austria; Alfred Sageder; Josef Kloimstein; Franz König (cox)	
M4-	Italy; Giuseppe Moioli; Attilio Cantoni; Giovanni Zucchi; Abbondio Marcelli		Hungary; Géza Ütő; Csaba Kovács; Rezső Riheczky; Zoltán Kávay		West Germany; Willi Montag; Horst Stobbe; Gunther Kaschlun; Manfred Fitze	
M4+	Finland; Reino Poutanen; Kauko Hänninen; Veli Lehtelä; Toimi Pitkänen; Matti Niemi (cox)		Soviet Union; Yury Popov; Andrej Archipov; Valentin Zanin; Yaroslav Cherstvy; Anatoly Fetissov (cox)		Italy; Franco Trincavelli; Angelo Vanzin; Romano Sgheiz; Alberto Winkler; Ivo Stefanoni (cox)	
M8+	Czechoslovakia; Josef Věntus; Eduard Antoch; Ctibor Reiskup; Jan Švéda; Josef Švec; Zdeněk Žára; Jan Jindra; Stanislav Lusk; Miroslav Koranda (cox)		France; René Massiasse; Maurice Houdayer; Jean-Jacques Vignon; Édouard Leguery; Maurice Bas; Richard Duc; Émile Clerc; Santé Marcuzzi; Jacques Vilcoq (cox)		Hungary; Ferenc Demeter; Gabor Dobay; Tibor Bedekovits; Imre Kaffka; Laszlo Kerenyi; Imre Kemény; Pál Bakos; Sandor Emödi; Gyula Lengyel (cox)	
