= Yasuhiko =

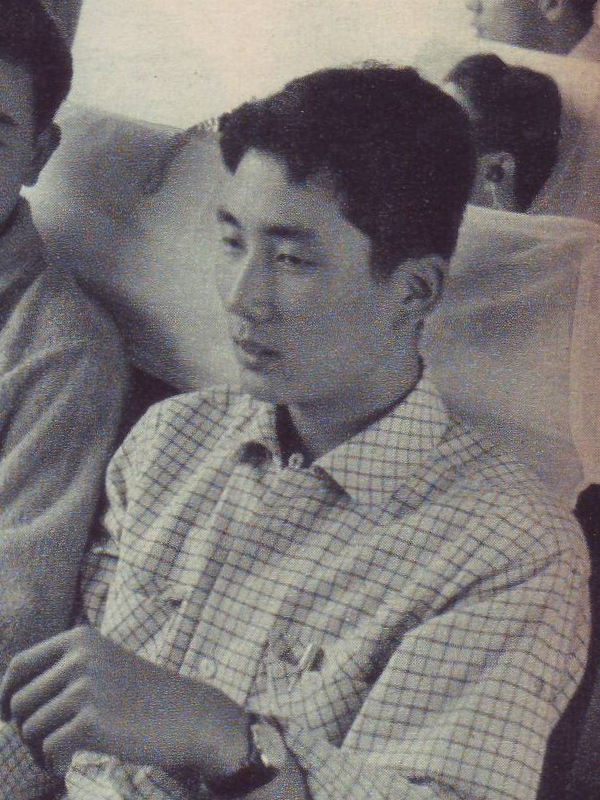
- Yasuhiko Kawamura (1940–2012), Japanese baseball player
- Pronunciation: jasɯçiko (IPA)
- Gender: Male

Origin
- Origin: Japanese
- Meaning: Different meanings depending on the kanji used

Yasuhiko is both a masculine Japanese given name and a Japanese surname.

== Written forms ==
Yasuhiko can be written using different combinations of kanji characters. Here are some examples:

- 康彦, "healthy, elegant boy"
- 康比古, "healthy, young man (archaic)"
- 靖彦, "peaceful, elegant boy"
- 安彦, "tranquil, elegant boy"
- 保彦, "preserve, elegant boy"
- 泰彦, "peaceful, elegant boy"
- 易彦, "divination, elegant boy"
- 恭彦, "respectful, elegant boy"

The name can also be written in hiragana やすひこ or katakana ヤスヒコ.

== Notable people with the given name Yasuhiko ==
- Yasuhiko Arakawa (荒川 泰彦; born 1952), Japanese physicist
- Prince Asaka Yasuhiko (朝香宮 鳩彦王, 1906–1981), officer in the Imperial Japanese Army
- Yasuhiko Kawamura (河村 保彦, 1940–2012), Japanese baseball player
- Yasuhiko Kawazu (川津 泰彦, born 1966), Japanese voice actor
- Yasuhiko Yabuta (薮田 安彦, born 1973), Japanese baseball pitcher
- Yasuhiko Imai (今井 靖彦, born 1965), Japanese stunt man
- Yasuhiko Fukuoka (福岡 保彦, born ), Japanese composer
- Yasuhiko Fukuda (福田 裕彦, born 1957), Japanese composer
- Yasuhiko Takahashi (髙橋 靖彦; born 1985), Japanese wheel gymnastics acrobat
- Yasuhiko Takeda (武田 泰彦; born 1937), Japanese rower

== Notable people with the surname Yasuhiko ==
- Yoshikazu Yasuhiko (安彦 良和, born 1947), Japanese animator and manga artist

== See also ==
- 18818 Yasuhiko, a main-belt asteroid
