= Junichi Kato =

Junichi Kato may refer to:

- Junichi Kato (rower) (born 1935), Japanese rower
- Junichi Kato (streamer) (born 1985), Japanese streamer
