= Lawrence West =

Lawrence West may refer to:

- Lawrence West station, a station on the Yonge-University Spadina line of the subway system in Toronto, Canada
- Lawrence West (rower) (born 1935), Canadian Olympic rower
