= Dawn Keim =

Canadian rugby union player

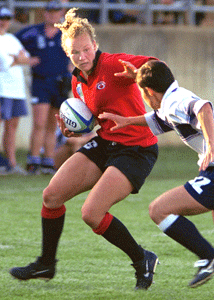
- Born: 15 November 1977 (age 48)
- Height: 176 cm (5 ft 9 in)
- Weight: 70 kg (154 lb)
- University: University of Leeds

Rugby union career
- Position: Back row
Amateur team(s)
Years	Team	Apps	(Points)
–	London Wasps		
International career
Years	Team	Apps	(Points)
1999 - 2004	Canada	18	

Dawn Keim (born 15 November 1977) is a Canadian female rugby union player. She participated at the 2002 Women's Rugby World Cup. She was an honorable mention for the list of the ten greatest North American rugby players.

From Vancouver, Keim played back row for Canada. She played club rugby with the Vancouver Rowing Club and the Wasps Ladies in London.

Keim played at the provincial level for British Columbia on the under-19 and senior team. She also played on the national under-23 team before earning her first at the Can-Am test match in 1999. The same year, Keim represented Canada for the Tri-Nation Tournament in North Palmerston, New Zealand.
