= Adrian Monger =

Australian rower

Personal information
- Full name: Adrian Calero Monger
- Born: 6 December 1932
- Died: 10 July 2016 (aged 83)

Sport
- Club: Melbourne Uni Boat Club; Mercantile Rowing Club

Achievements and titles
- Olympic finals: Melbourne 1956
- National finals: King's Cup 1954–1956
Medal record
Men's rowing
Representing Australia
Olympic Games
Bronze medal – third place	1956 Melbourne	Eight

Adrian Calero Monger (6 December 1932 – 10 July 2016) was an Australian rower. He was twice Australian national champion and competed at the 1956 Summer Olympics where he won a bronze medal in the men's eight.

== Club and state rowing ==
Monger was educated at Geelong Grammar School where he took up rowing. As a resident at Trinity College at Melbourne University he became involved with the Melbourne University Boat Club. Later he rowed from the Mercantile Rowing Club in Melbourne. .

He first made state selection for Victoria in 1954 in the men's eight contesting the King's Cup at the annual Australian Interstate Regatta. He rowed in further Victorian King's Cup eights in 1955 and 1956, and those crews were victorious in 1954 and 1956.

== International representative rowing ==
In 1956 for the Melbourne Olympics the winning Kings Cup Victorian eight was selected as the Australian men's eight excepting for the 3 seat – Benfield from New South Wales. Monger rowed in the seven seat in the thrilling final where the Australian eight took it to the US and Canadian crews and came away with a bronze medal.
