= Brian Doyle (rower) =

Australian rower

Personal information
- Born: 18 August 1930
- Died: 1 June 2008 (aged 77)
- Education: Xavier College
- Years active: 1946-1956

Sport
- Sport: Rowing
- Club: Mercantile Rowing Club
Medal record
Men's rowing
Representing Australia
Men's rowing
| Bronze medal – third place | 1956 Melbourne | Eight |

Brian John Doyle (18 August 1930 – 1 June 2008) was an Australian Olympic medal winning rower who competed in the 1956 Summer Olympics.

== Rowing career ==
Doyle took up rowing at Xavier College in Melbourne. He achieved the rare distinction of rowing in Xavier's first VIII at the APS Head of the River in all four of his senior school years from 1946 to 1949. His senior club rowing was with the Mercantile Rowing Club in Melbourne.

Doyle was selected in Victorian state representative King's Cup crews contesting the men's Interstate Eight-Oared Championship at the Australian Rowing Championships on six consecutive occasions from 1952 to 1956. Four of those crews won the King's Cup, with Doyle at stroke on two occasions.

In 1956 for the Melbourne Olympics the winning Kings Cup Victorian eight was selected as the Australian men's eight excepting for the 3 seat – Benfield from New South Wales. Doyle stroked the Australian eight in their Olympic campaign to a thrilling final where the Australian eight took it to the US and Canadian crews and came away with a bronze medal.

== Coach and administrator ==
After active rowing Doyle coached many school and club crews at Xavier College and Mercantile. He coached his sons David and Mark to a gold medal won together in a coxless pair at the World Rowing U23 Championships in Vienna in 1982. David and Mark both became rowing Olympians, Mark a world champion.

Doyle was vice-captain of the Mercantile club for a period and chairman of selectors during the 1980s. In 2010 he was inducted as a member of the Rowing Victoria Hall of Fame.
