= Georgy Gushchenko =

Soviet rower (1931–2024)

Personal information
- Born: 2 March 1931
- Died: 8 January 2024 (aged 92)

Sport
- Sport: Rowing
Medal record
Men's rowing
Representing the Soviet Union
European Rowing Championships
Silver medal – second place	1953 Copenhagen	Coxed four
Silver medal – second place	1957 Duisburg	Eight
Bronze medal – third place	1958 Poznań	Eight
Bronze medal – third place	1959 Mâcon	Eight

Georgy Ivanovich Gushchenko (Russian: Георгий Иванович Гущенко; 2 March 1931 — 8 January 2024) was a Russian rower who represented the Soviet Union. He competed at the 1952 Summer Olympics in Helsinki with the men's coxed four where they were eliminated in the semi-final repêchage. He competed at the 1956 Summer Olympics in Melbourne with the men's eight where they were eliminated in the semi-final. Gushchenko died on 8 January 2024, at the age of 92.
