= Alan Watson (rower) =

British rower

Personal information
- Nationality: British (English)
- Born: 9 July 1929 Edmonton, London, England
- Died: 15 February 2007 (aged 77)

Sport
- Sport: Rowing
- Club: Thames Rowing Club
Medal record
Rowing
Representing England
British Empire & Commonwealth Games
Silver medal – second place	1954 Vancouver	Eights

Alan Richard Watson (9 July 1929 – 15 February 2007) was a British rower who competed at the 1956 Summer Olympics.

== Biography ==
At the 1956 Olympic Games in Melbourne, Watson participated in the men's eight event.

He represented the English team at the 1954 British Empire and Commonwealth Games held in Vancouver, Canada, where he won the silver medal in the eights event.

He was a member of the Thames Rowing Club.
