= Cosimo Campioto =

Italian rower (1934–2019)

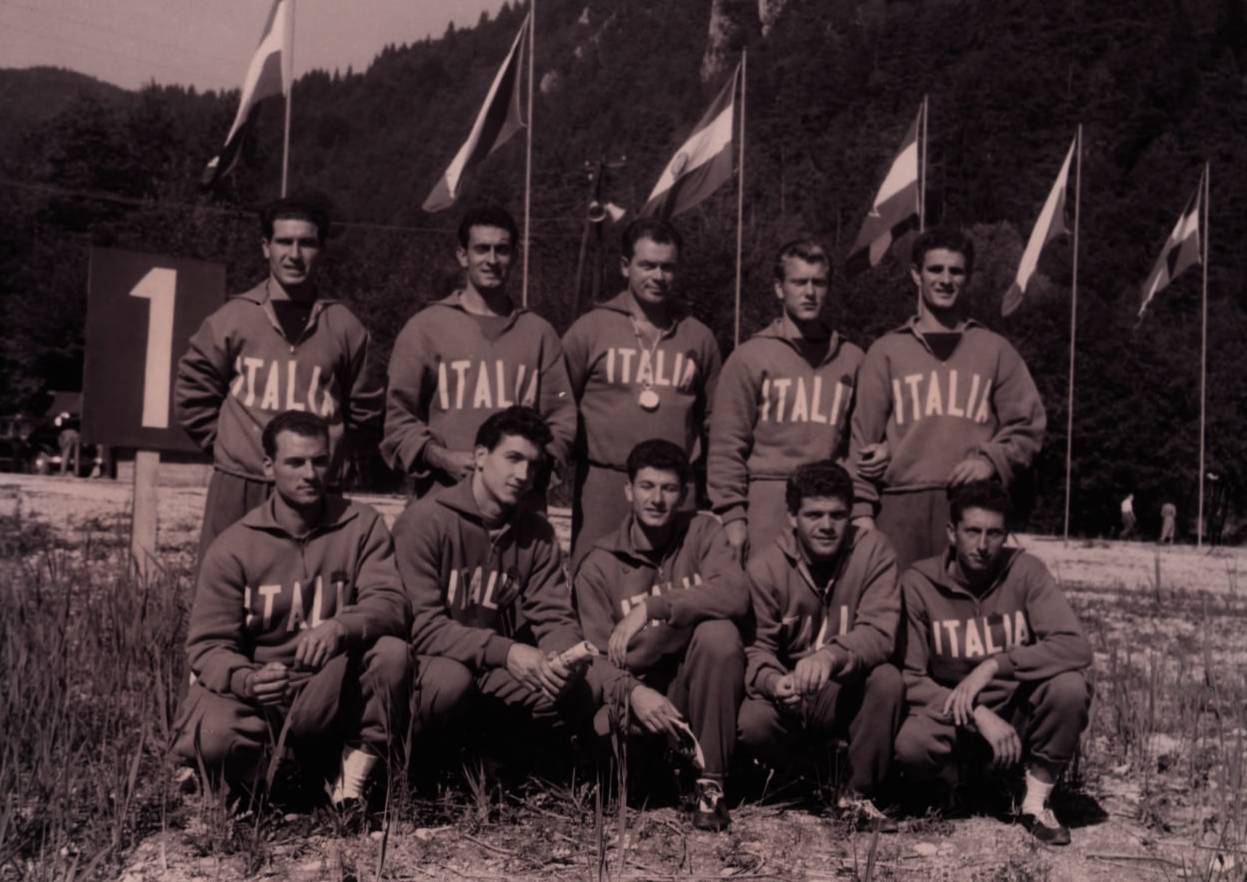

Personal information
- Nationality: Italian
- Born: 12 July 1934; Brindisi, Italy
- Died: 12 May 2019 (aged 84)

Sport
- Sport: Rowing

Cosimo Campioto (12 July 1934 – 12 May 2019) was an Italian rower. He competed in the men's eight event at the 1956 Summer Olympics.

== See also ==
- Antonio Amato
- Salvatore Nuvoli
- Livio Tesconi
- Antonio Casoar
- Gian Carlo Casalini
- Sergio Tagliapietra
- Arrigo Menicocci
- Vincenzo Rubolotta
