= Yoshiki Hiki =

Japanese rower (1933–2022)

Personal information
- Nationality: Japanese
- Born: 28 July 1933; Tokyo
- Died: 14 October 2022 (aged 89)

Sport
- Sport: Rowing

Yoshiki Hiki (28 July 1933 – 14 October 2022) was a Japanese rower. He competed in the men's eight event at the 1956 Summer Olympics.
