= Takashi Imamura =

Japanese rower (born 1934)

Personal information
- Nationality: Japanese
- Born: 1934 (age 90–91)

Sport
- Sport: Rowing

Takashi Imamura (born 1934) is a Japanese rower. He competed in the men's eight event at the 1956 Summer Olympics.
