= Yozo Iwasaki =

Japanese rower (born 1936)

Personal information
- Nationality: Japanese
- Born: 1936 (age 88–89)

Sport
- Sport: Rowing

Yozo Iwasaki (岩崎 洋三, born 1936) is a Japanese rower. He competed in the men's eight event at the 1956 Summer Olympics.
