= Maurice Houdayer =

French rower (1931–2020)

Personal information
- Born: 18 July 1931
- Died: 1 October 2020 (aged 89)

Sport
- Sport: Rowing
Medal record
Men's rowing
Representing France
European Rowing Championships
Silver medal – second place	1956 Bled	Eight

Maurice Houdayer (18 July 1931 – 1 October 2020) was a French rower.

== Career ==
He competed at the 1956 European Rowing Championships in Bled, Yugoslavia, with the men's eight where they won the silver medal. The same team went to the 1956 Summer Olympics in Melbourne with the men's eight where they were eliminated in the round one heat.
