= David Boykett =

Australian rower (1934–2016)

Personal information
- Born: 19 August 1934
- Died: 10 February 2016 (aged 81)
- Education: Scotch College, Melbourne

Sport
- Club: Mercantile Rowing Club

Achievements and titles
- Olympic finals: Men's eight Melbourne 1956
- National finals: King's Cup 1956-59,61,64,66.
Medal record
Men's rowing
Bronze medal – third place	1956 Melbourne	Eight

David Hebbert Boykett OAM (19 August 1934 – 10 February 2016) was an Australian representative rower and rowing coach. He was a six-time national champion, won a bronze medal at the 1956 Summer Olympics and competed at the 1964 Summer Olympics and at the 1962 and 1966 World Rowing Championships.

== Club and state rowing ==
Boykett was educated at Scotch College, Melbourne where he took up rowing. He rowed in that school's 1st VIII in both of his senior years 1951 and 1952, both to victory in the Head of the River (Victoria). His senior rowing was with the Mercantile Rowing Club in Melbourne where later he was Club President from 1993 to 1997.

Boykett was selected in Victorian state representative men's senior eights contesting the King's Cup at the Interstate Regatta within the Australian Rowing Championships on four consecutive occasions from 1956 to 1959 and then further in 1961, 1964 and 1966. Six of those crews won the King's Cup, with Boykett at stroke in 1961 and 1966.

== International representative rowing ==
In 1956 for the Melbourne Olympics the winning Kings Cup Victorian eight was selected as the Australian men's eight excepting for the 3 seat – Benfield from New South Wales. Boykett rowed in the two seat with the Australian eight in their Olympic campaign to a thrilling final where the Australian eight took it to the US and Canadian crews and earned a bronze medal.

For the 1962 Commonwealth Games in Perth, Boykett was initially selected as an emergency for the all Victorian men's eight. Last-minute changes saw him picked to stroke the men's coxless four who were eliminated in the repechage and missed the final. For the inaugural 1962 World Rowing Championships in Lucerne, some minor changes were made in the men's eight, but it remained an all Victorian crew built around that years's King's Cup victors. In Lucerne, Boykett rowed in the three seat of the men's eight to a fifth placing.

For the 1964 Tokyo Olympics the winning Victorian King's Cup eight was again selected in toto. They took a new Sargent & Burton eight to the Olympics but quickly saw that its design and technology were way behind the European-built Donoratico and Stampfli shells being used by the other nations. With Boykett in the two seat, they raced in a borrowed Donoratico eight for the B final and rowed to an overall eighth place in the Olympic regatta.

Continuing the practice of the time, for the 1966 World Rowing Championships the winning Victorian 1966 King's Cup crew were selected in toto as the Australian eight. Boykett had stroked that crew to a surprise victory over fancied NSW rivals and a well credentialled South Australian eight. At the World Championships in Bled the all-Victorian eight placed 2nd in the heat and repechage but missed the A final with their 5th placing in the semifinal. They finished in 10th place overall.

== Teaching, coaching and accolades ==
Boykett was a PE teacher and was on staff at his alma mater Scotch College, Melbourne for 34 years from 1963.

Boykett's first coaching roles were with Victorian men's eights contesting the King's Cup. He coached the 1969 and 1970 crews to victory. In 1970 he took the Australian men's eight to the World Championships where they finished fifth. He coached Scotch College first VIIIs from 1979 to 1982.

He was FISA qualified umpire from 1960 to 1978 and officiated as an Australian and Victorian umpire for over 40 years up till 2002. He was a life member of Mercantile Rowing Club and of Rowing Victoria.

In 2010 he was inducted as a member of the Rowing Victoria Hall of Fame. In 2014 he was awarded a Medal of the Order of Australia for his service to the sport of rowing, including coaching, administration and fundraising.
