= Yasukuni Watanabe =

Japanese rower (born 1936)

Personal information
- Nationality: Japanese
- Born: 22 October 1936 (age 88)

Sport
- Sport: Rowing

Yasukuni Watanabe (born 22 October 1936) is a Japanese rower. He competed in the men's eight event at the 1956 Summer Olympics.
