= Richard Wheadon =

British rower

Personal information
- Nationality: British
- Born: 31 March 1933 (age 91); Wandsworth, England

Sport
- Sport: Rowing

Richard Wheadon (born 31 March 1933) is a British rower. He competed in the men's eight event at the 1956 Summer Olympics.
