= Michael Delahooke =

British rower

Personal information
- Nationality: British
- Born: 24 September 1935 (age 89); Hampstead, England

Sport
- Sport: Rowing

Michael Delahooke (born 24 September 1935) is a British rower. He competed in the men's eight event at the 1956 Summer Olympics.
