= Antonio Casoar =

Italian rower

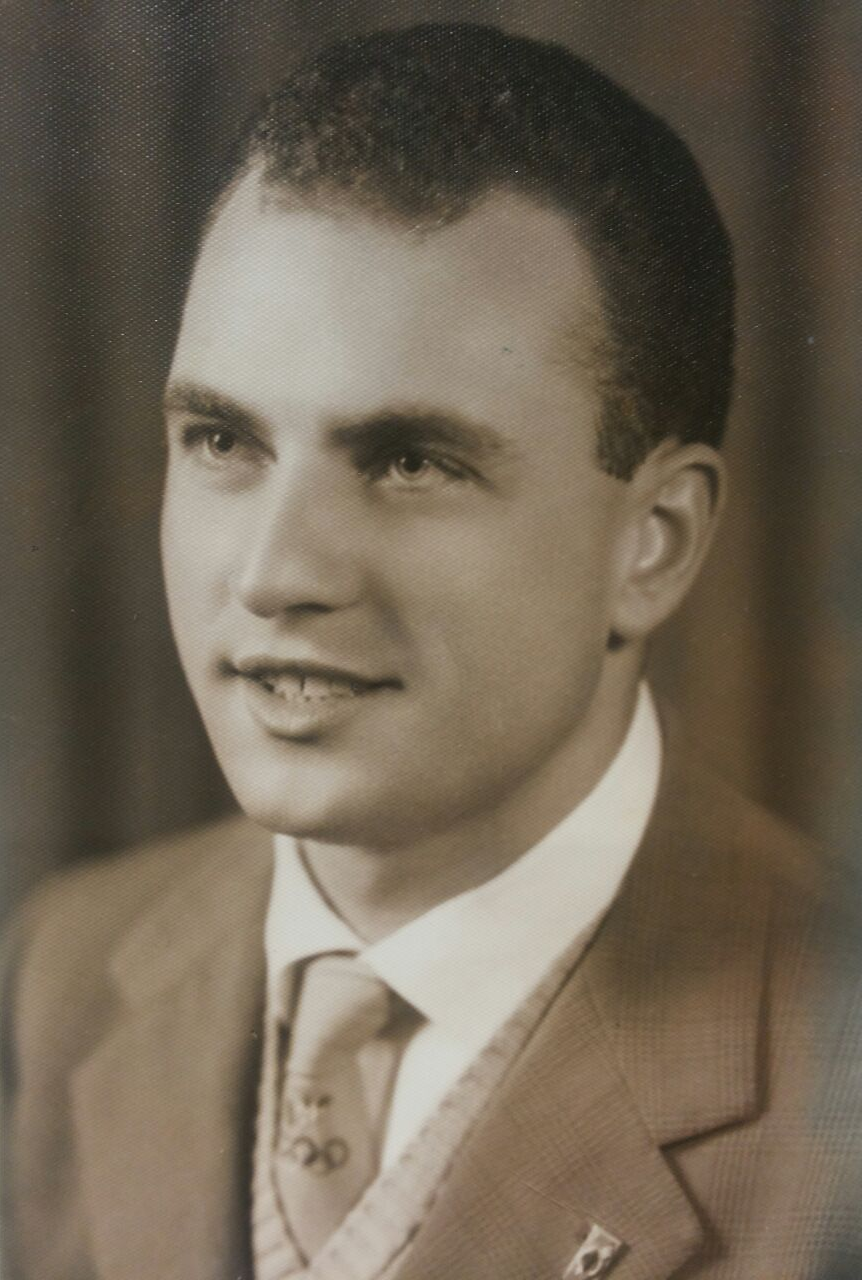
- Antonio Casoar 1956

Personal information
- Nickname: Tony
- Nationality: Italian
- Born: 17 January 1934; Brindisi, Italy
- Died: 6 July 2015 (aged 81); Melbourne, Australia
- Spouse: Katherine Casoar (Born.1942; Married.1967; Widowed 2015)
- Children: Maria Casoar (born. 1968) Pietro Casoar (born. 1971)

Sport
- Sport: Rowing
- Position: Seat Four (4) in the 1956 Olympic Games Men's 8+

Antonio Casoar (17 January 1934 – 6 July 2015) was an Italian rower. He competed in the men's eight event at the 1956 Summer Olympics.

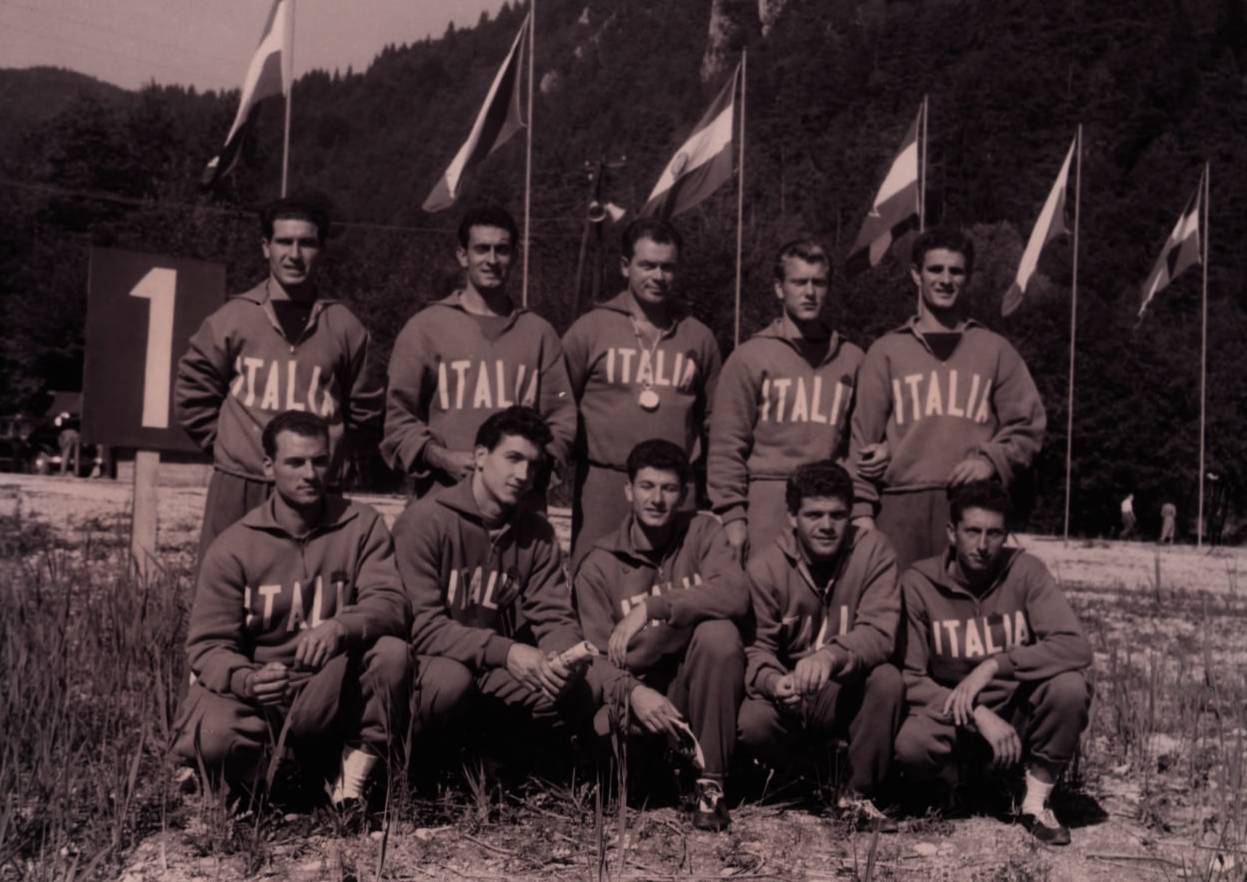

== See also ==
- Antonio Amato
- Salvatore Nuvoli
- Cosimo Campioto
- Livio Tesconi
- Arrigo Menicocci
- Gian Carlo Casalini
- Sergio Tagliapietra
- Vincenzo Rubolotta
