= Antonio Amato =

Italian rower

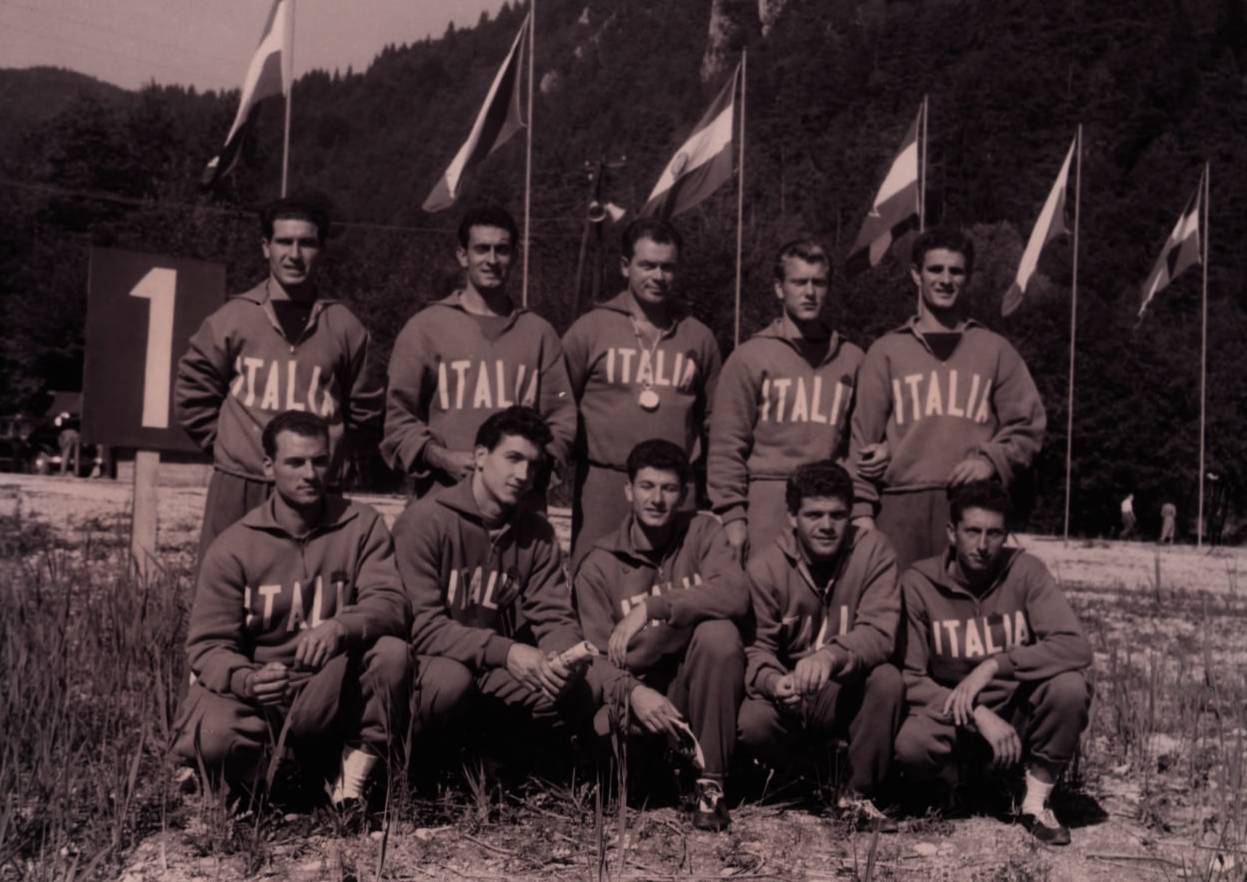

Personal information
- Nationality: Italian
- Born: 11 November 1934; Tremiti Islands, Italy
- Died: 3 February 2021 (aged 86)

Sport
- Sport: Rowing

Antonio Amato (11 November 1934 – 3 February 2021) was an Italian rower. He competed in the men's eight event at the 1956 Summer Olympics.

== See also ==
- Salvatore Nuvoli
- Cosimo Campioto
- Livio Tesconi
- Antonio Casoar
- Gian Carlo Casalini
- Sergio Tagliapietra
- Arrigo Menicocci
- Vincenzo Rubolotta
