= Garth Manton =

Australian rower (1929–2024)

Personal information
- Nationality: Australian
- Born: 16 December 1929 Darling Point, Australia
- Died: 1 February 2024 (aged 94) Melbourne, Australia
- Education: Geelong Grammar School

Sport
- Country: Australia
- Sport: Rowing
- Club: Mercantile Rowing Club

Achievements and titles
- Olympic finals: Men's eight Melbourne 1956
- National finals: King's Cup 1954-56
Medal record
Representing Australia
Men's rowing
Bronze medal – third place	1956 Melbourne	Eight

Garth O. V. Manton (16 December 1929 – 1 February 2024) was an Australian representative rower. He was twice a national champion and won a bronze medal in the Australian Men's eight at the 1956 Summer Olympics.

== Rowing career ==
Manton was educated at Geelong Grammar School where he took up rowing. His senior rowing was with the Mercantile Rowing Club in Melbourne.

Manton first made state selection for Victoria in the five seat of the senior men's eight which contested and won the King's Cup at the 1954 Australian Interstate Regatta. He made two further King's Cup appearances for Victoria in 1955 (silver), and in 1956 for another gold medal win.

For the 1956 Melbourne Olympics, the winning King's Cup Victorian eight was selected as the Australian men's eight, except for Benfield from New South Wales in the 3 seat. Manton rowed in the five seat of the eight, which finished third behind the United States and Canadian crews, winning the bronze medal.

From 1991 to 2010, Manton was the President of the Angelsea Recreation and Sports Club. In 2010, he was inducted to the Victorian Rowing Hall of Fame.

== Death ==
Manton died in Melbourne on 1 February 2024, at the age of 94.
