= Zdeněk Žára =

Czechoslovak rower

Personal information
- Born: 1932
- Died: 2002 (aged 69–70)

Sport
- Sport: Rowing
Medal record
Men's rowing
Representing Czechoslovakia
European Rowing Championships
| Gold medal – first place | 1956 Bled | Eight |
| Bronze medal – third place | 1957 Duisburg | Eight |

Zdeněk Žára (3 March 1932 – 16 November 2002) was a rower who represented Czechoslovakia. He competed at the 1956 European Rowing Championships in Bled, Yugoslavia, with the men's eight where they won the gold medal. The same team went to the 1956 Summer Olympics in Melbourne with the men's eight where they were eliminated in the semi-final.
