= Livio Tesconi =

Italian rower

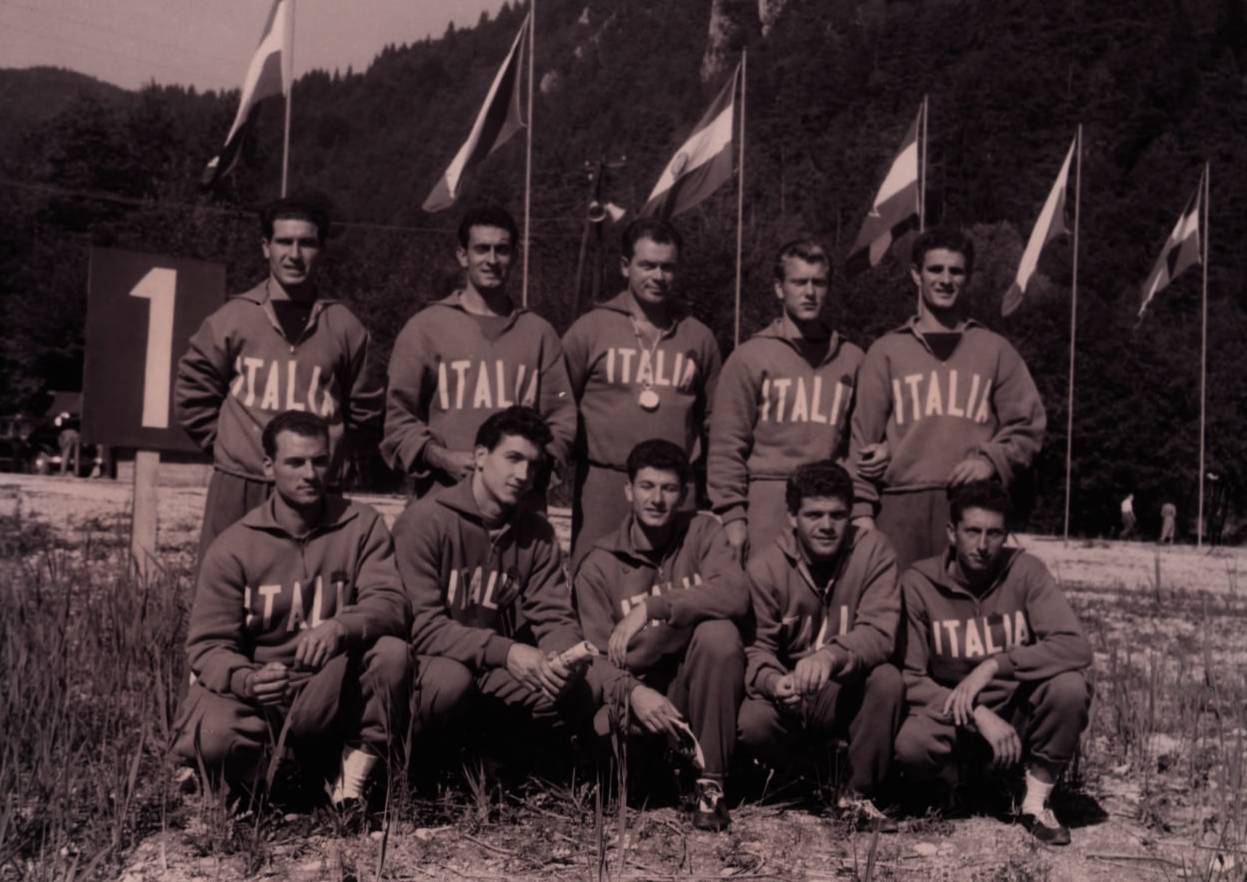

Personal information
- Nationality: Italian
- Born: 15 September 1935
- Died: 18 March 2004 (aged 68)

Sport
- Sport: Rowing

Livio Tesconi (15 September 1935 – 18 March 2004) was an Italian rower. He competed in the men's eight event at the 1956 Summer Olympics.

== See also ==
- Antonio Amato
- Salvatore Nuvoli
- Cosimo Campioto
- Antonio Casoar
- Gian Carlo Casalini
- Sergio Tagliapietra
- Arrigo Menicocci
- Vincenzo Rubolotta
