= Richard Duc =

French rower

Personal information
- Born: 29 October 1934
- Died: 5 June 2012 (aged 77)

Sport
- Sport: Rowing
Medal record
Men's rowing
Representing France
European Rowing Championships
| Silver medal – second place | 1956 Bled | Eight |

Richard Duc (29 October 1934 – 5 June 2012) was a French rower.

Duc was born in 1934. He competed at the 1956 European Rowing Championships in Bled, Yugoslavia, with the men's eight where they won the silver medal. The same team went to the 1956 Summer Olympics in Melbourne with the men's eight where they were eliminated in the round one heat.
