= René Massiasse =

French rower

Personal information
- Born: 1934 (age 91–92)

Sport
- Sport: Rowing
Medal record
Men's rowing
Representing France
European Rowing Championships
Silver medal – second place	1956 Bled	Eight

René Massiasse (born 1934) is a French rower.

Massiasse was born in 1934. He competed at the 1956 European Rowing Championships in Bled, Yugoslavia, with the men's eight where they won the silver medal. The same team went to the 1956 Summer Olympics in Melbourne with the men's eight where they were eliminated in the round one heat.
