= Kenneth Masser =

British rower

Personal information
- Nationality: British
- Born: 29 April 1933 (age 91)

Sport
- Sport: Rowing

Kenneth "Bill" Masser (born 29 April 1933) is a British rower. He competed in the men's eight event at the 1956 Summer Olympics in Melbourne, Australia.
