= Arrigo Menicocci =

Italian rower

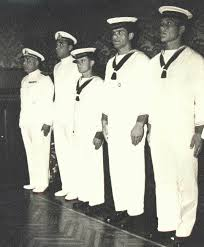

Personal information
- Nationality: Italian
- Born: 5 October 1933; Rome, Italy
- Died: 1 December 1956 (aged 23); Melbourne, Victoria, Australia

Sport
- Sport: Rowing

Arrigo Menicocci (5 October 1933 – 1 December 1956) was an Italian rower. He competed in the men's eight event at the 1956 Summer Olympics. He was killed in a road accident while at the Olympics in Melbourne.

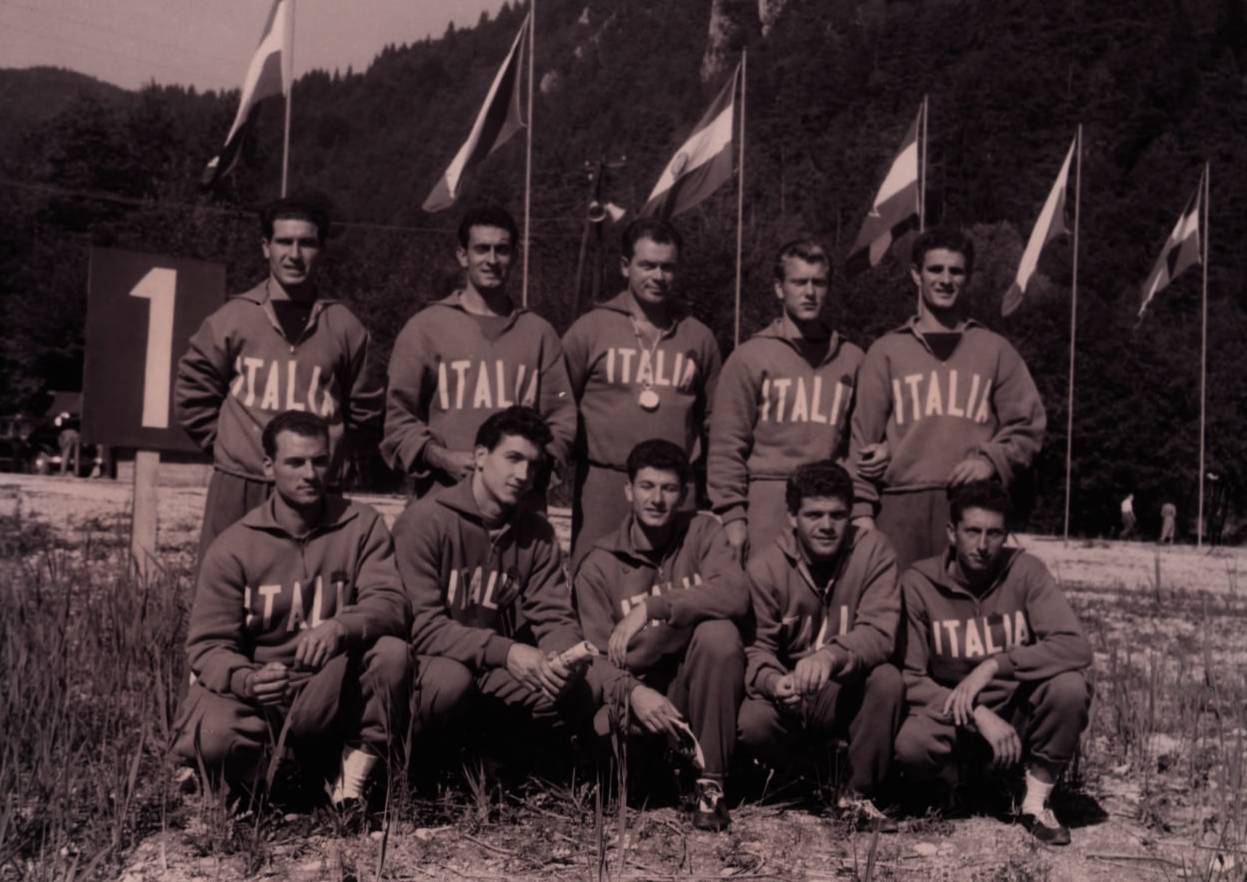

== See also ==
- Antonio Amato
- Salvatore Nuvoli
- Cosimo Campioto
- Livio Tesconi
- Antonio Casoar
- Gian Carlo Casalini
- Sergio Tagliapietra
- Vincenzo Rubolotta
