= Maurice Bas =

French rower (born 1935)

Personal information
- Born: 28 May 1935 (age 91)

Sport
- Sport: Rowing
Medal record
Men's rowing
Representing France
European Rowing Championships
Silver medal – second place	1956 Bled	Eight

Maurice Bas (born 28 May 1935) is a French rower.

Bas was born in 1935. He competed at the 1956 European Rowing Championships in Bled, Yugoslavia, with the men's eight where they won the silver medal. The same team went to the 1956 Summer Olympics in Melbourne with the men's eight where they were eliminated in the round one heat.
