= Masao Hara =

Japanese rower (born 1935)

Personal information
- Nationality: Japanese
- Born: 1935 (age 89–90)

Sport
- Sport: Rowing

Masao Hara (born 1935) is a Japanese rower. He competed in the men's eight event at the 1956 Summer Olympics.
