= Imre Kemény =

Hungarian rower

Personal information
- Born: 24 August 1931 Budapest, Hungary
- Died: 11 May 2024 (aged 92)

Sport
- Sport: Rowing
Medal record
Men's rowing
Representing Hungary
European Championships
Bronze medal – third place	1956 Bled	Eight

Imre Kemény (24 August 1931 – 11 May 2024) was a Hungarian rower. He competed at the 1952 Summer Olympics in Helsinki with the men's coxless four where they were eliminated in the round one repêchage.
