= Édouard Leguery =

French rower (1934–1986)

Personal information
- Born: 8 August 1934 France
- Died: 16 February 1986 (aged 51)

Sport
- Sport: Rowing
Medal record
Men's rowing
Representing France
European Rowing Championships
Bronze medal – third place	1955 Ghent	Coxed pair
Silver medal – second place	1956 Bled	Eight

Édouard Leguery (8 August 1934 – 16 February 1986) was a French rower. He competed at the 1956 Summer Olympics in Melbourne with the men's eight where they were eliminated in the round one heat.
