= Salvatore Nuvoli =

Italian rower

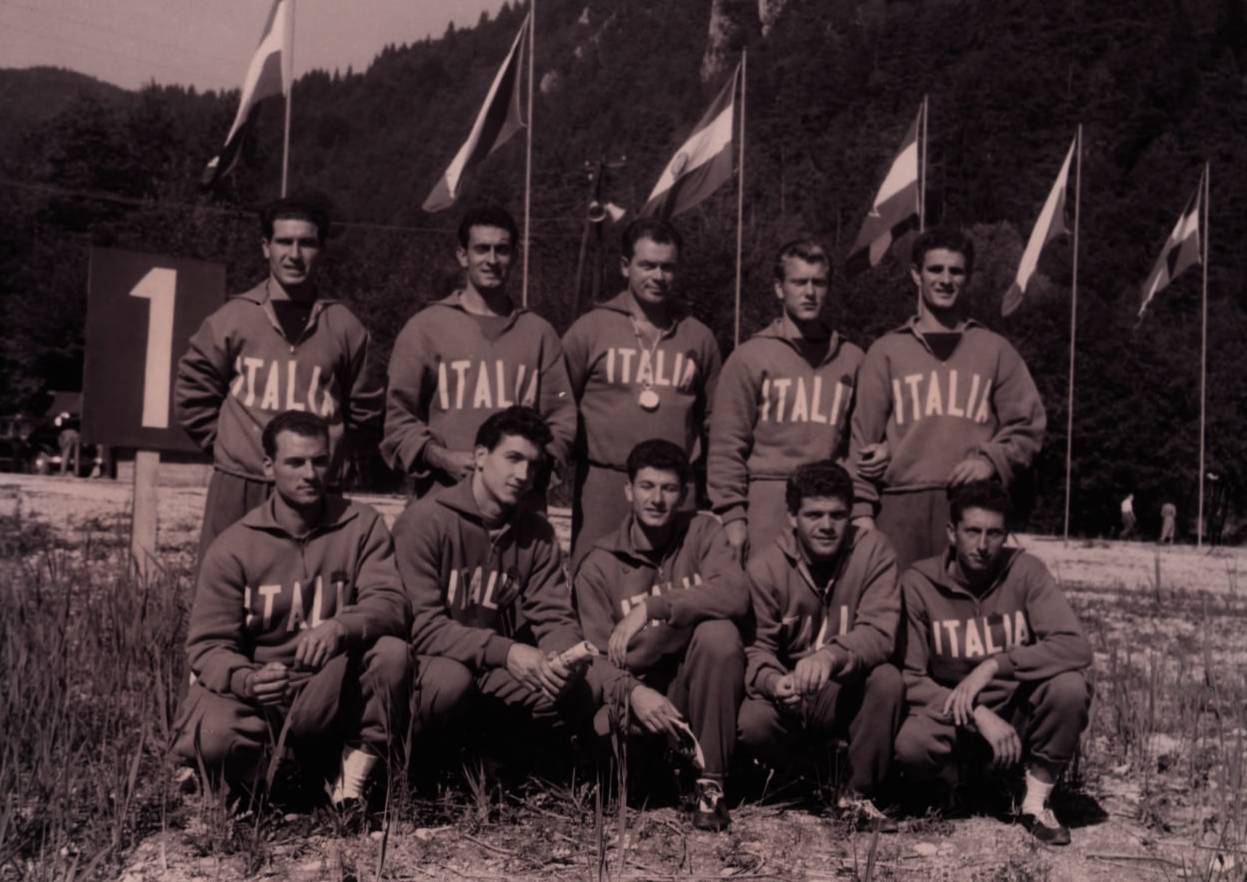

Personal information
- Nationality: Italian
- Born: 23 March 1935; Porto Torres, Italy
- Died: 28 October 2010 (aged 75)

Sport
- Sport: Rowing

Salvatore Nuvoli (23 March 1935 – 28 October 2010) was an Italian rower. He competed in the men's eight event at the 1956 Summer Olympics.

== See also ==
- Antonio Amato
- Cosimo Campioto
- Livio Tesconi
- Antonio Casoar
- Gian Carlo Casalini
- Sergio Tagliapietra
- Arrigo Menicocci
- Vincenzo Rubolotta
