= Michael Aikman (rower) =

Australian rower (1933–2005)

Personal information
- Full name: Alexander Michael Hirst Aikman
- Born: 9 September 1933 Geelong, Victoria, Australia
- Died: 16 February 2005 (aged 71) Malvern, Victoria, Australia

Sport
- Sport: Rowing
- Club: Melbourne University Boat Club
Medal record
Men's rowing
Representing Australia
Olympic Games
| Bronze medal – third place | 1956 Melbourne | Eight |

Alexander Michael Hirst Aikman (9 September 1933 – 16 February 2005) was an Australian rower (an Olympic medal winner at the 1956 Melbourne Olympics) and educationalist.

== Rowing ==
Aikman was educated at Geelong College between 1939-1951 as a 'day boy' (ie not a boarder), where he excelled academically, in sport (athletics, football, and rowing), and the performing arts (winning the Music Prize). He rowed in the First VIII boat at the 1950 Head of the River schoolboys' regatta, which boat (also notable for being coxed by future politician John Button) won the 'Loser's Final'. Aikman was Captain of Boats (ie rowing) in his final year at Geelong College, rowing in the Head of the River a second time.

Whilst a student at the University of Melbourne, Aikman rowed for Ormond College, the University's First VIII, and the Victorian King’s Cup crew (who won in 1956).

In 1956 for the Melbourne Olympics the winning Kings Cup Victorian eight was selected as the Australian men's eight excepting for the 3 seat – Benfield from New South Wales. Aikman rowed in the bow seat of the Australian crew in their Olympic campaign to a thrilling final where the Australian boat took it to the US and Canadian crews and came away with a bronze medal in the eights event.

Aikman remained involved in rowing as a coach at the various schools at which he taught, as well as at Hawthorn Rowing Club (in 1960).

Aikman was a runner in the 2000 Sydney Olympics torch relay.

In 2010, Aikman was inducted as a member of the Rowing Victoria Hall of Fame.

== Teaching career ==
Aikman completed a Bachelor of Science and later a Bachelor of Education at the University of Melbourne.

He taught sciences at Camberwell High School from 1956-1959, and chemistry at Scotch College (Melbourne) in 1960-1961, before becoming the Head of Chemistry and a boarding house master at Trinity Grammar, Sydney in 1962.

From 1966 until 1973, Aikman was headmaster at The Scots School in Bathurst, New South Wales.

In 1974, Aikman was appointed headmaster (later styled 'Principal') of Haileybury College, Melbourne. He remained at Haileybury until his retirement in 1998. During his time at Haileybury, he led a major building programme at the school's Keysborough campus (which had only been established in 1963), including the 'Great Hall', the aquatic centre, and the chapel (designed by Philip Cox, with windows and murals by Leonard French). Aikman was passionate about music and the performing arts, "mov[ing] to make music and drama central to activities at [Haileybury]" by establishing the student orchestra and concert band, expanding the drama department and promoting the school play, and instituting the biennial Tattoo (variety show), in which Aikman (who had "a fine baritone voice) himself would often perform as part of the "(in)famous" 'Chalkdusters' (a singing ensemble of Haileybury staff). Aikman was fond of the operettas of Gilbert and Sullivan.

== Death and legacy ==
Aikman died in 2005. His funeral was held in the chapel at Haileybury, whose construction he had overseen. Acknowledging Aikman's commitment to, and promotion of, music and the performing arts, the 'Great Hall' at Haileybury was renamed the 'Aikman Hall'; similarly, there is also an 'Aikman Hall' at The Scots School, Bathurst.
