= Jim Howden (rower) =

Australian rower

James Howden
Personal information
- Nationality: Australian
- Born: 4 September 1934
- Died: 10 October 1993 (aged 59)
- Education: Geelong Grammar; Melbourne University

Sport
- Country: Australia
- Sport: Rowing
- Club: Yarra Yarra Rowing Club; MUBC

Achievements and titles
- Olympic finals: Men's eight Melbourne 1956
- National finals: King's Cup 1956, 59-60
Medal record
Representing Australia
Men's rowing
Bronze medal – third place	1956 Melbourne	Eight

James Guthrie Howden (4 September 1934 – 10 October 1993) was an Australian representative rower who won a bronze medal at the 1956 Summer Olympics and represented at the 1962 World Rowing Championships.

== Rowing career ==
=== Club and state ===
Howden was raised in Point Lonsdale in Victoria, Australia. He was educated at Geelong Grammar School where he took up rowing and at Ormond College at the University of Melbourne. His senior rowing was with the Yarra Yarra Rowing Club, the Melbourne University Boat Club. In later life he joined the Mercantile Rowing Club.

He first made state selection for Victoria in 1956 in the men's eight which contested and won the King's Cup at the annual Australian Interstate Regatta. He raced in two further Victorian King's Cup eights in 1959 and 1960.

=== International representative ===
In 1956 for the Melbourne Olympics the winning Kings Cup Victorian eight was selected as the Australian men's eight excepting for the 3 seat – Benfield from New South Wales. Howden rowed in the four seat of the Australian eight in their Olympic campaign to a thrilling final where the Australian eight took it to the US and Canadian crews and came away with a bronze medal.

In 1962 Howden was the stroke of a Victorian coxed four which was selected to race for Australia at the inaugural World Rowing Championships in Lucerne. They placed fifth overall.

=== Selector ===
Howden was an Australian rowing team selector from 1976 to 1980. He was on selection panels for squads for the Montreal 1976 and the Moscow 1980 Olympics and the 1977,1978 and 1979 World Rowing Championships. He was the Rowing Australia Chairman of Selectors in 1979 when the decision was made to appoint a full-time national coach in Reinhold Batschi.

== Professional career and personal ==
Howden was a lawyer and was appointed as a Victorian County Court judge in 1985. He was diagnosed with melanoma in 1986 and died from it in 1993.
