= Vincenzo Rubolotta =

Italian rower

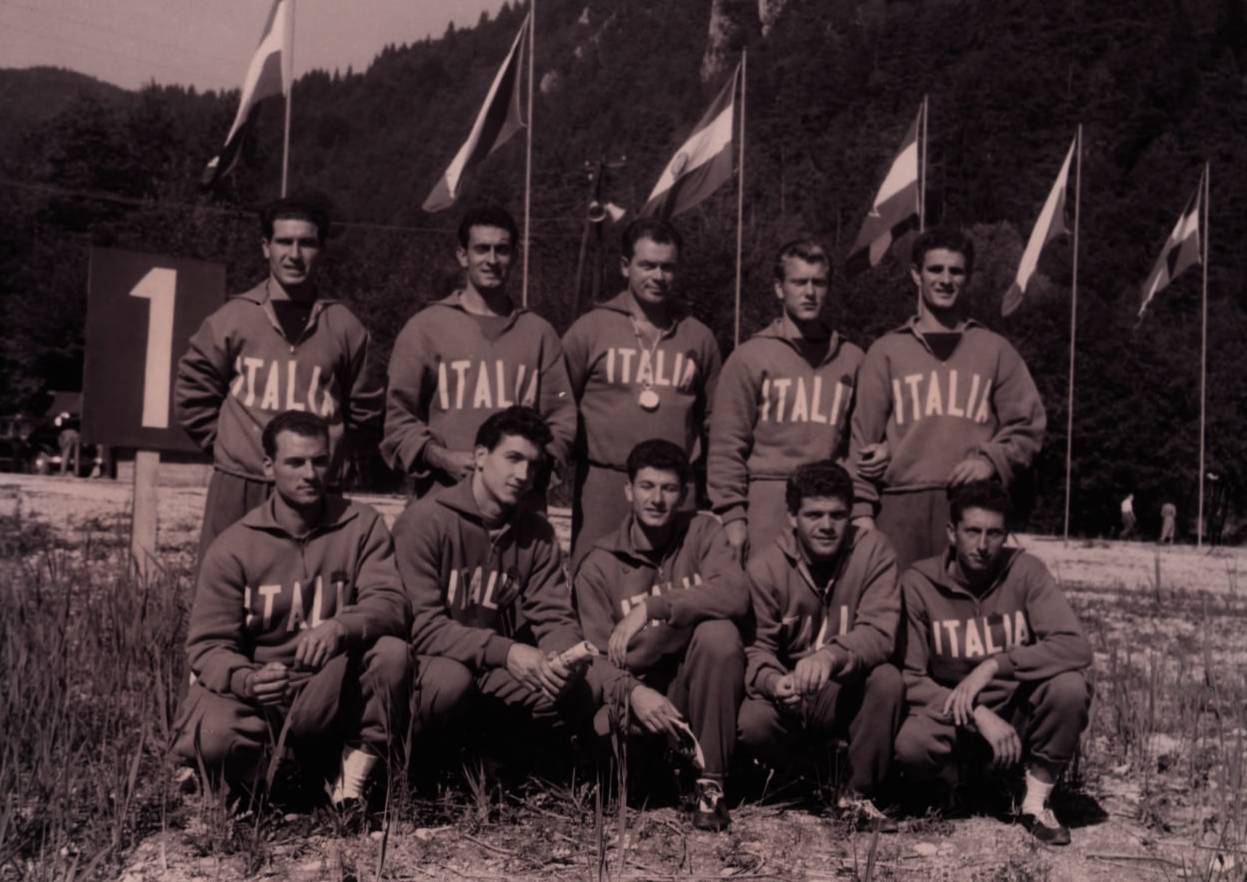

Personal information
- Nationality: Italian
- Born: 21 November 1913
- Died: 7 November 2003 (aged 89)

Sport
- Sport: Rowing

Vincenzo Rubolotta (21 November 1913 – 7 November 2003) was an Italian rower. He competed in the men's eight event at the 1956 Summer Olympics.

== See also ==
- Antonio Amato
- Salvatore Nuvoli
- Cosimo Campioto
- Livio Tesconi
- Antonio Casoar
- Gian Carlo Casalini
- Sergio Tagliapietra
- Arrigo Menicocci
