= Jane Brown Grimes =

Tennis administrator (1941–2021)

- Born: January 20, 1941 New York City, New York, U.S.
- Died: November 2, 2021 (aged 80)
- Int. Tennis HoF: 2014 (member page)
- Spouse: Charles Grimes
- Children: 3

Jane Brown Grimes (born Trowbridge Gillespie; January 20, 1941 – November 2, 2021) was President of the United States Tennis Association from 2007 to 2008. Her tenure made Brown Grimes the second female president in USTA history. Brown Grimes was inducted into the International Tennis Hall of Fame in 2014.

== Early life and education ==
Jane Trowbridge Gillespie was born on January 20, 1941, in New York City, New York. After graduating from Wellesley College in 1962, she went to the Zicklin School of Business to earn a Master of Business Administration degree. Brown Grimes studied international relations at the University of Cambridge.

== Career ==
Brown Grimes started her career working at Life as a reporter. In 1977, she moved to tennis to start a New York City branch of the International Tennis Hall of Fame. With the ITHF, she was named executive director in 1981 before leaving to work for the Women's Tennis Council in 1986. During her time with the WTC, she was managing director from 1986 to 1991. In 1991, Brown Grimes returned to the ITHF and became president from 1991 to 2000.

In 2000, Brown Grimes began her executive career with the United States Tennis Association. Brown Grimes was the First Vice President in 2005 before being promoted to president in 2007. When she became president, Brown Grimes was the second woman in USTA history to hold the position. Brown Grimes remained as president until she was succeeded by Lucy S. Garvin in 2009.

== Honors ==
In 2014, Brown Grimes was inducted into the International Tennis Hall of Fame.

== Personal life and death ==
Brown Grimes was married to Olympic gold medallist Charles Grimes, who won gold at the 1956 Summer Olympics in rowing. She had three children. Grimes died in New York City on November 2, 2021.
