= Émile Clerc =

French rower

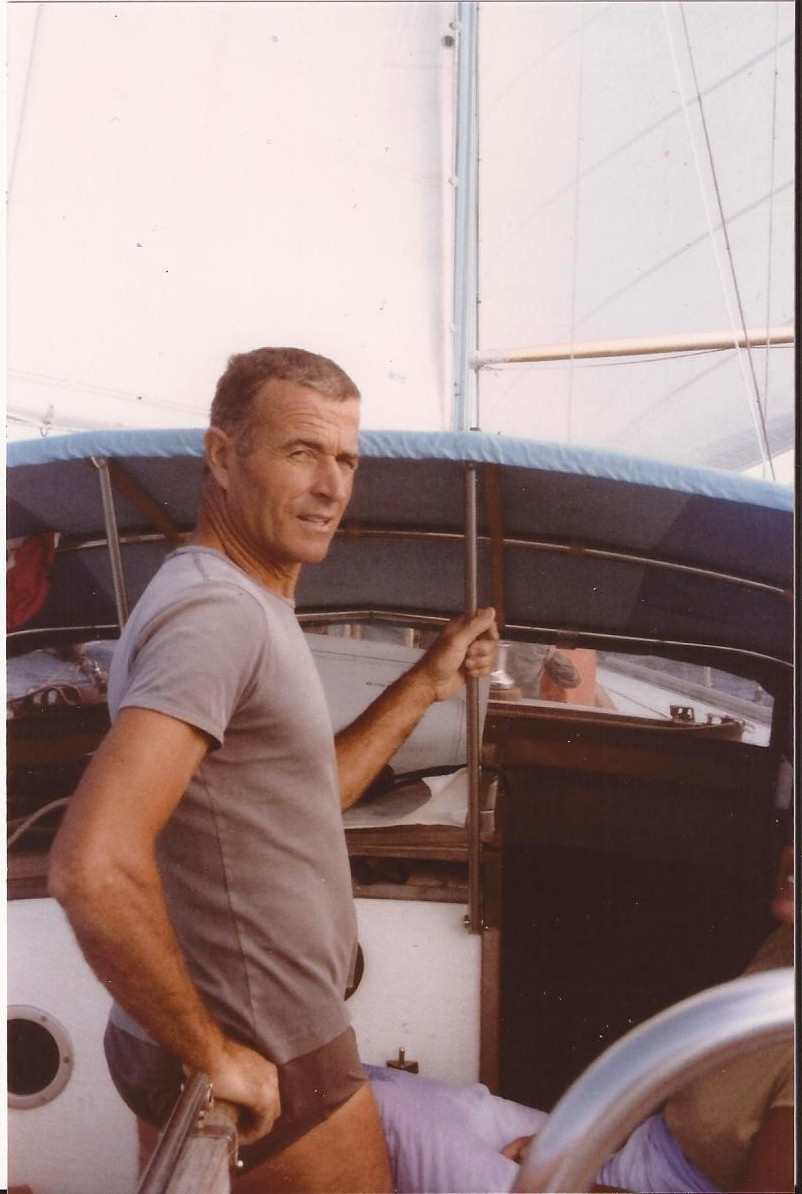

Personal information
- Born: 5 June 1934 (age 92) Thonon-les-Bains, France
- Height: 185 cm (6 ft 1 in)
- Weight: 76 kg (168 lb)

Sport
- Sport: Rowing
Medal record
Men's rowing
Representing France
World Rowing Championships
Bronze medal – third place	1962 Lucerne	Eight
European Rowing Championships
Silver medal – second place	1956 Bled	Eight
Bronze medal – third place	1961 Prague	Eight

Émile Clerc (born 5 June 1934) is a French rower. He competed at the 1956 Summer Olympics in Melbourne with the men's eight where they were eliminated in round one.
