= Toshiji Eda =

Japanese rower (born 1937)

Personal information
- Nationality: Japanese
- Born: 1937 (age 87–88)

Sport
- Sport: Rowing

Toshiji Eda (江田 利児, Eda Toshiji, born 1937) is a Japanese rower. He competed in the men's eight event at the 1956 Summer Olympics.
