= Josef Švec =

Czechoslovak rower (born 1935)

Personal information
- Born: 20 November 1935 (age 90)

Sport
- Sport: Rowing
Medal record
Men's rowing
Representing Czechoslovakia
European Championships
Gold medal – first place	1956 Bled	Eight
Bronze medal – third place	1957 Duisburg	Eight
Silver medal – second place	1959 Mâcon	Eight

Josef Švec (born 20 November 1935) is a Czechoslovak rower. He competed at the 1956 Summer Olympics in Melbourne with the men's eight where they were eliminated in the semi-final.
