= John A. Russell =

British rower (1933–2010)

Personal information
- Full name: John Alastair Legh Russell
- Nationality: British
- Born: 1 June 1933; Epsom, England
- Died: 22 May 2010 (aged 76); Crowborough, Sussex, England

Sport
- Sport: Rowing

John Alastair Legh Russell (1 June 1933 – 22 May 2010) was a British rower. He competed in the men's eight event at the 1956 Summer Olympics.
