= Jacques Vilcoq =

French rower

Personal information
- Born: 1942 (age 83–84)

Sport
- Sport: Rowing
Medal record
Men's rowing
Representing France
European Rowing Championships
Silver medal – second place	1956 Bled	Eight

Jacques Vilcoq (born 1942) is a French coxswain.

Vilcoq was born in 1942. He competed at the 1956 European Rowing Championships in Bled, Yugoslavia, with the men's eight where they won the silver medal. The same team went to the 1956 Summer Olympics in Melbourne with the men's eight where they were eliminated in the round one heat.
