= Josef Věntus =

Czech rower

Personal information
- Born: 17 February 1931 Kylešovice, Opava District, Czechoslovakia
- Died: 29 December 2001 (aged 70) Prague, Czech Republic

Sport
- Sport: Rowing
Medal record
Men's rowing
Representing Czechoslovakia
Bronze medal – third place	1960 Rome	Eight
Bronze medal – third place	1964 Tokyo	Eight
European Championships
Gold medal – first place	1956 Bled	Eight
Bronze medal – third place	1957 Duisburg	Eight
Bronze medal – third place	1963 Copenhagen	Eight

Josef Věntus (17 February 1931 – 29 December 2001) was a Czech rower who competed for Czechoslovakia in the 1956 Summer Olympics, in the 1960 Summer Olympics, and in the 1964 Summer Olympics.

== Life ==
Věntus was born in Kylešovice part of Opava on 17 February 1931. In 1956 he was a crew member of the Czechoslovak boat which was eliminated in the semi-finals of the eight event. Four years later he won the bronze medal with the Czechoslovak boat in the eights competition. At the 1964 Games, he won his second bronze medal as part of the Czechoslovak boat in the eights event.

Věntus died in Prague on 29 December 2001, at the age of 70.
