= Anatoly Antonov (rower) =

Russian rower

Personal information
- Born: 1934 (age 91–92)

Sport
- Sport: Rowing
Medal record
Men's rowing
Representing the Soviet Union
European Rowing Championships
Silver medal – second place	1957 Duisburg	Eight
Bronze medal – third place	1958 Poznań	Eight
Bronze medal – third place	1959 Mâcon	Eight

Anatoly Antonov (Russian: Анатолий Антонов; born 1934) is a Russian rower who represented the Soviet Union. He competed at the 1956 Summer Olympics in Melbourne with the men's eight where they were eliminated in the semi-final.
