= Eduard Antoch =

Czechoslovak rower (1932–2018)

Personal information
- Born: 26 December 1932
- Died: 8 March 2018 (aged 85) Schlier, Germany

Sport
- Sport: Rowing
Medal record
Men's rowing
Representing Czechoslovakia
European Rowing Championships
Gold medal – first place	1956 Bled	Eight

Eduard Antoch (26 December 1932 – 8 March 2018) was a Czechoslovak rower. He competed at the 1956 European Rowing Championships in Bled, Yugoslavia, with the men's eight where they won the gold medal. The same team went to the 1956 Summer Olympics in Melbourne with the men's eight where they were eliminated in the semi-final.
