= Harold Hewitt (rowing) =

Australian rowing cox

Neil Hewitt
Personal information
- Born: 9 September 1938

Sport
- Club: Mercantile Rowing Club

Achievements and titles
- Olympic finals: Melbourne 1956
- National finals: King's Cup 1955–1956
Medal record
Men's rowing
Representing Australia
Olympic Games
Bronze medal – third place	1956 Melbourne	Eight

Harold Neil Hewitt (born 2 September 1938) is an Australian former representative rowing coxswain. He was a Victorian state and Australian national champion who competed at the 1956 Summer Olympics where he won a bronze medal in the men's eight.

== Club and state rowing ==
His senior rowing was with the Mercantile Rowing Club in Melbourne. . He coxed the Mercantile men's senior eights which won the Victorian state championships in 1955 and 1956 and won the Tasmanian state championship in 1956. In 1956 he also coxed a Mercantile four to a state championship title.

He first made state selection for Victoria in 1955 in the men's eight contesting the King's Cup at the annual Australian Interstate Regatta. He was also in the stern of the 1956 Victorian King's Cup eight and steered that crew to victory.

== International representative rowing ==
In 1956 for the Melbourne Olympics the winning Kings Cup Victorian eight was selected as the Australian men's eight excepting for the 3 seat – Benfield from New South Wales. Hewitt steered the Australian eight in their Olympic campaign to a thrilling final where the Australian eight took it to the US and Canadian crews and came away with a bronze medal.
