= Jan Švéda =

Czech rower

Personal information
- Born: 5 November 1931 Břeclav, Czechoslovakia
- Died: 14 December 2007 (aged 76)

Sport
- Sport: Rowing
Medal record
Men's rowing
Representing Czechoslovakia
Olympic Games
Bronze medal – third place	1960 Rome	Eight
European Championships
Gold medal – first place	1956 Bled	Eight
Bronze medal – third place	1957 Duisburg	Eight
Silver medal – second place	1959 Mâcon	Eight

Jan Švéda (5 November 1931 – 14 December 2007) was a Czech rower who competed for Czechoslovakia in the 1956 Summer Olympics and in the 1960 Summer Olympics.

He was born in Břeclav. In 1956, he was a crew member of the Czechoslovak boat which was eliminated in the semi-finals of the eight event. Four years later he won the bronze medal with the Czechoslovak boat in the eights competition.
