= Simon Tozer =

British rower

Personal information
- Nationality: British
- Born: 24 December 1933 Fulham, England
- Died: February 5, 2003 (aged 69) Colchester, England

Sport
- Sport: Rowing

Simon Tozer (24 December 1933 –5 February 2003) was a British rower. He competed in the men's eight event at the 1956 Summer Olympics.
