= Ian Welsh (rower) =

British rower (1933–2013)

Personal information
- Nationality: British
- Born: 10 March 1933; Birmingham, England
- Died: 2 July 2013 (aged 80)

Sport
- Sport: Rowing

Ian William Welsh (10 March 1933 – 2 July 2013) was a British rower. He competed in the men's eight event at the 1956 Summer Olympics. Welsh died on 2 July 2013, at the age of 80.
