= Charles Grimes (rower) =

American rower

Medal record

Men's rowing

Representing the United States

Olympic Games
Gold medal – first place	1956 Melbourne	Men's eight

Charles Livingston Grimes (July 9, 1935 – February 5, 2007) was an American competition rower and Olympic champion.

== Early life ==
Born in Washington, D.C., Grimes was the son of Charles Pennebaker Grimes and Louise Davis Ireland Grimes. He was prepared at Groton School. He graduated from Yale University in 1957 and had an LL.B. from Harvard Law.

He played varsity football and basketball at Yale. Grimes accelerated his four-year course of study, graduating halfway through his senior year. He attended Christ Church, Oxford, for one year after Yale.

== Career ==
Grimes competed at the 1956 Summer Olympics in Melbourne, where he won a gold medal in eights with the American rowing team.

Grimes was physically imposing and powered the 1956 gold medal Olympic crew in Melbourne where he pulled so much water on his side that there was a problem balancing the boat. That team was the last university team to bring home the gold.

== Later life ==
"Grimes graduated from Yale in 1957 and from Harvard Law School in 1960. After a brief law career, he worked as an independent financial advisor and investor."

Grimes was also the plaintiff in the Grimes v. Donald, 673 A.2d 1207 (Del. 1996), one of the landmark Delaware corporations cases.

His wife Jane Brown Grimes is the second female chairperson and President of the USTA. They had no children.
