= Thomas Charlton (rower) =

American rower (born 1934)

Personal information
- Full name: Thomas Jackson Charlton Jr.
- Born: July 12, 1934 (age 92) Savannah, Georgia, U.S.
Medal record
Men's rowing
Representing the United States
Olympic Games
| Gold medal – first place | 1956 Melbourne | Eight |

Thomas Jackson Charlton Jr. (born July 12, 1934) is an American competition rower and Olympic champion.

Born in Savannah, Georgia, he won a gold medal in eights with the American team at the 1956 Summer Olympics in Melbourne. The eight rowers were Yale undergraduates. Charlton was a member of the Class of 1956. He commissioned through Yale Naval ROTC into the U.S. Marine Corps.
