= David Helliwell =

Canadian rower (1935–1993)

Olympic medal record

Men's rowing
Silver medal – second place	1956 Melbourne	Eight

David Leedom Helliwell (July 26, 1935 – December 30, 1993) was a Canadian rower who competed in the 1956 Summer Olympics. He won a silver medal in an eight alongside Philip Kueber, Richard McClure, Douglas McDonald, Bill McKerlich, Carlton Ogawa, Donald Pretty, Lawrence West, and Robert Wilson. He also won a silver medal in the 1958 Commonwealth Games in Australia but this time in a coxed four. He was born in Vancouver.
