= Liptovský Peter =

- Municipality
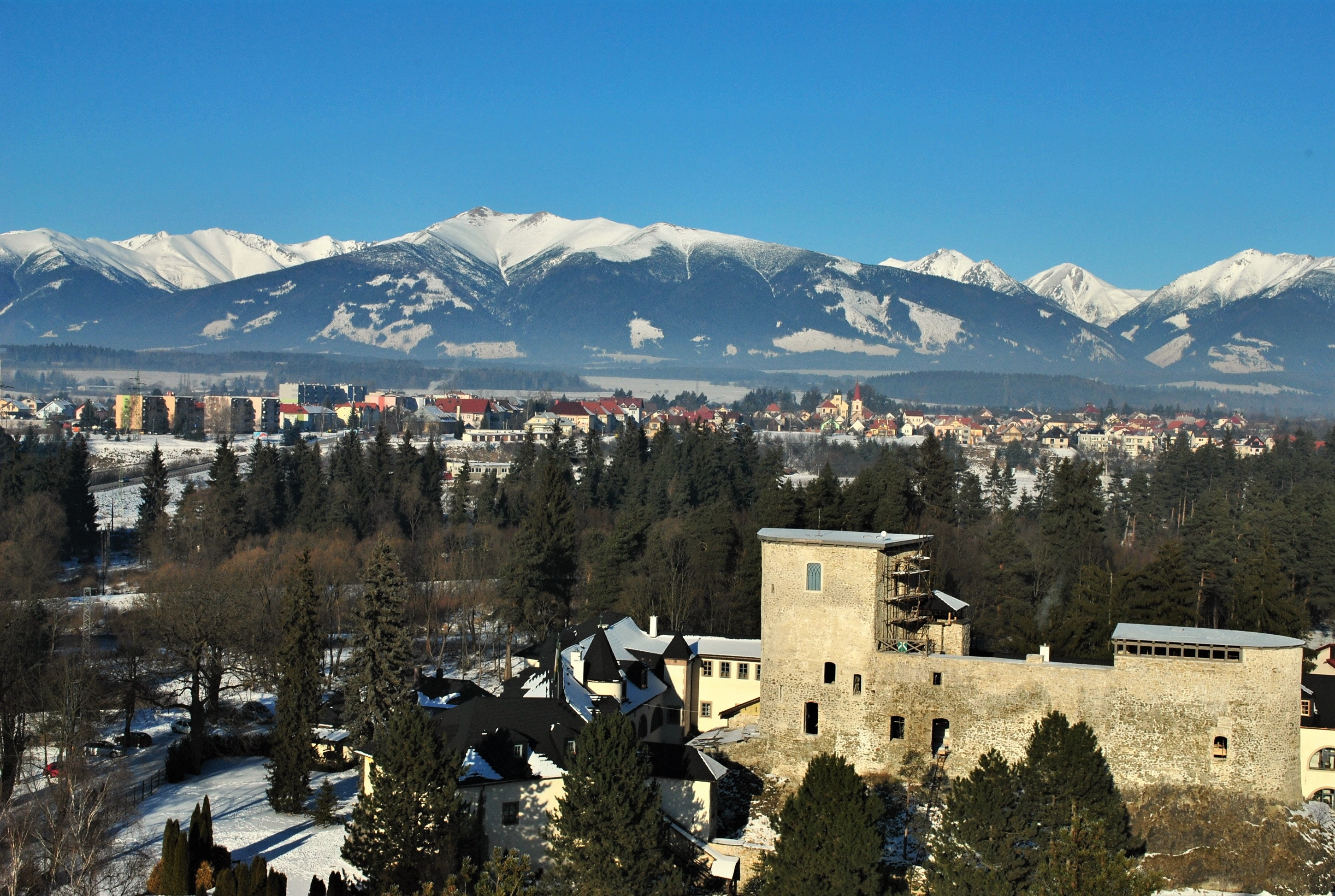
- View on Liptovský Peter. Liptovský Hrádok in the foreground

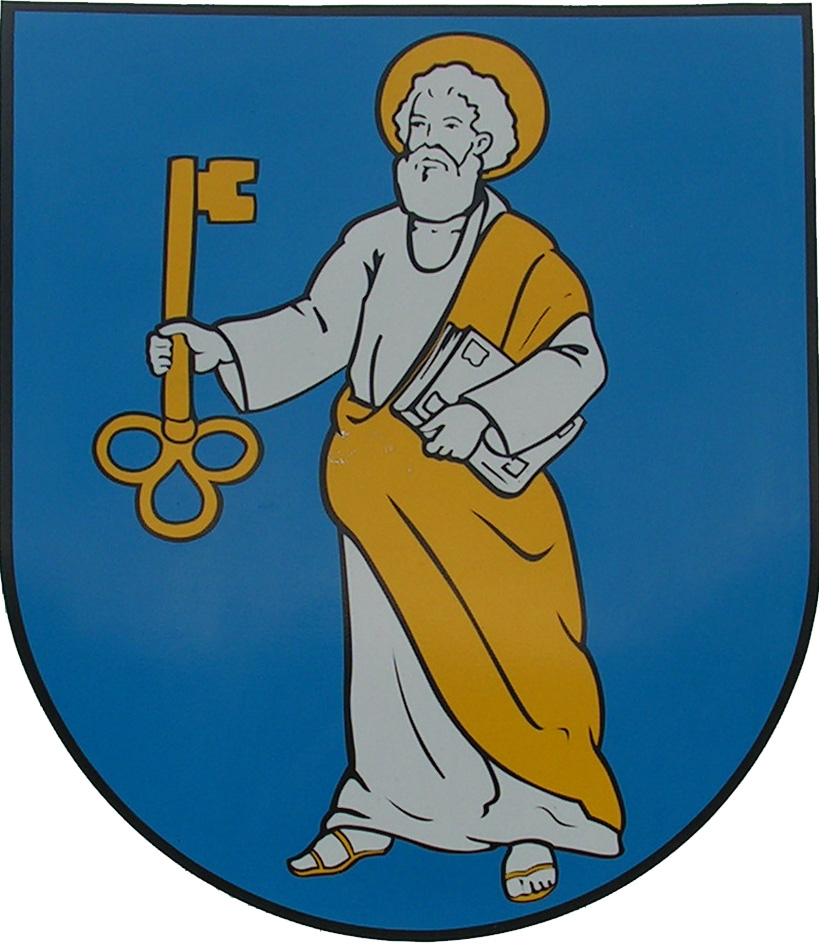
- Flag Coat of arms

- Location of Liptovský Peter in the Žilina Region Location of Liptovský Peter in Slovakia
- Coordinates: 49.05°N 19.73°E
- Country: Slovakia
- Region: Žilina Region
- District: Liptovský Mikuláš District
- First mentioned: 1286

Area
  - Total: 6.12 km^{2} (2.36 sq mi)
- Elevation: 679 m (2,228 ft)

Population (2025)
  - Total: 1,254
- Time zone: UTC+1 (CET)
  - Summer (DST): UTC+2 (CEST)
- Postal code: 330 1
- Area code: +421 44
- Vehicle registration plate (until 2022): LM
- Website: www.liptovskypeter.sk

Liptovský Peter (Slovak pronunciation: [ˈliptɔwskiː ˈpeter], Hungarian: Szentpéter) is a village and municipality in Liptovský Mikuláš District in the Žilina Region of northern Slovakia.

== History ==
In historical records the village was first mentioned as Scentpeter in 1286. Before the establishment of independent Czechoslovakia in 1918, it was part of Liptó County within the Kingdom of Hungary. From 1939 to 1945, it was part of the Slovak Republic.

== Geography ==
The municipality lies at an altitude of 679 metres (2,228 ft) and covers an area of 6.12 km^{2} (2.36 sq mi) (2025).

== Population ==
Population statistic (10 years)
Year	1995	2005	2015	2025
Count	1378	1388	1372	1254
Difference		+0.72%	−1.15%	−8.60%

Population statistic
Year	2024	2025
Count	1265	1254
Difference		−0.86%

It has a population of 1254 people (31 December 2025).

=== Ethnicity ===
Census 2021 (1+ %)
Ethnicity	Number	Fraction
Slovak	1205	92.47%
Not found out	82	6.29%
Czech	20	1.53%
Romani	14	1.07%
Total	1303	

In year 2021 was 1303 people by ethnicity 1205 as Slovak, 82 as Not found out, 20 as Czech, 14 as Romani, 4 as Other, 3 as Rusyn, 2 as Hungarian, 1 as Irish, 1 as Russian, 1 as Polish and 1 as German.

Note on population: The difference values of population numbers in the table "Population statistic" and in the sections "Ethnicity" & "Religion" is caused by the use of various statistical methods.

=== Religion ===
Census 2021 (1+ %)
Religion	Number	Fraction
None	470	36.07%
Evangelical Church	384	29.47%
Roman Catholic Church	322	24.71%
Not found out	80	6.14%
Greek Catholic Church	14	1.07%
Total	1303	

In year 2021 was 1303 people by religion 470 from None, 384 from Evangelical Church, 322 from Roman Catholic Church, 80 from Not found out, 14 from Greek Catholic Church, 9 from Ad hoc movements, 7 from Jehovah's Witnesses, 4 from Other, 4 from Baptists Church, 3 from Other and not ascertained christian church, 2 from Bahá'i Community, 1 from Calvinist Church, 1 from Eastern Orthodox Church, 1 from Islam and 1 from Apostolic Church.
