= Philip Kueber =

Canadian rower

Olympic medal record

Men's rowing

Representing Canada
Silver medal – second place	1956 Melbourne	Eight

Philip Thomas Kueber (November 17, 1934 – November 23, 2009) was a Canadian Lawyer and Olympic rower, earning a silver medal in the 1956 Olympics in Melbourne, Australia. He was born in Galahad, Alberta and attended St. Edwards from 1946 to 1950. He received a law degree from the University of British Columbia in 1956. While at UBC, he joined the rowing team under the tutelage of Frank Read. In 1954 his team won a gold at the Commonwealth Games. In July 1955 they beat the Russians who had won the gold a year before.

== See also ==
- Rowing at the 1956 Summer Olympics
