= Junichi Kato (rower) =

Japanese rower (born 1935)

Personal information
- Nationality: Japanese
- Born: 17 November 1935 (age 89)

Sport
- Sport: Rowing

Junichi Kato (加藤 順一, Katō Jun'ichi, born 17 November 1935) is a Japanese former rower. He competed in the men's eight event at the 1956 Summer Olympics.
