= Donald Beer =

American rower (1935–1997)

Personal information
- Full name: Donald Andrew E. Beer
- Born: May 31, 1935; Manhattan, New York City, US
- Died: January 25, 1997 (aged 61); Princeton, New Jersey, US
- Resting place: Buried in Trinity All Saints Cemetery, Princeton, New Jersey
- Education: Yale University (BSE); Harvard University (MBA)
- Spouse: Nancy Gardner Beer (died 1997)

Sport
- Sport: Rowing

Donald Beer
Medal record

Men's rowing

Representing the United States

Olympic Games
Gold medal – first place	1956 Melbourne	Eight

Donald A. E. Beer (May 31, 1935 – January 25, 1997) was an American competition rower and Olympic champion.

He received a gold medal in eights with the American rowing team at the 1956 Summer Olympics in Melbourne. The eight rowers were Yale undergraduates. Beer was a member of the Class of 1957 for Yale with a major in electrical engineering, and graduated from Harvard Business School in 1959 with a master's degree in business administration.
