= Robert Wilson (Canadian rower) =

Canadian rower

Olympic medal record

Men's rowing
Silver medal – second place	1956 Melbourne	Eight

Robert Andrew Wilson (born October 14, 1935) is a Canadian rower who competed in the 1956 Summer Olympics.

He was born in Kamloops, BC.

In 1956 he was a crew member of the Canadian boat which won the silver medal in the eights event.
