= Rusty Wailes =

American rower (1936–2002)

Medal record

Men's rowing

Representing the United States

Olympic Games
Gold medal – first place	1956 Melbourne	Eight
Gold medal – first place	1960 Rome	Coxless four

Richard "Rusty" Donald Wailes, a.k.a. Perfect Oarsman (March 21, 1936 in Edmonds, Washington – October 11, 2002 on Lake Washington) was an American rower.

Wailes began sport rowing when he entered Yale University in the fall of 1954. Within two years he was part of the gold medal-winning eight-man U.S. team at the 1956 Summer Olympics in Melbourne. Wailes and his Yale teammates represented the United States in the 1956 Olympic team after defeating other collegiate teams in the eight-man Olympic trial. At the Olympic trials Wailes and his crewmates set a world record in 5 minutes, 52 seconds.

Wailes's crews defeated Harvard four consecutive years in the Harvard–Yale Regatta. Wailes was heavyweight crew captain his senior year. The athletic department bestowed upon Wailes the 1958 William Neely Mallory Award, the most prestigious athletic award given to a senior male at Yale.

Rusty earned again Olympic Gold as part of the four-man coxless crew at the 1960 Games in Rome. That team included John Sayre and two other rowers, Ayrault and Nash, from other colleges at the Lake Washington Rowing Club. They won the Pan American Games in 1959 and then went off to the Olympics in Rome.

Rusty, his wife, Lynne, and John Sayre, were a part of the original group, 'Sing-Out 65,' which became Up With People. John and Rusty, along with their respective wives, Pat Sayre and Lynne Wailes, had been members of the Moral Re-Armament show 'Space is so Startling' (recording year, 1962). Rusty then became Dean of Men at Mackinac College, which was located on the Mackinac Island site where Sing-Out had formed. Mackinac College was dedicated to training students who were 'Learning to Learn, Learning to Live, and Learning to Lead.'

On October 11, 2002, Rusty Wailes, who lived in Woodinville, WA, died of a heart attack while rowing on Lake Washington.
