= William Becklean =

American rower (born 1936)

Personal information
- Born: June 23, 1936 (age 90) Kansas City, Missouri, U.S.
Medal record
Men's rowing
Representing the United States
Olympic Games
Gold medal – first place	1956 Melbourne	Eight

William Becklean (born June 23, 1936) is an American competition rower and Olympic champion.

Becklean was born in Kansas City, Missouri, and attended Phillips Exeter Academy. He received a gold medal in eights with the American team at the 1956 Summer Olympics in Melbourne.

He would compete for Yale University and would receive an MBA from Harvard Business School.
