= Ernest Verbin =

Soviet rower

Personal information
- Born: 11 June 1934 (age 90)

Sport
- Sport: Rowing

Ernest Aleksandrovich Verbin (Russian: Эрнест Александрович Вербин; born 11 June 1934) is a Russian rower who represented the Soviet Union. He competed at the 1956 Summer Olympics in Melbourne with the men's eight where they were eliminated in the semi-final.
