= Robert Morey (rower) =

American rower (1936–2019)

Personal information
- Born: August 23, 1936 Cleveland, Ohio, U.S.
- Died: January 18, 2019 (aged 82)
Medal record
Men's rowing
Representing the United States
Olympic Games
Gold medal – first place	1956 Melbourne	Eight

Robert Willis "Jack" Morey Jr. (August 23, 1936 – January 18, 2019) was an American competition rower and Olympic champion. He was born in Cleveland, Ohio. He competed at the 1956 Summer Olympics in Melbourne, where he received a gold medal in the men's eight with the American team. He graduated from Yale University in 1958 and was a member of Skull and Bones. He served in the United States Navy aboard the icebreaker USS Atka as a lieutenant jg. and would later earn an MBA from Harvard Business School.
