= Sadahiro Sunaga =

Japanese rower (born 1934)

Personal information
- Nationality: Japanese
- Born: 19 November 1934 (age 90)

Sport
- Sport: Rowing

Sadahiro Sunaga (須永 定博, Sunaga Sadahiro, born 19 November 1934) is a Japanese rower. He competed in the men's eight event at the 1956 Summer Olympics.
