= Gösta Eriksson =

Swedish rower (1931–2024)

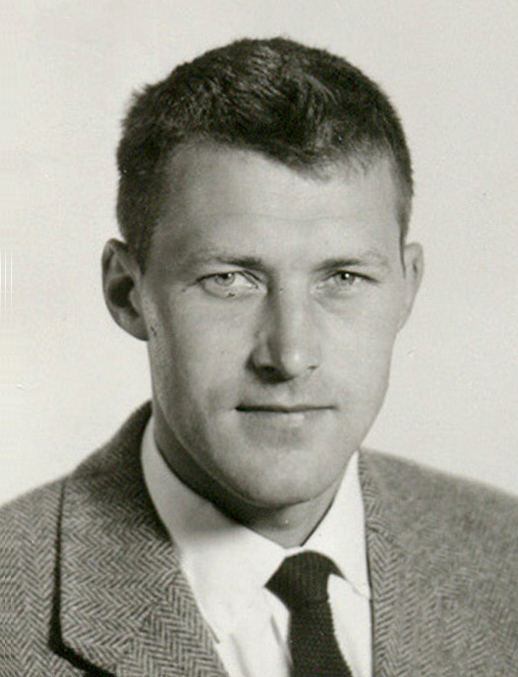
- Eriksson between 1956 and 1960

Personal information
- Born: 26 January 1931 Skee, Sweden
- Died: 21 August 2024 (aged 93) Trollhättan, Sweden

Sport
- Sport: Rowing
- Club: Roddklubben Three Towns; Trollhättans Roddsällskap
Medal record
Representing Sweden
Olympic Games
Silver medal – second place	1956 Melbourne	Coxed four
European Rowing Championships
Silver medal – second place	1955 Ghent	Coxed four
Silver medal – second place	1955 Ghent	Eight

Gösta Gunvald Eriksson (26 January 1931 – 21 August 2024) was a Swedish rower who competed in the 1956 and 1960 Summer Olympics.

== Early life ==
Eriksson was born on 26 January 1931, in Little Skee, Sweden, outside Strömstad.

== Career ==
=== Olympic Competitions ===
In the 1956 Summer Olympics, held in Melbourne, Australia and Stockholm, Sweden, he won a silver medal in the coxed four and finished fourth in the eight competition. Four years later, at the 1960 Summer Olympics, held in Rome, Italy, he and his partner Lennart Hansson were eliminated in the repechage of the coxed pair event and in the first round of the coxless pair competition.

=== European Championship ===
Eriksson won two more silver medals at the 1955 European Championships, in the coxed four and eight.

== Death ==
Eriksson died in Trollhättan on 21 August 2024, at the age of 93.
