= John Cooke (rower) =

American rower (1937–2005)

Medal record

Men's rowing

Representing the United States

Olympic Games
Gold medal – first place	1956 Melbourne	Eight

John Cooke (April 9, 1937 – December 26, 2005) was an American competition rower and Olympic champion.

He competed at the 1956 Summer Olympics in Melbourne, where he received a gold medal in eights with the American team.
