= Gian Carlo Casalini =

Italian rower (1934–2009)

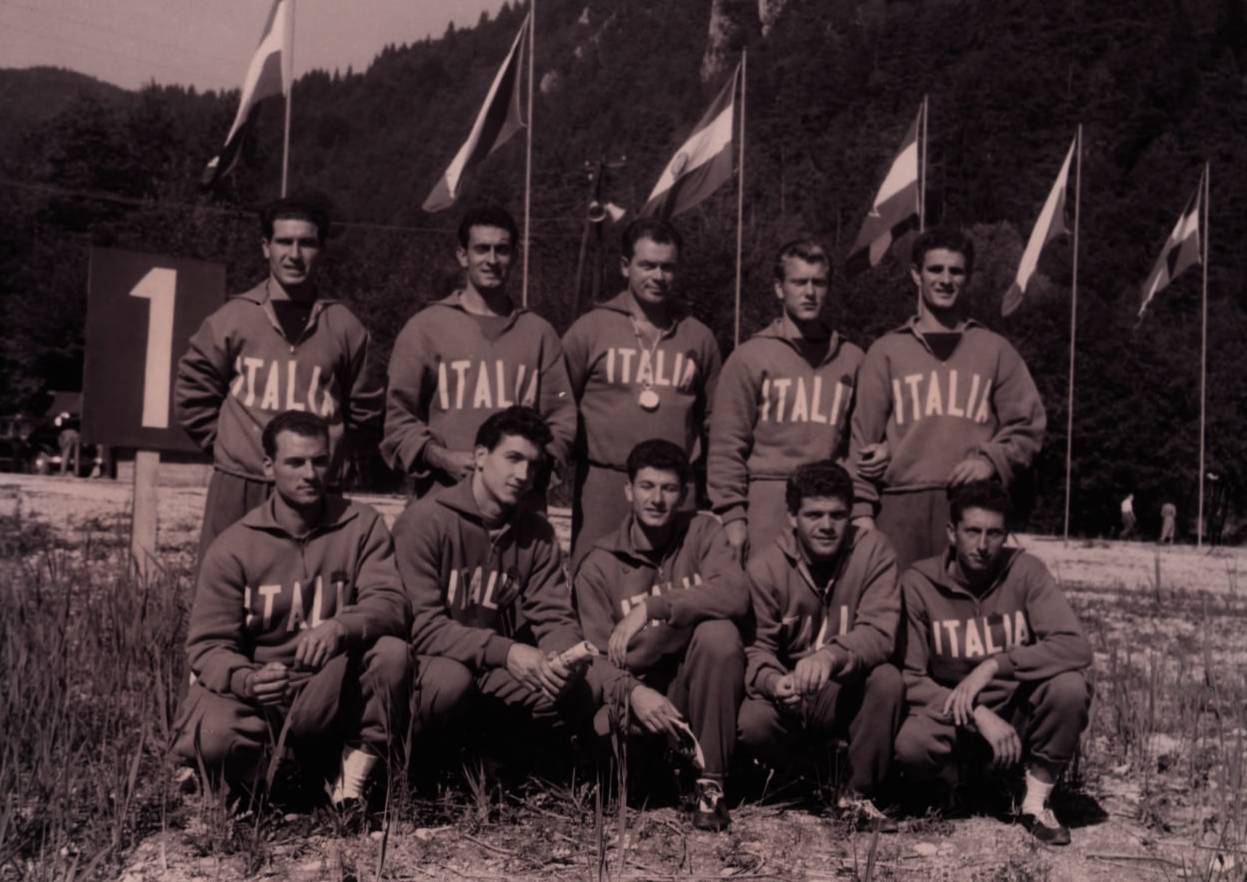

Personal information
- Nationality: Italian
- Born: 26 April 1934 Genoa, Italy
- Died: 9 February 2009 (aged 74)

Sport
- Sport: Rowing

Gian Carlo Casalini (26 April 1934 – 9 February 2009) was an Italian rower. He competed at the 1956 Summer Olympics and the 1960 Summer Olympics.

== See also ==
- Antonio Amato
- Salvatore Nuvoli
- Cosimo Campioto
- Livio Tesconi
- Antonio Casoar
- Sergio Tagliapietra
- Arrigo Menicocci
- Vincenzo Rubolotta
