= Wayne Pretty =

Canadian rower

Olympic medal record

Men's rowing
Silver medal – second place	1956 Melbourne	Eight

Donald Wayne Pretty (born June 11, 1936) is a Canadian rower who competed in the 1956 Summer Olympics and in the 1964 Summer Olympics.

In 1956 he was a crew member of the Canadian boat, winning the silver medal in the eights event. He was inducted to the British Columbia Sports Hall of Fame along with the rest of the 1956 UBC VRC Eights team in 1976.

Eight years later he finished ninth with the Canadian boat in the eight competition.
