= Sergio Tagliapietra =

Italian rower (1935–2022)

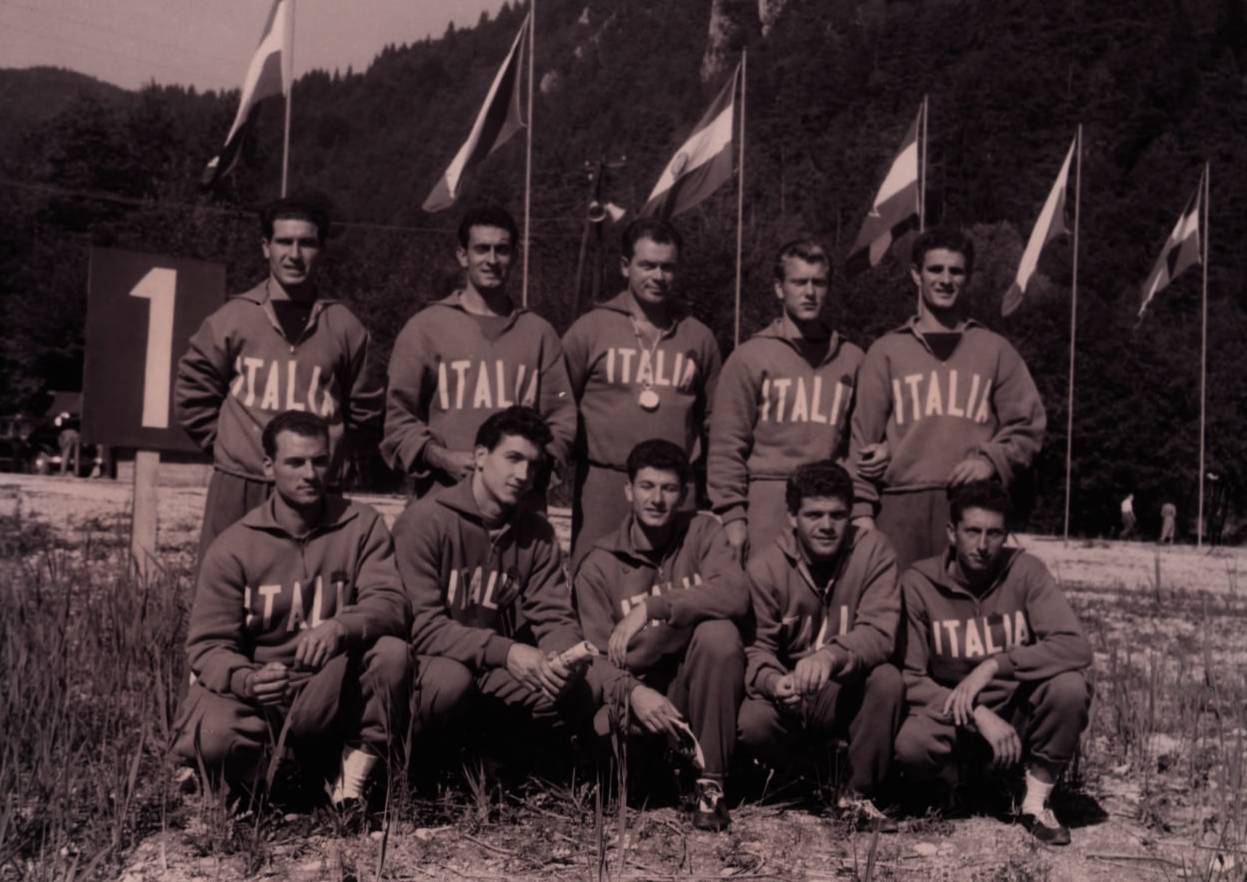

Personal information
- Nationality: Italian
- Born: 6 March 1935; Burano, Italy
- Died: 6 October 2022 (aged 87); Venice, Italy

Sport
- Sport: Rowing

Sergio Tagliapietra (6 March 1935 – 6 October 2022) was an Italian rower. He competed at the 1956 Summer Olympics and the 1964 Summer Olympics.

== See also ==
- Antonio Amato
- Salvatore Nuvoli
- Cosimo Campioto
- Livio Tesconi
- Antonio Casoar
- Gian Carlo Casalini
- Arrigo Menicocci
- Vincenzo Rubolotta
