= David Wight (rower) =

English-born American rower

David H. Wight
Personal information
- Full name: David Henry Wight
- Nationality: American
- Born: July 28, 1934 London, Great Britain
- Died: November 9, 2017 (aged 83)
Medal record
Men's rowing
Representing the United States
Olympic Games
Gold medal – first place	1956 Melbourne	Eight

David Henry "Dave" Wight (July 28, 1934, in London – November 9, 2017), was an American competition rower and Olympic champion.

He competed at the 1956 Summer Olympics in Melbourne, where he received a gold medal in eights with the American team.
