= Olle Larsson =

Swedish rower

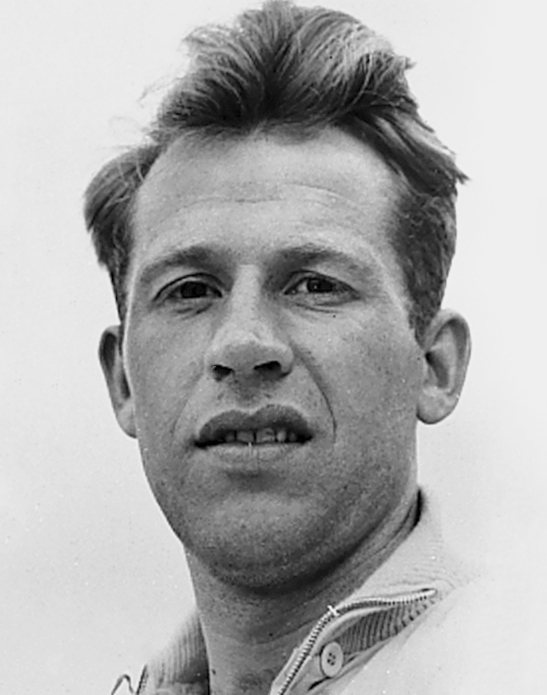

Personal information
- Born: 21 June 1928 Torsö, Sweden
- Died: 13 January 1960 (aged 31) Trollhättan, Sweden

Sport
- Sport: Rowing
- Club: Roddklubben Three Towns
Medal record
Representing Sweden
Olympic Games
| Silver medal – second place | 1956 Melbourne | Coxed four |
European Rowing Championships
| Silver medal – second place | 1955 Ghent | Coxed four |
| Silver medal – second place | 1955 Ghent | Eight |

Olof Hindrik "Olle" Larsson (21 June 1928 – 13 January 1960) was a Swedish rower who competed in the 1956 Summer Olympics. He won a silver medal in the coxed fours and finished fourth in the eights competition. He won two silver medals in these events at the 1955 European Championships.

Larsson was killed in an accident on a tugboat in Trollhättan. Since then a trophy in his honor is given to the national champions in the coxed fours.
