= Carlton Ogawa =

Canadian rower

Olympic medal record

Men's rowing
Silver medal – second place	1956 Melbourne	Eight

Carlton Susumi Ogawa (August 29, 1934 – September 23, 2006) was a Canadian rower who competed in the 1956 Summer Olympics. In 1956 he was the coxswain of the Canadian boat which won the silver medal in the eights event.
