= Lennart Hansson (rower) =

Swedish rower

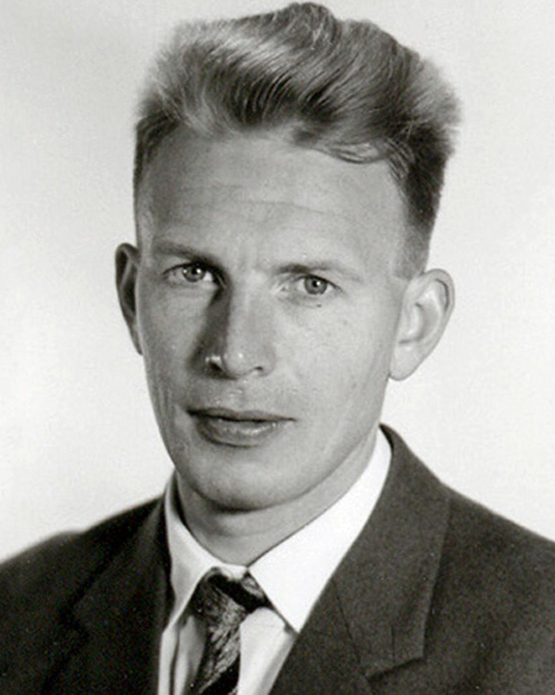

Personal information
- Born: 21 January 1931 Hogdal, Strömstad, Sweden
- Died: 1 March 2013 (aged 82) Trollhättan, Sweden

Sport
- Sport: Rowing
- Club: Roddklubben Three Towns; Uddevalla Roddklubb
Medal record
Representing Sweden
European Rowing Championships
Silver medal – second place	1955 Ghent	Eight
Bronze medal – third place	1959 Mâcon	Coxed four

Karl Sture Lennart Hansson (21 January 1931 – 1 March 2013) was a Swedish rower who won two medals at the European championships in 1955 and 1959, in the coxed fours and eights. He finished fourth in the eights at the 1956 Summer Olympics, and also competed at the 1960 Olympics in coxless and coxed pairs.
