= Lawrence West (rower) =

Canadian rower (born 1935)

Olympic medal record

Men's rowing
Silver medal – second place	1956 Melbourne	Eight

Lawrence Kingsley West (born 1935) is a Canadian rower who competed in the 1956 Summer Olympics.

In 1956 he was a crew member of the Canadian boat which won the silver medal in the eights event.
