= Ivar Aronsson =

Swedish rower

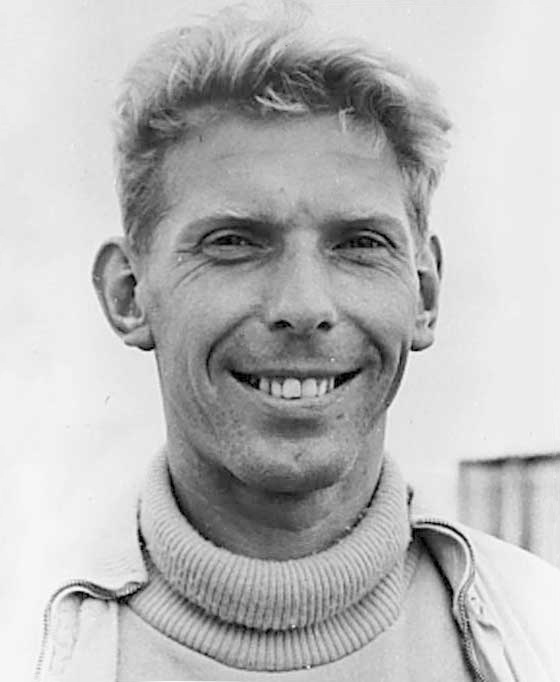

Personal information
- Born: 24 March 1928 Romelanda, Sweden
- Died: 6 February 2017 (aged 88)

Sport
- Sport: Rowing
- Club: Roddklubben Three Towns
Medal record
Representing Sweden
Olympic Games
Silver medal – second place	1956 Melbourne	Coxed four
European Rowing Championships
Silver medal – second place	1955 Ghent	Coxed four
Silver medal – second place	1955 Ghent	Eight

Ivar Mauritz Aronsson (24 March 1928 – 6 February 2017) was a Swedish rower who competed in the 1956 Summer Olympics. He won a silver medal in the coxed fours and finished fourth in the eights competition. He won two silver medals in these events at the 1955 European Championships.
