= Richard McClure =

Canadian rower (1935–2024)

Olympic medal record

Men's rowing
Silver medal – second place	1956 Melbourne	Eight

Richard (Dick) Neil McClure (January 20, 1935 – May 10, 2024) was a Canadian rower who competed in the 1956 Summer Olympics and the 1958 Commonwealth Games. In 1956 he was a crew member of the Canadian boat which won the silver medal in the eights event. In 1958 he got a silver medal in the coxless fours.

== Education ==
McClure graduated from UBC with a Mechanical Engineering degree in 1959.
