= Fred Kirkham =

Australian judge (1937-2007)

- Born: Frederick Angus Benfield; 5 April 1937; Leichhardt, New South Wales
- Died: 25 October 2007 (aged 70); Pretty Beach, New South Wales
- Education: Newington College
- Occupations: NSW Police Officer; Barrister; NSW District Court Judge
- Title: His Honour Judge Fred Kirkham
- Spouse: Janet Anne (Jan)
- Children: 2 sons, 2 daughters

Medal record

Men's rowing

Representing Australia

Olympic Games
| Bronze medal – third place | 1956 Melbourne | Eight |

Fred Kirkham (born Frederick Angus Benfield; 5 April 1937 – 25 October 2007) was an Australian Olympic medal winning rower, songwriter and judge.

== Early life ==
Kirkham was born in Leichhardt, New South Wales and attended Newington College (1945–1953). During his adolescence he was known as Fred Benfield but reverted to his mother's maiden name as an adult.

== Rowing career ==
Kirkham took up rowing at Newington College in Sydney. His senior rowing was with the Sydney Rowing Club. His first and only state appearance for New South Wales was in the three seat of the senior men's eight which contested and were runners-up for the King's Cup at the 1956 Australian Interstate Regatta.

In 1956 for the Melbourne Olympics the winning King's Cup Victorian eight was selected as the Australian men's eight excepting for Kirkham in the three seat from New South Wales. Kirkham rowed in the Australian eight in their Olympic campaign to a thrilling final where the Australian eight took it to the US and Canadian crews and came away with a bronze medal.

== Police and legal career ==
For twenty years Kirkham served as a member of the New South Wales Police Force. Kirkham served as a uniformed officer for several years before training to join the NSW Police Drug Squad.

After completing his HSC at the age of 30, Kirkham attended night school to complete his law degree. He was admitted to the New South Wales Bar in 1974 and practiced mainly in the area of personal injury. After 14 years at the Bar he was appointed a Judge of the District Court of New South Wales in 1988 where he served until his retirement.

== Music career ==
In 1963, Kirkham co-wrote The Delltones' hit song Hangin' Five with Ben Acton.

== Community activities ==
He served as President of the Old Newingtonians' Union at the time of its Centenary (1995–1996).
