= Davidge (surname) =

Notable persons with the surname Davidge include:

- Bud Davidge, Canadian songwriter and member of Simani
- Cecil Davidge (1901–1981), British barrister and academic
- Christopher Davidge (born 1929), British rower
- Cecil William Davidge (1863–1936), British academic, author and freemason
- George Davidge (1895–1978), English rugby union and rugby league footballer
- Glyn Davidge (1933–2006), Welsh rugby union player
- Graham Davidge (fl. 1975–present), Australian musician
- Guy Davidge (1878–1956), English cricketer
- Lee Davidge, American video game reviewer and former member of Channel Awesome
- Neil Davidge (born 1962), British record producer and songwriter
- Sandra Davidge, Canadian scientist studying pregnancy complications
- William Pleater Davidge (1814–1888), English comedian
- William Robert Davidge (1879–1961), architect and surveyor
