= Davidge =

Davidge may refer to:

- Davidge (surname)
- Davidge Gould (1758–1847), British admiral
- Davidge Page FRSE (died 1939), British chemist and mining engineer, and creator of Page's Weekly
- Davidge Data Systems, a former software company
