= Philip Seaforth James =

British lawyer and academic (1914–2001)

Professor Philip Seaforth James
- James in 1952
- Born: 28 May 1914; Surrey, England
- Died: 5 May 2001 (aged 86); Whitfield, Northamptonshire, England
- Education: Charterhouse School
- Alma mater: Trinity College, Oxford
- Occupations: Barrister, author, soldier
- Spouse: Wybetty Gerth (m. 1954)
- Children: 2
- Parents: Philip William James (father); Muriel Lindley Rankin (mother)
- Military career
- Allegiance: United Kingdom
- Branch: British Army
- Service years: 1938–1964
- Rank: Major
- Unit: Royal Regiment of Artillery
- Conflicts: Second World War; Burma campaign
- Awards: Mentioned in Despatches

Philip Seaforth James (28 May 1914 – 5 May 2001) was an English barrister, academic, author and soldier.

== Early life ==
James was born in Surrey, England. He was the son of Dr. Philip William James MC, a doctor in the Royal Army Medical Corps, and his wife Muriel Lindley Rankin, the daughter of Alfred Mottram Rankin of Broomhills, Essex and New Hall, Sutton. He was educated at Charterhouse School, Godalming, Surrey, followed by Trinity College, Oxford, graduating with a Master of Arts degree. After leaving Oxford, he was appointed as a research fellow at Yale University. After which he was called to the bar at The Honourable Society of the Inner Temple, where he practiced. After the Inner Temple, James attended the Royal Military College, Sandhurst, passing out as a Lieutenant in 1938, into the Army Reserve. He served in the Second World War with the Royal Regiment of Artillery in Burma and was mentioned in despatches on 14 December 1943. By the end of the war, James held the rank of major. He continued in the Territorial Army following the war and retired on 28 May 1964. On his retirement he was confirmed in the honorary rank of major.

== Legal and academic career ==
Following the war, James retired from the army and was appointed fellow and tutor of law at Exeter College, Oxford, in 1946. Whilst at Oxford he taught a number of pupils, including Peter Crill, William Lederman, Christopher Davidge, Sydney Kentridge and Maurice Drake. James worked at the University of Oxford until being appointed professor and head of the department of law at Leeds University, which position he held until 1975. Whilst holding the positions of professor and head of the department of law at Leeds, he was also appointed visiting professor of Yale University and also of the University of Louisville in 1962. Also in 1972 he was appointed as professor of the University of South Carolina, in which position he served in until 1973. In 1975 he was appointed professor of law of the University of Buckingham, and also head of the department of law. He worked at Buckingham until 1989. In 1981 he was appointed professor of the New York Law School and held that position until 1983.

At the same time as his academic career, James also held a number of other positions, from 1966 to 1975 he was chairman of the Yorkshire Rent Assessment Panel and of the Thames Valley Rent Assessment Panel from 1976 to 1980. From 1971 to 1972 he was the president of the committee as Assessor to County Court under Race Relations Acts. He was also governor of the Swinton Conservative College from 1961 to 1973.

== Publications ==
- An Introduction to English Law, 1950 (trans. Japanese, 1985), (Thirteen editions, latest edition published: James' Introduction to English Law. Butterworth & Co. 2010. ISBN 978-0-406024-45-9.)
- General Principles of the Law of Torts, 1959, (four editions, latest edition published: General Principles of the Law of Torts. Butterworth & Co. 1978. ISBN 978-0-406604-74-3.)
- Shorter Introduction to English Law, 1969
- Six Lectures on the Law of Torts, 1980 (trans. Spanish)
- Along with various other articles, notes and reviews on legal and political subjects

== Family ==
Through his father, James was the first cousin of Sqn Ldr Bertram Arthur James, MC. Through his mother, he was the first cousin of Colonel Sir Wilfrid Selwyn Kent Hughes and of his sister, Dr. Ellen Kent Hughes.

In 1954 Philip married Wybetty Gerth, daughter of Claas Pieter Gerth of Enschede an officer in the Royal Netherlands Navy. Philip and Wybetty had two sons:

- Dr. Philip Nicholas Lindley James (born 5 May 1955), a Doctor of Archaeology and Anthropology at Magdalene College, Cambridge, married musician Carole Pegg. No issue.
- Edward Peter Hilary James (born 26 April 1958), married Mary Philippa Rose Davidge, daughter of Cecil Davidge of Little Houghton House and his wife, Philippa Lester. They had three children together.

James died on 5 May 2001, in his house in Whitfield, Northamptonshire, at the age of 86.
