= Christopher Davidge =

British rower (1929–2014)

Christopher Davidge OBE DL
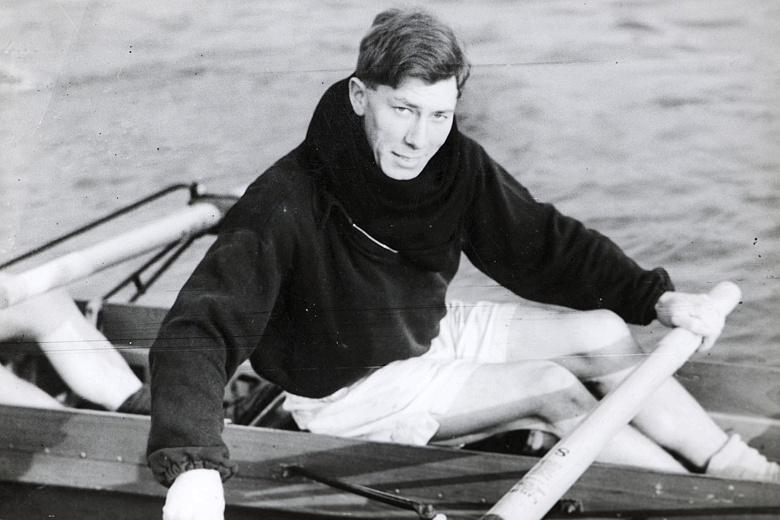
- Davidge at the 1952 Olympic Games

Personal information
- Born: Christopher Guy Vere Davidge; 5 November 1929 Northampton
- Died: 22 December 2014 (aged 85) Little Houghton House, Little Houghton, Northamptonshire
- Education: Eton College; Trinity College, Oxford
- Height: 183 cm (6 ft 0 in)
- Weight: 79 kg (174 lb)

Sport
- Sport: Rowing
Medal record
Men's rowing
Representing England
British Empire and Commonwealth Games
Gold medal – first place	1962 Perth	Coxless four
Bronze medal – third place	1962 Perth	eights
Representing Great Britain
European Rowing Championships
Bronze medal – third place	1954 Amsterdam	Coxless pair
Gold medal – first place	1957 Duisburg	Coxless pair

Christopher Guy Vere Davidge, of Little Houghton House, OBE DL (5 November 1929 – 22 December 2014) was a British rower who competed in the Summer Olympics three times in 1952, 1956 and 1960 and won the Silver Goblets at Henley Royal Regatta three times.

== Biography ==
Davidge was born in Northampton, son of Cecil Vere Davidge and Ursula Catherine Smyth, and the grandson of Cecil William Davidge. He was educated at Eton College and Trinity College, Oxford and rowed in the Oxford boat in the 1949 Boat Race. He returned to stroke Oxford in the 1951 Boat Race, when the Oxford boat sank, and the race was rerun on the following Monday. He was in the winning Oxford crew in the 1952 race and umpired the 1971 and 1975 races.

In 1952 Davidge competed for Great Britain, rowing at the 1952 Summer Olympics in Helsinki. He was in the coxless pair with David Callender and came fourth. In 1955 Davidge was runner-up partnering J A Gobbo in the Silver Goblets at Henley Royal Regatta to the Russians Buldakov and Ivanov. In 1956 he competed for Great Britain rowing at the 1956 Summer Olympics where he was a member of the unplaced eight. He won the Silver Goblets at Henley in 1957 and 1958, partnering Tony Leadley. In 1959 he switched to the double sculls and won the Double Sculls Challenge Cup at Henley partnering Stuart Mackenzie and beating George Justicz and Nicholas Birkmyre. Davidge competed for Great Britain again rowing at the 1960 Summer Olympics. He was in the coxless four with Michael Beresford, Colin Porter, and John Vigurs, coming fifth.

Davidge represented England and won a gold medal at the 1962 British Empire and Commonwealth Games in the coxless four with Michael Clay, John Beveridge and John Tilbury. In 1963 Davidge won Silver Goblets again, this time partnering Stuart Mackenzie. Davidge later served as President of the Leander Club. Davidge was also awarded an OBE "for services to Rowing". He died on 22 December 2014, aged 85.

He was High Sheriff of Northamptonshire in 1988, following his father Cecil Vere Davidge, who was High Sheriff in 1950. On 14 March 1994 he was appointed Deputy Lieutenant of Northamptonshire.

== See also ==
- List of Oxford University Boat Race crews

Honorary titles
Preceded by Edmund Crispin Stephen James George Brudenell	High Sheriff of Northamptonshire; 1988	Succeeded by Peter Douglas Smith
