= William Davidge =

William Davidge may refer to:

- William Pleater Davidge, English comedian
- William Robert Davidge, British architect and surveyor

== See also ==
- William Davidge Page (died 1939), British geologist, chemist, mining engineer and publisher
