= Jocelyn Frere Adburgham =

English architect and town planner (1900–1979)

Jocelyn Frere Adburgham FRSA
- Born: Jocelyn Frere Abram; 5 May 1900; Sylvans, Peaslake, Surrey
- Died: 23 January 1979 (aged 78); Northampton, England
- Education: Central School of Arts and Crafts
- Occupations: Architect; town planner
- Known for: First female planner granted professional membership of the Town Planning Institute (now the Royal Town Planning Institute)

Jocelyn Frere Adburgham FRSA (née Abram; 24 May 1900 – 23 January 1979) was a British architect and town planner, and the first woman admitted to professional membership of what is now the Royal Town Planning Institute.

== Early life and education ==
Adburgham was born Jocelyn Abram on 5 May 1900 at Sylvans, Peaslake, Surrey, the youngest of three children of Edward William Abram (1869–1929) and his wife, Lucy (née Ashton; 1865–1942). In 1936, her mother changed the family name by deed poll to Adburgham.

The family was then prosperous, and she was sent to several boarding schools before attending Notting Hill High School for Girls in London. In 1917, she and her sister, Sylvia, went to Bedford College, but both left without gaining a university matriculation qualification.

From 1920 to 1922 Adburgham studied at the Central School of Arts and Crafts, London, where she took classes in drawing, design and structural mechanics, as well as architectural history.

== Early career ==
Elizabeth Darling suggests Adburgham's choice of career may have been influenced by the fact that her father was one of the founders of two important architectural periodicals that still exist today, the Builders' Journal, later renamed the Architects' Journal, and the Architectural Review.

From 1922 to 1926 Abram worked as an architectural assistant at two firms, firstly W. H. Gaze & Son, and then P. A. Staynes & A. H. Jones. In 1926 she joined the office of the leading architect-planner and surveyor William Robert Davidge, who perhaps became her mentor. It was at this time that she passed the exams of the Town Planning Institute and became its first woman professional member, in 1928.

In the 1930s she worked mainly as a planner at Davidge's practice, including on plans, reports and projects for counties including Kent, Surrey, Berkshire, Oxfordshire and Cambridgeshire. In 1932, she sought to extend her qualifications to architecture, as she applied to become a licentiate member (a member who could demonstrate competence without having passed formal examinations) of the Royal Institute of British Architects (RIBA). Adburgham was "much admired by her colleagues as a model of the independent professional woman".

== Housing ==
Jocelyn Adburgham played a significant role in contributing to radical new thinking about the design of social housing, especially in the period before World War II. In 1934, she was one of the founders, with the housing consultant Elizabeth Denby and the architect Judith Ledeboer, of the Housing Centre, intended to promote the idea of modern, well-designed homes. She designed its headquarters in premises at 13 Suffolk Street, London, and eventually, in 1974, became its vice-president. As an independent architect she designed a block of flats for the Fulham House Improvement Society: Brightwells, Clancarty Road, Fulham.

Her scheme for a gymnasium (1938) at Nonington College of Physical Education in Kent was said to be the largest timber-frame building in England and used modular components, something in which she retained strong interest in her later, post-war work.

== World War II ==
During World War II, Adburgham and Ledeboer were both appointed to government committees seeking to shape postwar public housing policy. Adburgham was also a member of the Royal Academy planning committee that created a plan for the reconstruction of postwar London in 1942. She continued to contribute to discussions through writing and lecturing. In November 1942, Nature recorded that she gave a lecture on "Land Settlement - Its Sanitary and Architectural Aspects and After-War Possibilities".

== Later career ==
After World War II, Adburgham continued to work as an architect-planner, both in Davidge's practice (in which she became a partner) and independently. For example, she was recorded in 1959 as being the architect in charge of the re-erection of the historic Jolesfield Windmill in Sussex.

She was a member of the Garden Cities and Town Association Council (now the Town and Country Planning Association) for many years. She is frequently mentioned in the Association's journal in her capacity as a member of the Education and Membership Committees. She was actively involved in teaching and promoting the principles of garden cities and new towns. In 1967 in she formed part of a distinguished panel of planners, politicians, architects and sociologists for a one-day "Teach-In" in Harlow. The aim was to chart the success of the first generation of new towns and identify lessons for future towns being planned. Professionals along with residents of new towns examined amenities, recreational facilities, transportation, social planning and the progress of democratic control.

She also became a fellow of the Institute of Landscape Architects in 1958 and a Fellow of the Royal Society of Arts in 1962. She continued to work on county plans, was often called as an expert witness to planning tribunals and committees, and continued to write articles on planning subjects.

== Death ==
Adburgham died in Northampton of cardiac failure and atherosclerosis on 23 January 1979.
