= Elisabete A. Silva =

British-Portuguese academic working in urban and land use planning

Elisabete A. Silva is a British-Portuguese academic, who works in urban planning and more broadly in land use planning. She is a professor of spatial planning in the Department of Land Economy at the University of Cambridge. Silva was the first woman to be promoted to senior lecturer, reader and professor in the history of the department.

== Career ==
Silva joined the University of Cambridge in 2006 as a university lecturer (assistant professor). She earned tenure in 2009. In 2012, she became a senior lecturer (associate professor). In 2017, she became a reader and professor in spatial planning and was promoted to full professor in October 2020. Silva is the first woman to be promoted to senior lecturer, reader, and professor in the department of land economy. She is the director of the University of Cambridge Lab of Interdisciplinary Spatial Analysis (LISA Lab).

Silva's research is centred on the application of new technologies to spatial planning in particular city and metropolitan dynamic modelling through time. Her research interests include urban planning, land use, transportation, spatial analysis, data science, big data, complexity theory, smart/digital cities, geographic information systems, planning support systems, space-time dynamic models, computation, dynamic simulation, and soft artificial intelligence.

She is a Fellow of the Academy of Social Sciences. She is also a member of the Royal Town Planning Institute (RTPI).
