= Rowing at the 1962 British Empire and Commonwealth Games =

- Venue: Canning River
- Location: Applecross, Perth, Western Australia
- Dates: 22 November – 1 December 1962

Rowing at the 1962 British Empire and Commonwealth Games was the sixth appearance of Rowing at the Commonwealth Games.

Competition featured six events being held on the Canning River in Perth, Western Australia. The course was 2,000 metres with the finish line being located near the Raffles Hotel and Canning Bridge in Applecross.

England topped the rowing medal table with three gold medals.

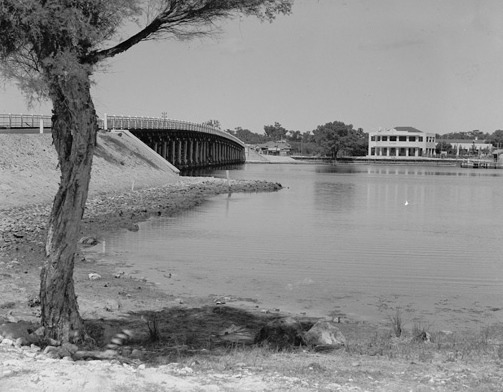
The finish line was near the Canning Bridge and Raffles Hotel

== Medal table ==
* Host nation (Australia)

| Rank | Nation | Gold | Silver | Bronze | Total |
|---|---|---|---|---|---|
| 1 | England | 3 | 1 | 2 | 6 |
| 2 | New Zealand | 2 | 3 | 0 | 5 |
| 3 | Australia | 1 | 1 | 3 | 5 |
| 4 | Wales | 0 | 1 | 0 | 1 |
| 5 | Canada | 0 | 0 | 1 | 1 |
| Totals (5 entries) | | 6 | 6 | 6 | 18 |

== Medal winners ==
| Event | Gold | Silver | Bronze |
|---|---|---|---|
| Single sculls | New Zealand | England | Australia |
| Double Sculls | England | New Zealand | Australia |
| Coxless pair | England | New Zealand | Australia |
| Coxless four | England | Wales | Canada |
| Coxed four | New Zealand | Australia | England |
| Eights | Australia | New Zealand | England |

== Single sculls ==
Final

| Pos | Athlete | Time |
|---|---|---|
| 1 | (New Zealand) James Hill | 7:39.7 |
| 2 | (England) Bill Barry | 7:44.9 |
| 3 | (Australia) Ian Tutty | 7:44.9 |

== Double sculls ==
Heat 1

| Pos | Team | Time |
|---|---|---|
| 1 | (New Zealand) Peter Watkinson & Murray Watkinson | 10.20.7 |
| 2 | (Wales) David Edwards & John Edwards | 10.36.8 |

Heat 2

| Pos | Team | Time |
|---|---|---|
| 1 | (England) George Justicz & Nicholas Birkmyre | 8.06.9 |
| 2 | (Australia) Barclay Wade & Graeme Squires | 8.14.6 |

Repechage

| Pos | Athlete | Time |
|---|---|---|
| 1 | Australia | 7:36.7 |
| 2 | Wales | 8:03.1 |

Final

| Pos | Athlete | Time |
|---|---|---|
| 1 | England | 6.52.4 |
| 2 | New Zealand | 6.54.3 |
| 3 | Australia | 7.01.4 |

== Coxless pair ==
Heat 1

| Pos | Team | Time |
|---|---|---|
| 1 | (Australia) Rodger Ninham & William Hatfield | 8.57.0 |
| 2 | (New Zealand) Graham Lawrence & Murray Lawrence | 9.20.1 |

Heat 2

| Pos | Team | Time |
|---|---|---|
| 1 | (England) Stewart Farquharson & David Lee Nicholson | 8.40.6 |
| 2 | (Canada) Bob Stubbs & Marty Gifford | 9.03.8 |

Repechage

| Pos | Athlete | Time |
|---|---|---|
| 1 | New Zealand | 7:43.2 |
| 2 | Canada | 7:49.8 |

Final

| Pos | Athlete | Time |
|---|---|---|
| 1 | England | 7.03.7 |
| 2 | New Zealand | 7.08.5 |
| 3 | Australia | 7:10.3 |

== Coxless four ==
Heat 1

| Pos | Team | Time |
|---|---|---|
| 1 | (Canada) Eldon Worobieff, Thomas Gray, Thomas Stokes, Ray McIntosh | 7.19.9 |
| 2 | (New Zealand) Colin Cordes, Geoffrey Benge, Louis Lobel, Rodney Hutchinson | 7.35.3 |

Heat 2

| Pos | Team | Time |
|---|---|---|
| 1 | (Wales) David Edwards, Jeremy Luke, Richard Luke, John Edwards | 7.28.7 |
| 2 | (Australia) Peter Raper, Maurice Grace, Simon Newcomb, David Boykett | 7.29.2 |
| 3 | (England) Christopher Davidge, Michael Clay, John Beveridge, John Tilbury | 8.10.4 |

Repechage

| Pos | Athlete | Time |
|---|---|---|
| 1 | England | 6:41.3 |
| 2 | Australia | 6:41.5 |
| 3 | New Zealand | 7:05.0 |

Final

| Pos | Athlete | Time |
|---|---|---|
| 1 | England | 6.31.1 |
| 2 | Wales | 6.32.5 |
| 3 | Canada | 6.34.9 |

== Coxed four ==
Final

| Pos | Athlete | Time |
|---|---|---|
| 1 | (New Zealand) Winston Stephens, Keith Heselwood, Hugh Smedley, George Paterson, Doug Pulman (cox) | 6:48.2 |
| 2 | (Australia) David Ramage, Derek Norwood, David Caithness, David John, Phillip Sarah (cox) | 6:48.8 |
| 3 | (England) John Russell, Richard Knight, John Vigurs, Colin Porter, Michael Howard-Johnston (cox) | 7:04.9 |

== Eights ==
Heat 1

| Pos | Team | Time |
|---|---|---|
| 1 | (England) Colin Porter, Christopher Davidge, John Beveridge, John Russell, John Vigurs, John Tilbury, Richard Knight, Michael Clay, Michael Howard-Johnston (cox) | 7:23.1 |
| 2 | (Australia) Charles Lehman, Dushan Stankovich, Graeme McCall, Ian Douglas, Martin Tomanovits, Paul Guest, Terry Davies, Walter Howell, David Palfreyman (cox) | 7:24.8 |

Heat 2

| Pos | Team | Time |
|---|---|---|
| 1 | (New Zealand) Alistair Dryden, Alan Grey, Christian Larsen, Colin Cordes, Darien Boswell, Alan Webster, Louis Lobel, Leslie Arthur, Robert Page (cox) | 7:07.5 |
| 2 | (Canada) Daryl Sturdy, Donald Dewar, Marty Gifford, Max Wieczorek, Mark Lemieux, Peter Hewlett, Richard Bordewick, Rodney Browne, W.T. William, Ashley Lucky (cox) | 7:09.5 |

Repechage

| Pos | Athlete | Time |
|---|---|---|
| 1 | Australia | 6:03.7 |
| 2 | Canada | 6:06.3 |

Final

| Pos | Athlete | Time |
|---|---|---|
| 1 | Australia | 5:53.4 |
| 2 | New Zealand | 5:53.6 |
| 3 | England | 6:09.4 |
