= Continuous productive urban landscape =

Urban design concept

Continuous productive urban landscape (CPUL) is an urban design concept integrating food growing into the design of cities through joining existing open space and disused sites into a linear landscape that connects to the countryside. The term was first used by Bohn & Viljoen Architects in 2004 at a time when making the connection between food and the city was unusual.

== General references ==
- Nishat Awan, Tatjana Schneider & Jeremy Till, 'Urban Farming', Spatial Agency, (2010); http://www.spatialagency.net/database/urban.farming.
- Katrin Bohn, André Viljoen, 'Continuous Productive Urban Landscape', Volume: After Zero, 8 (2008): 140–145.
- Nam Henderson, 'C.P.U.L.’s., Continuous Productive Landscapes', Thoughts on Everything under the Sun, (Oct 2009); http://namhenderson.wordpress.com/2009/10/21/c-p-u-l-s-continuous-productive-landscapes/
- Debra Solomon, 'Cultured and Landscaped Urban Agriculture', Volume: After Zero, 8 (2008): 132–137.
- André Viljoen, Katrin Bohn and Joe Howe, Continuous Productive Urban Landscapes: Designing Urban Agriculture for Sustainable Cities, (Oxford: Architectural Press, 2005).
