= Richard Knight (rower) =

British rower (born 1928)

Personal information
- Nationality: British (English)
- Born: 18 May 1928 London, England
- Died: 4 August 2023 (aged 93) Frimley, England
- Height: 193 cm (6 ft 4 in)
- Weight: 99 kg (218 lb)

Sport
- Sport: Rowing
- Event: fours / eights
- Club: Molesey BC
Medal record
Rowing
Representing England
British Empire & Commonwealth Games
Bronze medal – third place	1962 Perth	coxed four
Bronze medal – third place	1962 Perth	eights

Kenneth Richard Knight (born 18 May 1928 – 4 August 2023) was a British international rower who competed at the 1960 Summer Olympics.

== Biography ==
At the 1960 Olympic Games in Rome, Knight participated in the men's coxed four event.

Knight represented the England team at the 1962 British Empire and Commonwealth Games in Perth, Western Australia. He competed in the coxed four and eights, winning two bronze medals.
