= Michael Howard-Johnston =

English rower

Personal information
- Nationality: British (English)

Sport
- Sport: Rowing
- Event: coxswain - fours / eights
- Club: London RC; Leander Club; Molesey BC
Medal record
Rowing
Representing England
British Empire & Commonwealth Games
Bronze medal – third place	1962 Perth	coxed four
Bronze medal – third place	1962 Perth	eights

John Michael Howard-Johnston is a male former coxswain who competed for England.

== Biography ==
Howard-Johnston coxed for the London Rowing Club before being part of the Leander Club crew that finished runner-up to the Soviet Union crew Central Sport Club of the USSR Navy at the 1961 Grand Challenge Cup.

He represented the England team at the 1962 British Empire and Commonwealth Games in Perth, Western Australia. He competed in the coxed four and eights, winning two bronze medals.
