= Map for England =

A Map for England is an initiative launched in March 2012 by the Royal Town Planning Institute (RTPI), the UK body that represents 23,000 planning professionals, to make publicly available major maps for England relating to policies and programmes on the economy, transport, communications, housing and the environment that are held by individual government departments. The Institute argues that there is still no single place or data source within government that makes all of these maps available to view.

A Map for England is designed to help policy makers make better judgments about how individual policy proposals interact with and affect development of the country as a whole through better spatial planning. It would also, it is claimed, increase consistency in appraisal, improve security and resilience, and provide a better understanding of sectoral issues that might complement or conflict with each other.

== Research findings ==
The RTPI commissioned a study from the University of Manchester examining a broad range of existing government policies and how they relate to each other. To reach their conclusions, the researchers from the University's Centre for Urban Policy Studies examined government web sites, individual policy documents and large numbers of reports to find policies and programmes that have strong ‘spatial’ aspects to them: policies which potentially have a different impact in different parts of the country. It was a major task in itself to pull together almost 100 policy maps.

In about one third of these documents the researchers found that implications for different places are made explicit but in fully two thirds they are not. By overlaying a number of these maps and diagrams together, the researchers demonstrated that some policies and programmes, when considered against each other in relation to different parts of the country, may have unintended consequences. For example, the study revealed that there is considerable overlap between broad areas where housing growth is projected in the future and where there are the greatest environmental and policy constraints to growth. These constraints include the risk of flooding and expected future household water shortages.
