= Michael Clay (rower) =

English rower

Personal information
- Nationality: British (English)
- Born: 1933 Nottingham, England

Sport
- Sport: Rowing
- Event: fours / eights
- Club: Molesey BC
Medal record
Rowing
Representing England
British Empire & Commonwealth Games
Gold medal – first place	1962 Perth	coxless four
Bronze medal – third place	1962 Perth	eights

Michael C. Clay (born 1933) is a male former rower who competed for England.

== Biography ==
Clay represented the England team at the 1962 British Empire and Commonwealth Games in Perth, Western Australia. He competed in the coxless four and eights, winning a gold medal in the coxless four and a bronze medal in the eight.

He crewed for the Molesey Boat Club.
