= Little Houghton, Northamptonshire =

Village in Northamptonshire, England

Coordinates: 52.2310°N 0.8225°W

Little Houghton
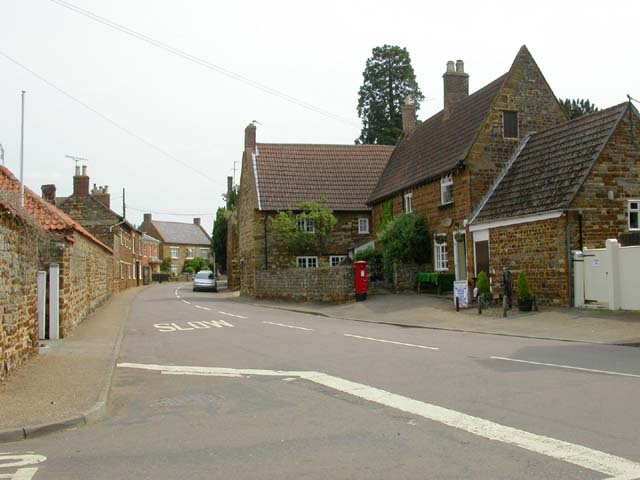
- Bedford Road in the village centre

- Location within Northamptonshire
- Population: 367 (2001 census). 412 (2011 census)
- OS grid reference: SP8059
  - London: 70 miles (112.7 km)
- Unitary authority: West Northamptonshire
- Ceremonial county: Northamptonshire
- Region: East Midlands
- Country: England
- Sovereign state: United Kingdom
- Post town: Northampton
- Postcode district: NN7
- Dialling code: 01604
- Police: Northamptonshire
- Fire: Northamptonshire
- Ambulance: East Midlands
- UK Parliament: Northampton South

Little Houghton is a village and civil parish in Northamptonshire, England, located about 2 miles (3.2 km) east of Northampton. At the time of the 2001 census, the parish's population was 367 people, increasing to 412 at the 2011 census.

The villages name means 'hill-spur farm/settlement'.

The Church of England parish church is dedicated to St Mary the Virgin.

Just off the A428 road between Bedford and Northampton, the village overlooks old gravel pits, (now converted to reservoirs) and a canal. Just across the valley is Billing Aquadrome.

In the village is Little Houghton House a Grade II-Listed Manor House with roots back to 1685.

To the north at Clifford Hill by the river Nene is the surviving motte or mound of Little Houghton Castle.
