= Cecil William Davidge =

British author, academic and freemason

Professor Cecil William Davidge
- Born: 28 March 1863; London, England
- Died: 16 January 1936 (aged 72); Kingsthorpe, England
- Education: Hurstpierpoint College; Durham University; University College London
- Occupations: Author and Academic
- Spouse: Elsie Hamer
- Children: 3 (including Cecil Davidge)

Cecil William Davidge (28 March 1863 – 16 January 1936) was a British academic and writer who spent much of his career in Japan. He was professor of English at the University of Commerce in Kobe and an active promoter of Freemasonry in Japan.

He was the father of the barrister and academic Cecil Vere Davidge and grandfather of Olympic rower Christopher Davidge.

== Early life and education ==
Davidge was born in London on 28 March 1863, the only son of Frederick William Davidge and Harriet Julia Frances Ponsonby, a daughter of Major-General the Hon. Sir Frederick Ponsonby.

He was educated at Hurstpierpoint College and studied at University College London, where he graduated with a BA in English, and subsequently received his MA in Theology from Durham University. His submitted essay was joint winner of Durham's Barry Theological Prize in 1884.

== Career ==
Davidge went to Japan in 1898 to work for the Society for the Propagation of the Gospel, heading its mission there until 1907 and teaching at the SPG School in Kobe. In 1907, he entered the service of the Japanese government as professor of English at the Kobe Higher Commercial School (later renamed Kobe University of Commerce), remaining there until 1930.

Davidge received the fourth class of both the Order of the Rising Sun and the Order of the Sacred Treasure, and was subsequently promoted to the Japanese official rank of chokunin.

Davidge was also active in Freemasonry in Japan. He founded Lodge Albion in the Far East, served as its master, and was a past district grand warden of the District Grand Lodge of Japan. He wrote Practical Hints for Craftsmen, a work on Freemasonry published in 1910.

Following his retirement in 1930, Davidge returned to England and settled at Kingsthorpe, Northamptonshire, where he became involved with the Northamptonshire Record Society.

== Personal life ==
Davidge married Elsie Hamer, daughter of Henry Hamer of Hamer Hall, Lancashire, in Kobe in 1900. They had three children: Cecil Vere Davidge, Cuthbert Roy Davidge and Beryl Davidge.

Elsie Davidge died in 1927 following a car accident in Kobe, when the taxi in which she was travelling went over a cliff.

Davidge died at Kingsthorpe on 16 January 1936, aged 72, following an operation.
