= John Tilbury (rower) =

British rower (1931–2020)

Personal information
- Nationality: British (English)
- Born: 4 January 1931 Ashford, Kent, England
- Died: 2 August 2000 (aged 69)
- Height: 183 cm (6 ft 0 in)
- Weight: 80 kg (176 lb)

Sport
- Sport: Rowing
- Event: fours / eights
- Club: Molesey BC
Medal record
Rowing
Representing England
British Empire & Commonwealth Games
Gold medal – first place	1962 Perth	coxless four
Bronze medal – third place	1962 Perth	eights

John Woodruffe Tilbury (4 January 1931 – 2 August 2000) was a British rower who competed at the 1960 Summer Olympics.

== Biography ==
At the 1960 Olympic Games in Rome he participated in the men's coxed four event.

He also represented the England team at the 1962 British Empire and Commonwealth Games in Perth, Western Australia. He competed in the coxless four and eights, winning a gold medal in the coxless four and a bronze medal in the eight.
