= Cecil Davidge =

British lawyer and academic

Cecil Vere Davidge
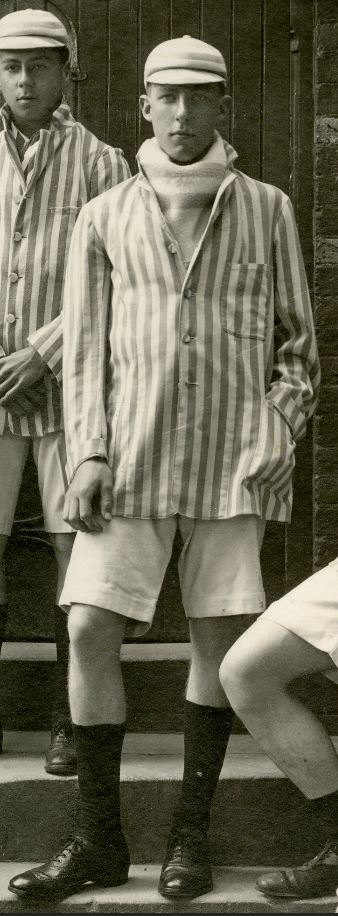
- Cecil Davidge pictured at Abingdon School in the 1919 first IV rowing team
- Born: 14 February 1901; Kobe, Japan
- Died: 27 January 1981 (aged 79); Little Houghton House, Northamptonshire, England
- Education: Pembroke College, Oxford
- Occupation: Barrister
- Spouses: Ursula Catherine Smyth (m. 1928–1948) Philippa Felicia Goldwyre Lester (m. 1961–1981)
- Children: 4 (including Christopher Davidge)
- Parents: Cecil Davidge (father); Elsie Hamer (mother)

Cecil Vere Davidge of Little Houghton House DL (14 February 1901 – 27 January 1981) was a British lawyer and academic, who served as a Fellow and bursar of Keble College, Oxford, and as High Sheriff of Northamptonshire.

== Life ==
Davidge was born on 14 February 1901. His father, Cecil William Davidge, was Professor of English at Kobe University in Japan. His mother, Elsie Davidge née Hamer was of an old Lancashire family who settled at Hamer Hall in the 14th century. Davidge was educated at Abingdon School from September 1913 until 1919 and rowed in the first four for the Abingdon School Boat Club before studying at Pembroke College, Oxford, where he obtained a second-class degree in Jurisprudence in 1923; he obtained the Bachelor of Civil Law degree in 1925.

He was called to the bar (becoming a barrister) as a member of Inner Temple in 1927. He was a lecturer in jurisprudence at Keble College, Oxford, from 1927 to 1933, when he was appointed a Fellow and Tutor in Jurisprudence; he was regarded as a fine tutor and lecturer. He remained a Fellow until 1968, when he retired. He also served as the college's bursar between 1945 and 1968, and as Sub-Warden from 1965 to 1968. During his time as bursar, he purchased a number of farms for the college for investment purposes, and considerably strengthened the college's financial position. On his retirement, he was appointed an Honorary Fellow. He was High Sheriff of Northamptonshire in 1950.

Davidge was a keen rower. Whilst at Pembroke, he rowed for the college boat club, and helped improve its position in Eights Week, the main inter-college races, raising them to high in the 1st Division of the races. He was later to become Treasurer of Oxford University Boat Club. He helped to attract rowers to Keble, making it a strong rowing college. He acquired a love of the country, particular horses and fox hunting, from his first wife, and became a keen follower of the Pytchley Hunt, in Northamptonshire. Davidge died in a hunting accident on 27 January 1981.

== Personal life ==
Davidge married his first wife, Ursula Catherine Smyth, daughter of Christopher Smyth and Emma Louisa, oldest daughter of Sir George William Gunning, 5th Baronet in 1928 and had issue:

- Christopher Guy Vere Davidge (5 November 1929 - 22 November 2014), represented Britain on three occasions in rowing events at the Summer Olympics (in 1952, 1956 and 1960).
- Anne Catherine Davidge (Born 19 September 1932), married William Ernest Broadbent Usher, had issue.

Ursula Catherine Smyth died on 26 October 1948 and Davidge remarried Philippa Felicia Goldwyre Lester, daughter of Peter Frank Lester (son of Rev. John Moore Lester) and Gertrude Mary Felicia Hewett (niece of Sir John Hewett and Rear Admiral George Hayley Hewett), in 1961 and had issue:

- Mary Philippa Rose Davidge (Born 25 August 1964), married Edward Peter Hilary James, son of Philip Seaforth James, had issue.
- Peter Vere Davidge (7 October 1966), married Alison Fergusson, no issue.

== See also ==
- List of Old Abingdonians
- List of High Sheriffs of Northamptonshire

Honorary titles
Preceded by Philip Henry de Lerisson Cazenove	High Sheriff of Northamptonshire; 1950	Succeeded by Geoffrey William Martin Lees
