= Davidge Data Systems =

Davidge Data Systems Corporation
- Type: Private
- Industry: Financial software / Middleware
- Founded: 1982
- Fate: Acquired
- Successor: GL-trade (2003)
- Headquarters: United States
- Area served: United States, Canada, United Kingdom
- Products: Middleware for trade ordering, execution, and back-office connectivity; Smart order routing
- Owner: Formerly private, then acquired by S1 Corporation (2000), later GL-trade (2003)

Davidge Data Systems Corporation was "a privately held software company that specializes in middleware for trade ordering, execution and back-office connectivity for Wall Street firms," including Smart order routing.

The company's DavNet includes the ability to efficiently handle large volumes of small orders.

== History ==
Davidge, founded 1982, was acquired by S1 Corporation, a holding company, in April, 2000, for about $20 million, at a time when it seemed that "banks in the U.S. were going to control much of the retail brokerage" industry, especially as related to online trading. S1 sold Davidge to Paris-based GL-trade in October, 2003.

At that time, Davidge software was used for "40% of US listed options volume and served "40 New York Stock Exchange members ... and several of the 10 largest brokerage firms."

Their international order routing includes Canada and Britain.

== See also ==
- Globex Trading System
- Execution management system
