= Little Houghton House =

Country House in Northamptonshire, England

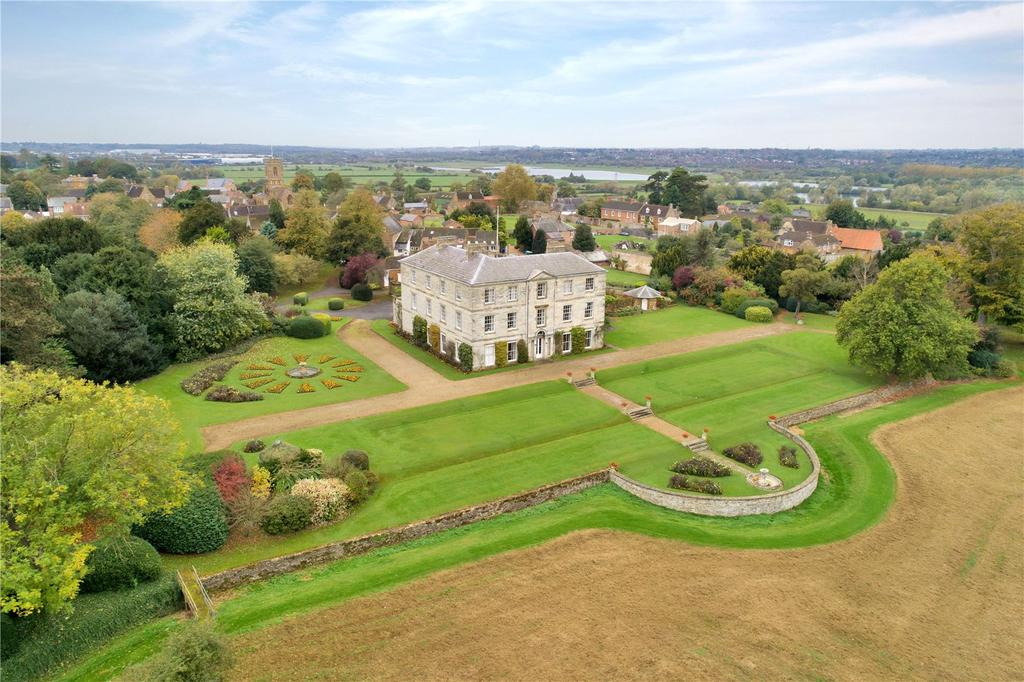
- Interactive map of the Little Houghton House area

General information
- Type: Manor house
- Location: Little Houghton, Northamptonshire, England
- Coordinates: 52.229503°N 0.822093°W
- Completed: 1685 and 1825
- Renovated: 1992 & 2015

Technical details
- Floor count: 3
- Floor area: 18,500 square ft

Listed Building – Grade II

Little Houghton House is a Grade II*-listed, nineteenth century Manor House with parts going back to 1685. The house has been owned by notable people, including Cecil Davidge and Christopher Davidge, both of whom served as High Sheriff of Northamptonshire and Deputy Lieutenants of Northamptonshire.

== History ==
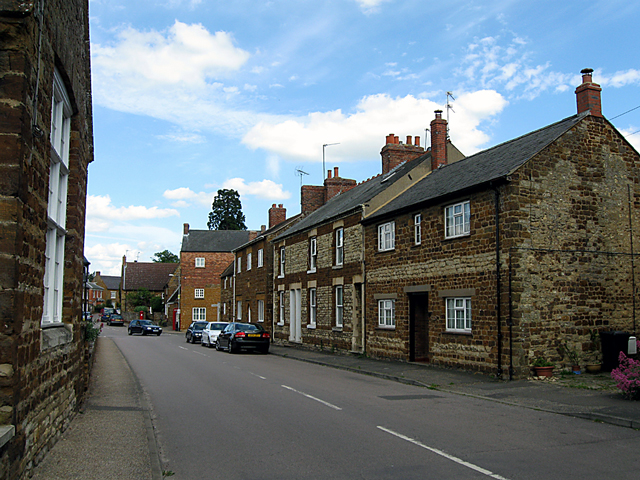
The village of Little Houghton

Little Houghton House was built initially in 1685 as a summerhouse for the Ward Family following their support for James II of England. The Ward family owned it continuously until the 1800s when Christopher Smyth bought the House from the last remaining Wards living at the house for his nephew William Tyler Smyth. Smyth was a descendant of the Smyths of Elkington Hall who had settled at that house since the middle 14th Century. Smyth renovated and enlarged the house in 1825 making it a north-east park facing house, using Kingsthorpe stone and stone from Horton Hall.

By descent, William Tyler Smyth passed the house to his eldest son, William Smyth who served as High Sheriff of Northamptonshire, and died without children so it went to his younger brother, the Rev. Christopher Smyth, Vicar of Little Houghton, then to his son Christopher Smyth who also served as High Sheriff. Christopher Smyth only had daughters however, so the house and estate went to his eldest daughter Ursula Catherine and her husband Cecil Vere Davidge who also served as High Sheriff of Northamptonshire. Davidge was himself a descendant of both the Smyths of Elkington and also of the Wards of Little Houghton. On Cecil Vere's death in 1981, the house passed to his son Christopher Guy Vere Davidge who followed his father as High Sheriff of Northamptonshire.

Following the death of Christopher Davidge, the house was put up for sale in 2016 by the estate agents Fisher German and was bought by the present owners.
