= Guy Davidge =

British Army officer and English cricketer

Guy Mortimer Coleridge Davidge
Personal information
- Full name: Guy Mortimer Coleridge Davidge
- Born: 2 March 1878; Woolwich, Kent, England
- Died: 17 February 1956 (aged 77); Hove, Sussex, England
- Batting: Right-handed

Domestic team information
- Years: Team
- 1911: Worcestershire

Career statistics
Competition	FC
Matches	1
Runs scored	0
Batting average	0.00
100s/50s	0/0
Top score	0
Balls bowled	0
Wickets	-
Bowling average	-
5 wickets in innings	-
10 wickets in match	-
Best bowling	-
Catches/stumpings	1/–
- Source: , 9 September 2007

Guy Mortimer Coleridge Davidge, DSO* (2 March 1878 – 17 February 1956) was a British Army officer and first-class cricketer. He was born in Woolwich, the son of Francis Elizabeth and Deputy Surgeon-General John George Davidge of the Army Medical Department. He spent the first two years of his life living in Woolwich, then from 1880 he lived on the Island of Malta, where his father was serving as a Brigade Surgeon with the Malta Garrison. His younger sister, Ethel Frances Davidge, died of diphtheria on 8 October 1884 while the family were in Malta. They returned to the UK to live in Portsmouth in October 1885 when Guy was seven.

== Military career ==
Following his education at Malvern College, Davidge was commissioned a second lieutenant in the Worcestershire Regiment on 16 February 1898 and promoted to lieutenant on 10 January 1900. In October 1901, he was seconded for service in South Africa, during the Second Boer War, and on 21 December 1901, he was promoted to captain. The war ended in June 1902, but Davidge stayed in South Africa for another six months, returning to Southampton on the SS Orcana in January 1903, when he returned to his regiment.

He later served in the First World War as an acting lieutenant-colonel commanding the 1st, 2nd and 3rd battalions of the regiment, receiving the Distinguished Service Order (DSO) in 1917 and bar in 1918 for conspicuous gallantry and leadership in the field. The citation for his bar appeared in The London Gazette in September 1918 and reads as follows:

For conspicuous gallantry and devotion to duty in action. He handled his battalion in a remarkably cool and resourceful way, and frequently anticipated orders according to the exigencies of the situation in difficult conditions. Again, later, he did particularly gallant and soldierly work, freely exposing himself to heavy fire and maintaining a close grip of the situation. It was due to his fine behaviour that his portion of the line remained intact.

Colonel Davidge later commanded the 2nd Battalion from 1921 to 1925, when he retired from the military.

Lieut.-Colonel G. M. C. Davidge, D.S.O.* died at home in Hove on 17 February 1956, aged 77. Brigadier H. U. Richards, C.B.E., D.S.O., represented the Worcestershire Regiment at the funeral, which took place at Brighton on 22 February 1956.

== Cricket ==
Davidge played just once at first-class level, appearing for Worcestershire against Oxford University at The University Parks in May 1911. He was bowled for a duck by Claude Burton in his only innings, and did not bowl, his only contribution to the scorecard coming when he held a catch to dismiss Robert Braddell.
