= Sandra Davidge =

Canadian scientist

Sandra Davidge is a Canadian scientist whose research explores pregnancy complications. She is a Distinguished University Professor in the Department of Obstetrics and Gynecology at the University of Alberta in Canada, and the executive director of the Women and Children's Health Research Institute. Davidge was appointed as a Fellow of the Royal Society of Canada (2021), and a fellow of the Canadian Academy of Health Sciences.

== Career ==
Davidge pursued post-doctoral research training at the Magee Womens Research Institute at the University of Pittsburgh (1993–1996). She previously held the Canada Research Chair (Tier 1) in Maternal and Perinatal Cardiovascular Health for two terms, and was the president of the Society for Reproductive Investigation (2017–18).

In 2019, Davidge's research (specifically, a project to explore why some unborn babies don’t get as much oxygen as they need in the womb, using specialized imaging equipment) was selected as one of ten University of Alberta projects which received $2.2 million from the Canada Foundation for Innovation program.

Davidge has published over 500 academic publications, which have been cited over 15,000 times, resulting in an h-index and i10-index of 69 and 221 respectively.

== Selected academic publications ==
- Fernandez-Patron, C., Radomski, M. W., & Davidge, S. T. (1999). Vascular matrix metalloproteinase-2 cleaves big endothelin-1 yielding a novel vasoconstrictor. Circulation research, 85(10), 906-911.
- Davidge, S. T. (2001). Prostaglandin H synthase and vascular function. Circulation research, 89(8), 650-660.
- Xu, Y., Williams, S. J., O'brien, D., Davidge, S. T., Xu, Y., Williams, S. J., ... & Davidge, S. T. (2006). Hypoxia or nutrient restriction during pregnancy in rats leads to progressive cardiac remodeling and impairs postischemic recovery in adult male offspring. The FASEB Journal, 20(8), 1251-1253.
- Roggensack, A. M., Zhang, Y., & Davidge, S. T. (1999). Evidence for peroxynitrite formation in the vasculature of women with preeclampsia. Hypertension, 33(1), 83-89.
- Roggensack, A. M., Zhang, Y., & Davidge, S. T. (1999). Evidence for peroxynitrite formation in the vasculature of women with preeclampsia. Hypertension, 33(1), 83-89.
