= William Robert Davidge =

Architect and surveyor (1879–1961)

William Robert Davidge (1879–1961) was an architect and surveyor, who combined these skills with an enthusiasm for urban improvement to become one of the pioneering leaders of the British town planning movement of the early twentieth century. He also played a key role in the introduction of town planning to Australia and New Zealand. He served as president of the Royal Town Planning Institute from 1926 to 1927.

== Biography ==
=== Early and personal life ===
William Robert Davidge was born on 17 February 1879 in Teddington, Middlesex. His parents were Henry Thomas Davidge and Louisa Anderson Davidge. He entered University College in 1896, and also studied at Kings College, graduating with a degree in architecture in 1900. He married Kathleen Mary Lane and had three children, Kathleen Enid Grace Davidge (24 Sep 1910), Margaret Mary Davidge (6 June 1912), and Helen Joyce "Jane" Davidge (15 May 1919).

=== Architect ===
From 1902 to 1907 Davidge was an assistant to W.E. Riley in the architect's department of the London County Council. He became an associate member of the Royal Institute of British Architects in 1904. In July 1912 he was made a Fellow of the Royal Institute of British Architects.

=== Surveyor ===
While a student Davidge was articled to Marshall Hainsworth, Surveyor to the Teddington Urban District Council. From 1907 to 1916 he was District Surveyor for Lewisham, Greenwich, and Woolwich. In 1919 he became Housing Commissioner for the Southern Counties and later for the London area.

=== Town planner ===
In the early 1900s Davidge took an interest in the emerging British Garden City Movement. In 1909 he presented a paper to the Institution of Surveyors (later to become the Royal Institution of Chartered Surveyors) in support of the Housing, Town Planning, &c. Act 1909 which proposed to make it mandatory for local authorities in the United Kingdom to introduce town planning systems.

From 1921 Davidge practiced as a consulting town planner and architect-surveyor, and in 1926 he was elected President of the Royal Town Planning Institute, as well as serving as Chair of the Executive of the Garden Cities and Town Planning Association (later to become the Town and Country Planning Association). Davidge prepared professional planning reports for places throughout the United Kingdom, including recommendations for Bedfordshire, Berkshire, Buckinghamshire, Cambridgeshire, Hertfordshire, West Kent and Belfast, Northern Ireland. As well as being a member of architecture and planning institutes, he was also an associate member of the Institution of Civil Engineers.

=== Influence in New Zealand and Australia ===
In 1914, Davidge travelled to New Zealand and from there to Australia. In both New Zealand and Australia Davidge gave a series of public lectures with Charles Reade (1880 - 1933), another enthusiast of town planning, to promote the new planning paradigms. As a result of this tour Davidge drew up New Zealand's first civic improvement scheme, a plan for the Taranaki city of New Plymouth. Davidge's plan was not, however, implemented.
