= Davidge Page =

William Davidge Page FRSE FCS FGS MIME (died 1939) was a British geologist, chemist, mining engineer and publisher, who created the weekly technical journal Page's Magazine aka Page's Weekly from 1902 to 1906.

In 1908 he was elected a Fellow of the Royal Society of Edinburgh. His proposers were Sir Charles Bright, Sir William Henry White, Edwin Sachs, and Frederick Hungerford Bowman.

He lived at Clun House on Surrey Street in London.

He died on 5 January 1939.
