= Royal Town Planning Institute =

Professional organization

- Abbreviation: RTPI
- Formation: 1914; 112 years ago
- Type: Professional body
- Headquarters: London, EC3; United Kingdom
- Region served: UK
- Members: c. 27,000 professional planners
- Main organ: RTPI General Assembly
- Website: www.rtpi.org.uk

The Royal Town Planning Institute (RTPI) is the professional body representing planners in the United Kingdom and Ireland. It promotes and develops policy affecting planning and the built environment. Founded in 1914, the institute was granted a royal charter in 1959. In 2025, it reported that it had over 27,000 members.

== History ==
Following the Housing, Town Planning, etc. Act 1909, surveyors, civil engineers, architects, lawyers and others began working together within local government in the UK to draw up schemes for the development of land. The idea of town planning as a new and distinctive area of expertise began to be formed. In 1910, Thomas Adams was appointed as the first Town Planning Inspector at the Local Government Board, and began having meetings with practitioners. In November 1913, a meeting was convented of interested professionals to establish a new Institute, and Adams was elected as the group's president. The Town Planning Institute was launched with an inaugural dinner in January 1914, and it was formally established on 4 September 1914 when its Articles of Association were signed.

In 1928 the institute elected its first female professional member, Jocelyn Frere Adburgham, and in 1959 received its royal charter, then becoming the Royal Town Planning Institute.

== Membership ==
The institute supports its membership through professional development, education and training for future planners. Fellows are entitled the use of the post-nominals FRTPI and chartered members may use MRTPI. In March 2012, it reported that it had over 23,000 members, of which 8,000 were women and 15,000 men. These included 1,100 international members, across 82 countries.

== See also ==
- Construction Industry Council
- Map for England
- Town and country planning in the United Kingdom
