= Julie Sauvé =

Canadian synchronized swimming coach (1952–2020)

Personal information
- Born: September 27, 1952 Montreal, Canada
- Died: April 7, 2020 (aged 67) Laval, Quebec, Canada

Sport
- Sport: Synchronised swimming

Julie Sauvé (French pronunciation: [ʒyli sove]; 27 September 1952 – 7 April 2020) was a Canadian synchronized swimming coach. Sauvé began her coaching career with the Club Aquatique Montréal Olympique in the 1970s before joining the Canadian synchronized swimming team in 1982. She continued to coach at the Club Aquatique Montréal Olympique until she was fired in 1993. While with the Canadian synchronized swimming team, Sauvé coached Olympic medallists Sylvie Fréchette, Penny Vilagos and Vicky Vilagos. After leaving the Canadian team in 2012, Sauvé coached the synchronized swimming teams of Brazil and Singapore during the remainder of the 2010s. Sauvé was inducted into Canada's Sports Hall of Fame in 2006 and the Canadian Olympic Hall of Fame in 2012.

== Early life and career ==
Sauvé was born in Montreal, Quebec, on 27 September 1952. Growing up, Sauvé became a synchronized swimmer for the Club Aquatique Montréal Olympique before becoming a coach there in the 1970s. As a synchronized swimming coach, Sauvé began to coach Sylvie Fréchette in 1976 before she joined the Canadian synchronized swimming team in 1982. While Sauvé coached Fréchette during the 1980s and 1990s, Fréchette won gold at the 1991 World Aquatics Championships. In international competitions, Sauvé coached Fréchette when she won gold medals at the 1986 Commonwealth Games, 1990 Commonwealth Games and 1992 Summer Olympics. Sauvé continued to coach synchronized swimming for the Club Aquatique Montréal Olympique until she was fired in 1993. The Montreal swimming club cited several reasons for Sauvé's firing, including focusing only on the best athletes and going over budget.

Apart from coaching Fréchette, Sauvé coached the team of Penny Vilagos and Vicky Vilagos during the 1980s and 1990s. During this time period, the Vilagos siblings won multiple synchronized swimming championships in Canada and silver at the 1992 Summer Olympics. In team events, Sauvé's synchronized swimmers won silver at the 1996 Summer Olympics and two gold medals at the 2011 Pan American Games. Sauvé was also one of the coaches for the Canadian synchronized swimming team that went to the 2012 Summer Olympics.

In 2012, Sauvé retired from synchronized swimming after declining to stay with Canada for an additional four years. After leaving the Canadian team, Sauvé turned down offers by multiple European and Asian countries. In 2014, Sauvé returned to synchronized swimming to train Brazil's team for the 2016 Summer Olympics. In 2017, Sauvé became the coach of the Singaporean synchronized swimming team. With Singapore, Sauvé and her athletes appeared at the 2017 World Aquatics Championships and 2019 World Aquatics Championships. In international events, Sauvé's athletes won seven medals at the 2017 Southeast Asian Games and participated at the 2018 Asian Games.

== Honours and personal life ==
In 2006, Sauvé was inducted into Canada's Sports Hall of Fame. Additional halls of fame that Sauvé was named into include the Canadian Olympic Hall of Fame in 2012 and the Quebec Sports Hall of Fame in 2015. On 7 April 2020, Sauvé died in Laval, Quebec.
