= Douglas Burke =

Douglas Burke or Doug Burke may refer to:

- Doug Burke (water polo) (born 1957), American Olympic water polo player
- Doug Burke (tennis) (born 1963), Jamaican professional tennis player
