= List of Olympic women's ice hockey players for Canada =

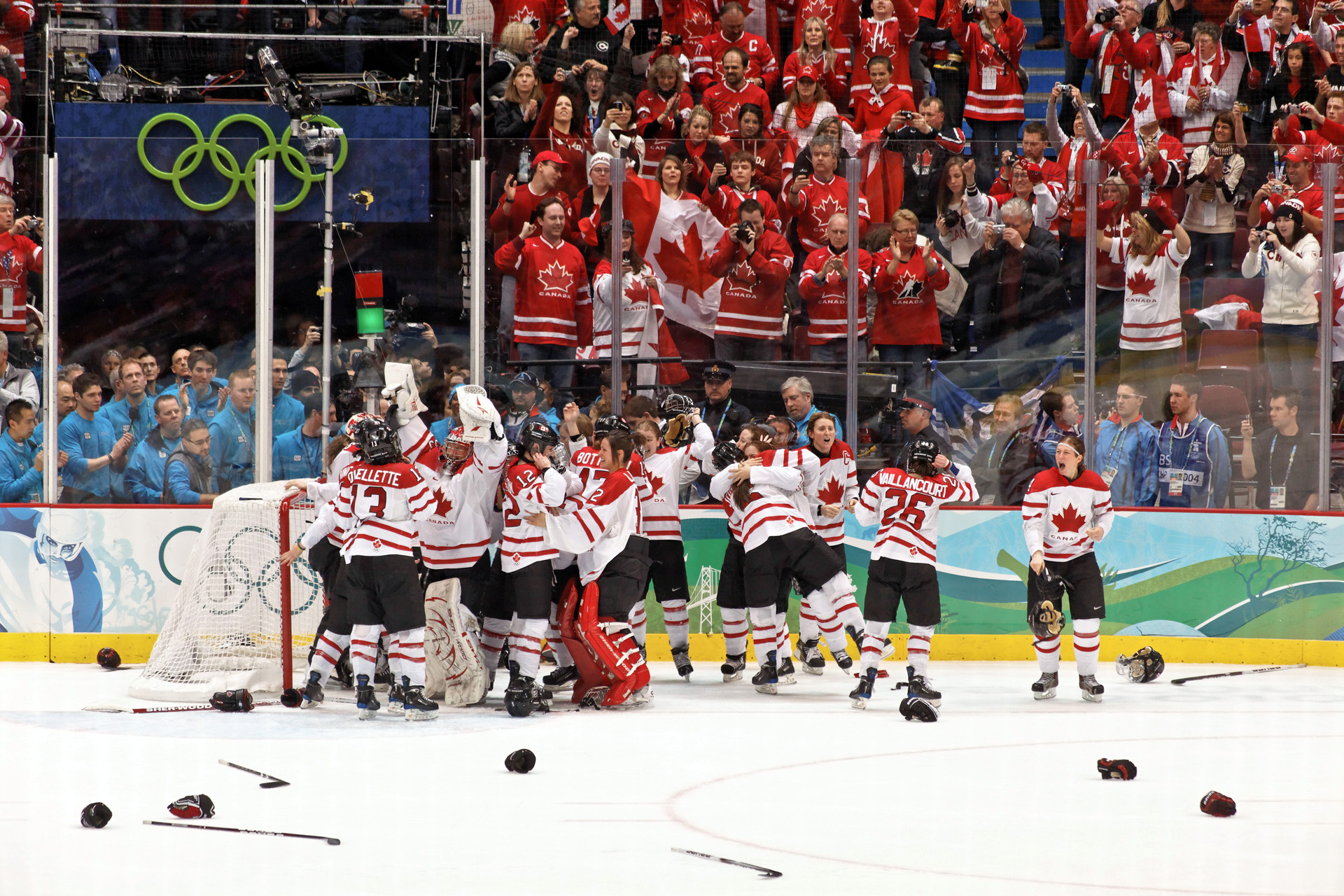
The gold medal-winning Canadian women's ice hockey team celebrates at the 2010 Winter Olympics.

Women's ice hockey tournaments have been staged at the Olympic Games since 1998. Nine goaltenders and sixty-one skaters have played for Canada.

Men's ice hockey had been introduced at the 1920 Summer Olympics, and added to the Winter Olympic Games in 1924. In July 1992, the International Olympic Committee (IOC) voted to approve women's hockey as an Olympic event first to be held at the 1998 Winter Olympics. Until 1998, Canada's national team had dominated women's hockey. Canadian teams had won every World Championship; however, by 1997, the American team had improved and was evenly matched with Canada. In thirteen games played between the two teams in 1997, Canada won seven and the United States won six. Canada and the United States dominated the preliminary round of the 1998 tournament, and in their head-to-head match up, the United States won 7–4. The two teams met in the gold medal final, which the United States won 3–1. The Canadian and American teams continued their rivalry, and in a rematch between the two at the 2002 Winter Olympics, Canada won 3–2. In 2006, the Canadian team started the tournament by outscoring opponents 36–1 over three games. American defenceman Angela Ruggiero accused the team of running up the score and warned that the event's Olympic status could be called into question due to a perceived lack of competitive teams. In the final, Canada beat Sweden to claim their second consecutive gold medal. In 2010, the Canadian and American teams outscored opponents in the preliminary round by 41–2 and 31–1 margins, respectively. This brought on more criticism about uneven competition. René Fasel said the IIHF would consider adding a mercy rule to future tournaments. In the gold medal game, Canada defeated the American team 2–0 to win their third consecutive gold. In 2014, the talent disparity had gotten smaller, with Canada and the United States only outscoring their opponents 11–2 and 14–4 in the preliminary round, respectfully. Nevertheless, Canada and the United States once again faced off in the gold medal game. Canada, on the shoulders of two goals from Marie-Philip Poulin came back from a 3–2 deficit late in the 3rd period to claim the gold medal for the fourth consecutive time. In 2018, the United States had their own come-from-behind victory, winning their first gold medal in 20 years. In 2022, Canada reclaimed gold against the United States in a game won off Marie-Philip Poulin's third career gold medal-winning goal.

Canada has won five gold medals and two silver medals in women's hockey. The Canadian Olympic Hall of Fame has inducted the 2002 and 2006 gold medal-winning teams. Cassie Campbell was the first female hockey player inducted into Canada's Sports Hall of Fame or any national hall of fame in 2007. Hayley Wickenheiser was inducted into the International Ice Hockey Federation (IIHF) Hall of Fame in May 2019. Seven members of Canada's Olympic Women's ice hockey teams have been inducted into the Hockey Hall of Fame — Geraldine Heaney (2013), Danielle Goyette (2017), Jayna Hefford (2018), Hayley Wickenheiser (2019), Kim St-Pierre (2020),Caroline Ouellette (2023), and Jennifer Botterill (2025). Two women have participated in five tournaments and won five medals (four gold and one silver)—Jayna Hefford, and Hayley Wickenheiser. Wickenheiser is the all-time leading scorer in the women's tournament at the Olympics, with 18 goals, 33 assists and 51 points.

== Key ==
Abbreviations
Abbreviation	Definition
HHOF	Hockey Hall of Fame
IIHFHOF	IIHF Hall of Fame
COHOF	Canadian Olympic Hall of Fame
CSHOF	Canada's Sports Hall of Fame

== Goaltenders ==
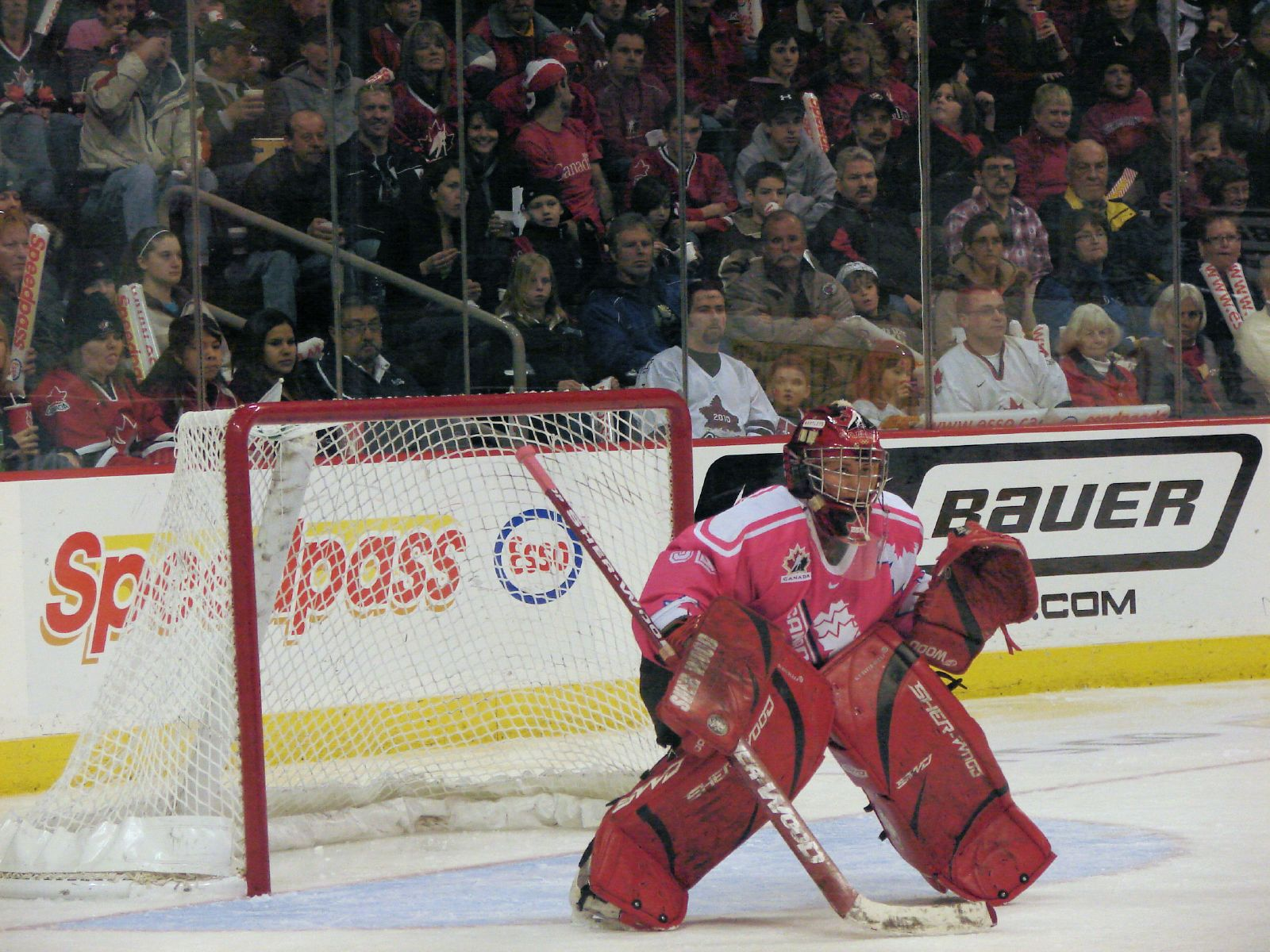
Charline Labonté won gold medals in 2006, 2010 and 2014.

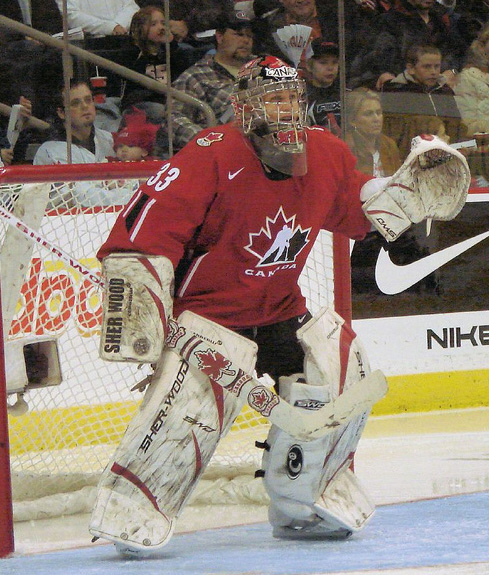
Kim St-Pierre was part of three gold medal-winning teams.

Note: GP = Games played; Min, TOI = Minutes played; W = Wins; L = Losses; T,T/OT = Ties; GA = Goals-against; GAA = Goals-against average; SO = Shutouts; SV% = Save percentage;

Canadian Olympic Goaltenders
Player	Olympics	GP	W	L	T	SO	Min	GA	GAA	Medals	Notes	Ref(s).
Ann-Renée Desbiens	2018, 2022, 2026	11	9	2	0	2	656	18	1.65	Silver (2018); Gold (2022); Silver (2026)		
Geneviève Lacasse	2014, 2018	1	1	0	0	0	60	1	1	Gold (2014); Silver (2018)		
Charline Labonté	2002^{[N 1]}, 2006^{[N 1]}, 2010, 2014	6	5	0	0	3	320	4	0.75	Gold (2006); Gold (2010); Gold (2014)	COHOF (2012)	
Emerance Maschmeyer	2022, 2026	5	4	1	0	2	248	2	0.48	Gold (2022); Silver (2026)		
Lesley Reddon	1998	3	2	1	1	0	151	9	3.58	Silver (1998)		
Manon Rhéaume	1998	4	2	0	1	1	208	4	1.15	Silver (1998)		
Kim St-Pierre	2002, 2006, 2010	8	8	0	0	4	460	6	0.78	Gold (2002); Gold (2006); Gold (2010)	COHOF (2009, 2012); HHOF (2020)	
Sami Jo Small	2002, 2006^{[N 1]}	1	1	0	0	1	60	0	0.00	Gold (2002)	COHOF (2009)	
Shannon Szabados	2010, 2014, 2018	9	8	1	0	4	568	7	0.74	Gold (2010); Gold (2014); Silver (2018)		

=== Reserve goaltenders ===
These goaltenders were named to the Olympic roster, but did not receive any ice time during games.

Player	Olympics	Medals	Notes	Ref.
Kristen Campbell	2022	Gold (2022)		
Kayle Osborne	2026	Silver (2026)		

Note 1. Named to roster, but did not play in any games.

== Skaters ==
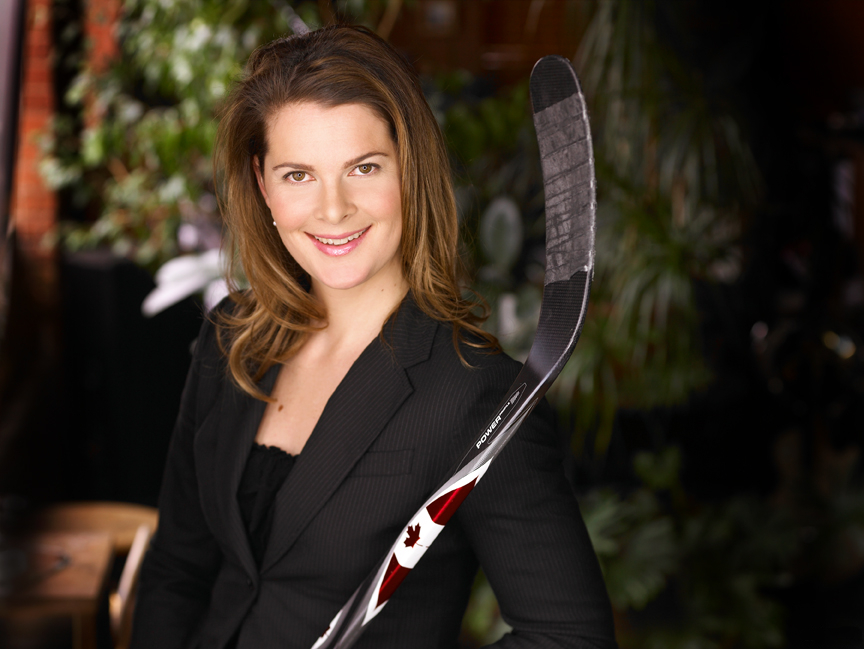
Jennifer Botterill was a member of four women's teams.

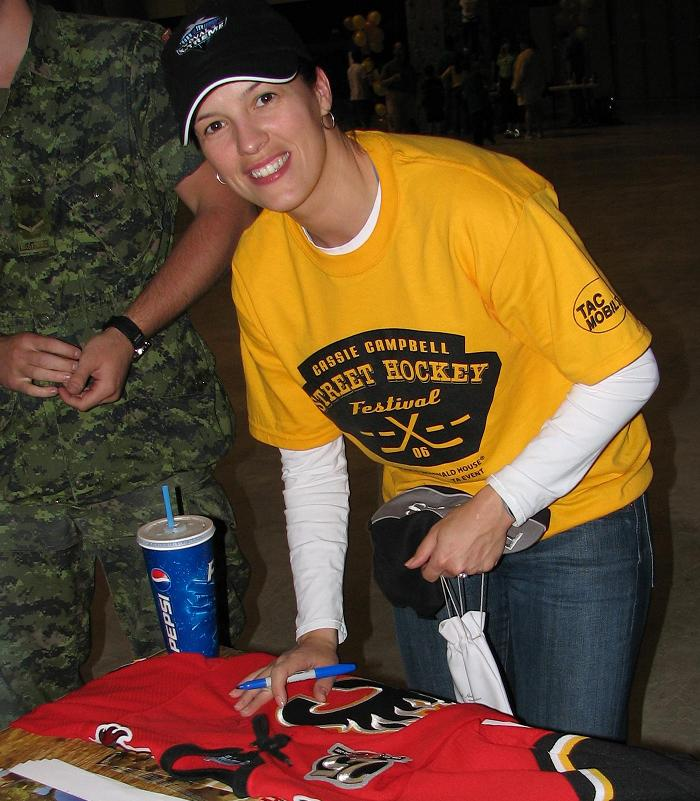
Cassie Campbell is the one of two Canadian players to be captain of multiple teams (2002 and 2006).

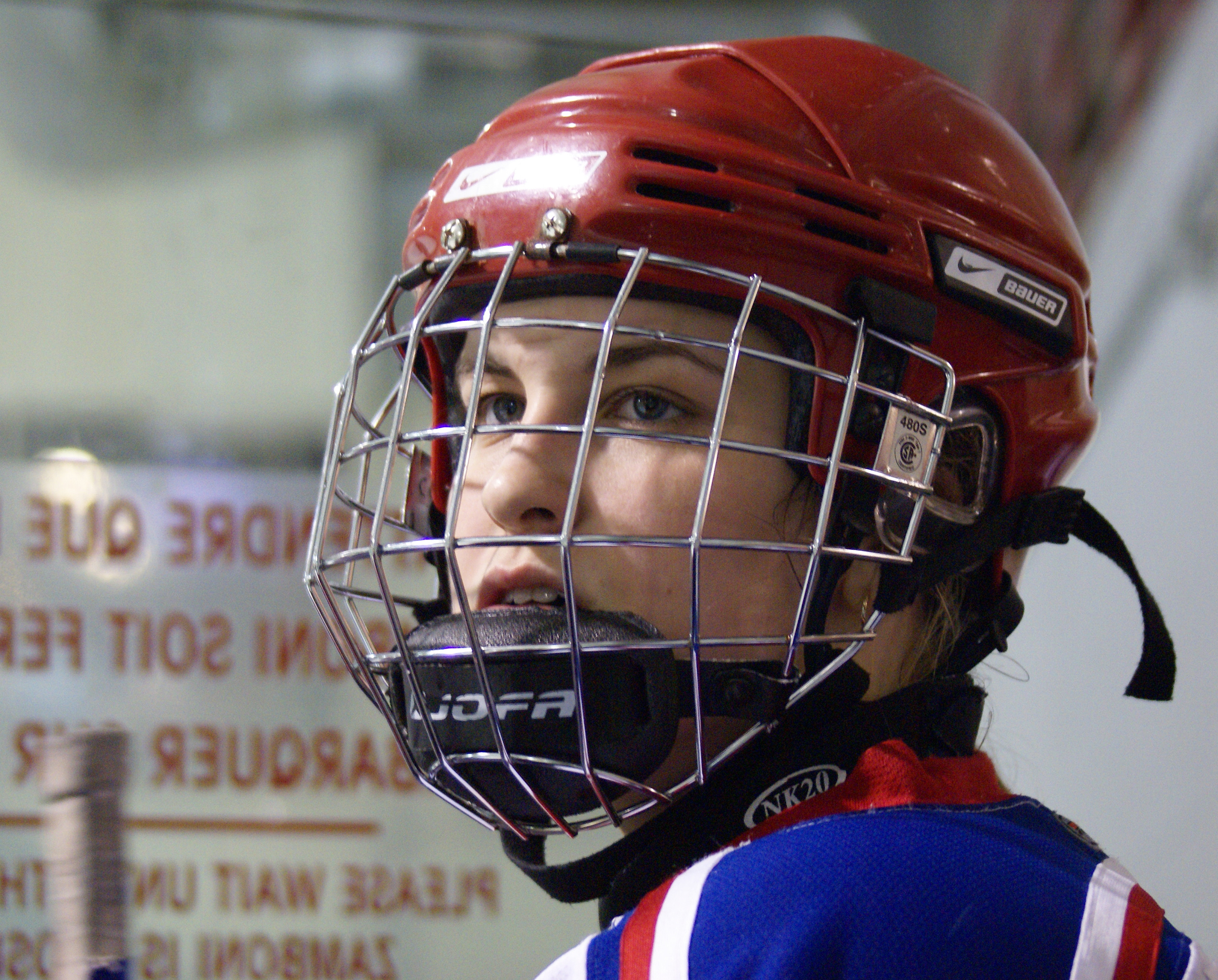
Marie-Philip Poulin scored the gold medal-winning goal in three separate Olympics (2010, 2014, 2022)

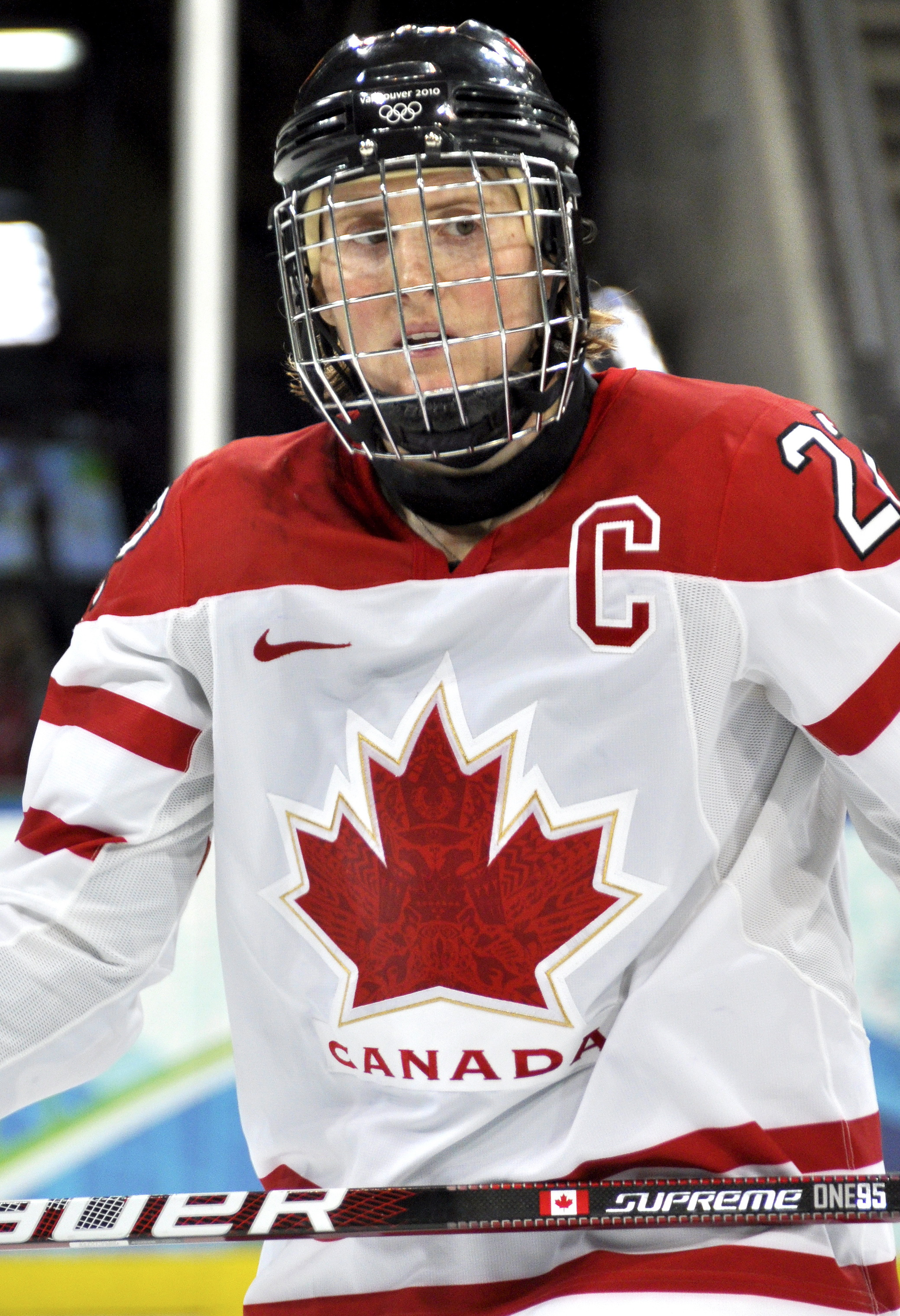
Hayley Wickenheiser is the all-time leading scorer in the women's event and was named tournament MVP twice.

Note: GP = Games played; G = Goals; A = Assists; Pts = Points; PIM = Penalty minutes;

Player	Olympics	GP	G	A	Pts	PIM	Medals	Notes	Ref(s).
Meghan Agosta	2006, 2010, 2014, 2018	20	17	11	28	8	Gold (2006); Gold (2010); Gold (2014); Silver (2018)	COHOF (2012)	
Dana Antal	2002	5	2	1	3	2	Gold (2002)	COHOF (2009)	
Erin Ambrose	2022, 2026	14	4	7	11	2	Gold (2022); Silver (2026)		
Gillian Apps	2006, 2010, 2014	15	10	11	21	18	Gold (2006); Gold (2010); Gold (2014)	COHOF (2012)	
Kelly Bechard	2002	5	0	1	1	2	Gold (2002)	COHOF (2009)	
Ashton Bell	2022	7	1	4	5	0	Gold (2022)		
Tessa Bonhomme	2010	5	2	2	4	0	Gold (2010)		
Jennifer Botterill	1998, 2002, 2006, 2010	21	4	11	15	12	Silver (1998); Gold (2002); Gold (2006); Gold (2010)	COHOF (2009, 2012); HHOF (2025)	
Bailey Bram	2018	5	0	0	0	0	Silver (2018)		
Thérèse Brisson	1998, 2002	11	7	4	11	12	Silver (1998); Gold (2002)	COHOF (2009)	
Cassie Campbell	1998, 2002, 2006	16	3	7	10	12	Silver (1998); Gold (2002); Gold (2006)	Team Captain (2002, 2006); CSHOF (2007); COHOF (2009, 2012)	
Isabelle Chartrand	2002	5	2	1	3	2	Gold (2002)	COHOF (2009)	
Emily Clark	2018, 2022, 2026	19	5	2	7	8	Silver (2018); Gold (2022); Silver (2026)		
Mélodie Daoust	2014, 2018, 2022	13	4	5	9	6	Gold (2014); Silver (2018); Gold (2022)		
Judy Diduck	1998	6	1	1	2	10	Silver (1998)		
Lori Dupuis	2002	5	1	1	2	4	Gold (2002)	COHOF (2009)	
Renata Fast	2018, 2022, 2026	19	1	8	9	10	Silver (2018); Gold (2022); Silver (2026)		
Gillian Ferrari	2006	5	0	0	0	0	Gold (2006)	COHOF (2012)	
Sarah Fillier	2022, 2026	14	11	6	17	6	Gold (2022); Silver (2026)		
Laura Fortino	2014, 2018	10	0	3	3	0	Gold (2014); Silver (2018)		
Jenn Gardiner	2026	7	1	0	1	0	Silver (2026)		
Julia Gosling	2026	7	3	2	5	0	Silver (2026)		
Danielle Goyette	1998, 2002, 2006	16	15	10	25	16	Silver (1998); Gold (2002); Gold (2006)	Flag bearer (2006); COHOF (2009, 2012); IIHFHOF (2013); HHOF (2017)	
Geraldine Heaney	1998, 2002	11	2	6	8	2	Silver (1998); Gold (2002)	IIHFHOF (2008); COHOF (2009); HHOF (2013)	
Jayna Hefford	1998, 2002, 2006, 2010, 2014	26	13	18	31	18	Silver (1998); Gold (2002); Gold (2006); Gold (2010); Gold (2014)	COHOF (2009, 2012); HHOF (2018)	
Haley Irwin	2010, 2014, 2018	15	6	3	9	4	Gold (2010); Gold (2014); Silver (2018)		
Sophie Jaques	2026	7	0	3	3	0	Silver (2026)		
Brianne Jenner	2014, 2018, 2022, 2026	24	11	9	20	2	Gold (2014); Silver (2018); Gold (2022); Silver (2026)		
Rebecca Johnston	2010, 2014, 2018, 2022	22	8	18	26	10	Gold (2010); Gold (2014); Silver (2018); Gold (2022)		
Becky Kellar	1998, 2002, 2006, 2010	21	1	7	8	14	Silver (1998); Gold (2002); Gold (2006); Gold (2010)	COHOF (2009, 2012)	
Gina Kingsbury	2006, 2010	10	2	4	6	8	Gold (2006); Gold (2010)	COHOF (2012)	
Jocelyne Larocque	2014, 2018, 2022, 2026	24	1	4	5	16	Gold (2014); Silver (2018); Gold (2022); Silver (2026)		
Carla MacLeod	2006, 2010	10	4	5	9	4	Gold (2006); Gold (2010)	COHOF (2012)	
Emma Maltais	2022, 2026	14	1	3	4	8	Gold (2022); Silver (2026)		
Kathy McCormack	1998	6	0	0	0	0	Silver (1998)		
Meaghan Mikkelson	2010, 2014, 2018	14	0	2	2	6	Gold (2010); Gold (2014); Silver (2018)		
Sarah Nurse	2018, 2022, 2026	19	6	15	21	10	Silver (2018); Gold (2022); Silver (2026)		
Karen Nystrom	1998	6	1	0	1	2	Silver (1998)		
Kristin O'Neill	2026	7	3	2	5	2	Silver (2026)		
Caroline Ouellette	2002, 2006, 2010, 2014	20	8	17	26	14	Gold (2002); Gold (2006); Gold (2010); Gold (2014)	Team Captain (2014); COHOF (2009, 2012); HHOF (2023); IIHFHOF (2023)	
Cherie Piper	2002, 2006, 2010	15	15	15	30	0	Gold (2002); Gold (2006); Gold (2010)	COHOF (2009, 2012)	
Marie-Philip Poulin	2010, 2014, 2018, 2022, 2026	27	20	19	39	18	Gold (2010); Gold (2014); Silver (2018); Gold (2022); Silver (2026)	Team Captain (2018, 2022, 2026)	
Cheryl Pounder	2002, 2006	10	2	2	4	6	Gold (2002); Gold (2006)	COHOF (2009, 2012)	
Jamie Lee Rattray	2022	7	5	4	9	0	Gold (2022)		
Lauriane Rougeau	2014, 2018	10	0	0	0	6	Gold (2014); Silver (2018)		
Jill Saulnier	2018, 2022	12	1	3	4	4	Silver (2018); Gold (2022)		
Laura Schuler	1998	6	0	0	0	4	Silver (1998)		
Ella Shelton	2022, 2026	14	0	6	6	4	Gold (2022); Silver (2026)		
Tammy Lee Shewchuk	2002	5	1	1	2	0	Gold (2002)	COHOF (2009)	
Fiona Smith	1998	6	1	1	2	2	Silver (1998)		
Colleen Sostorics	2002, 2006, 2010	15	1	8	9	12	Gold (2002); Gold (2006); Gold (2010)	COHOF (2009, 2012)	
Natalie Spooner	2014, 2018, 2022, 2026	24	6	15	21	2	Gold (2014); Silver (2018); Gold (2022); Silver (2026)		
France Saint-Louis	1998	6	1	2	3	0	Silver (1998)		
Laura Stacey	2018, 2022, 2026	19	5	6	11	8	Silver (2018); Gold (2022); Silver (2026)		
Vicky Sunohara	1998, 2002, 2006	16	6	7	13	8	Silver (1998); Gold (2002); Gold (2006)	COHOF (2009, 2012); IIHF Hall of Fame (2025)	
Kati Tabin	2026	7	0	0	0	0	Silver (2026)		
Claire Thompson	2022, 2026	14	3	14	17	6	Gold (2022); Silver (2026)		
Blayre Turnbull	2018, 2022, 2026	19	5	7	12	14	Silver (2018); Gold (2022); Silver (2026)		
Sarah Vaillancourt	2006, 2010	10	5	9	14	8	Gold (2006); Gold (2010)	COHOF (2012)	
Jenn Wakefield	2014, 2018	10	2	1	3	4	Gold (2014); Silver (2018)		
Catherine Ward	2010, 2014	10	2	3	5	6	Gold (2010); Gold (2014)		
Tara Watchorn	2014	5	1	0	1	10	Gold (2014)		
Daryl Watts	2026	7	2	6	8	2	Silver (2026)		
Katie Weatherston	2006	5	4	1	5	2	Gold (2006)	COHOF (2012)	
Hayley Wickenheiser	1998, 2002, 2006, 2010, 2014	26	18	33	51	12	Silver (1998); Gold (2002); Gold (2006); Gold (2010); Gold (2014)	Team Captain (2010); COHOF (2009, 2012); HHOF (2019); IIHFHOF (2019)	
Stacy Wilson	1998	6	1	5	6	0	Silver (1998)	Team Captain (1998)	
Micah Zandee-Hart	2022	7	0	4	4	8	Gold (2022)		

== See also ==
- List of Olympic men's ice hockey players for Canada
- List of Olympic women's ice hockey players for Finland
- List of Olympic women's ice hockey players for the United States
