= Vilagos =

Vilagos may refer to:

- Penny Vilagos (born 1963), Canadian synchronized swimmer
- Világos, Hungarian name of Șiria, a Romanian commune
- Surrender at Világos
