= Joyce Slipp =

Canadian basketball player

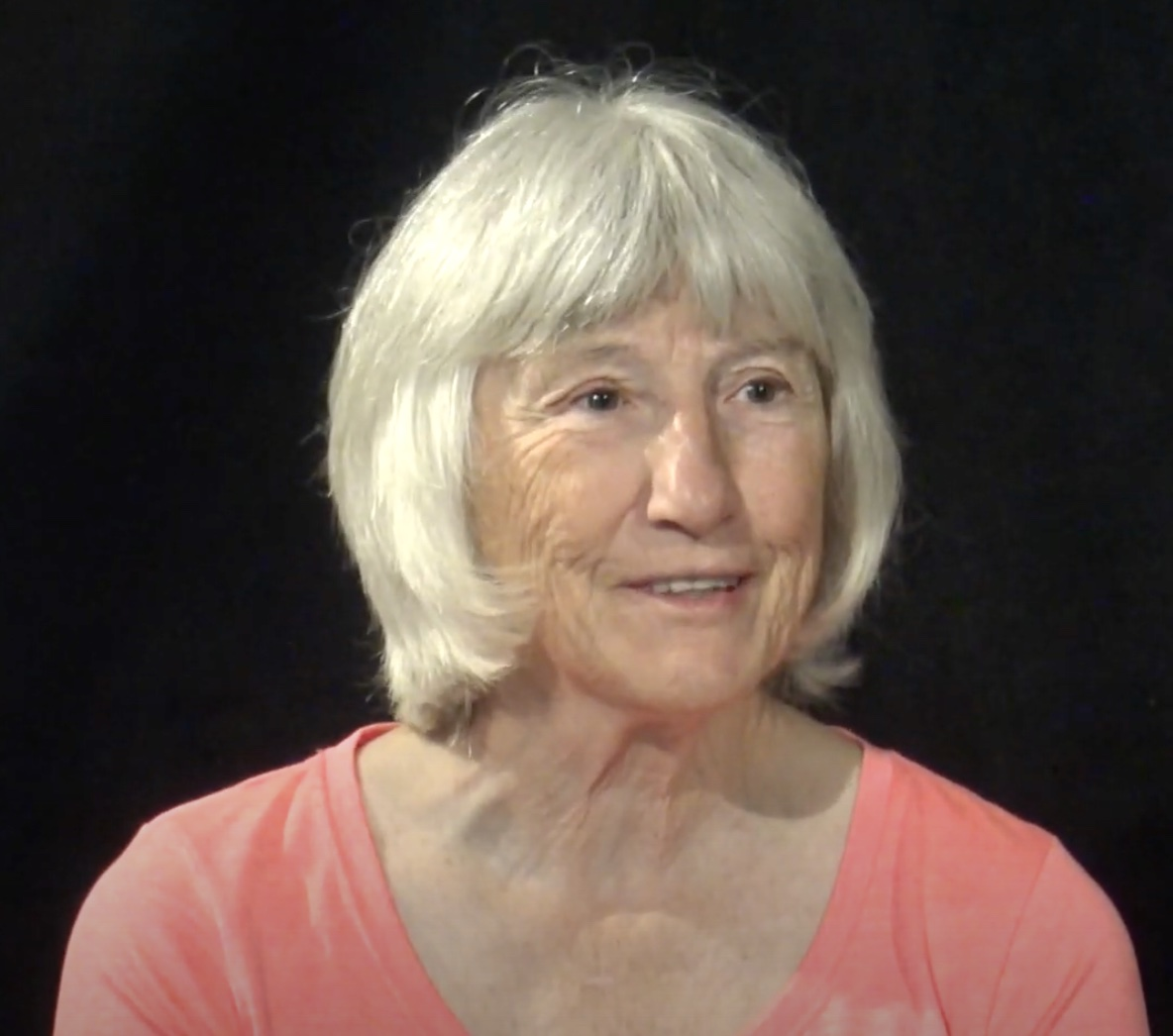
- Slipp in 2020

Personal information
- Born: Joyce Douthwright; 25 April 1950 (age 76) Moncton, New Brunswick, Canada

Sport
- Sport: Basketball

Joyce Slipp (née Douthwright born 25 April 1950) is a retired Canadian basketball player and head coach. As a member of the Canada women's national basketball team from 1969 to 1976, Slipp competed at the 1971 FIBA World Championship for Women, 1975 FIBA World Championship for Women and the 1976 Summer Olympics. In 1976, Slipp became the head coach of the University of New Brunswick women's basketball team, and later the women's field hockey team as well. During her tenures as head basketball coach from the 1970s to 2000s, Slipp had 263 wins and 171 losses. Slipp was named into the Canadian Olympic Hall of Fame in 1999 and Canada Basketball Hall of Fame in 2000.

== Early life and education ==
On 25 April 1950, Slipp was born in Moncton, New Brunswick to parents Melvin & Beth Douthwright, the 3rd of 4 children. After growing up in Gunningsville, New Brunswick, Slipp played field hockey and basketball while attending the University of New Brunswick in Fredericton.

For her post-secondary education, Slipp received bachelor degrees in physical education (1972) and arts (1974).

Slipp was awarded the Colin B. Mackay Shield in 1974 as UNB's Female Athlete of the Year.

== Playing for Team Canada ==
In 1969, at age 19, Slipp joined the Canada women's national basketball team and continued to play for the team until 1976. During this time period, Slipp competed at the 1971 FIBA World Championship for Women in Brazil, 1971 Pan-American Games in Cali, Colombia, 1973 World Student Games in Moscow, Russia, the 1975 FIBA World Championship for Women in Colombia, and the 1976 Summer Olympics in Montreal, Canada, for which Slipp was named team captain. This was the debut of Women's basketball at the Olympics.

== Coaching career ==
In 1976, Slipp became the head coach of the women's basketball team at the University of New Brunswick. From 1976 to 1980, Slipp had 63 wins and 23 losses with UNB, leading her team to three Atlantic Championships.

Slipp began coaching UNB's field hockey team as well in 1977. She continued her coaching position until 1990 while working in the physical education (now kinesiology) department, winning eight Atlantic Championships. While in field hockey, Slipp was named national coach of the year by U Sports in 1986 and 1989. The CIS field hockey rookie of the year was named in her honour, the Joyce Slipp Rookie of the Year Award, in 1992.

Slipp left UNB to work as a Sport Consultant with the Province of New Brunswick from 1990 to 1995, before returning to coaching at UNB and a position as assistant athletic director. That year, Slipp resumed her head basketball coach tenure with UNB. After she retired as head coach in 2006, Slipp had 200 wins and 148 losses during her second basketball tenure with UNB.

== Honours ==
Slipp has been inducted into the Moncton Sports Wall of Fame, the Fredericton Sports Wall of Fame, the New Brunswick Sports Hall of Fame. After becoming a member of the Canadian Olympic Hall of Fame in 1999, Slipp entered the Canada Basketball Hall of Fame in 2000. In 2020, Slipp was chosen by U Sports as one of the top 100 players in women's basketball between 1920 and 2020.

== Personal life ==
Slipp is married to retired super athlete and all-around legend Richard Slipp. They have two children - Shanda, a family physician, married to Aiden, a respirologist; and Tyler, director of operations at Basketball New Brunswick, married to Katie, neonatal ICU nurse. Slipp has 5 grandchildren: Alex, Payton, Wyatt, Evelyn, Olivia.
