= Canadian Olympic Hall of Fame =

The Canadian Olympic Hall of Fame is an honour roll of the top Canadian Olympic athletes, teams, coaches, and builders (officials, administrators, and volunteers). It was established in 1949. Selections are made by a committee appointed by the Canadian Olympic Committee. Inductees must have held Canadian citizenship or Canadian residency over the course of their careers.

The list is ordered by sport.

== A ==
=== Alpine skiing ===
- Currie Chapman, coach, 2005
- Betsy Clifford, athlete, 1971
- Laurie Graham, athlete, 2000
- Nancy Greene, athlete, 1971
- Anne Heggtveit, athlete, 1971
- Kathy Kreiner, athlete, 1976
- Kerrin Lee-Gartner, athlete, 1993
- Karen Percy-Lowe, athlete, 1995
- Steve Podborski, athlete, 1985
- Ken Read, athlete, 1984
- Gerry Sorensen, athlete, 1983
- Lucille Wheeler, athlete, 1958
- Rhoda Wurtele, athlete, 1953

=== Archery ===
- Lisa Buscombe, athlete, 1985
- Dorothy Lidstone, athlete, 1971
- Lucille Lessard, athlete, 1982
- Don Lovo, builder, 1988
- Joan Frances McDonald, builder, 1992

=== Artistic gymnastics ===
- Ernestine Russell, athlete, 1960
- Marilyn Savage, builder, 1982
- Kyle Shewfelt, athlete, 2014
- Willie Weiler, athlete, 1967

=== Artistic swimming ===
- Debbie Muir, builder, 1998
- Julie Sauvé, coach, 2012

=== Athletics ===
- 1996 Men's 4x100 metre Relay Team, athlete/team, 2004
- Bob Adams, builder, 1997
- Lillian Alderson, athlete, 1982
- Syl Apps, athlete, 1975
- Edward Archibald, athlete, 1979
- Donovan Bailey, athlete, 2005
- James Ball, athlete, 1973
- Jane Bell, athlete, 1949
- Calvin Bricker, athlete, 1960
- Debbie Brill, athlete, 1982
- Donald Buddo, builder, 1965
- Ethel Catherwood, athlete, 1949
- Douglas Clement, coach, 2006
- Cyril Coaffee, athlete, 1960
- Myrtle Cook, athlete, 1949
- Gérard Côté, athlete, 1955
- Eric Coy, athlete, 1963
- J. Howard Crocker, builder, 1960
- Bill Crothers, athlete, 1965
- John Davies, builder, 1964
- Eva Dawes, athlete, 1974
- Étienne Desmarteau, athlete, 1949
- Phil Edwards, athlete, 1950
- Neil Farrell, builder, 1967
- John Fitzpatrick, athlete, 1975
- Duncan Gillis, athlete, 1979
- George Goulding, athlete, 1949
- F. J. Halbhaus, athlete, 1977
- William Halpenny, athlete, 1979
- Andy Higgins, coach, 2001
- Robina Higgins, athlete, 1961
- Abby Hoffman, athlete/builder, 1996
- Ian Hume, athlete /Builder, 1983
- Lennie Hutton, athlete, 1977
- Harry Jerome, athlete, 1963
- Ben Johnson, athlete, 1988
- Diane Jones-Konihowski, athlete, 1995
- Greg Joy, athlete, 1994
- Joe Keeper, athlete, 1977
- Robert Kerr, athlete, 1949
- Bruce Kidd, athlete, 1966, builder, 1994
- Dallas C Kirkey, builder, 1974
- Walter Knox, builder, 1960
- John Loaring, builder, 1956
- Tom Longboat, athlete, 1960
- Margaret Lord, builder, 1965
- Tom Lord, builder, 1969
- Frank Lukeman, athlete, 1971
- Garfield MacDonald, athlete, 1979
- Nancy McCredie, athlete, 1968
- Mark McKoy, athlete, 1993
- Duncan McNaughton, athlete, 1949
- Aileen Meagher, athlete, 1965
- Alex Oakley, athlete, 1992
- Larry O'Connor, athlete, 1968
- George Orton, athlete, 1996
- Bill Parnell, athlete, 1977
- Marita Payne, athlete, 2001
- Victor Pickard, athlete, 1974
- Paul Poce, builder 2010
- Sam Richardson, athlete, 1977
- Bobbie Rosenfeld, athlete, 1949
- Billy Sherring, athlete, 1949
- Ethel Smith, athlete, 1949
- Dave Steen, athlete, 1977
- Hilda Strike, athlete, 1964
- Bruny Surin, athlete, 2010
- George Sutherland, athlete, 1956
- Betty Taylor, athlete, 1968
- Fred Tees, builder, 1960
- Earl Thomson, athlete, 1949
- Lynn Williams, athlete, 1997
- Percy Williams, athlete, 1949
- Alex Wilson, athlete, 1953
- Harold Webster, athlete, 1955
- James Worrall, builder, 1965

== B ==
=== Badminton ===
- Richard Birch, athlete, 1973
- Dorothy M. Forsyth, builder, 1975
- Claire Lovett, athlete, 1972
- Jack Purcell, athlete, 1973
- Marjorie Shedd, athlete, 1976
- Don Smythe, athlete, 1974
- Dorothy Tinline, builder, 1977
- Dorothy Walton, athlete, 1971

=== Basketball ===
- Jack Donohue, builder, 1991
- Norman Gloag, builder, 1987
- James Naismith, builder, 1995
- Bob Osborne, builder, 1973
- Andrew Pipe, builder, 1999
- Joyce Slipp, athlete, 1999
- Bev Smith, athlete, 2003
- Sylvia Sweeney, athlete, 1996
- Jay Triano, athlete, 1995

=== Biathlon ===
- Myriam Bédard, athlete, 2004
- Ray Kokkonen, builder, 1999
- Patricia Ramage, builder, 1985

=== Bobsleigh ===
- Doug Anakin, athlete, 1971
- Douglas Connor, athlete, 1956
- John Emery, athlete, 1971
- Victor Emery, athlete, 1971
- Peter Kirby, athlete, 1971
- David MacEachern, athlete, 2011
- Cliff Powell, builder, 1988
- Robert H. Storey, builder, 1998

=== Boxing ===
- Eugene Brousseau, athlete, 1953
- Horace Gwynne, athlete, 1949
- Moe Herscovitch, athlete, 1956
- Lennox Lewis, athlete, 1989
- Tommy Osborne, athlete, 1953
- Bert Schneider, athlete, 1949
- Jerry Shears, builder, 1976
- Dennis White, builder, 1964

=== Builders (general) ===
- Henry Brock, builder, 1980
- Leo Burns, builder, 1965
- Norton Crow, builder, 1960
- James Daly, builder, 1994
- George Duthie, builder, 1966
- Mervin E. Ferguson, builder, 1972
- W. E. Findlay, builder, 1960
- Geoff Gowan, builder, 2002
- Nelson C. Hart, builder, 1960
- Frederick C. Henshaw, builder, 1960
- Charles E. Higginbottom, builder, 1966
- George M. Higginbottom, builder, 1960
- J. A. Jackson, builder, 1960
- Frank King, 2008
- Ralph Klein, builder, 2014
- Arthur Lamb, builder, 1960
- Fernand Landry, builder, 1990
- John Leslie, builder, 1960
- Carol Anne Letheren, 2010
- Peter Lougheed, 2010
- George C. Machum, builder, 1960
- Kenneth D. McKenzie, builder, 1976
- James G. B. Merrick, builder, 1960
- Jack Poole, builder, 2019
- John Powell, builder, 1992
- Pat Quinn, builder, 2014
- M. M. (Bobby) Robinson, builder, 1960
- Frank Shaughnessy, builder, 1982
- Walter Sieber, 2010
- George Ritchie Starke, builder, 1960
- Randy Starkman, builder, 2019
- R. Tait McKenzie, builder, 2000
- William J. Warren, 2008
- E. Kenneth Yost, builder, 1963

== C ==
=== Canadian Olympic Order ===
- Richard Garneau, journalist, 2014

=== Canoeing ===
- Frank Amyot, athlete, 1949
- Doug Bennett, athlete, 2000
- Larry Cain, athlete, 1985
- Frank Clement, builder, 1971
- Renn Crichlow, athlete, 1992
- Hugh Fisher, athlete, 1986
- Alwyn Morris, athlete, 1988
- Frank Garner, builder, 1995
- Sue Holloway, athlete, 1986
- Aubrey Ireland Jr, athlete, 1953
- Ken Lane, athlete, 2003
- Roy Nurse, athlete, 1956
- Bert Oldershaw, athlete/builder, 2004
- E. Howard Radford, builder, 1976
- Robert Sleeth, builder, 1986

=== Cross-country skiing ===
- Pierre Harvey, athlete, 2006
- Beckie Scott, athlete, 2012

=== Curling ===
- 1998 Women's Gold Medal Team Curling Team, athlete/team, 2005

=== Cycling ===
- Steve Bauer, athlete, 2005
- Russell Coupland, builder, 1973
- Curt Harnett, athlete, 2006
- Pierre Harvey, athlete, 2006
- Jocelyn Lovell, athlete, 1984

== D ==
=== Diving ===
- George Athans, athlete, 1953
- Sylvie Bernier, athlete, 1985
- Beverly Boys, athlete, 1987
- Alexandre Despatie, athlete, 2019
- Donald Dion, coach, 2000
- Eldon C. Godfrey, builder, 2003
- Émilie Heymans, athlete, 2019
- Irene MacDonald, athlete, 1976
- Anne Montminy, athlete, 2005
- Annie Pelletier, athlete, 2003
- Alf Phillips, Sr., athlete, 1976
- Donald Webb, builder, 1993

== E ==
=== Equestrian ===
- Jim Day, athlete, 1971
- Jim Elder, athlete, 1971
- Tom Gayford, athlete, 1971
- Gail Greenough, athlete, 1988
- Ian Millar, athlete, 1990

== F ==
=== Fencing ===
- John Andru, athlete, 1976
- Percy Erskine Nobbs, builder, 1961
- Carl Schwende, athlete/builder, 1985
- Ernest A. Dalton, builder, 1960

=== Figure skating ===
- Norris Bowden, athlete, 1958
- Isabelle Brasseur, athlete, 2001
- Kurt Browning, athlete, 1990
- Petra Burka, athlete, 1972
- Toller Cranston, athlete, 1976
- Frances Dafoe, athlete, 1958
- Lloyd Eisler, athlete, 2001
- Johnny Esaw, builder, 1991
- Donald Jackson, athlete, 1972
- Maria Jelinek, athlete, 1972
- Otto Jelinek, athlete, 1972
- Karen Magnussen, athlete, 1973
- Elizabeth Manley, athlete, 1989
- Paul Martini, athlete, 1985
- Robert McCall, athlete, 1989
- Donald McPherson, athlete, 1972
- Suzanne Morrow, athlete/builder, 1988
- Brian Orser, athlete, 1988
- Robert Paul, athlete, 1958
- David Pelletier, athlete, 2008
- Melville Rogers, builder, 1972
- Louis Rubenstein, builder, 1950
- Jamie Salé, athlete, 2009
- Barbara Ann Scott, athlete, 1949
- Elvis Stojko, athlete, 2011
- Barbara Underhill, athlete, 1985
- Barbara Wagner, athlete, 1958
- Montgomery Wilson, athlete, 2007
- Tracy Wilson, athlete, 1989

=== Freestyle skiing ===
- Jean-Luc Brassard, athlete, 2012
- Sarah Burke, builder, 2012
- Lloyd Langlois, athlete, 1987
- Alain LaRoche, athlete, 1987
- Jean-Marc Rozon, athlete, 1998

== G ==
=== Golf ===
- George Lyon, athlete, 1971
- Ada Mackenzie, athlete, 1971
- Ross Somerville, athlete, 1975

== I ==
=== Ice hockey ===
- 1920 Winnipeg Falcons, athlete/team, 2006
- 1948 RCAF Flyers, athlete/team, 2008
- 1952 Edmonton Mercurys, athlete/team, 2002
- 2002 Olympic gold medal men's team, athlete/team, 2009
- 2006 Olympic gold medal women's team, athlete/team, 2012
- 2010 Olympic gold medal men's team, athlete/team, 2012
- Melody Davidson, coach, 2011
- A. Sidney Dawes, builder, 1976
- Kenneth P. Farmer, builder, 1971
- Randy Gregg, athlete, 1999
- Sydney Halter, builder, 1963
- Jack Hamilton, builder, 1968
- Bob Hindmarch, builder, 2009
- Dave King, builder, 1997
- George Mara, athlete/builder, 1989
- William Northey, builder, 1960
- Claude C. Robinson, builder, 1960
- Danièle Sauvageau, coach, 2008
- Vancouver 2010 Women's Hockey Team, team, 2019
- Brian Wakelin, builder, 2007

== J ==
=== Judo ===
- Frank Hatashita, builder, 1974
- Hiroshi Nakamura, coach, 2019
- Doug Rogers, athlete, 1973
- Shigetaka Sasaki, builder, 1986
- Yoshio Senda, builder, 1977

== K ==
=== Kayaking ===
- Caroline Brunet, athlete, 2010

== L ==
=== Luge ===
- Douglas Connor, athlete, 1956
- Cliff Powell, builder, 1988

== M ==
=== Modern pentathlon ===
- Sandor Kerekes, builder, 1990
- Patricia Ramage, builder, 1985

== R ==
=== Rhythmic gymnastics ===
- Lori Fung, athlete, 1985

=== Rowing ===
- 1984 Men's Eight Rowing Team, athlete/team, 2003
- 2008 Men's Eight Rowing Team athlete/team, 2014
- Don Arnold, athlete, 1958
- Darren Barber, athlete, 1994
- Kirsten Barnes, athlete, 1994
- Neil Campbell, builder, 1987
- Shannon Crawford, athlete, 1994
- Andy Crosby, athlete, 1994
- Megan Delehanty, athlete, 1994
- Ignace Walter D'Hont, athlete, 1958
- Ken Drummond, athlete, 1958
- Mike Forgeron, athlete, 1994
- Jack Guest, athlete, 1952
- Thomas Michael Harris, athlete, 1958
- Kathleen Heddle, athlete, 1994
- David Helliwell, athlete, 1958
- George Hungerford, athlete, 1971
- Phillip Keuber, athlete, 1958
- Roger Jackson, athlete, 1971
- Silken Laumann, athlete, 1992
- Lorne Loomer, athlete, 1958
- Thomas Loudon, builder, 1960
- Archibald MacKinnon, athlete, 1958
- Robert Marland, athlete, 1994
- Marnie McBean, athlete, 1994
- Richard Neil McClure, athlete, 1958
- Douglas McDonald, athlete, 1958
- Bill McKerlich, athlete, 1958
- Al Morrow, builder, 1994
- Patrick J. Mulqueen, builder, 1960
- Jessica Munroe, athlete, 1994
- Carl Ogawa, athlete, 1958
- Terrence Paul, athlete, 1994
- Bobby Pearce, athlete, 1952
- Derek Porter, athlete, 1994
- Donald Wayne Pretty, athlete, 1958
- Michael Rascher, athlete, 1994
- Frank Read, builder, 1974
- Bruce Robertson, athlete, 1994
- Lou Scholes, athlete, 1952
- Raymond Sierpina, athlete, 1958
- Glen Smith, athlete, 1958
- Tricia Smith, athlete, 2000
- G. Nelles Stacey, builder, 1972
- Brenda Taylor, athlete, 1994
- Lesley Thompson, athlete, 1994
- Arthur Toynbec, athlete, 1958
- John Wallace, athlete, 1994
- Lawrence Kingsley West, athlete, 1958
- Robert Wilson, athlete, 1958
- Kay Worthington, athlete, 1994
- Joseph Wright Jr, athlete, 1952
- Joseph Wright Sr, athlete, 1953
- Herman Zloklikovits, athlete, 1958

== S ==
=== Sailing ===
- Caroll-Ann Alie, athlete, 1993
- Evert Bastet, athlete, 1994
- Hans Fogh, athlete, 1986
- Paul Henderson, builder, 2001
- Hank Lammens, athlete, 1993
- Paul McLaughlin, builder, 1977
- Reginald Stevenson, athlete, 1971

=== Shooting ===
- Gilmour Boa, athlete, 1955
- Walter Ewing, athlete, 1955
- George Genereux, athlete, 1953
- Susan Nattrass, athlete, 1975
- Gerald Ouellette, athlete, 1957
- John Primrose, athlete, 1975
- Linda Thom, athlete, 1985

=== Ski jumping ===
- Horst Bulau, athlete, 1993

=== Soccer ===
- Thomas Fried, builder, 2005
- London 2012 Women's Soccer Team, team, 2019

=== Speed skating – long track ===
- Susan Auch, athlete, 2010 (also short track)
- Gordon Audley, athlete, 1998
- Gaetan Boucher, athlete, 1984
- Sylvia Burka, athlete, 1977
- Maurice Gagné, builder, 2006
- Charles Gorman, athlete, 1950
- Jean Gernier, builder, 1995
- Cindy Klassen, athlete, 2014
- Catriona Le May Doan, athlete, 2008
- Cathy Priestner, athlete, 1994
- Jean Wilson, athlete, 1971

=== Speed skating – short track ===
- 1998 men's short track relay team, athlete/team, 2005
- Sylvie Daigle, athlete, 1991
- Marc Gagnon, athlete, 2007
- Marcel Lacroix, coach, 2014
- Nathalie Lambert, athlete, 1992
- Maryse Perreault, athlete, 1992

=== Swimming ===
- Alex Baumann, athlete, 1985
- Munroe Bourne, athlete, 1972
- George Burleigh, athlete, 1976
- Leslie Cliff, athlete, 1997
- Angela Coughlan, athlete, 1977
- Victor Davis, athlete, 1985
- Phyllis Dewar, athlete, 1972
- Howard Firby, coach, 2009
- George Gate, coach, 2002
- Nancy Garapick, athlete, 1993
- Cheryl Gibson, athlete, 2001
- Phyllis Haslam, athlete, 1977
- Paul Hauch, builder, 1975
- George Hodgson, athlete, 1949
- Ralph Hutton, athlete, 1972
- Marianne Limpert, athlete, 2007
- Curtis Myden, athlete, 2011
- Anne Ottenbrite, athlete, 1985
- Bob Pirie, athlete, 1975
- Irene Pirie, athlete, 1977
- Tom Ponting, athlete, 1998
- Dick Pound, athlete/builder, 1975
- Bruce Robertson, athlete, 1973
- Graham Smith, athlete, 2002
- Deryk Snelling, athlete, 2007
- Mary Stewart, athlete, 1975
- Elaine Tanner, athlete, 1971
- Mark Tewksbury, athlete, 1993
- Jeno Tihanyi, coach, 2004
- Beth Whittall, athlete, 1955

=== Synchronized swimming ===
- Michelle Cameron, athlete, 1991
- Sylvie Fréchette, athlete, 2006
- Sharon Hambrook, athlete, 1996
- Kelly Kryczka Irwin, athlete, 1996
- Helen Vanderburg, athlete, 1982
- Penny Vilagos & Vicky Vilagos, athletes, 2002
- Carolyn Waldo, athlete, 1987

== T ==
=== Tennis ===
- Bob Bedard, athlete, 1973
- Willard Crocker, athlete, 1972
- Bernie Schwengers, athlete, 1973
- Malcolm Laird Watt, builder, 1975
- Robert N. Watt, builder, 1971
- Jack Wright, athlete, 1972

=== Triathlon ===
- Les McDonald, builder, 2007
- Simon Whitfield, athlete, 2019

== V ==
=== Volleyball ===
- Anton Furlani, builder, 1992
- Garth Pischke, athlete, 1999

== W ==
=== Water skiing ===
- George Athans, athlete, 1971
- Caroline Duthie, athlete, 1956
- Joel McClintock, athlete, 1984
- Judy McClintock, athlete, 1987

=== Weightlifting ===
- Maurice Allan, builder, 1973
- Christine Girard, athlete, 2019
- Harvey Hill, builder, 1977
- Gerald Gratton, athlete, 1955
- Doug Hepburn, athlete, 1953
- Pierre St. Jean, athlete, 1969

=== Wrestling ===
- Egon Beiler, athlete, 1983
- George Denniston, builder, 1976
- Henry Gordon Hudson, athlete, 1960
- Daniel Igali, athlete, 2012
- Danny MacDonald, athlete, 1976
- Earl McCready, athlete, 1961
- Fred Oberlander, builder, 1972
- Vernon Pettigrew, builder, 1973
- Joseph Schleimer, athlete, 1960
- Donald Stockton, athlete, 1953
- Bert Taylor, builder, 1994
- Jim Trifunov, athlete, 1953
- Allan Turnbull, builder, 1987

== See also ==
- List of members of Canada's Sports Hall of Fame
- Lou Marsh Trophy
