= List of Olympic women's ice hockey players for the United States =

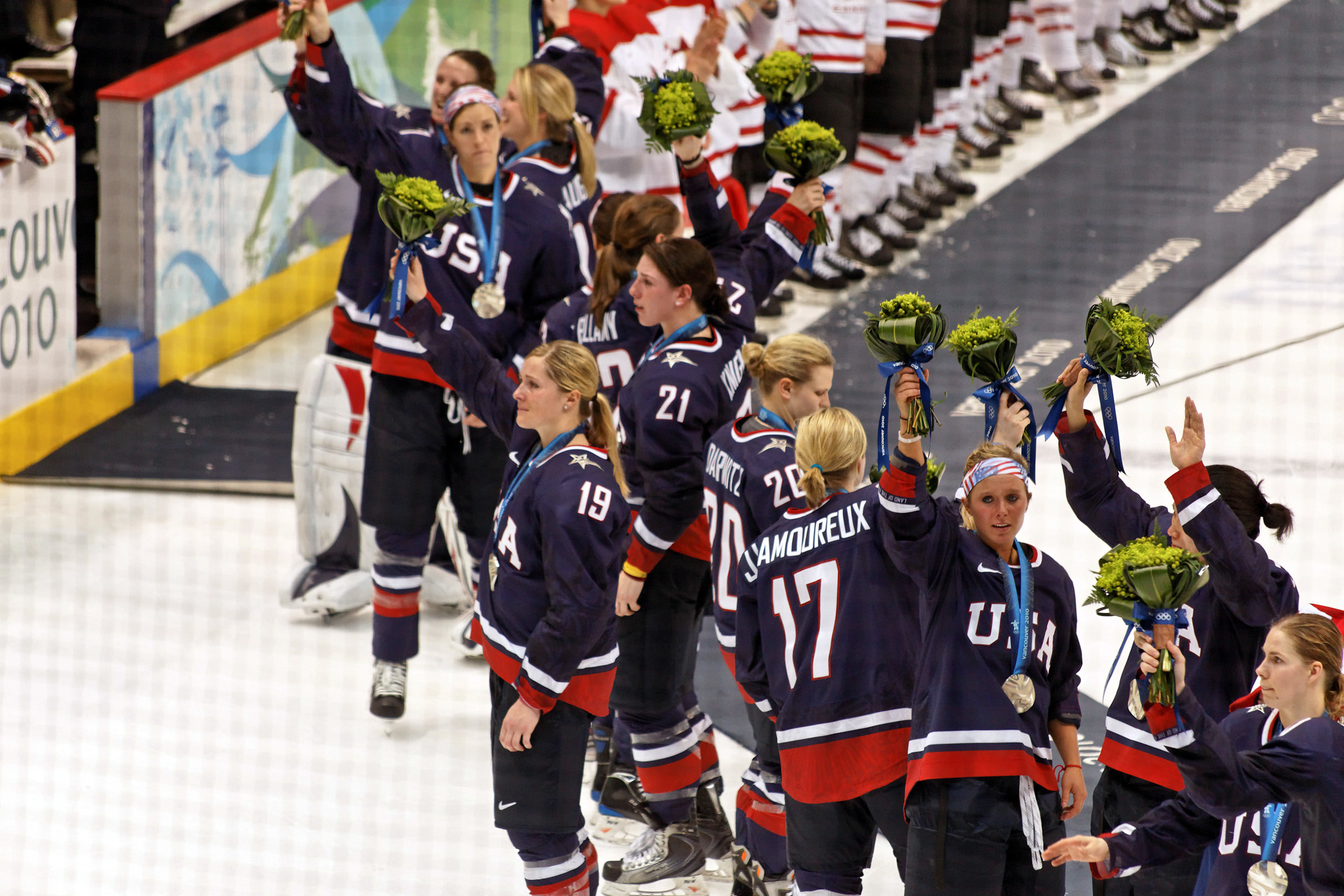
The American women acknowledge the crowd in Vancouver after winning silver medals at the 2010 Winter Olympics.

Women's ice hockey tournaments have been staged at the Olympic Games since 1998. The United States women's national ice hockey team has participated in every tournament since then. National teams are coordinated by USA Hockey and players are chosen by the team's management staff. Ten goaltenders and seventy-three skaters have played for the United States.

Men's ice hockey was introduced at the 1920 Summer Olympics and added to the Winter Olympic Games in 1924. In July 1992, the International Olympic Committee (IOC) voted to approve women's hockey as an Olympic event to first be held at the 1998 Winter Olympics. Until 1998, international women's hockey had been dominated by Canada's national team. Canadian teams had won every World Championship; by 1997, however, the American team had improved and was evenly matched with Canada. In thirteen games played between the two teams in 1997, Canada won seven and the United States six. Canada and the United States dominated the preliminary round of the 1998 tournament, and in their head-to-head match during the final round-robin game, the United States won 7–4. The two teams met again in the gold medal game, which the United States won 3–1.

The Canadian and American teams have established a strong rivalry since the 1998 Winter Games, playing each other in the gold medal game in all but one instance. In a rematch between the two at the 2002 Winter Olympics, Canada won 3–2. In the 2006 Olympics, the American team advanced to the semi-finals before falling to Sweden. It marked the first time in international competition that the final would not feature the United States against Canada. The Americans defeated Finland for the bronze medal. The 2010 US team included fifteen players making their Olympic debut. The Americans again met the Canadians in the final, and in a repeat of 2002, the Canadians took the gold, giving the Americans their second silver. The Canadians again won gold in Sochi at the 2014 Winter Olympics in a 3–2 overtime win against the US team. In 2018, at the Olympic Winter Games in PyeongChang, South Korea, the US defeated Canada in the gold medal game, winning 3–2 in a shootout. In the 2022 Winter Olympics in Beijing, the US lost the gold medal game to Canada, by a score of 3–2.

The United States has won two gold medals, four silver medals, and one bronze medal in women's hockey at the Winter Games. Four players (Karyn Bye-Dietz, Natalie Darwitz, Cammi Granato, and Angela Ruggiero) have been inducted into the International Ice Hockey Federation (IIHF) Hall of Fame, while nine individual players and the entire 1998 team have been inducted into the United States Hockey Hall of Fame. Darwitz, Granato, Ruggiero, and Krissy Wendell are also members of the Hockey Hall of Fame. Julie Chu, Hilary Knight, Angela Ruggiero, and Jenny Potter have participated in four tournaments and won four medals. Potter is the all-time leading American scorer in the women's tournament at the Olympics, with 11 goals, 19 assists and 30 points.

== Key ==
Abbreviations
Abbreviation	Definition
HHOF	Hockey Hall of Fame
IIHFHOF	IIHF Hall of Fame
USHHOF	United States Hockey Hall of Fame
USOPHOF	United States Olympic & Paralympic Hall of Fame

== Goaltenders ==
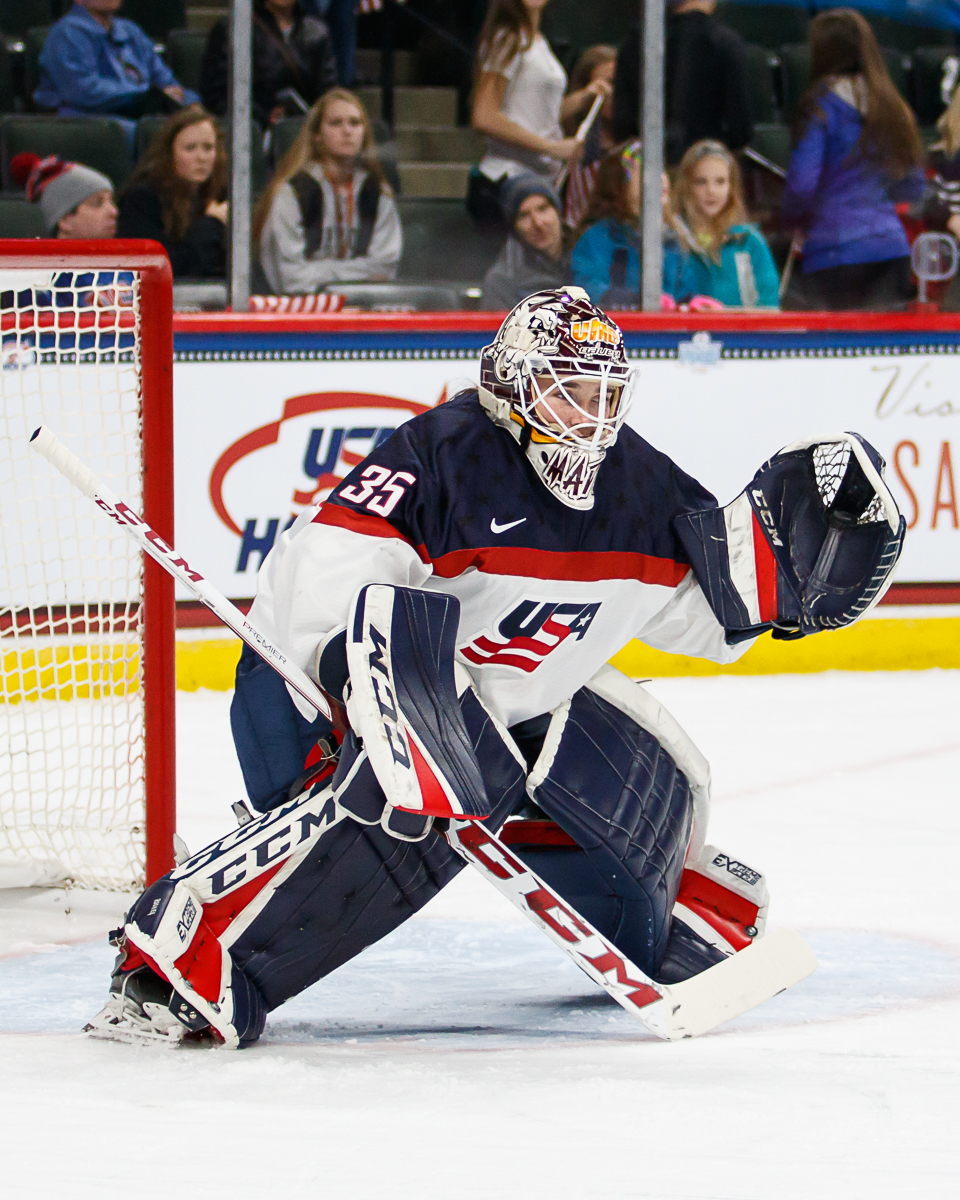
Maddie Rooney led the Americans to a gold medal in 2018.

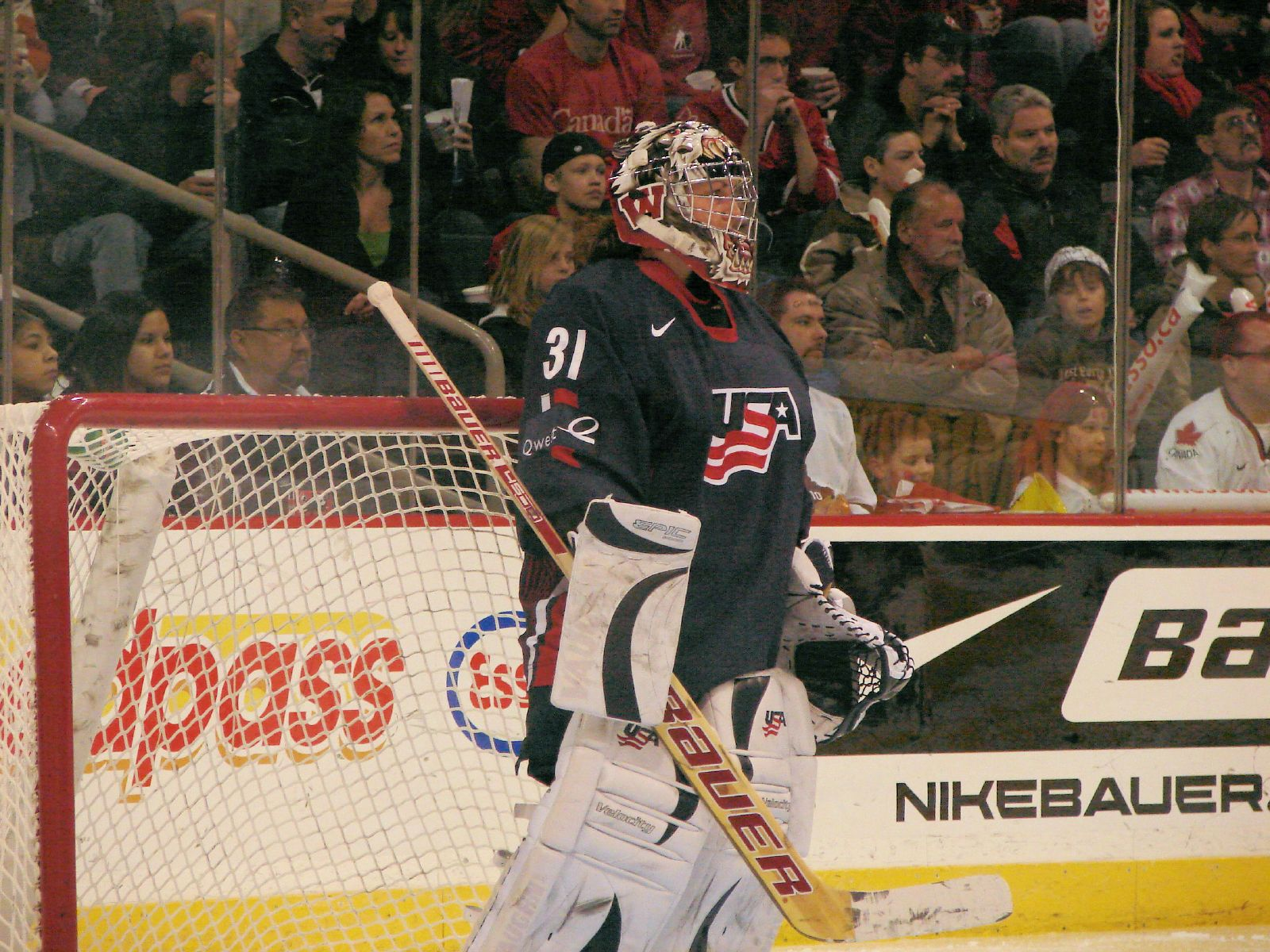
Jessie Vetter won a silver medal in 2010 and 2014.

Note: GP = Games played; Min, TOI = Minutes played; W = Wins; L = Losses; T,T/OT = Ties; GA = Goals-against; GAA = Goals-against average; SO = Shutouts; SV% = Save percentage;

United States Olympic Goaltenders
Player	Olympics	GP	W	L	T	SO	Min	GA	GAA	Medals	Notes	Ref(s).
Alex Cavallini	2018, 2022	4	3	1	1	1	237	5	1.27	Gold (2018); Silver (2022)		
Sara DeCosta	1998, 2002	6	5	1	0	3	330	7	1.27	Gold (1998); Silver (2002)	USHHOF (2009); USOPHOF (2019)	
Pam Dreyer	2006	1	1	0	0	1	60	0	0.00	Bronze (2006)		
Aerin Frankel	2026	5	5	0	0	3	303	2	0.39	Gold (2026)		
Chanda Gunn	2006	4	3	1	0	1	250	6	1.44	Bronze (2006)		
Nicole Hensley	2018, 2022	2	2	0	0	2	120	0	0.00	Gold (2018); Silver (2022)		
Brianne McLaughlin	2010, 2014	1	0	0	0	0	8	1	7.50	Silver (2010); Silver (2014)		
Ava McNaughton	2026	1	0	0	0	0	2	0	0.00	Gold (2026)		
Gwyneth Philips	2026	2	2	0	0	0	118	1	0.00	Gold (2026)		
Maddie Rooney	2018, 2022	6	4	2	0	1	377	11	1.75	Gold (2018); Silver (2022)		
Molly Schaus	2010, 2014	2	2	0	0	1	112	0	0.00	Silver (2010); Silver (2014)		
Sarah Tueting	1998, 2002	6	5	0	0	2	329	5	0.91	Gold (1998); Silver (2002)	USHHOF (2009); USOPHOF (2019)	
Jessie Vetter	2010, 2014	8	5	3	0	2	486	11	2.7	Silver (2010); Silver (2014)		

== Skaters ==
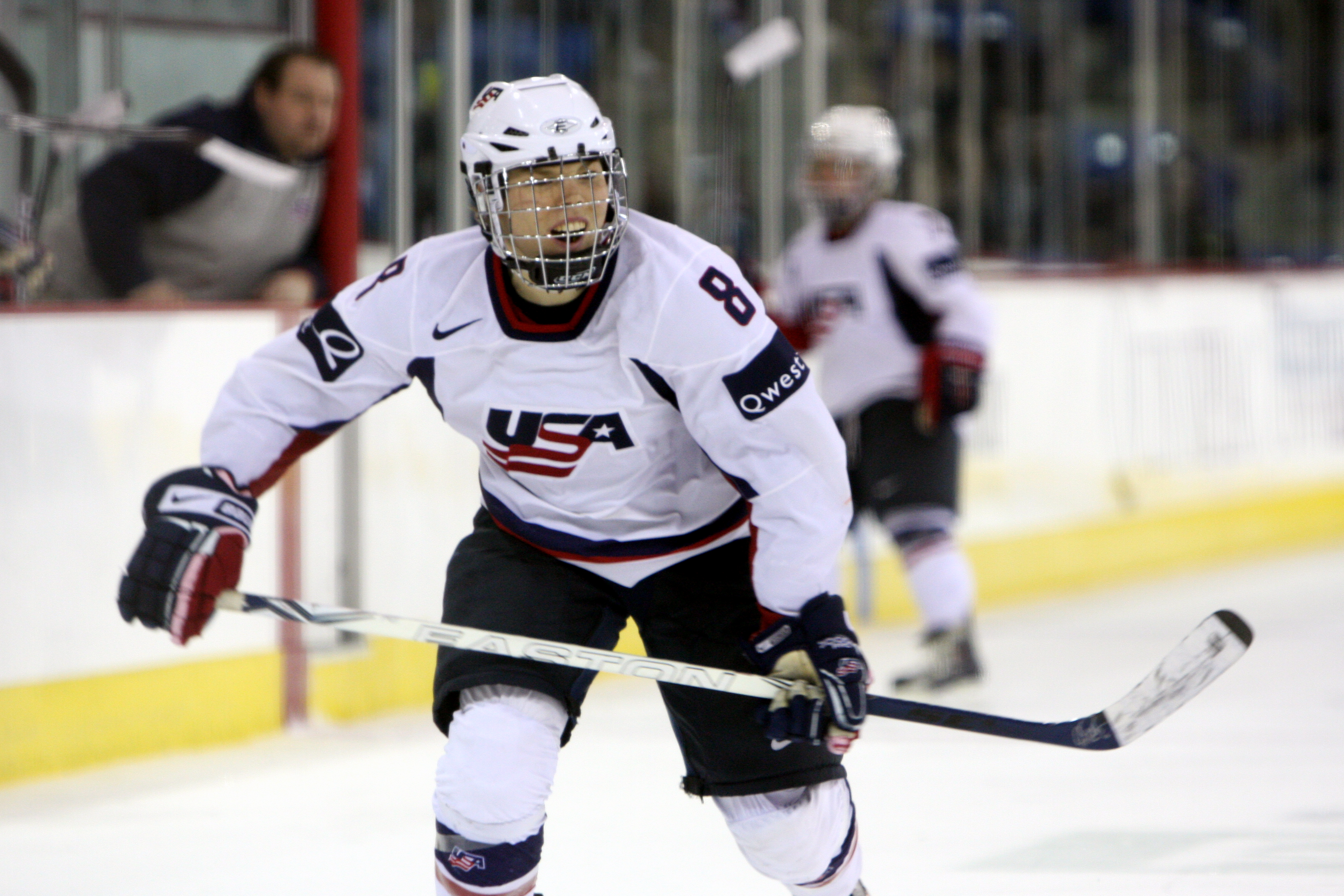
Caitlin Cahow won bronze with the American women in 2006 and added a silver in 2010.

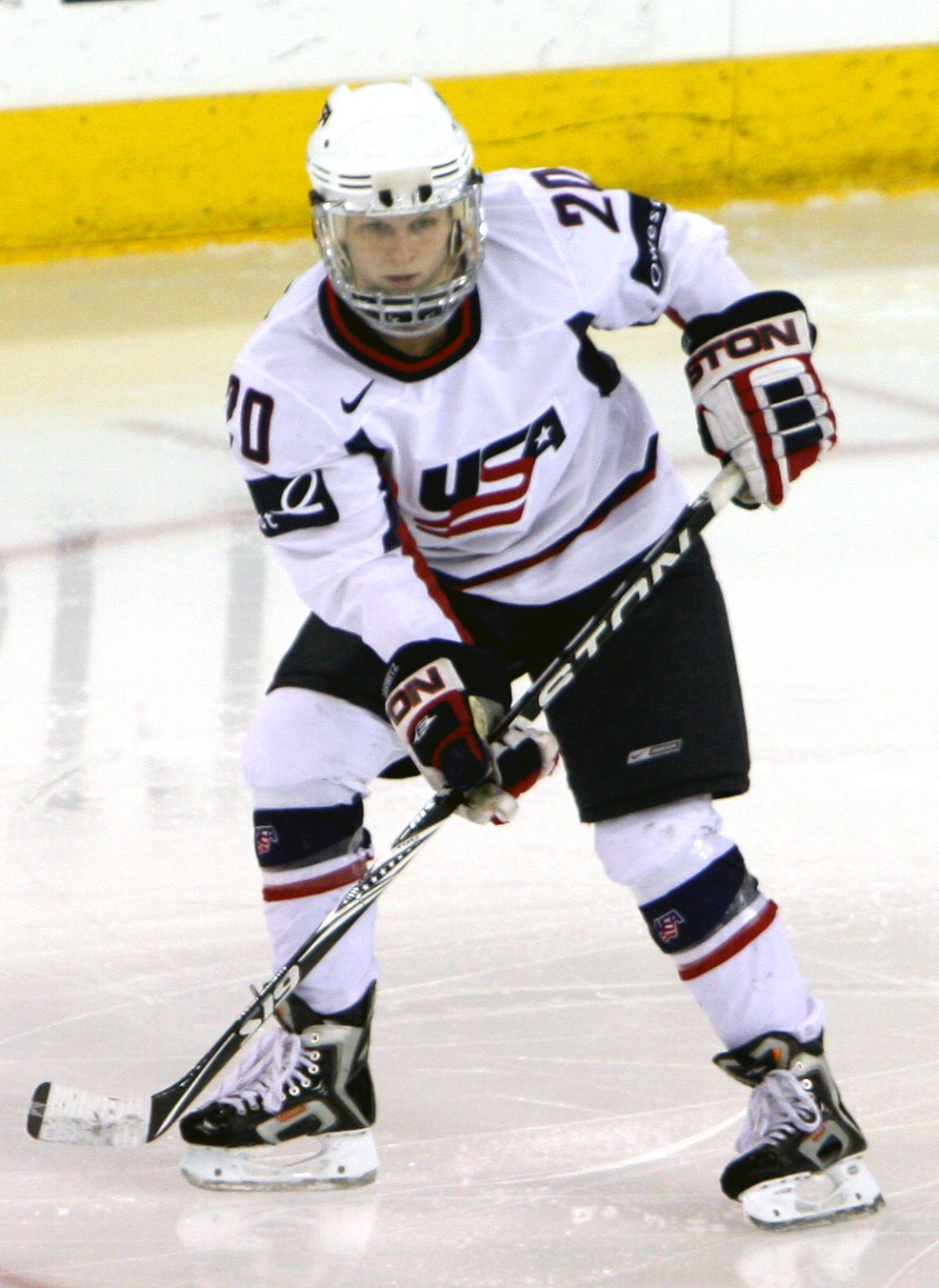
Natalie Darwitz, captain of the 2010 US national team.

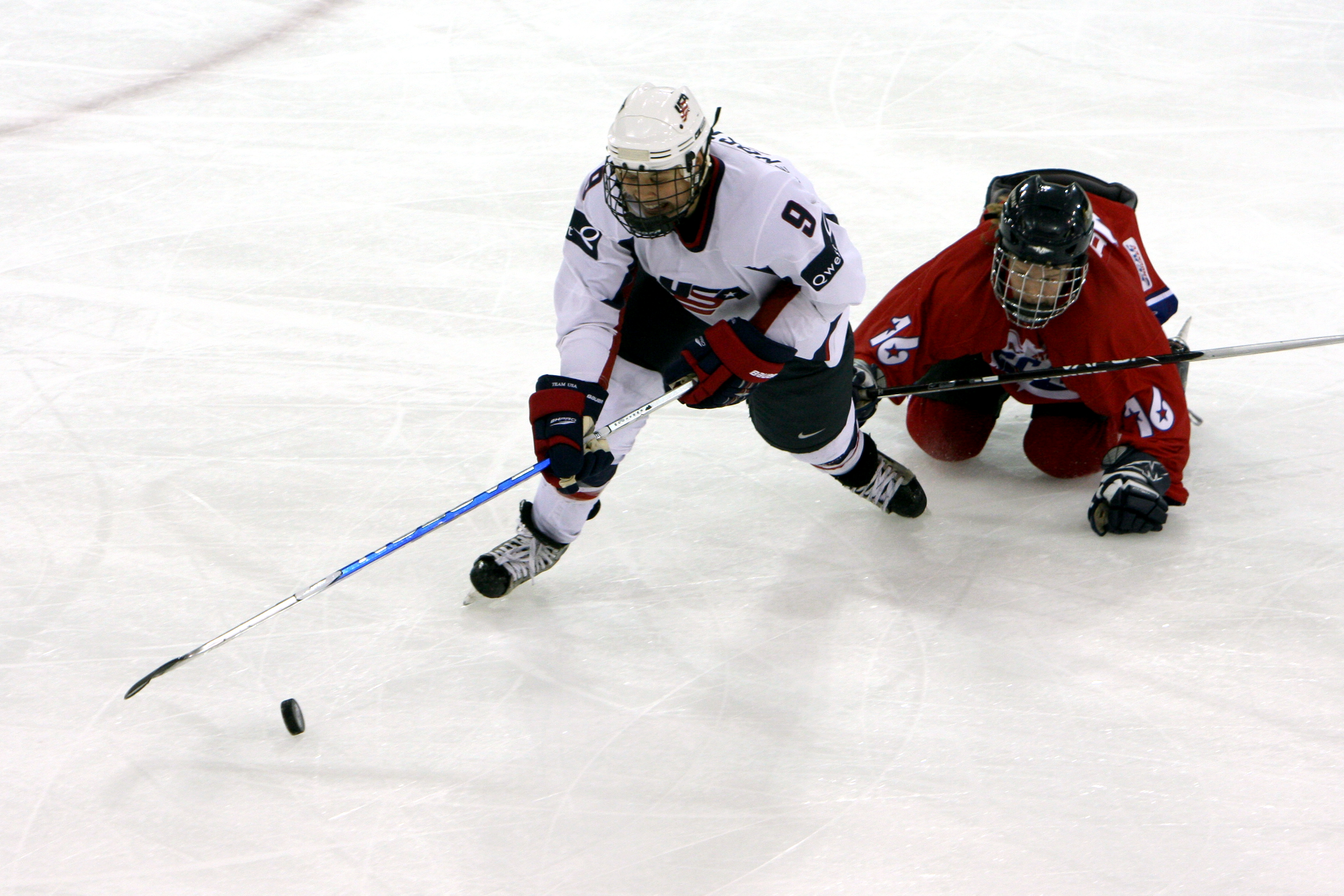
Molly Engstrom has scored seven points in nine Olympic games.

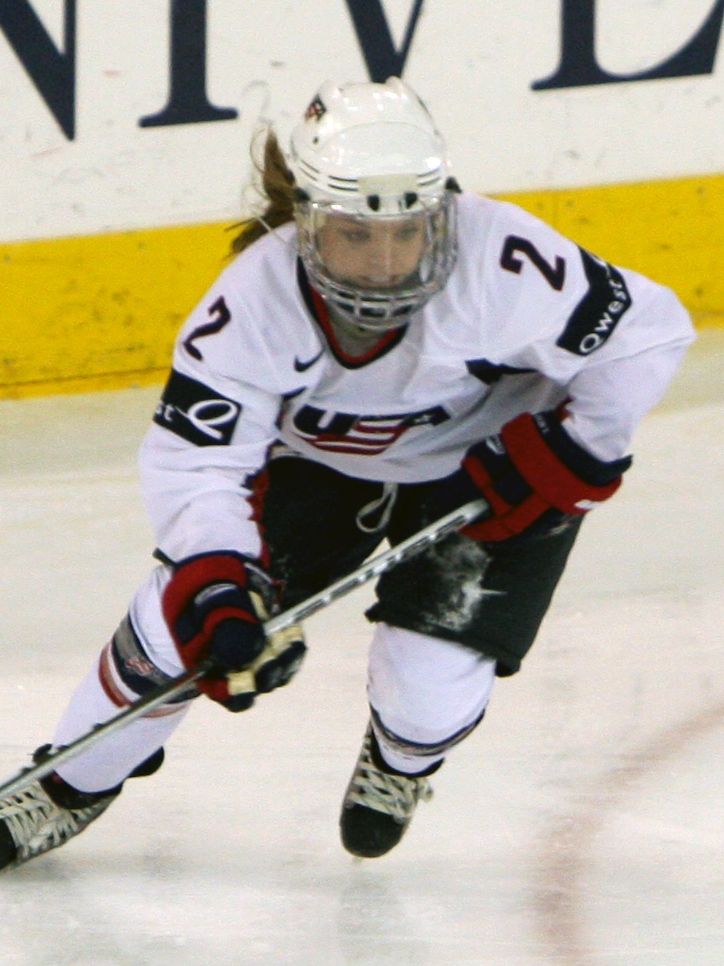
Erika Lawler posted two points in her first Olympics and helped the Americans to a silver medal.

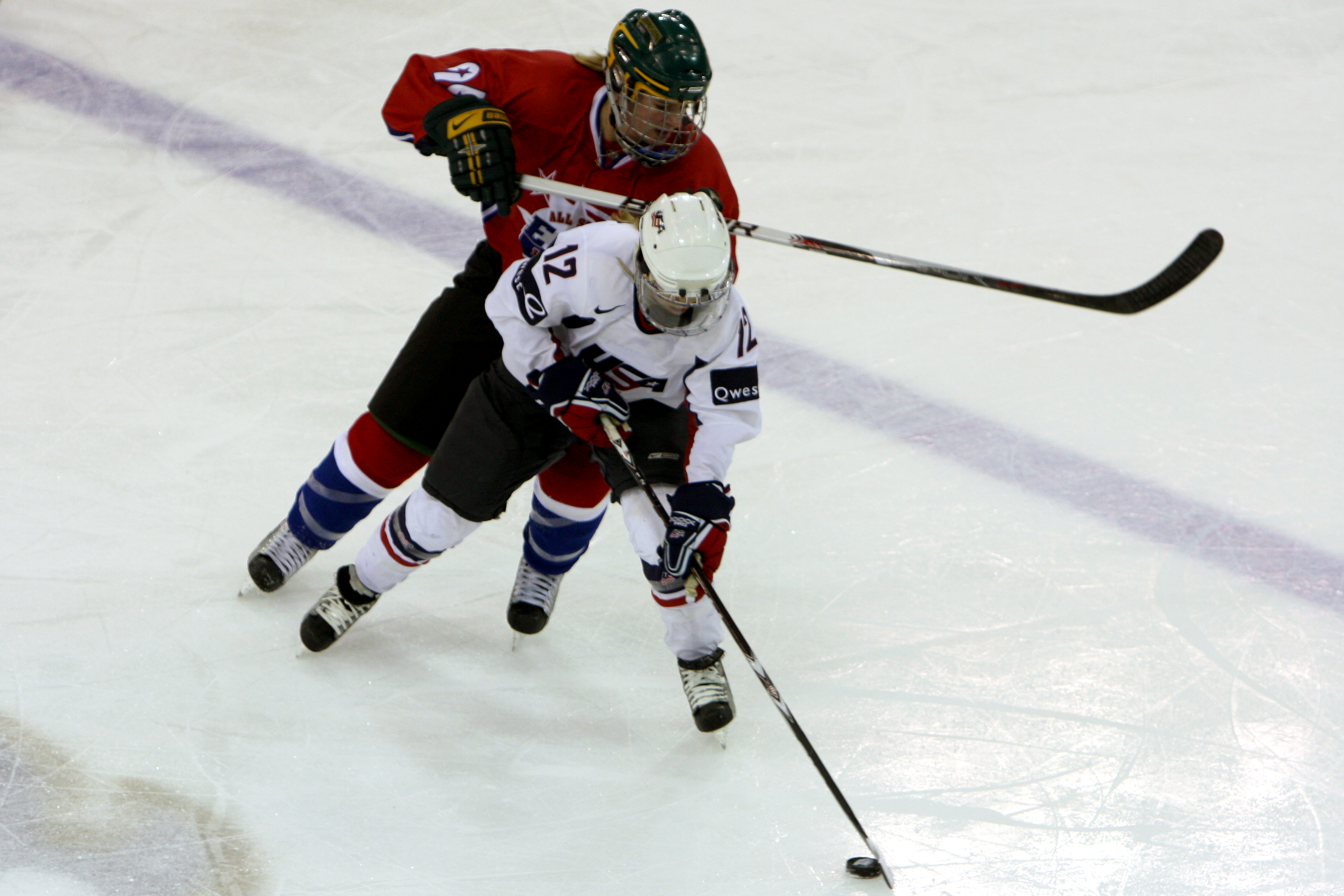
Jenny Schmidgall-Potter is one of only four players to have played for four or more Olympic teams.

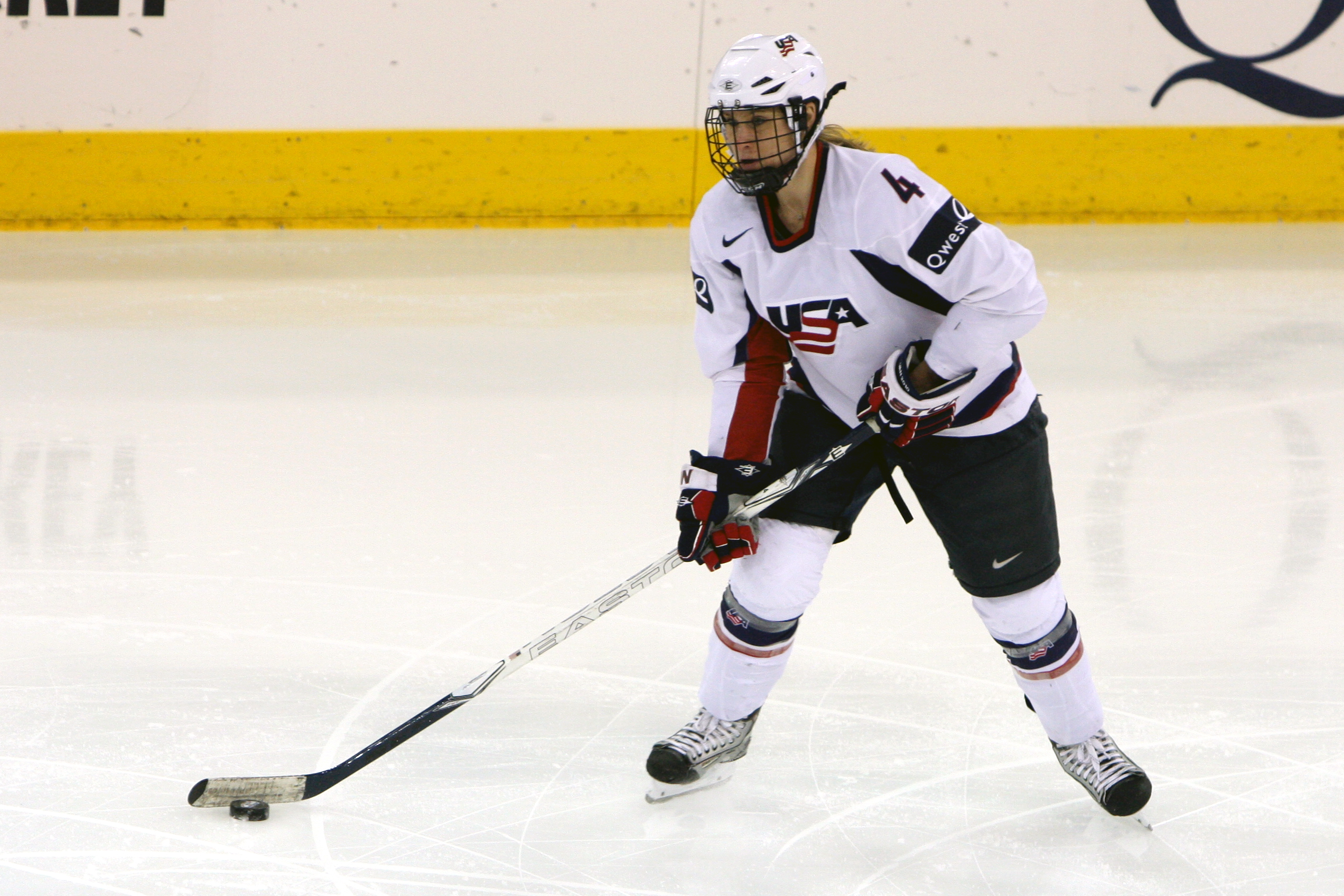
Angela Ruggiero has 6 goals and 9 assists in 21 Olympic games, along with four medals.

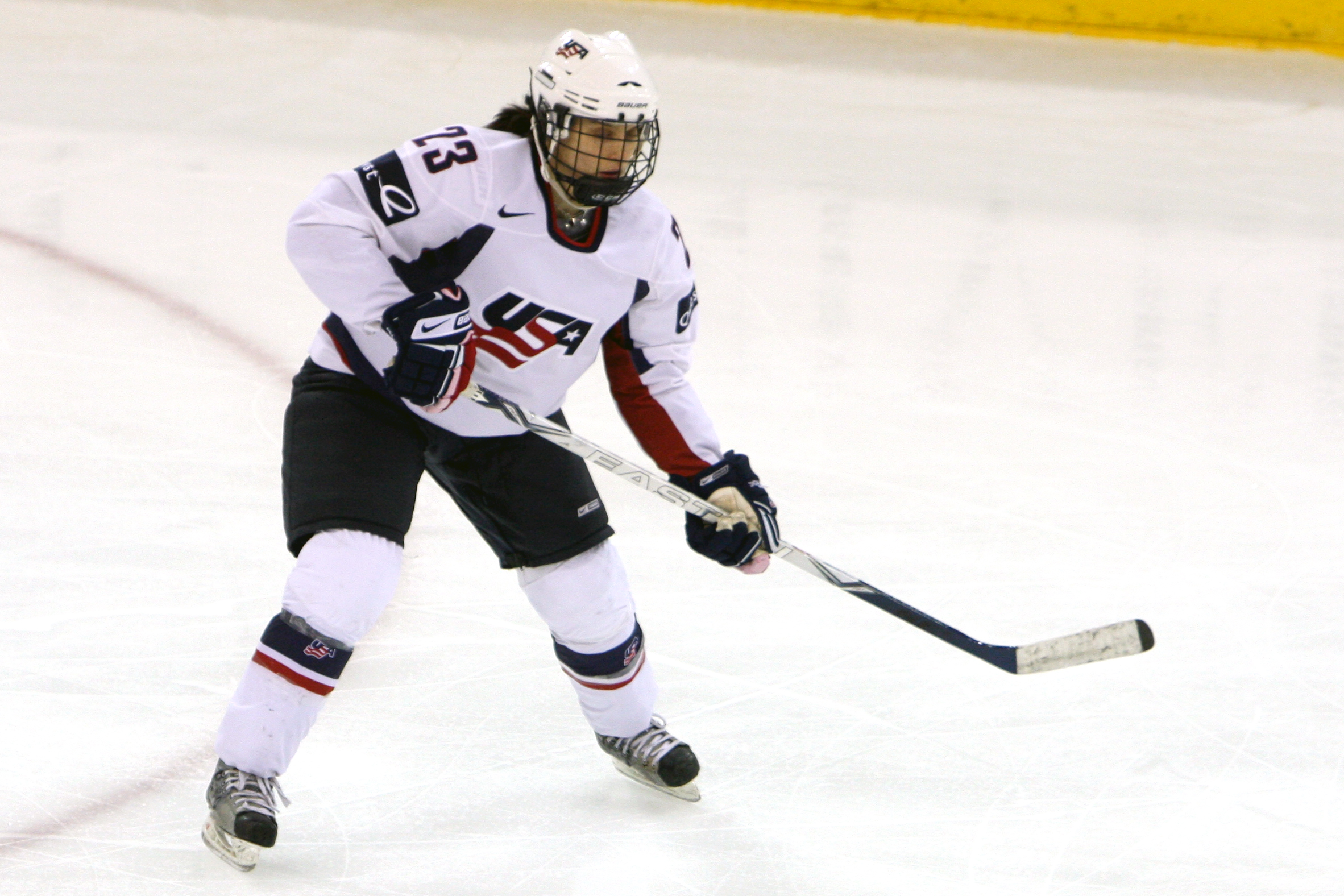
Kerry Weiland made her Olympic debut in Vancouver and won a silver medal.

Note: GP = Games played; G = Goals; A = Assists; Pts = Points; PIM = Penalty minutes;

United States Olympic Skaters
Player	Olympics	GP	G	A	Pts	PIM	Medals	Notes	Ref(s).
Chris Bailey	1998, 2002	11	1	3	4	4	Gold (1998); Silver (2002)	USHHOF (2009); USOPHOF (2019)	
Laurie Baker	1998, 2002	11	7	5	12	10	Gold (1998); Silver (2002)	USHHOF (2009)	
Cayla Barnes	2018, 2022, 2026	19	2	5	7	2	Gold (2018); Silver (2022); Gold (2026)		
Kacey Bellamy	2010, 2014, 2018	15	2	2	4	6	Silver (2010); Silver (2014); Gold (2018)		
Hannah Bilka	2026	7	4	3	7	0	Gold (2026)		
Alana Blahoski	1998	6	0	2	2	0	Gold (1998)	USHHOF (2009); USOPHOF (2019)	
Megan Bozek	2014, 2022	12	1	7	8	0	Silver (2014); Silver (2022)		
Hannah Brandt	2018, 2022	12	1	7	8	4	Gold (2018); Silver (2022)		
Lisa Brown-Miller	1998	6	1	2	3	2	Gold (1998)	USHHOF (2009); USOPHOF (2019)	
Karyn Bye	1998, 2002	11	8	6	14	4	Gold (1998); Silver (2002)	USHHOF (2009, 2014); IIHFHOF (2011); USOPHOF (2019)	
Caitlin Cahow	2006, 2010	10	2	2	4	12	Bronze (2006); Silver (2010)		
Dani Cameranesi	2018, 2022	12	5	3	8	7	Gold (2018); Silver (2022)		
Alex Carpenter	2014, 2022, 2026	19	11	7	18	2	Silver(2014); Silver(2022); Gold (2026)		
Lisa Chesson	2010	5	2	3	5	2	Silver (2010)		
Julie Chu	2002, 2006, 2010, 2014	15	4	8	12	10	Silver (2002); Bronze (2006); Silver (2010); Silver (2014)		
Jesse Compher	2022	7	3	1	4	4	Silver (2022)		
Colleen Coyne	1998	6	0	0	0	4	Gold (1998)	USHHOF (2009); USOPHOF (2019)	
Kendall Coyne	2014, 2018, 2022, 2026	24	10	8	18	6	Silver (2014); Gold (2018); Silver (2022); Gold (2026)		
Britta Curl-Salemme	2026	7	1	5	6	2	Gold (2026)		
Natalie Darwitz	2002, 2006, 2010	15	14	9	23	17	Silver (2002); Bronze (2006); Silver (2010)	Team Captain (2010); USHHOF (2018); IIHFHOF (2024); HHOF (2024)	
Brianna Decker	2014, 2018, 2022	11	2	7	9	12	Silver (2014); Gold (2018); Silver (2022)	HHOF (2025)	
Meghan Duggan	2010, 2014, 2018	15	5	3	8	4	Silver (2010); Silver (2014); Gold (2018)	Team Captain (2014, 2018)	
Tricia Dunn-Luoma	1998, 2002, 2006	16	2	0	2	49	Gold (1998); Silver (2002); Bronze (2006)	USHHOF (2009); USOPHOF (2019)	
Joy Dunne	2026	7	2	3	5	2	Gold (2026)		
Laila Edwards	2026	7	2	6	8	2	Gold (2026)		
Molly Engstrom	2006, 2010	9	3	4	7	10	Bronze (2006); Silver (2010)		
Kali Flanagan	2018	5	0	0	0	0	Gold (2018)		
Lyndsey Fry	2014	5	0	0	0	0	Silver (2014)		
Cammi Granato	1998, 2002	11	10	8	18	0	Gold (1998); Silver (2002)	Team Captain (1998, 2002); IIHFHOF (2008); USHHOF (2008, 2009); HHOF (2010); USOPHOF (2019)	
Rory Guilday	2026	7	0	0	0	4	Gold (2026)		
Jamie Hagerman	2006	5	0	0	0	2	Bronze (2006)		
Savannah Harmon	2022	7	2	5	7	0	Silver (2022)		
Caroline Harvey	2022, 2026	14	2	7	9	2	Silver (2022); Gold (2026)		
Taylor Heise	2026	7	2	3	5	2	Gold (2026)		
Kim Insalaco	2006	5	0	0	0	4	Bronze (2006)		
Tessa Janecke	2026	7	0	5	5	0	Gold (2026)		
Kathleen Kauth	2006	5	0	0	0	2	Bronze (2006)		
Megan Keller	2018, 2022, 2026	19	3	12	15	6	Gold(2018); Silver (2022); Gold (2026)		
Courtney Kennedy	2002, 2006	10	0	2	2	12	Silver (2002); Bronze (2006)		
Amanda Kessel	2014, 2018, 2022	17	6	9	15	0	Silver (2014); Gold (2018); Silver (2022)		
Andrea Kilbourne	2002	5	1	1	2	2	Silver (2002)		
Katie King	1998, 2002, 2006	16	11	9	20	6	Gold (1998); Silver (2002); Bronze (2006)	USHHOF (2009, 2023); USOPHOF (2019)	
Kristin King	2006	5	0	0	0	4	Bronze (2006)		
Hilary Knight	2010, 2014, 2018, 2022, 2026	29	15	18	33	10	Silver (2010); Silver (2014); Gold (2018); Silver (2022); Gold (2026)	Team captain (2026)	
Jocelyne Lamoureux	2010, 2014, 2018	15	6	10	16	4	Silver (2010); Silver (2014); Gold (2018)	USHHOF (2022)	
Monique Lamoureux	2010, 2014, 2018	15	9	7	16	8	Silver (2010); Silver (2014); Gold (2018)	USHHOF (2022)	
Erika Lawler	2010	4	0	2	2	0	Silver (2010)		
Shelley Looney	1998, 2002	11	5	3	8	4	Gold (1998); Silver (2002)	USHHOF (2009); USOPHOF (2019)	
Gigi Marvin	2010, 2014, 2018	15	2	5	7	4	Silver (2010); Silver (2014); Gold (2018)		
Sue Merz	1998, 2002	10	2	5	7	6	Gold (1998); Silver (2002)	USHHOF (2009); USOPHOF (2019)	
Allison Mleczko	1998, 2002	11	3	5	8	10	Gold (1998); Silver (2002)	USHHOF (2009); USOPHOF (2019)	
Sidney Morin	2018	5	0	2	2	0	Gold (2018)		
Tara Mounsey	1998, 2002	11	2	11	13	16	Gold (1998); Silver (2002)	USHHOF (2009); USOPHOF (2019)	
Vicki Movsessian	1998	6	1	0	1	10	Gold (1998)	USHHOF (2009); USOPHOF (2019)	
Abbey Murphy	2022, 2026	14	2	6	8	14	Silver (2022); Gold (2026)		
Kelly Pannek	2018, 2022, 2026	19	2	8	10	2	Gold (2018); Silver (2022); Gold (2026)		
Sarah Parsons	2006	5	4	3	7	0	Bronze (2006)		
Amanda Pelkey	2018	5	0	2	2	2	Gold (2018)		
Emily Pfalzer	2018	5	0	0	0	0	Gold (2018)		
Michelle Picard	2014	5	0	0	0	0	Silver (2014)		
Josephine Pucci	2014	5	0	1	1	2	Silver (2014)		
Helen Resor	2006	6	0	0	0	4	Bronze (2006)		
Jincy Roese	2022	7	0	3	3	0	Silver (2022)		
Abby Roque	2022	7	1	2	3	4	Silver (2022)		
Angela Ruggiero	1998, 2002, 2006, 2010	21	6	9	15	38	Gold (1998); Silver (2002); Bronze (2006); Silver (2010)	USHHOF (2009, 2015); IIHFHOF (2017); HHOF (2015); USOPHOF (2019)	
Hayley Scamurra	2022, 2026	14	4	2	6	6	Silver (2022); Gold (2026)		
Anne Schleper	2014	5	1	2	3	2	Silver (2014)		
Jenny Schmidgall-Potter	1998, 2002, 2006, 2010	21	11	19	30	12	Gold (1998); Silver (2002); Bronze (2006); Silver (2010)	USHHOF (2009, 2020); USOPHOF (2019)	
Kirsten Simms	2026	7	1	0	1	6	Gold (2026)		
Haley Skarupa	2018	5	0	0	0	0	Gold (2018)		
Kelli Stack	2010, 2014	10	4	9	13	4	Silver (2010); Silver(2014)		
Lee Stecklein	2014, 2018, 2022, 2026	24	1	3	4	2	Silver (2014); Gold (2018); Silver (2022); Gold (2026)		
Kelly Stephens	2006	5	0	2	2	8	Bronze (2006)		
Karen Thatcher	2010	5	3	3	6	2	Silver (2010)		
Gretchen Ulion	1998	6	3	5	8	4	Gold (1998)	USHHOF (2009); USOPHOF (2019)	
Lyndsay Wall	2002	5	0	1	1	4	Silver (2002)		
Kerry Weiland	2010	5	1	1	2	4	Silver (2010)		
Krissy Wendell	2002, 2006	10	4	6	10	6	Silver (2002); Bronze (2006)	Team Captain (2006); USHHOF (2019); HHOF (2024)	
Sandra Whyte	1998	6	2	2	4	0	Gold (1998)	USHHOF (2009); USOPHOF (2019)	
Haley Winn	2026	7	1	3	4	0	Gold (2026)		
Jinelle Zaugg-Siergiej	2010	5	0	0	0	4	Silver (2010)		
Grace Zumwinkle	2022, 2026	14	1	1	2	0	Silver (2022); Gold (2026)		

== See also ==
- List of Olympic men's ice hockey players for the United States
- List of Olympic women's ice hockey players for Finland
- List of Olympic women's ice hockey players for Canada
- List of United States women's national ice hockey team rosters
