= Tracie Ruiz =

American synchronized swimmer (born 1963)

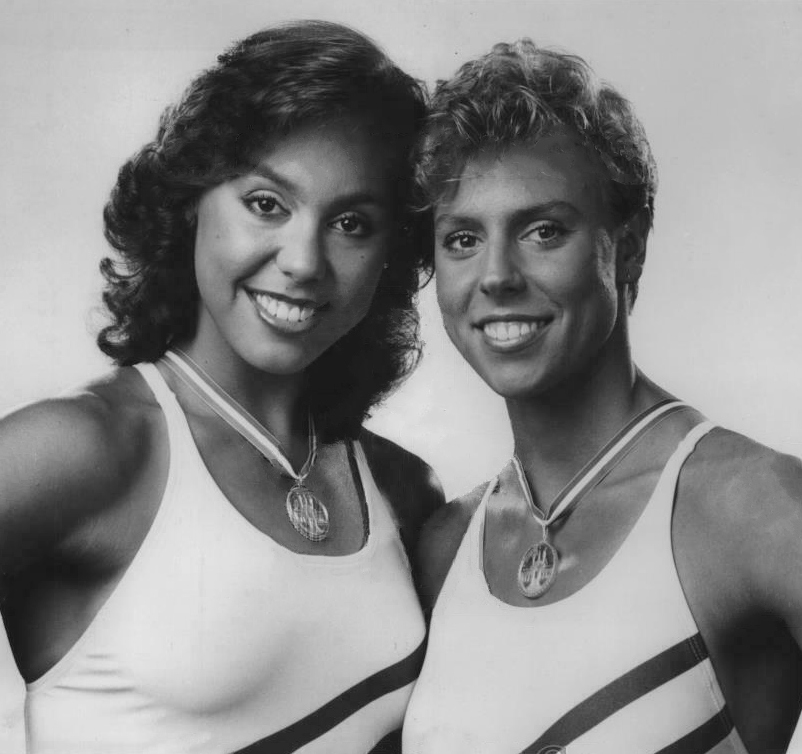
- Ruiz (left) and Costie in 1984

Personal information
- Full name: Tracie Lehuanani Ruiz-Conforto
- National team: United States
- Born: February 4, 1963 (age 63) Honolulu, Hawaii, U.S.
- Height: 5 ft 4 in (1.62 m)
- Weight: 121 lb (55 kg)
- Spouse: Michael Anthony Conforto

Sport
- Sport: Swimming
- Strokes: Synchronized swimming
- Club: Seattle Aqua Club; Arizona Wildcats
- College team: University of Arizona
- Coach: Charlotte Jennings Davis
Medal record
Synchronized swimming
Representing the United States
Olympic Games
Gold medal – first place	1984 Los Angeles	Women's solo
Gold medal – first place	1984 Los Angeles	Women's duet
Silver medal – second place	1988 Seoul	Women's solo
World Championships
Gold medal – first place	1982 Guayaquil	Women's solo
Silver medal – second place	1982 Guayaquil	Women's duet
Pan American Games
Gold medal – first place	1979 San Juan	Women's team
Gold medal – first place	1983 Caracas	Women's solo
Gold medal – first place	1983 Caracas	Women's duet
Gold medal – first place	1987 Indianapolis	Women's solo

Tracie Lehuanani Ruiz (born February 4, 1963), also known after 1985 by her married name Tracie Lehuanani Ruiz-Conforto, is a former American competitive synchronized swimmer for the University of Arizona who won a total of three Olympic medals with a gold in both the duet and solo event at the 1984 Los Angeles Olympics, the first to feature synchronized swimming, and a silver in the solo event at the 1988 Seoul Olympics.

== Early competition ==
Ruiz was born February 4, 1963, in Honolulu, Hawaii. By the age of nine, she trained with Charlotte Davis's Seattle Aqua Club in Seattle, Washington. Around the age of ten, Ruiz was paired with a young Candace Costie by Charlotte Davis and the duet team won the Junior National Duet title in 1979. By 1982, when the International Olympic Committee announced they would include the duet event in the upcoming 1984 Olympic Games, Coach Davis, Ruiz, and Costie set a goal to train for the 1984 Olympics. In 1984, Davis stopped coaching at the Seattle Aqua Club to train Ruiz and Costie full time.

Ruiz competed in synchronized swimming for the University of Arizona team with fellow duet teammate Candace Costie. Costie and Ruiz won the duet event at the 1982 National Collegiate Championships. A powerful program, the Arizona team competed in the Association of Intercollegiate Athletics for Women (AIAW) Championships in 1981 and 1984. The Arizona team was coached by Kathy Kretschmer, who had formerly competed for the U.S. Junior and Senior National Teams and won a gold medal at the 1971 Pan American Games.

Tracie excelled in both solo and duet routines, winning a total of 41 gold medals during her career at the national and international level. In the women's solo event, Ruiz achieved consecutive victories at the 1983 and 1987 Pan American Games. Her training included taking jazz ballet, weight training, and swimming 75 meters underwater to build rhythm, strength, and underwater endurance.

She enjoyed a successful continuing partnership with fellow American, Candy Costie, which included a silver medal in the women's duet at the 1982 World Aquatics Championships in Guayaquil. Over the next few years, they increased their medal haul, winning gold at the 1983 Pan American Games.

== 1984, 1988 Olympic medals ==
Tracie's former coach Charlotte Davis was selected as the U.S. Olympic Head Coach for synchronized swimming in 1984. Achieving her goal, Tracie became the inaugural champion of the first Olympic synchronized swimming competition at the 1984 Summer Olympics in Los Angeles, winning gold medals in the solo event and in the duet, with long-time partner Candie Costie. In the dual event, Costie and Ruiz took the gold defeating the Canadian duet team of Sharon Hambrook and Kelly Kryczka, in a close competition. Ruiz later dominated the solo event, with her primary competition, Sharon Hambrook and Kelly Kryczka of Canada, not qualifying for the Olympic finals. In the Olympic final for the solo event, Ruiz defeated Carolyn Waldo of Canada who took the silver, and Miwako Motoyoshi of Japan who took the bronze. She intended to retire after the 1984 Olympics, and competed in bodybuilding for a time.

After returning to competition in 1987, Tracie had an exceptional performance at the 1988 U.S. Olympic Trials, receiving all 10s and five 9.9s for technical merit in her final qualifying routine. Ruiz-Conforto narrowly missed winning a second gold at the 1988 Summer Olympics in Seoul, Korea, settling for silver in the solo event after having been beaten by her Canadian rival, Carolyn Waldo. Her domination of the event at the national level resulted in first place at all six US championships between 1981 and 1986.

== Personal life ==
In June 1985, she married Michael Anthony Conforto, a former Penn State football player who had helped her train for the Olympics. Their son, Michael Conforto, played professional baseball for the New York Mets from 2015 until 2021 and is currently a member of the Chicago Cubs. Their daughter, Jacqueline, played soccer at Azusa Pacific University.

== Honors ==
Tracie Ruiz was inducted into the International Swimming Hall of Fame in Fort Lauderdale, Florida in 1993. She was nominated and became a finalist for induction into the U.S. Olympic Hall of Fame in 2012.

== See also ==
- List of members of the International Swimming Hall of Fame
