= Pat Ramage =

Canadian skiing executive (1922–2003)

Patricia Marie Ramage CM
- Born: June 21, 1922; Vancouver, British Columbia, Canada
- Died: January 13, 2003 (aged 80); Montreal, Quebec, Canada
- Occupations: Skiing executive; sports administrator
- Years active: 1953–1983
- Known for: First woman to lead an Olympic skiing team; Canadian Olympic Association executive
- Awards: Member of the Order of Canada (1989); Queen Elizabeth II Golden Jubilee Medal (2002)

Patricia Marie Ramage CM (21 June 1922 — 13 January 2003) was a Canadian skiing executive. As a member of the Canadian Olympic Association between 1953 and 1976, Ramage managed the Canadian skiing team that went to the FIS Alpine World Ski Championships 1954, 1956 Winter Olympics, and FIS Alpine World Ski Championships 1958. While with the COA, Ramage became a member of the Federation Internationale de Ski in 1961 and judged from 1966 to 1977. Some of the events that Ramage judged at include the FIS Alpine World Ski Championships 1960, 1964 Winter Olympics and FIS Alpine World Ski Championships 1970.

Apart from skiing, Ramage started the first Canadian biathlon team that attended the Biathlon World Championships 1978. From 1978 to 1983, she held executive roles for Modern Penthalon Canada and Biathlon Canada. Ramage was inducted into the Canada's Sports Hall of Fame in 1984 and the Canadian Ski Hall of Fame in 1989. Ramage was also named a Member of the Order of Canada in 1989.

== Biography ==
On 21 June 1922, Ramage was born in Vancouver, British Columbia. Ramage was a member of the Canadian Olympic Association between 1953 and 1976. During this time period, she led the Canadian skiing team that went to the FIS Alpine World Ski Championships 1954 and FIS Alpine World Ski Championships 1958. At the Olympics, Ramage was named manager of the Canadian women's ski team for the 1956 Winter Olympics. Upon her appointment, Ramage became the first woman to ever lead an Olympic skiing team. Later on, Ramage was selected as a chaperone for the Canadian skiing team that went to the 1968 Winter Olympics. At the 1972 Winter Olympics, she was an Assistant Chef de Mission with Canada.

As an executive, Ramage represented the Canadian Ski Association as director between 1962 and 1972. While with the COA, Ramage became the first Canadian committee member of the Federation Internationale de Ski in 1961. She was a judge at the FIS Alpine World Ski Championships 1960, FIS Alpine World Ski Championships 1970, and various FIS Alpine Ski World Cup races from 1966 to 1977. During her judging tenure, Ramage became the first Olympic Canadian judge at the 1964 Winter Olympics. Outside of skiing, Ramage assembled the Canadian competitors that went to the Biathlon World Championships 1978. Between 1978 and 1983, Ramage worked at Modern Penthalon Canada as an honorary treasurer. During her tenure, she became the chair for Biathlon Canada in 1981 and simultaneously held her executive roles until 1983.

Ramage was named Member of the Order of Canada in 1989 and awarded the Queen Elizabeth II Golden Jubilee Medal in 2002. For hall of fames, Ramage was inducted into the Canada's Sports Hall of Fame in 1984 and the Canadian Olympic Hall of Fame in 1985. She was later named into the Canadian Ski Hall of Fame in 1989. On 13 January 2003, Ramage died in Montreal, Quebec.
