= Claudia Novelo =

Mexican synchronized swimmer

Personal information
- Nationality: Mexico
- Born: 9 August 1965 (age 60)
- Height: 1.60 m (5 ft 3 in)
- Weight: 48 kg (106 lb)

Sport
- Sport: Swimming
- Strokes: Synchronized swimming
Medal record
Representing Mexico
Synchronized swimming
Pan American Games
Bronze medal – third place	1983 Caracas	Duet
- Updated on 19 November 2014

Claudia Novelo (born August 9, 1965) is a retired Mexican competitor in women's synchronized swimming. She represented her native country at the 1984 Summer Olympics, and claimed the bronze medal in the women's duet at the 1983 Pan American Games in Caracas alongside Pilar Ramírez.
