= Pilar Ramírez =

Mexican synchronized swimmer

Personal information
- Full name: Pilar Ramírez Laguna
- Nationality: Mexico
- Born: 28 February 1964
- Died: 24 May 2017 (aged 53)
- Height: 1.70 m (5 ft 7 in)
- Weight: 55 kg (121 lb)

Sport
- Sport: Swimming
- Strokes: Synchronized swimming
Medal record
Representing Mexico
Synchronized swimming
Pan American Games
Bronze medal – third place	1983 Caracas	Duet4

Pilar Ramírez Laguna (February 28, 1964 – May 24, 2017) was a Mexican competitor in women's synchronized swimming. She represented her native country at the 1984 Summer Olympics, and claimed the bronze medal in duet at the 1983 Pan American Games in Caracas alongside Claudia Novelo.
