= Vicky Vilagos =

Canadian synchronized swimmer

Personal information
- Nationality: Canada
- Born: 17 April 1963 (age 63) Brampton, Canada
- Height: 165 cm (5 ft 5 in)
- Weight: 51 kg (112 lb)

Sport
- Sport: Swimming
- Strokes: Synchronised swimming
- Club: CAMO Natation
Medal record
Women's Synchronised swimming
Representing Canada
Olympic Games
Silver medal – second place	1992 Barcelona	Women's duet
World Aquatics Championships
Gold medal – first place	1982 Guayaquil	Team
Pan American Games
Silver medal – second place	1983 Caracas	Women's duet

Vicky Vilagos (born April 17, 1963) is a Canadian competitor in synchronised swimming and an Olympic medalist.

== Career ==
Vilagos and her twin sister Penny Vilagos began synchronized swimming at age eight. They won their first Canadian National Championship in duet at age seventeen, they would go on to win five more national titles. Vicky Vilagos and Penny Vilagos won a silver medal in the women's duet at the 1983 Pan American Games. They retired from synchronized swimming in 1985 after failing to make the 1984 Olympic team. In 1990 Vicky and Penny came out of retirement going on to win a silver medal in the women's duet at the 1992 Summer Olympics.

== Honours ==
Vilagos was inducted into the Canadian Olympic Hall of Fame in 2002. In 2014 Vilagos was inducted into the International Swimming Hall of Fame.
