= Synchronized swimming at the 1983 Pan American Games =

- No. of events: 3

Synchronized swimming at the 1983 Pan American Games was held from 14 August to 29 August 1983 in Caracas, Venezuela. There were three medal events. After five Pan Am wins in a row, the United States was upset in the Women's Team event by Canada.

== Medal table ==
Rank	Nation	Gold	Silver	Bronze	Total
1	United States (USA)	2	1	0	3
2	Canada (CAN)	1	2	0	3
3	Mexico (MEX)	0	0	2	2
4	Venezuela (VEN)	0	0	1	1
Totals (4 entries)		3	3	3	9

== Medalists ==
Event	Gold		Silver		Bronze	
Solo	Tracie Ruiz; United States	190.499	Sharon Hambrook; Canada	187.066	Ana Amicarella; Venezuela	166.683
Duet	United States (USA); Candy Costie; Tracie Ruiz	188.550	Canada (CAN); Penny Vilagos; Vicky Vilagos	187.233	Mexico (MEX); Claudia Novelo; Pilar Ramírez	165.142
Team	Canada (CAN)	188.427	United States (USA); Karen Callaghan; Candy Costie; Karen Josephson; Sarah Josephson; Becky Roy; Tracie Ruiz; Holly Spencer; Mary Visniski	186.444	Mexico (MEX)	163.900
