= Candy Costie =

American synchronized swimmer

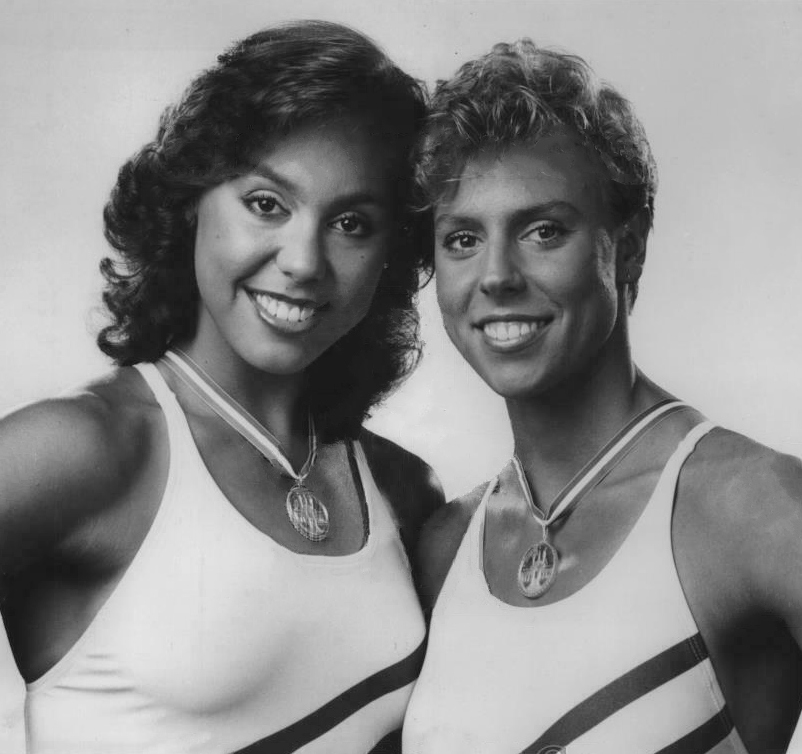
- Ruiz and Costie (right) in 1984

Personal information
- Full name: Candace Costie
- Nickname: "Candy"
- National team: United States
- Born: March 12, 1963 (age 63) Seattle, Washington, U.S.
- Height: 5 ft 4 in (1.62 m)
- Weight: 110 lb (50 kg)
- Spouses: Doug Burke, Fred Merrill, Jr.

Sport
- Sport: Swimming
- Strokes: Synchronised swimming Solo, duet, team
- Club: Washington Athletic Club; Seattle Aqua Club (SAC); Arizona Wildcats, U.S.
- Coach: Charlotte Jennings Davis (SAC, Olympics)
Medal record
Synchronised swimming
Representing the United States
Olympic Games
| Gold medal – first place | 1984 Los Angeles | Women's duet |
World Aquatics Championships
| Silver medal – second place | 1982 Guayaquil | Women's duet |
Pan American Games
| Gold medal – first place | 1983 Caracas | Women's duet |

Candace (Candy) Costie, (born March 12, 1963) known by her married name Candace Costie Merrill since 1995, is an American former synchronized swimming competitor who competed for the University of Arizona, and was a 1984 Los Angeles Olympic gold medal winner in the duet event. She later worked as a broadcaster for sporting events, and in real estate development for her husband's Merrill Company.

== Early life and competition ==
Candace Costie was born on March 12, 1963, in Seattle, Washington where she spent her early life. Her mother was a diver and frequent swimmer, and Costie began swimming at nearby Green Lake, then around eight or nine started training with the Washington Athletic Club in downtown Seattle, which had offered synchronized swimming. Though initially trained as a competitive swimmer, she soon switched to synchronized swimming as she enjoyed the music, creativity, and rhythmic movements.

=== Seattle Aqua Club ===
Around 1973–74, Costie's coaches Gail Brennan and Diann Smith moved from the Washington Athletic Club where they were Costie's first synchronized swimming instructors, to the Seattle Aqua Club where Tracy Ruiz was already being coached by Seattle Aqua Club's Head Coach Charlotte Davis. Costie began training with Hall of Fame Coach Charlotte Davis, a former 1970 National Team Champion, who paired her with a young Tracie Ruiz. Showing early promise, Costie won a gold medal at the Junior Olympic Championship in 1977 and both an individual and duet title at the U.S. Junior Championships in 1979 around the age of sixteen. Costie and Ruiz had similar builds and weights, 5' 4" heights, deep tans, similar toothy smiles, were the same age and had comparable swimming skills. The combination of traits made them a suitable match for a duet team.

By 1982, when the International Olympic Committee announced they would include the duet event in the upcoming 1984 Olympic Games, Coach Davis, Ruiz, and Costie set a goal to focus their training on an Olympic berth and medal. In 1984, Davis temporarily stopped coaching at the Seattle Aqua Club to train Ruiz and Costie full time for the Olympics. An important player in the growth of synchronized swimming, Davis was instrumental in the formation of the U.S. Synchronized Swimming Inc. program beginning when the corporation was formed in 1979, and would serve as the Head Coach for the US Synchronized Swimming team at the 1984 Olympics.

Costie's training consisted of a regular swim workout with intervals and distance but included routine choreography and rehearsal, figures practice, weight training, running, and dance. In the four years of intensive training before the Games, she trained with Ruiz an average of 8–10 hours a day.

=== University of Arizona ===
Costie and Ruiz competed in synchronized swimming for the University of Arizona team. Costie and Ruiz won the duet event at the 1982 National Collegiate Championships and Costie received the honor of being named an All American. A powerful program, the Arizona team competed in the Association of Intercollegiate Athletics for Women (AIAW) Championships in 1981 and 1984. The Arizona team was coached by Kathy Kretschmer, who had formerly competed for the U.S. Junior and Senior National Teams and won a gold medal at the 1971 Pan American Games.

=== International competition ===
Costie claimed a silver medal in the women's duet at the 1982 World Aquatics Championships with Ruiz on August 1, 1982, in Guayaquil, Equador. She also won a silver medal with the American team at the 1982 World's in Guayaquil on August 5, 1982, finishing a close second to the Canadian team. In their ten-year partnership, Costie and Ruiz, only finished lower than first place twice, with one instance being at the 1982 World Aquatics Championships, as noted above, and at the 1980 U.S. National championships.

The pair also won a gold medal on August 19, 1983, in the women's duet at the 1983 Pan American Games in Caracas, Venezuela.

== 1984 Los Angeles Olympics ==
In a career highlight, Candy and her partner Tracy Ruiz won a gold medal at the women's duet event at the 1984 Summer Olympics in Los Angeles. Ruiz and Costie won a close competition against the Canadian duet team of Sharon Hambrook and Kelly Krycka, who placed second and took the silver medal. The 1984 team, the first to compete in synchronized swimming, was trained and directed by Head Coach Charlotte Davis, with Hall of Fame Coach Gail Emery as the team manager. The pair's gold medal and the American teams' success focused the American press on the sport and led the public to take greater interest in the new sport.

Costie and Ruiz's partnership extended to winning four US national championships. They won an NCAA national championship while competing for the University of Arizona.

=== Marriages ===
She met U.S. Water Polo Olympian Doug Burke at the 1982 World Games and the couple married after the Los Angeles Olympics on August 25, 1984, in Modesto, California. Burke was part of the 1980 Moscow U.S. Olympic Water Polo team which was not attended by the U.S., and later earned a silver medal in water polo in the 1984 Los Angeles Olympics. After her eight-year marriage to Doug Burke ended, Candy moved to Arizona around 1992 and married real estate developer Fred Merrill Jr. in February 1995. At the time, she had two children and two step children.

== Post-competition careers ==
After the Olympics, beginning in the mid-80's, Costie and Ruiz performed for several years in professional water shows as a synchronized duet, appearing at a number of venues and locations including Marineland, and in Las Vegas, and Hawaii. In 1984, Candy made a work-out video, marketed as a video cassette, known as "The Water Workout" which increased interest in the sport of synchronized swimming.

In the 1980s, Candy Merrill worked as a commentator for CBS and ESPN television networks for national and international sporting events. During the 1988 Olympics in Seoul, Korea, Merrill was an NBC analyst focusing on live coverage of the Synchronized Swimming events. Costie also worked for Fortune 500 Companies including American Express and Coca-Cola providing public speaking engagements during this period. As an athlete and celebrity, she did some product endorsements, and gained experience in marketing products.

Candy worked as an artist and painter in oil and ink at her Scottsdale, Arizona studio, the Desert Fish, which she started in the early 1990s.

Costie Merrill later joined Merrill Companies, based in Overland Park, Kansas, the family commercial real estate development firm, in 2000. As a principal, Merrill directed all marketing, public relations and social media efforts for the firm and was instrumental in the development of office, retail and community engagement projects, including Prairiefire and the Museum at Prairiefire. The Prairiefire Museum, a history museum with collected works from a variety of museums, opened in 2014, and had a beautiful architectural style which likely appealed to Costie-Merrill's strong interest in art.

In an effort to expand and nurture the culture of the education-focused community in the greater Kansas City metro area, Fred and Candy Merrill formed the Museum of Prairiefire Foundation in 2008 through a partnership with the American Museum of Natural History in New York.

In 2023 Fred and Candy Merrill, formed Kikabou: a music and nature-focused educational production company.

== Awards ==
Merrill received the first Gold Medal in her sport from the 1984 Summer Olympics for the women's duet in synchronized swimming. In 1985, she was a recipient of the Olympia Award, presented by the Southland Corporation to recognize exceptional achievement in the sports of the Summer and Winter Olympic games.

Costie was inducted into the International Swimming Hall of Fame in Fort Lauderdale, Florida in 1995.

== See also ==
- List of members of the International Swimming Hall of Fame
