= Doug Burke (water polo) =

American water polo player (born 1957)

Personal information
- Full name: Douglas Lambert Burke
- Born: March 30, 1957 (age 69) Modesto, California, U.S.
- Occupations: Baking Industry; Executive and Consultant
- Height: 183 cm (6 ft 0 in)
- Weight: 82 kg (181 lb)
- Spouses: Candy Costie (1984); Barbara Joanna Allen (1993)
- Children: Around 4

Sport
- Sport: Water Polo
- College team: Stanford University
- Club: Modesto Swim and Racquet Club (WP)
- Coached by: Art Lambert (Stanford); Monte Nitzkowski (Olympics)
Medal record
Men's water polo
Representing the United States
Olympic Games
Silver medal – second place	1984 Los Angeles	Men's water polo

Douglas Lambert Burke (born March 30, 1957) is a former water polo player who competed for Stanford University and won a silver medal for the United States at the 1984 Summer Olympics in Los Angeles, California. After graduating Stanford in Economics, he completed a Masters in Business Administration from the University of California at Los Angeles in 1986, and worked as a business founder, executive, and consultant in the Baking Industry beginning in the mid-1980's.

== Early life ==
Burke was born March 30, 1957, in Modesto, California, to Dr. and Mrs. Kenneth E. Burke, and attended Modesto's Fred C. Beyer High School. Playing for Beyer High's Head Coach Bob Casci, on November 4, 1972, Burke helped lead Beyer High to the Sacramento-San Joaquin Section Water Polo Championship in Stockton, California. In club competition during his High School years, he competed and trained with the club team Modesto Swim and Racquet Club from around 1965-1972.

== Stanford University ==
Burke attended Stanford University, where he majored in Economics and played water polo under Stanford Head Coach Art Lambert. While playing for Coach Lambert, Burke helped lead Stanford to NCAA national championships in water polo in both 1976, defeating UCLA, and in 1978 defeating the University of California. He was Captain of Stanford's team in 1978, and was a recipient of All American honors from the National Collegiate Athletic Association in 1976, 1977, and 1978. He earned Most Valuable Player honors from both the NCAA and the Pacific Conference-10 in 1978. In the off season, Burke competed with the Stanford area's Stanford Water Polo Club.

In 1986, he completed an MBA from the University of California, Los Angeles with a focus on finance and accounting, and forged a career as an entrepreneur beginning in the mid-80's.

== International competition ==
A member of the U.S. National team from 1976 to 1988, after graduating Stanford he moved to Los Angeles in the beginning of the 1980s to focus more intensely on his US Team training. In international competition, he received gold medals at the Pan American Games in 1979 in San Juan, Puerto, Rico, in 1983 in Caracas, Venezuela, and in 1987 in Indianapolis, Indiana. In 1979, he won a team gold medal at the Student University Games in Mexico, City, Mexico. He won a silver medal at the 1986 Goodwill Games Team, took a fifth place at the 1982 World Championships in Guayaquil, Ecuador, and played with the U.S. team that took fourth place at the 1986 World Championships in Madrid, Spain.

== Olympics ==
Burke qualified for the 1980 Moscow Olympics, but the U.S. did not compete due to their boycott of the event protesting Human rights violations in Russia.

== 1984 Los Angeles Olympic silver ==
Burke won a silver medal at the 1984 Summer Olympics in Los Angeles in the Men's Olympic water polo championship, where he was managed by Hall of Fame and Olympic Head Coach Monte Nitzkowski. The teams from Yugoslavia, Italy, the Soviet Union, Hungary and Spain were the pre-Olympic favorites to medal in water polo. Responding to the U.S. boycott of the 1980 Moscow Olympics, the teams from Hungary and Russia did not attend in 1984. The U.S. and Yugoslavia won their first three matches, and met in the final game to determine who would take the gold and silver medals. Going into the third quarter of play, the U.S. team held a late 5–2 advantage over Yugoslavia, but were unable to make another goal, and Yugoslavia tied the score 5–5 with three unanswered goals, winning due having scored more total goals in Olympic play. Yugoslavia took the gold, West Germany the Bronze and Spain placed fourth.

=== Honors ===
In 1994, he was inducted into the USA Water Polo Hall of Fame.

=== Marriages ===
On August 25, 1984, shortly after the Olympics, at age 27 he married Candy Costie, of Seattle, Washington at St. Paul's Episcopal Church in Modesto, California, though the marriage ended in divorce after around eight years. Costie, originally from Seattle, Washington, was a 1984 Olympic gold medalist in duet synchronized swimming. While living in Lake Oswego, Oregon, at age 36 Burke married Barbara Joanna Allen around June, 1993. The couple would raise around four children.

== Professions ==
In professional pursuits, around 1984 he and his wife Candy Costie formed Integrated Bakery Resources (IBR) in Lake Oswego, Oregon, a company that performed research on baking bread. Working over two decades in the business of baking, he started Innovative Cereal Systems (ICS) around 1985, a bread enzyme research company that performed research on enzymes, and serviced commercial bakeries. In 2005, Associated British Foods purchased his company Innovative Cereal Systems, and Cargil, a larger company with greater financial resources, and geographic scope, purchased his company Integrated Bakery Resources, which would eventually produce and market a range of baking related products including bread, bagel, and English Muffin mixes. He stayed as an executive with Cargill for around four years, then formed Whiteboard team, a consulting company. He was the owner of the Original Baking Company on West Avenue in Portland, Oregon.

== See also ==
- List of Olympic medalists in water polo (men)
