= Synchronised swimming at the 1982 World Aquatics Championships =

These are the results from the synchronised swimming competition at the 1982 World Aquatics Championships.

== Medal table ==
Rank	Nation	Gold	Silver	Bronze	Total
1	Canada (CAN)	2	1	0	3
2	United States (USA)	1	2	0	3
3	Japan (JPN)	0	0	3	3
Totals (3 entries)		3	3	3	9

== Medal summary ==
Event	Gold	Silver	Bronze
Solo routine	Tracie Ruiz (USA); 192.300	Kelly Kryczka (CAN); 188.983	Miwako Motoyoshi (JPN); 181.600
Duet routine	Sharon Hambrook (CAN); Kelly Kryczka (CAN); 190.541	Candy Costie (USA); Tracie Ruiz (USA); 188.650	Ikuko Abe (JPN); Masako Fujiwara (JPN); 181.900
Team routine	Canada (CAN); 188.258	United States (USA); 186.832	Japan (JPN); 182.050
