= Cliff Powell =

English footballer

Personal information
- Full name: Clifford George Powell
- Date of birth: 21 February 1968 (age 58)
- Place of birth: Watford, England
- Position: Defender

Senior career*
| Years | Team | Apps | (Gls) |
| 1986–1988 | Watford | 0 | (0) |
| 1987–1988 | → Hereford United (loan) | 7 | (0) |
| 1988–1990 | Sheffield United | 10 | (0) |
| 1989 | → Doncaster Rovers (loan) | 4 | (0) |
| 1989 | → Cardiff City (loan) | 1 | (0) |
- * Club domestic league appearances and goals

Clifford George Powell (born 21 February 1968) is an English former professional footballer who played as a defender. He began his career with his hometown club Watford. Unable to break into the first team, he made his professional debut during a loan spell with Hereford United in 1987. He joined Sheffield United in 1988 where he made ten league appearances and had brief loan spells with Doncaster Rovers and Cardiff City before dropping out of professional football.
