= Rowing at the 1960 Summer Olympics – Men's coxless pair =

Men's coxless pair at the Games of the XVII Olympiad
- Date: 31 August – 3 September 1960
- Competitors: 36 from 18 nations

Medalists
1st place, gold medalist(s)		Valentin Boreyko; Oleg Golovanov	Soviet Union
2nd place, silver medalist(s)		Josef Kloimstein; Alfred Sageder	Austria
3rd place, bronze medalist(s)		Veli Lehtelä; Toimi Pitkänen	Finland

The men's coxless pair competition at the 1960 Summer Olympics took place at took place at Lake Albano, Italy.

== Competition format ==
This rowing competition consisted of three main rounds (heats, semifinals, and final), as well as a repechage round that allowed teams that did not win their heats to advance to the semifinals. All races were 2,000 metres in distance.

- Heats: Four heats. With 19 boats entered, there were to be five boats per heat except the last heat, which was scheduled to have four boats but had only three start. The winner of each heat advanced directly to the semifinals, all other boats went to the repechage.
- Repechage: Four heats. With 14 boats racing in but not winning their initial heats, there were three or four boats per repechage heat. The top two boats in each repechage heat advanced to the semifinal, with the remaining boats eliminated.
- Semifinals: A total of 12 boats reached the semifinals (4 from the heats, 8 from the repechage). They were divided into two semifinals of six boats each. The top three boats in each semifinal advanced to the final, the fourth through sixth place boats were eliminated.
- Final: The final consisted of the remaining six boats.

== Results ==
=== Heats ===
==== Heat 1 ====
Rank	Rowers	Nation	Time	Notes
1	Jochen Neuling; Heinz Weigel	United Team of Germany	7:04.71	Q
2	Josef Kloimstein; Alfred Sageder	Austria	7:06.95	R
3	Arcadio Padilla; Roberto Retolaza	Mexico	7:25.63	R
4	Steven Blaisse; Ernst Veenemans	Netherlands	7:26.52	R
5	Keith Donald; Lorne Loomer	Canada	7:43.82	R

==== Heat 2 ====
Rank	Rowers	Nation	Time	Notes
1	Paolo Mosetti; Mario Petri	Italy	7:07.17	Q
2	Pablo Ferrero; Ricardo González	Argentina	7:17.70	R
3	Tage Grøndahl; Elo Tostenæs	Denmark	7:20.58	R
4	Ștefan Kurecska; Gheorghe Riffelt	Romania	7:35.77	R
5	Gösta Eriksson; Lennart Hansson	Sweden	7:38.08	R

==== Heat 3 ====
Rank	Rowers	Nation	Time	Notes
1	Veli Lehtelä; Toimi Pitkänen	Finland	7:05.00	Q
2	Ted Frost; Bob Rogers	United States	7:07.75	R
3	Nikola Čupin; Antun Ivanković	Yugoslavia	7:08.54	R
4	Terry Davies; John Hunt	Australia	7:51.88	R
5	Estuardo Masías; Víctor Puente	Peru	7:55.28	R

==== Heat 4 ====
Hungary was entered in this heat, but did not start.

Rank	Rowers	Nation	Time	Notes
1	Valentin Boreyko; Oleg Golovanov	Soviet Union	7:02.88	Q
2	Walter Knabenhans; Heinrich Scherer	Switzerland	7:14.52	R
3	Clive Marshall; Richard Nicholson	Great Britain	7:25.32	R

=== Repechage ===
==== Repechage heat 1 ====
Rank	Rowers	Nation	Time	Notes
1	Josef Kloimstein; Alfred Sageder	Austria	7:20.48	Q
2	Terry Davies; John Hunt	Australia	7:24.22	Q
3	Clive Marshall; Richard Nicholson	Great Britain	7:25.01	
–	Gösta Eriksson; Lennart Hansson	Sweden	DNS	

==== Repechage heat 2 ====
Rank	Rowers	Nation	Time	Notes
1	Arcadio Padilla; Roberto Retolaza	Mexico	7:21.46	Q
2	Pablo Ferrero; Ricardo González	Argentina	7:28.84	Q
3	Estuardo Masías; Víctor Puente	Peru	7:45.15	

==== Repechage heat 3 ====
Rank	Rowers	Nation	Time	Notes
1	Ted Frost; Bob Rogers	United States	7:14.16	Q
2	Tage Grøndahl; Elo Tostenæs	Denmark	7:17.06	Q
3	Steven Blaisse; Ernst Veenemans	Netherlands	7:21.70	

==== Repechage heat 4 ====
Rank	Rowers	Nation	Time	Notes
1	Nikola Čupin; Antun Ivanković	Yugoslavia	7:14.20	Q
2	Walter Knabenhans; Heinrich Scherer	Switzerland	7:22.29	Q
3	Keith Donald; Lorne Loomer	Canada	7:42.51	
4	Ștefan Kurecska; Gheorghe Riffelt	Romania	7:59.67	

=== Semifinals ===
==== Semifinal 1 ====
Rank	Rowers	Nation	Time	Notes
1	Jochen Neuling; Heinz Weigel	United Team of Germany	7:30.03	Q
2	Veli Lehtelä; Toimi Pitkänen	Finland	7:35.50	Q
3	Nikola Čupin; Antun Ivanković	Yugoslavia	7:38.83	Q
4	Arcadio Padilla; Roberto Retolaza	Mexico	7:45.55	
5	Terry Davies; John Hunt	Australia	7:50.59	
–	Tage Grøndahl; Elo Tostenæs	Denmark	DNF	

==== Semifinal 2 ====
Rank	Rowers	Nation	Time	Notes
1	Josef Kloimstein; Alfred Sageder	Austria	7:30.10	Q
2	Valentin Boreyko; Oleg Golovanov	Soviet Union	7:31.00	Q
3	Ted Frost; Bob Rogers	United States	7:31.11	Q
4	Paolo Mosetti; Mario Petri	Italy	7:40.09	
5	Walter Knabenhans; Heinrich Scherer	Switzerland	7:42.24	
6	Pablo Ferrero; Ricardo González	Argentina	7:48.48	

=== Final ===
Rank	Rowers	Nation	Time
1st place, gold medalist(s)	Valentin Boreyko; Oleg Golovanov	Soviet Union	7:02.01
2nd place, silver medalist(s)	Josef Kloimstein; Alfred Sageder	Austria	7:03.69
3rd place, bronze medalist(s)	Veli Lehtelä; Toimi Pitkänen	Finland	7:03.80
4	Jochen Neuling; Heinz Weigel	United Team of Germany	7:08.81
5	Ted Frost; Bob Rogers	United States	7:17.08
6	Nikola Čupin; Antun Ivanković	Yugoslavia	7:20.91
