= Brazil at the 1956 Summer Olympics =

- IOC code: BRA
- NOC: Brazilian Olympic Committee

in Melbourne/Stockholm
- Competitors: 47 (46 men and 1 woman) in 11 sports
- Flag bearer: Adhemar Ferreira da Silva
- Medals Ranked 24th: Gold 1 Silver 0 Bronze 0 Total 1

Summer Olympics appearances (overview)
- 1920; 1924; 1928; 1932; 1936; 1948; 1952; 1956; 1960; 1964; 1968; 1972; 1976; 1980; 1984; 1988; 1992; 1996; 2000; 2004; 2008; 2012; 2016; 2020; 2024; 2028

Brazil competed at the 1956 Summer Olympics in Melbourne, Australia and Stockholm, Sweden (equestrian events). 44 competitors, 43 men and one woman took part in 28 events in 11 sports. The only Brazilian medal was the gold won by Adhemar Ferreira da Silva in men's triple jump. This was his second gold medal in the event. He was the first Brazilian to be a two-time Olympic champion.

== Medalists ==
Medal	Name	Sport	Event	Date
Gold	Adhemar Ferreira da Silva	Athletics	Men's triple jump	November 27

Medals by sport
Sport	1st place, gold medalist(s)	2nd place, silver medalist(s)	3rd place, bronze medalist(s)	Total
Athletics	1	0	0	1
Total	1	0	0	1

Medals by gender
Gender	1st place, gold medalist(s)	2nd place, silver medalist(s)	3rd place, bronze medalist(s)	Total
Male	1	0	0	1
Female	0	0	0	0
Mixed	0	0	0	0
Total	1	0	0	1

== Athletics ==
Men
Track & road events

Athlete	Event	Heat		Quarterfinal		Semifinal		Final	
Athlete	Event	Result	Rank	Result	Rank	Result	Rank	Result	Rank
Jorge de Barros	100 m	11.15	4	did not advance					
Jorge de Barros	200 m	22.30	2 Q	23.88	5	did not advance			
José da Conceição	200 m	21.61	1 Q	21.46	3 Q	21.53	3 Q	21.56	6
Ulisses dos Santos	400 m hurdles	53.8	4	did not advance					
João Pires Sobrinho	100 m	11.14	3	did not advance					
João Pires Sobrinho	200 m	21.67	3	did not advance					
Ary de Sá; Jorge Machado; João Pires Sobrinho; José da Conceição	4 × 100 m relay	41.6	3 Q	—N/a		43.8	6	did not advance	

Field events

Athlete	Event	Qualification		Final	
Athlete	Event	Distance	Position	Distance	Position
José da Conceição	High jump	1.86	21	did not advance	
Ary de Sá	Long jump	7.00	20	did not advance	
Adhemar da Silva	Triple jump	15.15	11 Q	16.35 OR	1st place, gold medalist(s)

== Basketball ==
=== Preliminary round ===
==== Group D ====
TEAM	PTS	P	W	L	PF	PA
Brazil	4	2	2	0	167	125
Chile	3	2	1	1	137	134
Australia	2	2	0	2	122	167

Chile	59–78	Brazil
Scoring by half: 34–39, 25–39

Brazil	89–66	Australia
Scoring by half: 50–35, 39–31

=== Quarterfinal ===
==== Group B ====
TEAM	PTS	P	W	L	PF	PA
United States	6	3	3	0	283	150
Soviet Union	5	3	2	1	208	209
Bulgaria	4	3	1	2	182	224
Brazil	3	3	0	3	192	282

Brazil	68–87	Soviet Union
Scoring by half: 28–37, 40–50

United States	113–51	Brazil
Scoring by half: 50–22, 63–29

Bulgaria	82–73	Brazil
Scoring by half: 38–36, 44–37

=== Classification 5–8 ===
Chile	64–89	Brazil

Bulgaria	64–52	Brazil

== Boxing ==
Men

Athlete	Event	1 Round	2 Round	Quarterfinals	Semifinals	Final	
Athlete	Event	Opposition Result	Opposition Result	Opposition Result	Opposition Result	Opposition Result	Rank
Eder Jofre	Bantamweight	BYE	Thein Myint (BIR); L PTS	Claudio Barrientos (CHI); L PTS	did not advance		5
Celestino Pinto	Light-Welterweight	Leopold Potesil (AUT); L PTS	did not advance				

== Cycling ==
=== Track ===
1000m time trial

Athlete	Event	Time	Rank
Anísio Argenton	Time trial	1:12.7	9

Men's Sprint

Athlete	Event	Heats	Repechage 1	Repechage Finals	Quarterfinals	Semifinals	Final	
Athlete	Event	Time Speed (km/h)	Rank	Opposition Time Speed (km/h)	Opposition Time Speed (km/h)	Opposition Time Speed (km/h)	Opposition Time Speed (km/h)	Rank
Anísio Argenton	Sprint	Romanov (URS); Shardelow (RSA); L	Mitchell (TTO); Markus (CAN); W 13.0	Shardelow (RSA); L inches behind	did not advance			9

== Diving ==
Men

Athlete	Event	Preliminary		Final			
Athlete	Event	Points	Rank	Points	Rank	Total	Rank
Fernando Ribeiro	3 m springboard	62.07	23	did not advance			

Women

Athlete	Event	Preliminary		Final			
Athlete	Event	Points	Rank	Points	Rank	Total	Rank
Mary Proença	10 m platform	36.71	16	did not advance			

== Equestrian ==
=== Show jumping ===
Athlete	Horse	Event	Round 1		Round 2		Final		
Athlete	Horse	Event	Penalties	Rank	Penalties	Rank	Total	Jump-off	Rank
Renyldo Ferreira	Bibelot	Individual	29.25	34	56.25	44	85.50	—N/a	42
Eloy de Menezes	Biguaj	Individual	56.25	47	28.75	31	85.00	—N/a	41
Nelson Pessoa	Relincho	Individual	32.00	35T	26.00	28	58.00	—N/a	33
Renyldo Ferreira; Eloy de Menezes; Nelson Pessoa	See above	Team	117.50	11	111.00	10	58.00	—N/a	10

== Modern pentathlon ==
Three male pentathletes represented Brazil in 1956.

Men

Athlete	Event	Riding (show jumping)	Fencing (épée one touch)	Shooting (25 m rapid-fire pistol)	Swimming (300 m freestyle)	Running (4000 m)	Total points	Final rank
Athlete	Event	Points	Points	Points	Points	Points	Total points	Final rank
Sálvio Lemos	Men's	455	556	760	785	730	3,286	27
Wenceslau Malta	Men's	0	741	760	755	877	3,133	31
Nilo da Silva	Men's	17.5	DNS	DNF				AC
Sálvio Lemos; Wenceslau Malta; Nilo da Silva	Team	472.5	AC	DNF				AC

== Rowing ==
Brazil had five male rowers participate in one out of seven rowing events in 1956.

Men

Athlete	Event	Heats		Repechage		Semifinals		Final	
Athlete	Event	Time	Rank	Time	Rank	Time	Rank	Time	Rank
Ruy Kopper; André Richer; Nelson Guarda; José de Carvalho Filho; Sylvio de Souza	Coxed four	7:13.9	3 R	7:25.7	2	did not advance			

== Sailing ==
Open

Athlete	Event	Race														Final rank	
Athlete	Event	1		2		3		4		5		6		7		Final rank	
Athlete	Event	Score	Rank	Score	Rank	Score	Rank	Score	Rank	Score	Rank	Score	Rank	Score	Rank	Score	Rank
Joaquim Roderbourg	Finn	16	198	11	361	~~DNF~~	~~0~~	14	256	9	448	DNF	0	14	256	1519	17
Alfredo Jorge Ebling Bercht; Rolf Ebling Bercht	12m² Sharpie	~~DNF~~	~~0~~	11	174	7	370	DNF 0	0	11	174	7	370	9	261	1349	10

== Shooting ==
Four shooters represented Brazil in 1956.

Men

Athlete	Event	Final	
Athlete	Event	Score	Rank
Severino Moreira	50 m rifle, three positions	1102	37
Severino Moreira	50 m rifle, prone	597	8
Pedro Simão	25 m rapid fire pistol	561	16
Milton Sobocinski	50 m rifle, three positions	1115	33
Milton Sobocinski	50 m rifle, prone	594	20
Adhaury Rocha	25 m rapid fire pistol	556	18

== Swimming ==
Men

Athlete	Event	Heat		Semifinal		Final	
Athlete	Event	Time	Rank	Time	Rank	Time	Rank
João Gonçalves Filho	100 metre backstroke	1:07.9	5	did not advance			
Haroldo Lara	100 metre freestyle	59.9	4	did not advance			
Octavio Mobiglia	200 metre breaststroke	DSQ		did not advance			
Sylvio dos Santos	400 metre freestyle	4:48.8	5	did not advance			

== Weightlifting ==
Men

Athlete	Event	Military Press		Snatch		Clean & Jerk		Total	Rank
Athlete	Event	Result	Rank	Result	Rank	Result	Rank	Total	Rank
Américo Ferreira	67.5 kg	102.5	15	97.5	17	135.0	10	335.0	14
Bruno Barabani	90 kg	110.0	15	112.5	10	145.0	11	367.5	12
