= Cuba at the 1956 Summer Olympics =

- IOC code: CUB
- NOC: Cuban Olympic Committee

in Melbourne/Stockholm
- Competitors: 16 (15 men and 1 woman) in 5 sports
- Flag bearer: Manuel Sanguily
- Medals: Gold 0 Silver 0 Bronze 0 Total 0

Summer Olympics appearances (overview)
- 1900; 1904; 1908–1920; 1924; 1928; 1932–1936; 1948; 1952; 1956; 1960; 1964; 1968; 1972; 1976; 1980; 1984–1988; 1992; 1996; 2000; 2004; 2008; 2012; 2016; 2020; 2024

Cuba competed at the 1956 Summer Olympics in Melbourne, Australia. It was the nation's seventh appearance at the Olympics, after debuting in 1900 and missing a few Summer Olympic events afterward. As a partial support to the Dutch-led boycott, Cuban athletes under the Olympic flag instead of the national flag.

== Athletics ==
Men's 110m hurdles

- Evaristo Iglesias
  - Heat — 14.3s
  - Semifinals — 14.6s (→ did not advance)

== Rowing ==
Cuba had nine male rowers participate in two out of seven rowing events in 1956.

Men's coxless four

- Luis Olivera
- Orlando Lanza
- Enrique Hernández
- Joaquín Pérez

Men's coxed four

- José Roa
- Enrique Torres
- José Romero Santos
- José Hurdado
- Virgilio Ara (cox)

== Swimming ==
Men

Athlete	Event	Heat		Final	
Athlete	Event	Time	Rank	Time	Rank
Raúl Martín	400 m freestyle	4:58.2	31	Did not advance	
Raúl Martín	1500 m freestyle	19:59.9	20	Did not advance	
Manuel Sanguily	200 m breaststroke	2:41.8	7 Q	2:42.0	7
