= Finland at the 1956 Summer Olympics =

- IOC code: FIN
- NOC: Finnish Olympic Committee

in Melbourne/Stockholm
- Competitors: 64 (63 men and 1 woman) in 14 sports
- Flag bearers: Eeles Landström (Melbourne); Erkki Estola (Stockholm)
- Medals Ranked 13th: Gold 3 Silver 1 Bronze 11 Total 15

Summer Olympics appearances (overview)
- 1908; 1912; 1920; 1924; 1928; 1932; 1936; 1948; 1952; 1956; 1960; 1964; 1968; 1972; 1976; 1980; 1984; 1988; 1992; 1996; 2000; 2004; 2008; 2012; 2016; 2020; 2024

Other related appearances
- 1906 Intercalated Games

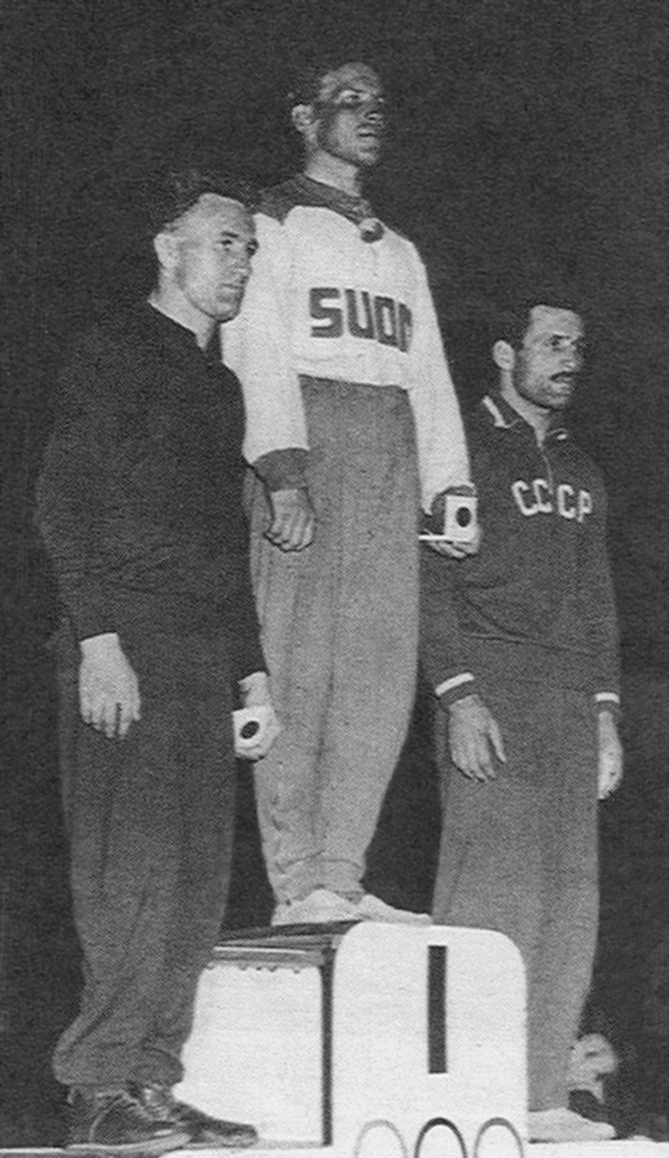

Finland, the previous host of the 1952 Summer Olympics in Helsinki, competed at the 1956 Summer Olympics in Melbourne, Australia and Stockholm, Sweden (equestrian events). 64 competitors, 63 men and 1 woman, took part in 62 events in 14 sports.

== Medalists ==
=== Gold ===
- Pentti Linnosvuo — Shooting, Men's Free Pistol
- Rauno Mäkinen — Wrestling, Men's Greco-Roman Featherweight
- Kyösti Lehtonen — Wrestling, Men's Greco-Roman Lightweight

=== Silver ===
- Olavi Mannonen — Modern Pentathlon, Men's Individual Competition

=== Bronze ===
- Voitto Hellsten — Athletics, Men's 400 metres
- Veikko Karvonen — Athletics, Men's Marathon
- Jorma Valkama — Athletics, Men's Long Jump
- Pentti Hämäläinen — Boxing, Men's Featherweight
- Raimo Heinonen, Onni Lappalainen, Olavi Leimuvirta, Berndt Lindfors, Martti Mansikka, and Kalevi Suoniemi — Gymnastics, Men's Team Combined Exercises
- Wäinö Korhonen — Modern Pentathlon, Men's Individual Competition
- Berndt Katter, Wäinö Korhonen, and Olavi Mannonen — Modern Pentathlon, Men's Team Competition
- Kauko Hänninen, Veli Lehtelä, Matti Niemi, Toimi Pitkänen, and Reino Poutanen — Rowing, Men's Coxed Fours
- Vilho Ylönen — Shooting, Men's Free Rifle, Three Positions
- Erkki Penttilä — Wrestling, Men's Freestyle Featherweight
- Taisto Kangasniemi — Wrestling, Men's Freestyle Heavyweight

== Athletics ==
Men's Marathon

- Veikko Karvonen — 2:27:47 (→ Bronze Medal)
- Eino Oksanen — 2:36:10 (→ 10th place)
- Paavo Kotila — 2:37:10 (→ 13th place)

== Cycling ==
Sprint

- Paul Nyman — 18th place

Time trial

- Paul Nyman — 1:16.1 (→ 18th place)

Individual road race

- Paul Nyman — 5:23:40 (→ 11th place)

== Diving ==
Men

Athlete	Event	Preliminary		Final			
Athlete	Event	Points	Rank	Points	Rank	Total	Rank
Helge Vasenius	3 m springboard	73.82	15	Did not advance			
Helge Vasenius	10 m platform	66.63	16	Did not advance			

== Fencing ==
Two fencers, both men, represented Finland in 1956.

Men's épée

- Rolf Wiik
- Wäinö Korhonen

== Modern pentathlon ==
Three male pentathletes represented Finland in 1956. Wäinö Korhonen won the bronze and Ole Mannonen won the silver in the individual event. In the team event, the Finnish pentathletes won bronze.

Individual

- Ole Mannonen
- Wäinö Korhonen
- Berndt Katter

Team

- Ole Mannonen
- Wäinö Korhonen
- Berndt Katter

== Rowing ==
Finland had five male rowers participate in two out of seven rowing events in 1956.

Men's coxless four

- Kauko Hänninen
- Reino Poutanen
- Veli Lehtelä
- Toimi Pitkänen

Men's coxed four

- Kauko Hänninen
- Reino Poutanen
- Veli Lehtelä
- Toimi Pitkänen
- Matti Niemi (cox)

== Shooting ==
Four shooters represented Finland in 1956. Pentti Linnosvuo won gold in the 50 m pistol and Vilho Ylönen won bronze in the 300 m rifle, three positions.

25 m pistol

- Pentti Linnosvuo
- Kalle Sievänen

50 m pistol

- Pentti Linnosvuo
- Kalle Sievänen

300 m rifle, three positions

- Vilho Ylönen
- Jorma Taitto

50 m rifle, three positions

- Vilho Ylönen
- Jorma Taitto

50 m rifle, prone

- Vilho Ylönen
- Jorma Taitto

== Swimming ==
Men

Athlete	Event	Heat		Semifinal		Final	
Athlete	Event	Time	Rank	Time	Rank	Time	Rank
Karri Käyhkö	100 m freestyle	59.8	22	Did not advance			
Karri Käyhkö	400 m freestyle	4:49.6	26	—N/a		Did not advance	

== Wrestling ==
- Viljo Punkari
