= Rowing at the 1964 Summer Olympics – Men's coxless pair =

Men's coxless pair at the Games of the XVIII Olympiad
- Venue: Toda Rowing Course
- Date: 11–15 October 1964
- Competitors: 28 from 14 nations
- Teams: 14
- Winning time: 7:32.94

Medalists
1st place, gold medalist(s)		George Hungerford; Roger Jackson	Canada
2nd place, silver medalist(s)		Steven Blaisse; Ernst Veenemans	Netherlands
3rd place, bronze medalist(s)		Michael Schwan; Wolfgang Hottenrott	United Team of Germany

The coxless pair event was a rowing event conducted as part of the Rowing at the 1964 Summer Olympics programme.

== Medalists ==
Gold	Silver	Bronze
George Hungerford; Roger Jackson (CAN)	Steven Blaisse; Ernst Veenemans (NED)	Michael Schwan; Wolfgang Hottenrott (EUA)

== Results ==
=== Heats ===
The top crew in each heat advanced to the final, with all others (except the Bulgarian crew, which did not start in the heats) sent to the repechages.

Heat 1
1.	Steven Blaisse and Ernst Veenemans (NED)	7:21.03	QF
2.	Peter Bolliger and Nicolas Gobet (SUI)	7:26.18	QR
3.	Roger Ninham and Bob Shirlaw (AUS)	7:32.75	QR
4.	James Edmonds and Tony Johnson (USA)	7:33.89	QR
5.	Takao Kogo and Norimasa Kurosaki (JPN)	7:48.15	QR
Heat 2
1.	George Hungerford and Roger Jackson (CAN)	7:19.78	QF
2.	Peter Fich and Hans Boye (DEN)	7:22.01	QR
3.	Carlos Montaldo and Ricardo Durán (ARG)	7:30.76	QR
4.	Oleg Golovanov and Valentin Boreiko (URS)	7:37.35	QR
5.	Toimi Pitkänen and Veli Lehtelä (FIN)	Hors course	QR
Heat 3
1.	Michael Schwan and Wolfgang Hottenrott (EUA)	7:20.18	QF
2.	David Lee Nicholson and Stewart Farquharson (GBR)	7:30.34	QR
3.	Mariano Caulin and Gustavo Perez (URU)	7:43.79	QR
4.	Czesław Nawrot and Alfons Ślusarski (POL)	7:47.02	QR
—	Georgi Nicolov and Atanass Mandadjiev (BUL)	Did not start

==== Repechages ====
The top finisher in each of the three repechages joined the finalists. The second and third place finishers competed in a consolation final for 7th-12th places. The fourth place finisher, in the repechages with that many competitors, was eliminated.

Repechage 1
1.	Toimi Pitkänen and Veli Lehtelä (FIN)	7:29.03	QF
2.	Peter Bolliger and Nicolas Golet (SUI)	7:34.23	QC
3.	Mariano Caulin and Gustavo Perez (URU)	7:39.43	QC
4.	Oleg Golovanov and Valentin Boreiko (URS)	7:42.54
Repechage 2
1.	Peter Fich and Hans Boye (DEN)	7:31.11	QF
2.	Czeslaw Nawrot and Alfons Ślusarski (POL)	7:35.82	QC
3.	Roger Ninham and Bob Shirlaw (AUS)	7:39.18	QC
Repechage 3
1.	James Lee and Stewart Farquharson (GBR)	7:28.30	QF
2.	James Edmonds and Tony Johnson (USA)	7:30.84	QC
3.	Carlos Montaldo and Ricardo Duran (ARG)	7:42.23	QC
4.	Kogo Takao and Kurosaki Norimasa (JPN)	7:54.43

=== Consolation final ===
The consolation final determined places from 7th to 12th.

7.	Peter Bolliger and Nicolas Golet (SUI)	7:05.71
8.	Czeslaw Nawrot and Alfons Ślusarski (POL)	7:08.38
9.	Roger Ninham and Bob Shirlaw (AUS)	7:12.18
10.	James Edmonds and Tony Johnson (USA)	7:15.04
11.	Carlos Montaldo and Ricardo Duran (ARG)	Did not start
11.	Mariano Caulin and Gustavo Perez (URU)	Did not start

=== Final ===
	George Hungerford and Roger Jackson (CAN)	7:32.94
	Steven Blaisse and Ernst Veenemans (NED)	7:33.40
	Michael Schwan and Wolfgang Hottenrott (EUA)	7:38.63
4.	James Lee and Stewart Farquharson (GBR)	7:42.00
5.	Peter Fich and Hans Boye (DEN)	7:48.13
6.	Toimi Pitkänen and Veli Lehtelä (FIN)	8:05.74

== Sources ==
- Tokyo Organizing Committee (1964). The Games of the XVIII Olympiad: Tokyo 1964, vol. 2.
