= Rowing at the 1956 Summer Olympics – Men's coxed four =

Men's coxed four at the Games of the XVI Olympiad
- Rowing pictogram
- Venue: Lake Wendouree
- Dates: 23–27 November 1956
- Competitors: 50 from 10 nations
- Winning time: 7:19.4

Medalists
1st place, gold medalist(s)		Italy: Alberto Winkler; Romano Sgheiz; Angelo Vanzin; Franco Trincavelli; Ivo Stefanoni (cox)	Italy
2nd place, silver medalist(s)		Sweden: Olle Larsson; Gösta Eriksson; Ivar Aronsson; Evert Gunnarsson; Bertil Göransson (cox)	
3rd place, bronze medalist(s)		Finland: Kauko Hänninen; Reino Poutanen; Veli Lehtelä; Toimi Pitkänen; Matti Niemi (cox)	

The men's coxed four competition at the 1956 Summer Olympics took place at Lake Wendouree, Ballarat, Australia. It was held from 23 to 27 November and was won by the team from Italy. There were 10 boats (50 competitors) from 10 nations, with each nation limited to a single boat in the event. Italy had previously won this event in 1928, tying Switzerland for second-most wins among nations. Sweden (silver) and Finland (bronze) each won their first medal in the men's coxed four. Switzerland had its three-Games silver-medal streak broken, without a Swiss crew competing.

== Background ==
This was the 10th appearance of the event. Rowing had been on the programme in 1896 but was cancelled due to bad weather. The coxed four was one of the four initial events introduced in 1900. It was not held in 1904 or 1908, but was held at every Games from 1912 to 1992 when it (along with the men's coxed pair) was replaced with the men's lightweight double sculls and men's lightweight coxless four.

There was no clear favourite for the event. No nation had won the European Rowing Championships since the previous Olympic Games more than once. Only the Soviet Union had won a European Rowing Championship medal twice since 1952. Italy had come third at the 1956 European Rowing Championships.

No nations made their debut in the event. The United States made its eighth appearance, most among nations to that point. Notable absences included France (previously tied with the United States for most appearances at seven) and Switzerland (which had won gold or silver in each of their six appearances).

== Competition format ==
The coxed four event featured five-person boats, with four rowers and a coxswain. It was a sweep rowing event, with the rowers each having one oar (and thus each rowing on one side). The competition used the 2000 metres distance that became standard at the 1912 Olympics and which has been used ever since except at the 1948 Games.

The competition venue had five lanes, but the organising committee had restricted races to four teams. This allowed for changing wind conditions, where the most affected lane could be left unused. Ten teams from ten nations attended the competition. On all days, the coxed four were the first races held of the day.

The competition featured four rounds (three main rounds and a repechage).

- Quarterfinals: 3 heats, 3 or 4 boats each, top 2 in each heat (6 total) advanced to the semifinals while others (4 boats) went to the repechage.
- Repechage: 2 heats, 2 boats each, top 1 in each heat (2 total) advanced to the semifinals while all others (2 boats) were eliminated.
- Semifinals: 2 heats, 4 boats each, top 2 in each heat (4 total) advanced to the final while all others (4 boats) were eliminated.
- Final: 1 heat, 4 boats, determining medals and 4th place.

== Schedule ==
All times are Australian Eastern Standard Time (UTC+10)

Date	Time	Round
Friday, 23 November 1956	9:30	Quarterfinals
Saturday, 24 November 1956	9:30	Repechage
Monday, 26 November 1956	10:00	Semifinals
Tuesday, 27 November 1956	14:30	Final

== Results ==
=== Quarterfinals ===
Three heats were rowed on 23 November. Two of the heats had three teams and one had four teams, with the first two teams to qualify for the semi-final, and the remaining teams progressing to the round one repechage.

==== Quarterfinal 1 ====
Rank	Rowers	Coxswain	Nation	Time	Notes
1	Alberto Winkler; Romano Sgheiz; Angelo Vanzin; Franco Trincavelli	Ivo Stefanoni	Italy	7:00.0	Q
2	Andrey Arkhipov; Yury Popov; Valentin Zanin; Yaroslav Cherstvy	Anatoly Fetisov	Soviet Union	7:07.5	Q
3	Peter Lucas; Ray Laurent; Donald Gemmell; Allan Tong	Colin Johnstone	New Zealand	7:16.2	R

==== Quarterfinal 2 ====
Rank	Rowers	Coxswain	Nation	Time	Notes
1	Olle Larsson; Gösta Eriksson; Ivar Aronsson; Evert Gunnarsson	Bertil Göransson	Sweden	6:57.9	Q
2	Elo Tostenæs; Mogens Sørensen; Børge Hansen; Tage Grøndahl	John Vilhelmsen	Denmark	7:05.3	Q
3	Kauko Hänninen; Reino Poutanen; Veli Lehtelä; Toimi Pitkänen	Matti Niemi	Finland	7:16.2	R

==== Quarterfinal 3 ====
Rank	Rowers	Coxswain	Nation	Time	Notes
1	James Wynne; Douglas Turner; James McMullen; Ronald Cardwell	Edward Masterson	United States	7:01.8	Q
2	Gordon Cowey; Kevin McMahon; Reg Libbis; Ian Allen	John Jenkinson	Australia	7:01.9	Q
3	André Richer; Ruy Kopper; Nelson Guarda; José de Carvalho Filho	Sylvio de Souza	Brazil	7:13.9	R
4	José Roa; Enrique Torres; José Romero Santos; José Hurdado	Virgilio Ara	Cuba	7:14.3	R

=== Repechage ===
Four boats competed in the one repechage on 24 November in two heats, with the winner qualifying for the semi-final.

==== Repechage heat 1 ====
Rank	Rowers	Coxswain	Nation	Time	Notes
1	Peter Lucas; Ray Laurent; Donald Gemmell; Allan Tong	Colin Johnstone	New Zealand	7:16.6	Q
2	José Roa; Enrique Torres; José Romero Santos; José Hurdado	Virgilio Ara	Cuba	7:28.2	

==== Repechage heat 2 ====
Rank	Rowers	Coxswain	Nation	Time	Notes
1	Kauko Hänninen; Reino Poutanen; Veli Lehtelä; Toimi Pitkänen	Matti Niemi	Finland	7:09.8	Q
2	André Richer; Ruy Kopper; Nelson Guarda; José de Carvalho Filho	Sylvio de Souza	Brazil	7:25.7	

=== Semifinals ===
Two heats were rowed in the semi-finals on 26 November, with the top two teams qualifying for the final.

==== Semifinal 1 ====
Rank	Rowers	Coxswain	Nation	Time	Notes
1	Alberto Winkler; Romano Sgheiz; Angelo Vanzin; Franco Trincavelli	Ivo Stefanoni	Italy	7:54.4	Q
2	Gordon Cowey; Kevin McMahon; Reg Libbis; Ian Allen	John Jenkinson	Australia	7:59.8	Q
3	Elo Tostenæs; Mogens Sørensen; Børge Hansen; Tage Grøndahl	John Vilhelmsen	Denmark	8:08.4	
4	Peter Lucas; Ray Laurent; Donald Gemmell; Allan Tong	Colin Johnstone	New Zealand	8:30.7	

==== Semifinal 2 ====
Rank	Rowers	Coxswain	Nation	Time	Notes
1	Olle Larsson; Gösta Eriksson; Ivar Aronsson; Evert Gunnarsson	Bertil Göransson	Sweden	8:01.8	Q
2	Kauko Hänninen; Reino Poutanen; Veli Lehtelä; Toimi Pitkänen	Matti Niemi	Finland	8:08.1	Q
3	Andrey Arkhipov; Yury Popov; Valentin Zanin; Yaroslav Cherstvy	Anatoly Fetisov	Soviet Union	8:14.0	
4	James Wynne; Douglas Turner; James McMullen; Ronald Cardwell	Edward Masterson	United States	8:24.3	

=== Final ===
Four teams reached the final, which was decided in one race held on 27 November. The team from Italy, which had won its heat and semi-final, won the final in an unremarkable race leading from start to finish.

Rank	Rowers	Coxswain	Nation	Time
1st place, gold medalist(s)	Alberto Winkler; Romano Sgheiz; Angelo Vanzin; Franco Trincavelli	Ivo Stefanoni	Italy	7:19.4
2nd place, silver medalist(s)	Olle Larsson; Gösta Eriksson; Ivar Aronsson; Evert Gunnarsson	Bertil Göransson	Sweden	7:22.4
3rd place, bronze medalist(s)	Kauko Hänninen; Reino Poutanen; Veli Lehtelä; Toimi Pitkänen	Matti Niemi	Finland	7:30.9
4	Gordon Cowey; Kevin McMahon; Reg Libbis; Ian Allen	John Jenkinson	Australia	7:31.1
