= Ronaldo Carvalho =

Ronaldo Carvalho may also refer to:

- Ronaldo de Carvalho (born 1959), Brazilian Olympic rower
- Ronaldo Carvalho (tennis) (born 1979), Brazilian tennis player
