= Albert Winkler =

Albert Winkler may refer to:

- Alberto Winkler (1932–1981), Italian rower
- Albert J. Winkler (1894–1989), American professor of viticulture
- Albert Winkler (entomologist) (1881–1945), Austrian entomologist
