= Yuri Popov =

Yuri or Yury Popov may refer to:

- Yuri Alekseevich Popov, Chairman of the State Council of Chuvashia
- Yuri Alexandrovich Popov (1936–2016), Soviet and Russian paleoentomologist
- Yuri Lazarevich Popov (1929–2013) Soviet and Russian opera singer
- Yuri Mikhailovich Popov (born 1929) Soviet and Russian physicist
- Yury Popov, Soviet rower
