= Edward Masterson =

Edward Masterson may refer to:

- Ed Masterson (1852–1878), lawman and brother of the American West gunfighters Bat Masterson and James Masterson
- Edward Masterson (rowing) (born 1937), American coxswain
