= Kurosaki =

Kurosaki may refer to:

== People with the surname ==
- Hisashi Kurosaki (黒崎 久志, born 1968), Japanese former football player and manager
- Maon Kurosaki (黒崎 真音, 1988–2023), Japanese singer and songwriter
- Narumi Kurosaki (黒崎 愛海, 1995–2016), Japanese woman murdered in France
- Norimasa Kurosaki (黒崎 紀正, born 1943), Japanese rower
- Reina Kurosaki (黒崎 レイナ, born 1998), Japanese actress, tarento, and fashion model
- Ryan Kurosaki (born 1952), American former baseball player

=== Fictional characters ===
- Ichigo Kurosaki, a character in Bleach
- Isshin Kurosaki, a character in Bleach
- Masaki Kurosaki, a character in Bleach
- Karin Kurosaki, a character in Bleach
- Yuzu Kurosaki, a character in Bleach
- Mea Kurosaki, a character in To Love-Ru Darkness
- Tasuku Kurosaki, a character from the Dengeki Daisy manga series
- Miu Kurosaki, a character in The King of Fighters universe
- Miki Kurosaki, a character in the Digimon Data Squad
- Sayoko Kurosaki and daughter Asami Kurosaki, characters in Mahoraba
- Hisoka Kurosaki, a character in Descendants of Darkness
- Shun Kurosaki and sister Ruri Kurosaki in Yu-Gi-Oh! Arc-V
- Haruto Kurosaki, a character in Defying Kurosaki-kun
- Sakura Kurosaki, a character in Defying Kurosaki-kun

== Places ==
- Kurosaki, Niigata, a former town from Nishikanbara District in Niigata, Japan

== See also ==
- Kurosaki Station, a railway station in Japan
