= Hans Boye =

Hans Boye may refer to:

- Hans Boye (1745–1815), Danish customs inspector and Justitieråd
- Martin Hans Boyè (1812–1907), Danish-American chemist
- Hans Jørgen Boye (born 1942), Danish Olympic rower
