= Norimasa =

- Gender: Male

Origin
- Origin: Japanese
- Meaning: Different meanings depending on the kanji used

Norimasa (written: 憲政, 教正, 則賢, 規真 or 紀正) is a masculine Japanese given name. Notable people with the name include:

- Norimasa Kaeriyama (帰山 教正) (1893–1964), Japanese film director and theorist
- Uesugi Norimasa (上杉 憲政) (1523–1579), Japanese daimyō
- Norimasa Fujisawa (藤澤 ノリマサ) (1983-), Japanese singer and composer
- Norimasa Iwai (岩井 則賢) (1973-), Japanese gymnast
- Norimasa Nakanishi (中西 規真) (1991), Japanese footballer
- Norimasa Kurosaki (黒崎 紀正) (1943-), Japanese rower
