= Antun Ivanković =

Croatian rower

Personal information
- Nationality: Croatian
- Born: 25 March 1939 (age 85); Debelica, Yugoslavia

Sport
- Sport: Rowing

Antun Ivanković (born 25 March 1939) is a Croatian rower. He competed in the men's coxless pair event at the 1960 Summer Olympics.
