= Peter Bolliger =

Swiss rower (1937–2024)

Personal information
- Born: 18 May 1937 Basel, Switzerland
- Died: 18 March 2024 (aged 86)

Sport
- Sport: Rowing
Medal record
Men's rowing
Bronze medal – third place	1968 Mexico City	Coxed four
European Rowing Championships
Bronze medal – third place	1965 Duisburg	Coxed four
Bronze medal – third place	1969 Klagenfurt	Coxed four

Peter Bolliger (18 May 1937 – 18 March 2024) was a Swiss rower who competed in the 1964 Summer Olympics and in the 1968 Summer Olympics.

== Biography ==
Peter Bolliger was born in Basel, Switzerland on 18 May 1937.

In 1964 he finished seventh with his partner Nicolas Gobet in the coxless pair event.

Four years later, at the 1968 Summer Olympics he won the bronze medal with the Swiss boat in the coxed four competition.

Bolliger died in March 2024, at the age of 86.
