= Libbis =

Libbis is a family name, or surname which came to England and Germany via French Protestants (Huguenots) who were being oppressed by the majority Catholics in France, and were moving to Protestant majority countries. Libbis family records also date back to Norfolk and Suffolk from the 17th century and there are records of the family throughout East Anglia over the centuries.

Members of the Libbis family immigrated to Australia between 1870–1890.

Other spellings for Libbis in various historical records are: Libbas, Libbus, Libbs, Libbers, Libbens.

== Prominent people with the surname of Libbis ==
- Reg Libbis was an Australian Rower who represented Australia in the 1956 Olympic Games.
- U.S. Republican senator Trent Lott is a direct descendant of Libbis family members (through his mother Iona) who left France in the mid 18th century.
- Australian rules footballer William (Billy) Libbis was a key member of Collingwood’s 1927–1930 4 in a row premierships in the V.F.L

== Notes ==
Note: Any references to St Nicholas, Newcastle on the IGI under Libbis are misattributions of records from St Nicholas, Great Yarmouth and the same applies for misattributions that say Earsdon by North Shields, but should say St Edmund's, Southwold.
