= Michael Schwan =

German rower (born 1939)

Personal information
- Born: 5 November 1939 (age 86) Konstanz, Germany

Sport
- Sport: Rowing
Medal record
Men's rowing
Representing Germany
Olympic Games
Bronze medal – third place	1964 Tokyo	Coxless pair
Representing West Germany
World Rowing Championships
Gold medal – first place	1966 Bled	Eight
European Rowing Championships
Silver medal – second place	1964 Amsterdam	Coxless pair
Silver medal – second place	1965 Duisburg	Coxless four

Michael Schwan (born 5 November 1939) is a German rower who competed for the United Team of Germany in the 1964 Summer Olympics.

In 1964, he won the bronze medal with his partner Wolfgang Hottenrott in the coxless pairs event.
