= James Wynne =

James Wynne may refer to:

- James Wynne (rugby league) (born 1976), Australian rugby player for France
- James Wynne (rower) (born 1937), American Olympian
- James J. Wynne, American physicist
- James Wynne (died 1709), soldier and MP for County Leitrim (Parliament of Ireland constituency)
- James Wynne (died 1748), MP for County Sligo (Parliament of Ireland constituency)

== See also ==
- James Wynn (disambiguation)
