= Roger Jackson (rower) =

Canadian rower

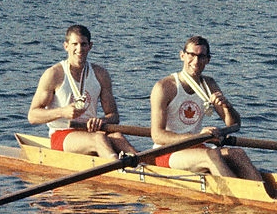
- George Hungerford and Roger Jackson (right) at the 1964 Olympics

Personal information
- Born: Roger Charles Jackson; January 14, 1942 (age 84) Toronto, Ontario, Canada
- Height: 1.99 m (6 ft 6 in)
- Weight: 86 kg (190 lb)

Sport
- Sport: Rowing
- Club: UBC Thunderbirds, Vancouver
Medal record
Men's rowing
Representing Canada
Olympic Games
Gold medal – first place	1964 Tokyo	Coxless pair

Roger Charles Jackson, OC AOE (born January 14, 1942) is a Canadian academic and Olympic gold medallist rower. He won the only gold medal for Canada at the 1964 Summer Olympics, in the coxless pair with George Hungerford. The same year they were awarded the Lou Marsh Trophy. Jackson also competed at the 1968 Olympics and finished eleventh in the single sculls event. At the 1972 Olympics he was a crew member of the Canadian boat which finished twelfth in the coxed fours competition.

== Biography ==
In 1959 Jackson enrolled to the University of Western Ontario where he started training in rowing. In 1963 he received a Bachelor of Arts degree and entered a graduate school at the University of Toronto, but shortly transferred to the University of British Columbia aiming to qualify for the 1964 Olympics. He did qualify, but his partner, Donald Pretty, had to be replaced by George Hungerford. Jackson and Hungerford first competed together at the Olympics, yet they won the gold medal.

In 1967 Jackson graduated with a master's degree in physical education and then entered the University of Wisconsin. He defended a Ph.D. in biodynamics in 1971 and for his post-doctoral studies went to the University of Copenhagen. After retiring from rowing he became active as a sports and medial administrator. He was the Director of Sport Canada from 1976 through 1978 and was President for three terms of the Canadian Olympic Committee (1982 through 1990). From 1978 to 1988, he was the Dean of the Faculty of Kinesiology at the University of Calgary. He was the founder and Director of the University of Calgary Sport Medicine Centre.

== Awards and honors ==
In 1964, Jackson was inducted into Canada's Sports Hall of Fame. In 1983, he was made an Officer of the Order of Canada. In 2005, he was appointed Chief Executive Officer of Own the Podium 2010 and inducted into the University of British Columbia Sports Hall of Fame. In 2009, he was named by CBC sports as one of the 25 most influential Canadians in sports for 2009. In 2012, Jackson was appointed to the Alberta Order of Excellence. In June 2015, he received an honorary degree from Western University in London, Ontario.

During the 1976 Canada Cup hockey tournament, Jackson participated in the postgame ceremony following the Canada-Sweden game in Toronto. He presented an award to Sweden's player of the game.
