= Andrey Arkhipov =

Soviet rower

Personal information
- Born: 21 April 1931
- Died: 12 January 2017 (aged 85)

Sport
- Sport: Rowing

Andrey Arkhipov (Russian: Андрей Архипов; 21 April 1931 – 12 January 2017) was a Russian rower who represented the Soviet Union. He competed at the 1956 Summer Olympics in Melbourne with the men's coxed four where they were eliminated in the semi-final.
