= Bob Rogers (rower) =

American rower

Personal information
- Born: March 28, 1934 Portland, Oregon, United States
- Died: July 9, 2017 (aged 83) Edmonds, Washington, United States

Sport
- Sport: Rowing

Bob Rogers (March 28, 1934 – July 9, 2017) was an American rower. He competed in the men's coxless pair event at the 1960 Summer Olympics.
