= Clive Marshall =

British rower

Personal information
- Nationality: British
- Born: 1 January 1939 (age 87) Nottingham, England

Sport
- Sport: Rowing
- Club: Nottingham Britannia

Clive L. Marshall (born 1 January 1939) is a British rower. He competed in the men's coxless pair event at the 1960 Summer Olympics.

In 1960, Marshall finished runner-up in the Silver Goblets & Nickalls' Challenge Cup (the premier coxless pair event) at the Henley Royal Regatta, rowing for Nottingham Britannia.
