= Douglas Turner (rower) =

American rower, journalist, and newspaper executive (1932–2018)

Personal information
- Full name: Douglas Laird Turner
- Born: January 5, 1932 Buffalo, New York, U.S.
- Died: November 4, 2018 (aged 86) Springfield, Virginia, U.S.

Sport
- Sport: Rowing

Douglas Laird Turner (January 5, 1932 – November 4, 2018) was an American rower, journalist and newspaper executive. He competed in the men's coxed four event at the 1956 Summer Olympics.

Turner graduated from Brown University in 1954. The following year he enlisted in the United States Army and served two years as a Special Agent for Counter Intelligence. In 1957 he went to work for the Buffalo Courier-Express where he served in several editorial positions eventually becoming Executive Editor. After the closing of the Courier Express he became Washington Bureau Chief of The Buffalo News, serving in that capacity from 1982 to 2007.
