= Ronald Cardwell =

American rower (1932–2008)

Personal information
- Full name: Ronald Edmund Cardwell
- Nationality: American
- Born: September 1, 1932 Buffalo, New York, U.S.
- Died: December 29, 2008 (aged 76) Weymouth, Massachusetts, U.S.

Sport
- Sport: Rowing

Ronald Edmund Cardwell (September 1, 1932 – December 29, 2008) was an American rower. He competed in the men's coxed four event at the 1956 Summer Olympics. Cardwell died in Weymouth, Massachusetts on December 29, 2008, at the age of 76.
