= James McMullen (rower) =

American rower

Personal information
- Born: June 12, 1939 (age 87) Buffalo, New York, United States

Sport
- Sport: Rowing

James McMullen (born June 12, 1939) is an American rower. He competed in the men's coxed four event at the 1956 Summer Olympics.
