= Ricardo González (rower) =

Argentine rower

Personal information
- Born: 24 April 1937 (age 89) Rosario, Argentina

Sport
- Sport: Rowing

Ricardo González (born 24 April 1937) is an Argentine rower. He competed in the men's coxless pair event at the 1960 Summer Olympics.
