= Ted Frost =

American rower (1932–2018)

Personal information
- Nationality: American
- Born: April 6, 1932 Seattle, Washington, United States
- Died: November 6, 2018 (aged 86)

Sport
- Sport: Rowing

Ted Frost (April 6, 1932 – November 6, 2018) was an American rower. He competed in the men's coxless pair event at the 1960 Summer Olympics.
