= Víctor Puente =

Peruvian rower

Personal information
- Born: 2 September 1941 (age 83); Lima, Peru

Sport
- Sport: Rowing

Víctor Puente (born 2 September 1941) is a Peruvian rower. He competed in the men's coxless pair event at the 1960 Summer Olympics.
