= Ricardo Durán =

Argentine rower (1938–2026)

Personal information
- Nationality: Argentine
- Born: 20 September 1938
- Died: 22 October 2026 (aged 88)

Sport
- Sport: Rowing

Ricardo Durán (20 September 1938 – 22 October 2026) was an Argentine rower. He competed in the men's coxless pair event at the 1964 Summer Olympics.

Durán died on 22 October 2026, at the age of 88.
