= Yaroslav Cherstvy =

Russian rower (1933–2026)

Personal information
- Native name: Ярослав Филиппович Черствый
- Born: 7 May 1933
- Died: 22 February 2026 (aged 92)

Sport
- Sport: Rowing
- Club: Trud Leningrad
Medal record
Men's rowing
Representing the Soviet Union
World Rowing Championships
Silver medal – second place	1962 Lucerne	Eight
European Rowing Championships
Silver medal – second place	1956 Bled	Coxed four
Silver medal – second place	1957 Duisburg	Eight
Bronze medal – third place	1958 Poznań	Eight
Bronze medal – third place	1959 Mâcon	Eight

Yaroslav Filippovich Cherstvy (Russian: Ярослав Филиппович Черствый; 7 May 1933 – 22 February 2026) was a Russian rower who represented the Soviet Union.

== Biography ==
Cherstvy went to the 1956 European Rowing Championships in Bled where he won a silver medal with the coxed four. He competed at the 1956 Summer Olympics in Melbourne with the men's coxed four where they got eliminated in the semi-final. As a member of his rowing club Trud Leningrad he won the Grand Challenge Cup in 1958 as part of the Henley Royal Regatta.

At the 1962 World Rowing Championships in Lucerne, he won silver with the men's eight.

Cherstvy died on 22 February 2026, at the age of 92.
