= Luciano Sgheiz =

Italian rower

Personal information
- Born: 20 December 1941 (age 84) Colico, Italy
- Height: 181 cm (5 ft 11 in)
- Weight: 83 kg (183 lb)
- Relatives: Romano Sgheiz (brother)

Sport
- Sport: Rowing
Medal record
Men's rowing
Representing Italy
European Rowing Championships
Bronze medal – third place	1964 Amsterdam	Coxless four

Luciano Sgheiz (born 20 December 1941) was an Italian rower.

Sgheiz was born in Colico in 1941. Romano Sgheiz (born 1937) is his brother. He competed for Italy in the 1964 European Rowing Championships in Amsterdam in the coxless four competition where he won a bronze medal. The same team competed two months later in the coxless four at the 1964 Summer Olympics where they came fifth. He then competed in the coxed four at the 1968 Summer Olympics where they came fourth.
