= Gordon Cowey =

Australian rower

Personal information
- Nationality: Australian
- Born: 1 September 1930
- Died: 27 March 1999 (aged 68)

Sport
- Sport: Rowing

Gordon Cowey (1 September 1930 – 27 March 1999) is an Australian rower. He competed in the men's coxed four event at the 1956 Summer Olympics.
