= Oleg Golovanov =

Russian rower (1934–2019)

Personal information
- Born: 17 December 1934 Leningrad, Russian SFSR, Soviet Union
- Died: 24 May 2019 (aged 84)

Sport
- Sport: Rowing
Medal record
Men's rowing
Representing the Soviet Union
Olympic Games
Gold medal – first place	1960 Rome	Coxless pair
World Rowing Championships
Silver medal – second place	1962 Lucerne	Coxless pair
European Championships
Silver medal – second place	1959 Mâcon	Coxless pair

Oleg Sergeevich Golovanov (Russian: Олег Серге́евич Голованов; 17 December 1934 – 24 May 2019) was a Russian rower who competed for the Soviet Union in the 1960 Summer Olympics and in the 1964 Summer Olympics.

He was born in Leningrad. In 1960 he and his partner Valentin Boreyko won the gold medal in the coxless pair event. Fours years later he and Valentin Boreyko were eliminated in the repêchage of the coxless pair competition.
