= Estuardo Masías =

Peruvian rower

Personal information
- Born: 19 July 1940 Cusco, Peru
- Died: 2 December 2025 (aged 85)

Sport
- Sport: Rowing

Estuardo Masías (19 July 1940 – 2 December 2025) was a Peruvian rower. He competed in the men's coxless pair event at the 1960 Summer Olympics.
