= Carlos Montaldo =

Argentine rower (1940–2025)

Personal information
- Full name: Carlos Rodolfo Montaldo
- Nationality: Argentine
- Born: 24 January 1940
- Died: 9 April 2025 (aged 85)

Sport
- Sport: Rowing

Carlos Montaldo (24 January 1940 – 9 April 2025) was an Argentine rower. He competed in the men's coxless pair event at the 1964 Summer Olympics. Montaldo died on 9 April 2025, at the age of 85.
