= James Edmonds (rower) =

American rower

Personal information
- Born: June 4, 1938 Elmira, New York, United States
- Died: January 25, 2023 (aged 84)

Sport
- Sport: Rowing

James Edmonds (June 4, 1938 – January 25, 2023) was an American rower. He competed in the men's coxless pair event at the 1964 Summer Olympics.
