= Ivo Stefanoni =

Italian rowing cox

Personal information
- Nationality: Italian
- Born: 5 June 1936 (age 90) Mandello del Lario, Italy
- Height: 165 cm (5 ft 5 in)
- Weight: 55 kg (121 lb)

Sport
- Club: GS Moto Guzzi
Medal record
Representing Italy
Men's rowing
Olympic Games
Gold medal – first place	1956 Melbourne	Coxed four
Bronze medal – third place	1960 Rome	Coxed four
European Rowing Championships
Gold medal – first place	1957 Duisburg	Eight
Gold medal – first place	1958 Poznań	Eight
Gold medal – first place	1961 Prague	Eight
Bronze medal – third place	1956 Bled	Coxed four

Ivo Stefanoni (born 5 June 1936) is an Italian rowing cox and Olympic champion.

Stefanoni was born in Mandello del Lario in 1936, and he rowed with GS Moto Guzzi.

At the 1956 European Rowing Championships, Stefanoni won a bronze medal with the coxed four. Later that year, he received a gold medal in the coxed four event at the 1956 Summer Olympics in Melbourne, together with Alberto Winkler, Angelo Vanzin, Romano Sgheiz and Franco Trincavelli.

For the 1957 European Rowing Championships, Stefanoni changed to the eight and won gold; he repeated this success at the 1958 European Rowing Championships. At the 1960 Summer Olympics, he won the bronze medal with the Italian boat in the coxed four competition.

For the 1961 European Rowing Championships, Stefanoni was back in the eight and they won gold. Three rowers from the 1961 crew remained with the Italian eight that competed at the 1964 Summer Olympics and came sixth: Giampietro Gilardi, Sereno Brunello and Stefanoni.
