= John Hunt (rower) =

Australian rower (1934–2005)

John Atlee Hunt
Personal information
- Nationality: Australian
- Born: 11 September 1934; Western Australia, Australia
- Died: 13 January 2005 (aged 70); Melbourne, Australia

Sport
- Sport: Rowing
- Club: MUBC

Achievements and titles
- National finals: King's Cup 1957 & 59

John Atlee Hunt (11 September 1934 – 13 January 2005) was an Australian representative rower. He competed in the men's coxless pair event at the 1960 Summer Olympics. He was the founder of the successful Australian retail business Hunt Leather.

== Varsity, club and state rowing ==
Hunt's senior club rowing was from the Melbourne University Boat Club (MUBC). At the 1953 Australian University Championships he won the single sculls title in MUBC colours, the following year he was in the MUBC eight that won the Australian University Championship titles. Between 1956 and 1960 he won four Victorian state titles across three sweep oared boat classes.

Hunt first made state selection for Victoria in the 1957 men's eight that contested and won the King's Cup at the Australian Interstate Regatta. He was also in the Victorian 1959 King's Cup eight when they won a silver medal.

== International representative rowing ==
In 1960, on the strength of their Victorian state title win, Hunt and his MUBC teammate Terry Davies were selected to race Australia's coxless pair at the 1960 Tokyo Olympics. They were eliminated in the repechage.

== Family and business ==
John Hunt was the grandson of Atlee Arthur Hunt, a federation era Australian public servant.

John and his wife Elizabeth started the Hunt Leather Australian luggage and leathergoods retail business in 1975. The business has been largely successful over its 50 year history and as of 2023 was still family owned and run by their daughter Sophie as CEO.

Hunt died on 13 January 2005, at the age of 70.

== Sources ==
- Hunt at World Rowing
