= Anatoly Fetisov =

Russian coxswain

Personal information
- Born: 1940 (age 84–85)

Sport
- Sport: Rowing

Anatoly Fetisov (Russian: Анатолий Фетисов; born 1940) is a Russian coxswain who represented the Soviet Union. He competed at the 1956 Summer Olympics in Melbourne with the men's coxed four where they were eliminated in the semi-final.
