= Pablo Ferrero =

Argentine rower

Personal information
- Born: 6 September 1939 Rosario, Argentina
- Died: 1 September 2013 (aged 73)

Sport
- Sport: Rowing

Pablo Ferrero (6 September 1939 – 1 September 2013) was an Argentine rower. He competed in the men's coxless pair event at the 1960 Summer Olympics.
