= Romano Sgheiz =

Italian rower

Personal information
- Born: 28 June 1937 (age 89) Colico, Lecco, Italy
- Relatives: Luciano Sgheiz (brother)
Medal record
Representing Italy
Men's rowing
Olympic Games
Gold medal – first place	1956 Melbourne	Coxed four
Bronze medal – third place	1960 Rome	Coxed four
European Rowing Championships
Gold medal – first place	1957 Duisburg	Eight
Gold medal – first place	1958 Poznań	Eight
Gold medal – first place	1961 Prague	Eight
Silver medal – second place	1963 Copenhagen	Coxless four
Bronze medal – third place	1956 Bled	Coxed four
Bronze medal – third place	1964 Amsterdam	Coxless four

Romano Sgheiz (born 28 June 1937) is an Italian competition rower and Olympic champion.

Sgheiz was born in Colico, Italy, in 1937. Luciano Sgheiz (born 1941) is his brother.

At the 1956 European Rowing Championships, he won a bronze medal with the coxed four. Later that year, he received a gold medal in coxed four at the 1956 Summer Olympics in Melbourne, together with Alberto Winkler, Angelo Vanzin, Franco Trincavelli and Ivo Stefanoni. At the 1957 European Rowing Championships, he won a gold medal with the eight. In the following year, he regained the European championship title with the eight.

He received a bronze medal in the coxed four at the 1960 Summer Olympics in Rome. At the 1961 European Rowing Championships, he won yet another gold medal with the eight. At the 1963 European Rowing Championships, he won a silver medal with the coxless four. At the 1964 European Rowing Championships, he won a bronze medal with the coxless four. The same team came fifth at the 1964 Summer Olympics in the coxless four competition. Sgheiz retired after the 1964 Olympics but returned to competitive rowing for the 1968 Summer Olympics, where he gained a fourth place with the coxless four.
