= John Jenkinson (rowing) =

Australian coxswain

Personal information
- Nationality: Australian
- Born: 6 July 1941 (age 83)

Sport
- Sport: Rowing

John Jenkinson (born 6 July 1941) is an Australian coxswain. He competed in the men's coxed four event at the 1956 Summer Olympics.
