= Kevin McMahon (rower) =

Australian rower

Personal information
- Nationality: Australian
- Born: 28 November 1938
- Died: 18 July 2007 (aged 68) Albany, Western Australia

Sport
- Sport: Rowing

Kevin McMahon (28 November 1938 – 18 July 2007) was an Australian rower. He competed in the men's coxed four event at the 1956 Summer Olympics.
