= Jochen Neuling =

West German rower

Personal information
- Born: 10 February 1938 (age 87); Rohrberg, Germany
- Height: 189 cm (6 ft 2 in)
- Weight: 83 kg (183 lb)

Sport
- Sport: Rowing

Jochen Neuling (born 10 February 1938) is an East German rower who represented the United Team of Germany. He competed at the 1960 Summer Olympics in Rome with the men's coxless pair where they came fourth.
