= Czesław Nawrot =

Polish rower (1942–2019)

Personal information
- Nationality: Polish
- Born: 11 March 1942; Baszków, Poland
- Died: 20 May 2019 (aged 77); Zakopane, Poland

Sport
- Sport: Rowing

Czesław Nawrot (11 March 1942 – 20 May 2019) was a Polish rower. He competed in the men's coxless pair event at the 1964 Summer Olympics.
