= Heinz Weigel =

German rower (born 1938)

Personal information
- Born: 11 April 1938 (age 88) Halberstadt, Germany
- Height: 185 cm (6 ft 1 in)
- Weight: 81 kg (179 lb)

Sport
- Sport: Rowing

Heinz Weigel (born 11 April 1938) is an East German rower who represented the United Team of Germany. He competed at the 1960 Summer Olympics in Rome with the men's coxless pair where they came fourth.
