= Franco Trincavelli =

Italian rower

Personal information
- Nationality: Italian
- Born: 7 June 1935
- Died: 9 November 1983 (aged 48)
Medal record
Representing Italy
Men's rowing
Olympic Games
Gold medal – first place	1956 Melbourne	Coxed four
Bronze medal – third place	1960 Rome	Coxed four
European Rowing Championships
Bronze medal – third place	1956 Bled	Coxed four
Gold medal – first place	1957 Duisburg	Eight

Franco Trincavelli (7 June 1935 – 9 November 1983) was an Italian competition rower and Olympic champion. He received a gold medal in coxed fours at the 1956 Summer Olympics in Melbourne, together with Alberto Winkler, Angelo Vanzin, Romano Sgheiz and Ivo Stefanoni. He received a bronze medal at the 1960 Summer Olympics in Rome.
