= Richard Nicholson (rower) =

British rower

Personal information
- Nationality: British
- Born: 22 November 1937 (age 88) Nottingham, England

Sport
- Sport: Rowing
- Club: Nottingham & Union Rowing Club

Richard J Nicholson (born 22 November 1937) is a retired British rower. He competed in the men's coxless pair event at the 1960 Summer Olympics. He was selected to represent Britain again at the 1966 World Rowing Championships partnering R C Waite in the coxless pair, they finished in 11th place overall after a fifth-place finish in the B final.
