= Bertil Göransson =

Swedish rower

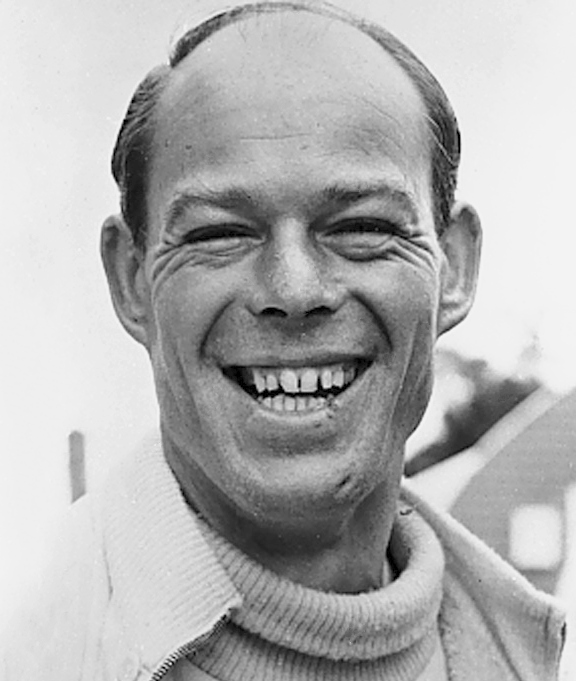

Personal information
- Born: 9 February 1919 Limhamn, Sweden
- Died: 10 April 2004 (aged 85) Vårgårda, Sweden

Sport
- Sport: Rowing
- Club: Roddklubben Three Towns
Medal record
Representing Sweden
Olympic Games
Silver medal – second place	1956 Melbourne	Coxed four
European Rowing Championships
Silver medal – second place	1955 Ghent	Coxed four
Silver medal – second place	1955 Ghent	Eight

Bertil Edvard Göransson (9 February 1919 – 10 April 2004) was a Swedish rowing coxswain who competed in the 1956 Summer Olympics. He won a silver medal in the coxed fours and finished fourth in the eights competition. He won two silver medals in these events at the 1955 European Championships.
