= Angelo Vanzin =

Italian rower

Personal information
- Born: 8 February 1932 Lierna, Italy
- Died: 22 May 2018 (aged 86) Lierna, Italy

Sport
- Country: Italy
Medal record
Men's rowing
Representing Italy
Olympic Games
Gold medal – first place	1956 Melbourne	Coxed four
European Rowing Championships
Bronze medal – third place	1956 Bled	Coxed four
Gold medal – first place	1957 Duisburg	Eight

Angelo Vanzin (8 February 1932 – 22 May 2018) was an Italian competition rower and Olympic champion. He won a gold medal in the coxed four event at the 1956 Summer Olympics in Melbourne, together with Romano Sgheiz, Alberto Winkler, Franco Trincavelli and Ivo Stefanoni.

== See also ==
- Italy at the 1956 Summer Olympics
