= George Hungerford =

Canadian lawyer and rower

George William Hungerford
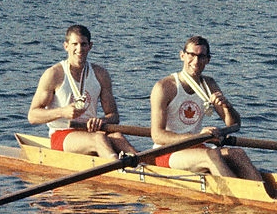
- George Hungerford (left) and Roger Jackson at the 1964 Olympics

Personal information
- Nationality: Canadian
- Born: George William Hungerford; January 2, 1944 (age 82) Vancouver, British Columbia, Canada
- Height: 1.95 m (6 ft 5 in)
- Weight: 96 kg (212 lb)

Sport
- Sport: Rowing
- Club: UBC Thunderbirds, Vancouver
Medal record
Men's rowing
Representing Canada
Olympic Games
Gold medal – first place	1964 Tokyo	Coxless pair

George William Hungerford, OC OBC (born January 2, 1944) is a Canadian lawyer and retired rower. He won the only gold medal for Canada at the 1964 Summer Olympics, in coxless pairs with Roger Jackson. The same year they were awarded the Lou Marsh Trophy.

Hungerford was supposed to compete at the 1964 Olympics in the eights, but had to withdraw due to a bout of mononucleosis and was replaced by Wayne Pretty. This replacement left a vacancy in the Canadian coxless pair, which was filled up by Hungerford. Jackson and Hungerford had their first competitive race together at the Olympics, yet they won the gold medal in a close contest with the Dutch duo.

Hungerford attended High School at Shawnigan Lake School on Vancouver Island where he learned to row, after high school he went on to receive a Bachelor of Arts degree in 1965 and a Bachelor of Laws degree in 1968 both from the University of British Columbia. He was called to the Bar of British Columbia in 1969. As of 2013, he worked as a corporate attorney at his own firm, the George W. Hungerford Law Corporation, and was also involved in sports administration.

Hungerford was inducted into Canada's Sports (1964), British Columbia Sports (1966), the Canadian Olympic (1971), and the University of British Columbia Sports (1994) Halls of Fame. In 1984, he was made an Officer of the Order of Canada and in 2013 was appointed to the Order of British Columbia.

His niece, Rebecca Marino, is a professional tennis player and was ranked as high as No. 38 in the world in July 2011.
