= Nikola Čupin =

Croatian rower (1938–2018)

Personal information
- Nationality: Croatian
- Born: 13 November 1938 Vodice, Yugoslavia
- Died: 22 October 2018 (aged 79)

Sport
- Sport: Rowing

Nikola Čupin (13 November 1938 – 22 October 2018) was a Croatian rower. He competed in the men's coxless pair event at the 1960 Summer Olympics.
