= Walter Knabenhans (rower) =

Swiss rower (1929–2018)

Personal information
- Nationality: Swiss
- Born: 9 November 1929; Zürich, Switzerland
- Died: 2 March 2018 (aged 88); Zürich, Switzerland

Sport
- Sport: Rowing

Walter Knabenhans (9 November 1929 – 2 March 2018) was a Swiss rower. He competed in the men's coxless pair event at the 1960 Summer Olympics. Knabenhans died in Zürich on 2 March 2018, at the age of 88.
