= Valentin Boreyko =

Russian rower (1933–2012)

Personal information
- Born: 7 October 1933 Leningrad, Russian SFSR, Soviet Union
- Died: 27 December 2012 (aged 79) Saint Petersburg, Russia

Sport
- Sport: Rowing
Medal record
Men's rowing
Representing the Soviet Union
Olympic Games
Gold medal – first place	1960 Rome	Coxless pair
World Rowing Championships
Silver medal – second place	1962 Lucerne	Coxless pair
European Championships
Silver medal – second place	1959 Mâcon	Coxless pair

Valentin Vasilevich Boreyko (Russian: Валентин Васильевич Борейко; 7 October 1933 – 27 December 2012) was a Russian rower who competed for the Soviet Union in the 1960 Summer Olympics and in the 1964 Summer Olympics.

He was born in Leningrad. In 1960 he and his partner Oleg Golovanov won the gold medal in the coxless pair event. Fours years later he and Oleg Golovanov were eliminated in the repêchage of the coxless pair competition.
