= Ricardo de Carvalho =

Brazilian rower

Personal information
- Full name: Ricardo Esteves de Carvalho
- Born: 7 March 1961 (age 65) Rio de Janeiro, Brazil

Sport
- Sport: Rowing
Medal record
Representing Brazil
Pan American Games
Gold medal – first place	1983 Caracas	Coxless pair
Gold medal – first place	1987 Indianapolis	Coxless pair
Summer Universiade
Silver medal – second place	1987 Zagreb	Coxless pair

Ricardo Esteves de Carvalho (born 7 March 1961) is a Brazilian rower. He competed at the 1980 Summer Olympics, 1984 Summer Olympics and the 1988 Summer Olympics. Gold medalist in 2 Pan-American Games, in Caracas 1983 and Indianapolis 1987 with his brother Ronaldo de Carvalho. Their father, José de Carvalho Filho was their coach.
