= James Wynn =

James Wynn may refer to:

- Big Jim Wynn (1908-1977), American jump blues musician
- Jimmy Wynn (footballer) (1910-1986), English footballer, played for Southport, Rotherham Utd, and Rochdale
- Jimmy Wynn (1942-2020), American baseball player
- James Andrew Wynn (born 1954), American jurist
- James Wynn (actor), British actor, author and film maker

== See also ==
- James Wynne (disambiguation)
