= Takao Kogo =

Japanese rower (born 1941)

Personal information
- Nationality: Japanese
- Born: 15 May 1941 (age 84)

Sport
- Sport: Rowing

Takao Kogo (向後 隆男, Kōgo Takao, born 15 May 1941) is a Japanese rower. He competed in the men's coxless pair event at the 1964 Summer Olympics.
