= David Lee Nicholson =

British rower

Jim Lee Nicholson
Personal information
- Nationality: British (English)
- Born: 31 January 1938 Scarborough, England
- Died: 7 January 1967 (aged 28) Doncaster, England
- Height: 190 cm (6 ft 3 in)
- Weight: 83 kg (183 lb)

Sport
- Sport: Rowing
- Club: University of London BC
Medal record
Rowing
Representing England
British Empire & Commonwealth Games
Gold medal – first place	1962 Perth	coxless pair

James David Lee Nicholson (31 January 1938 – 7 January 1967) was a British rower who competed in the men's coxless pair event at the 1964 Summer Olympics.

== Biography ==
Nicholson was educated at Rossall School, Fleetwood and studied medicine at Trinity College, Oxford.

He represented Great Britain in the inaugural 1962 World Rowing Championships with Stewart Farquharson in the coxless pairs, in which they won the B final.

He also represented England and won a gold medal in the coxless pair with Stewart Farquharson, at the 1962 British Empire and Commonwealth Games in Perth, Western Australia. They both rowed for the University of London Boat Club at the time. Nicholson died in a four-vehicle crash near Doncaster in 1967.
