= Alberto Winkler =

Italian rower

Personal information
- Born: 13 February 1932 Castelbello-Ciardes, Italy
- Died: 14 June 1981 (aged 49) Mandello del Lario, Italy

Sport
- Country: Italy

Achievements and titles
- Olympic finals: 1956 Coxed fours gold
Medal record
Men's rowing
Representing Italy
Olympic Games
Gold medal – first place	1956 Australia	Coxed four
European Championships
Bronze medal – third place	1956 Bled	Coxed four
Gold medal – first place	1957 Duisburg	Eight
Gold medal – first place	1958 Poznań	Eight

Alberto Winkler (13 February 1932 – 14 June 1981) was an Italian competition rower and Olympic champion.

He received a gold medal in the coxed four event at the 1956 Summer Olympics in Melbourne, together with Romano Sgheiz, Angelo Vanzin, Franco Trincavelli and Ivo Stefanoni.
