= José Hurdado =

Cuban rower

Personal information
- Nationality: Cuban
- Born: 8 February 1937 (age 88)

Sport
- Sport: Rowing

José Hurdado (born 8 February 1937) is a Cuban rower. He competed in the men's coxed four event at the 1956 Summer Olympics.
