= Peter Lucas (rower) =

New Zealand rower

Peter Lucas (8 June 1933 – 19 July 2001) was a New Zealand rower.

He competed for New Zealand in the 1956 Summer Olympics at Melbourne. He was in the coxed four which came fourth in the semifinal and did not qualify.

Lucas died in 2001 and was buried at Waitara Cemetery.
