= Peter Christiansen (rower) =

Danish rower

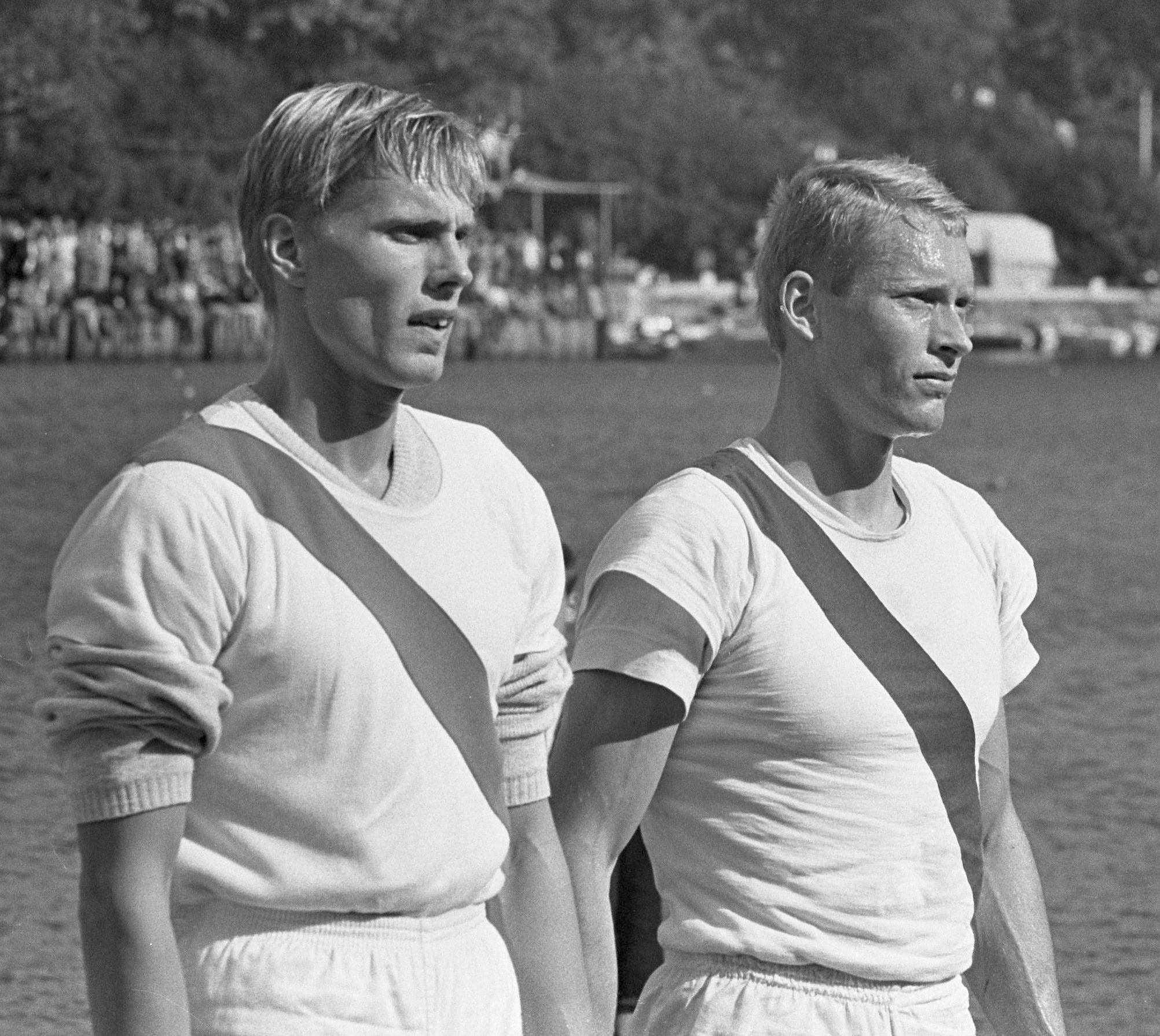
- Hans Jørgen Boye and Peter Christiansen in 1965

Personal information
- Born: 4 April 1941 (age 85) Frederiksberg, Denmark
- Height: 1.82 m (6 ft 0 in)
- Weight: 78 kg (172 lb)

Sport
- Sport: Rowing
- Club: Lyngby Roklub, Lyngby-Taarbæk
Medal record
Representing Denmark
Olympic Games
Bronze medal – third place	1968 Mexico City	Coxless pair
European Rowing Championships
Gold medal – first place	1965 Duisburg	Coxless pair
Bronze medal – third place	1964 Amsterdam	Coxless pair
Bronze medal – third place	1969 Klagenfurt	Coxless pair

Peter Fich Christiansen (born 4 April 1941) is a Danish retired rower who had his best achievements in the coxless pairs. In this event, he won two European medals, in 1964 and 1965 together with Hans Jørgen Boye; they also finished in fifth place at the 1964 Summer Olympics. At the 1968 Games, Christiansen rowed with Ib Larsen and won a bronze medal. Four years later, he competed in the coxless fours and ended in sixth place.
