= Nelson Guarda =

Brazilian rower (1933–2002)

Personal information
- Born: 26 November 1933; Rio Grande do Sul, Brazil
- Died: 31 January 2002 (aged 68)

Sport
- Sport: Rowing

Nelson Guarda (26 November 1933 – 31 January 2002) was a Brazilian rower. He competed in the men's coxed four event at the 1956 Summer Olympics.
