= André Richer =

Brazilian rower

Personal information
- Full name: André Gustavo Richer
- Born: 24 January 1928; Visconde do Rio Branco, Brazil
- Died: 11 April 2018 (aged 90); Rio de Janeiro, Brazil

Sport
- Sport: Rowing

André Gustavo Richer (24 January 1928 – 11 April 2018) was a Brazilian rower and sports manager. He competed in the men's coxed four event at the 1956 Summer Olympics.

Richer was president of the Clube de Regatas do Flamengo from 1969 to 1973, and of the Brazilian Olympic Committee (COB) from 1990 to 1995.
