= Reino Poutanen =

Finnish rower

Personal information
- Born: Reino Richard Poutanen; 21 February 1928 Turku
- Died: 14 April 2007 (aged 79)

Sport
- Sport: Rowing
Medal record
Men's rowing
Representing Finland
Olympic Games
Bronze medal – third place	1956 Melbourne	Coxed four
European Rowing Championships
Bronze medal – third place	1955 Ghent	Coxless four
Gold medal – first place	1956 Bled	Coxed four

Reino Richard Poutanen (21 February 1928 – 14 April 2007) was a Finnish rower who competed in the 1956 Summer Olympics and in the 1960 Summer Olympics. He was born in Turku. In 1956 he was a crew member of the Finnish boat which won the bronze medal in the coxed fours event. He was also part of the Finnish boat which was eliminated in the repêchage of the coxless four competition. Four years later he was eliminated with the Finnish boat in the semi-finals of the coxed four event.
