= Yury Popov =

Russian rower (born 1930)

Personal information
- Born: 19 March 1930
- Died: 30 July 2021 (aged 91)

Sport
- Sport: Rowing
Medal record
Men's rowing
Representing the Soviet Union
European Rowing Championships
Silver medal – second place	1956 Bled	Coxed four
Silver medal – second place	1957 Duisburg	Eight
Bronze medal – third place	1958 Poznań	Eight
Bronze medal – third place	1959 Mâcon	Eight

Yury Popov (Russian: Юрий Попов; 19 March 1930 – 30 July 2021) was a Soviet rower who represented the Soviet Union. He competed at the 1956 Summer Olympics in Melbourne with the men's coxed four where they were eliminated in the semi-final.
