= José Romero Santos =

Cuban rower

Personal information
- Nationality: Cuban
- Born: 26 January 1936 (age 89)

Sport
- Sport: Rowing

José Romero Santos (born 26 January 1936) is a Cuban rower. He competed in the men's coxed four event at the 1956 Summer Olympics.
