= Roberto Retolaza =

Mexican rower (born 1930)

Personal information
- Born: 12 January 1930 (age 95); Mexico City, Mexico

Sport
- Sport: Rowing

Roberto Retolaza (born 12 January 1930) is a Mexican rower. He competed at the 1960 Summer Olympics and the 1968 Summer Olympics.
