= Veli Lehtelä =

Finnish rower (1935–2020)

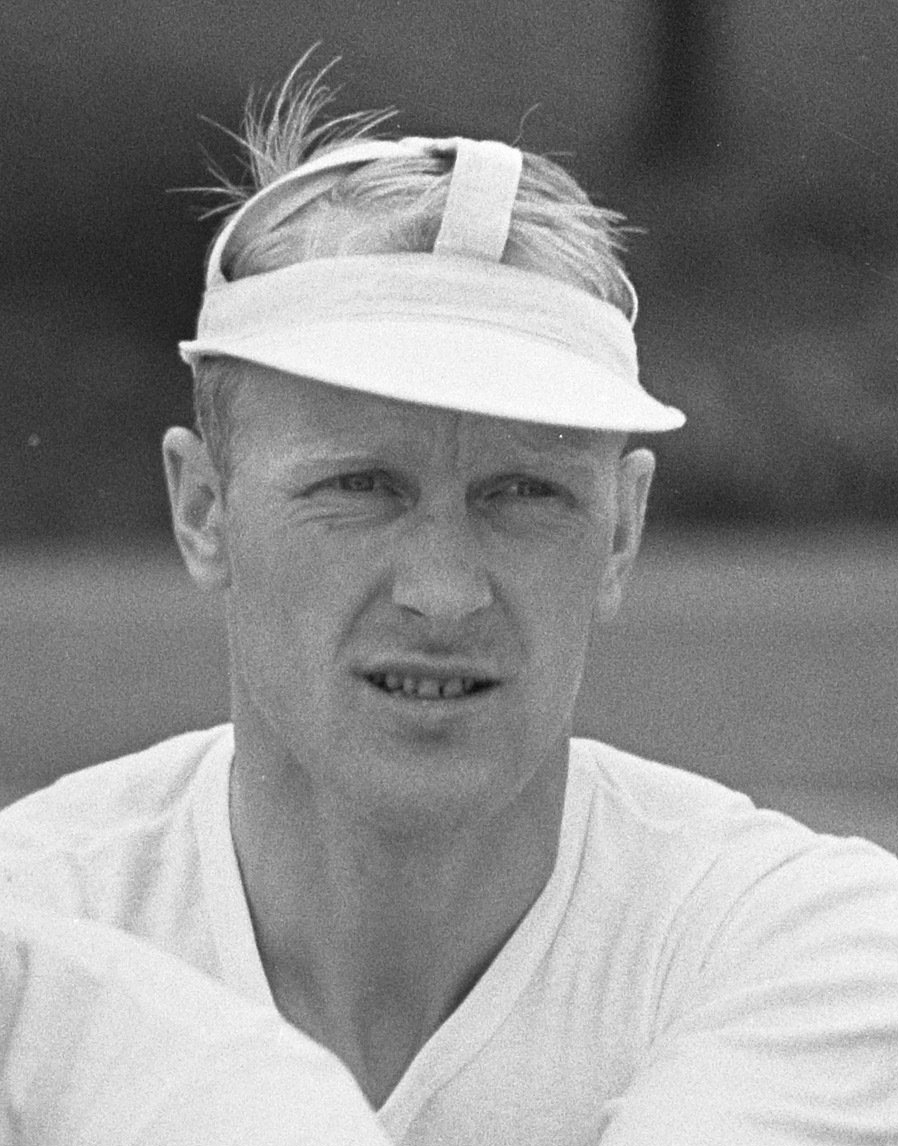
- Lehtelä at the 1964 European Championships

Personal information
- Born: 6 September 1935 Sääksmäki, Finland
- Died: 3 June 2020 (aged 84) Valkeakoski, Finland
- Height: 183 cm (6 ft 0 in)
- Weight: 74–76 kg (163–168 lb)

Sport
- Sport: Rowing
Medal record
Representing Finland
Olympic Games
Bronze medal – third place	1956 Melbourne	Coxed four
Bronze medal – third place	1960 Rome	Coxless pair
European Rowing Championships
Silver medal – second place	1955 Ghent	Coxed pair
Gold medal – first place	1956 Bled	Coxed four
Gold medal – first place	1958 Poznań	Coxless pair
Silver medal – second place	1961 Prague	Coxless pair

Veli Veikko Valtteri Lehtelä (6 September 1935 – 3 June 2020) was a Finnish rower. He competed in various two-man and four man events at the 1956, 1960 and 1964 Olympics and won two bronze medals, in 1956 and 1960. His son Jorma Lehtelä also became an Olympic rower.

Throughout most of his career Lehtelä rowed with Toimi Pitkänen. Besides two Olympic bronze medals, they won two gold and two silver medals at the European championships from 1955 to 1961, and placed sixth at the 1964 Olympics.
