= Kalle Sievänen =

Finnish sports shooter

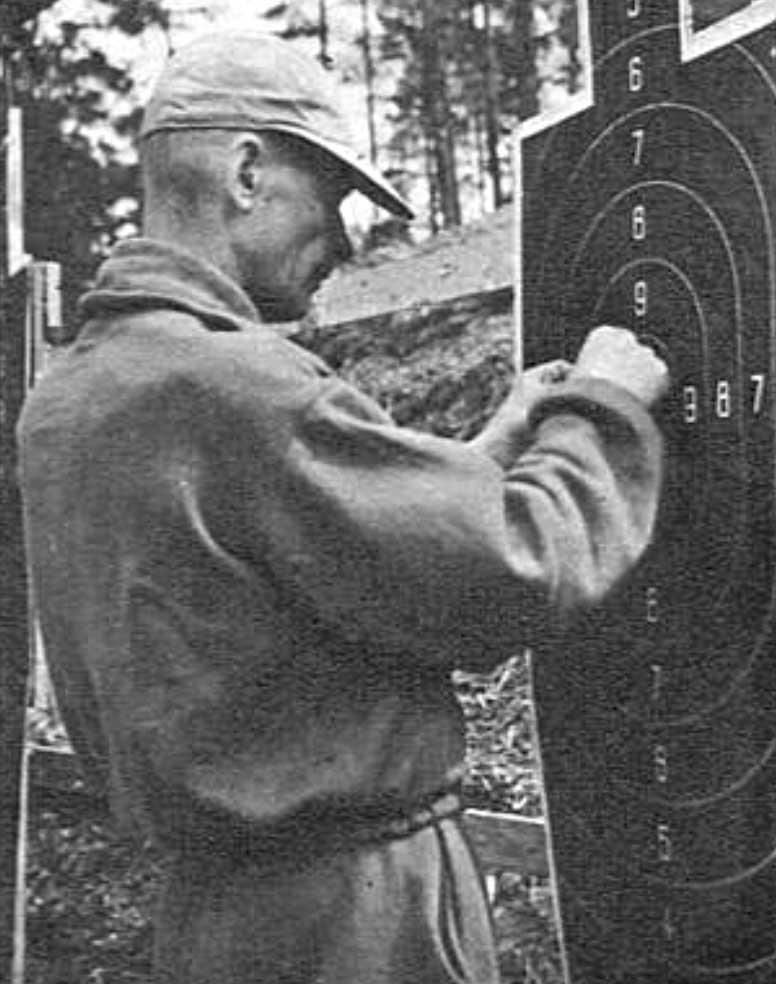

Personal information
- Born: 9 March 1911 Loppi, Finland
- Died: 1 December 1996 (aged 85) Varkaus, Finland

Sport
- Sport: Sports shooting

Kalle Sievänen (9 March 1911 – 1 December 1996) was a Finnish sports shooter. He competed at the 1956, 1960 and 1964 Summer Olympics.
