= Mariano Caulín =

Uruguayan rower (born 1938)

Personal information
- Born: 22 May 1938 (age 87); Montevideo, Uruguay

Sport
- Sport: Rowing

Mariano Caulín (born 22 May 1938) is a Uruguayan rower. He competed at the 1960 Summer Olympics and the 1964 Summer Olympics.
