= Kauko Hänninen =

Finnish rower

Personal information
- Born: Kauko Antero Hänninen; 28 January 1930 Kinnula
- Died: 26 August 2013 (aged 83)

Sport
- Sport: Rowing
Medal record
Men's rowing
Representing Finland
Olympic Games
| Bronze medal – third place | 1956 Melbourne | Coxed four |
European Rowing Championships
| Bronze medal – third place | 1955 Ghent | Coxless four |
| Gold medal – first place | 1956 Bled | Coxed four |

Kauko Antero Hänninen (28 January 1930 – 26 August 2013) was a Finnish rower who competed in the 1956 Summer Olympics, in the 1960 Summer Olympics, in the 1964 Summer Olympics, and in the 1968 Summer Olympics.

He was born in Kinnula.

In 1956 he was a crew member of the Finnish boat which won the bronze medal in the coxed fours event. He was also part of the Finnish boat which was eliminated in the repechage of the coxless four competition.

Four years later he was eliminated with the Finnish boat in the semi-finals of the coxed four event.

At the 1964 Games he was a member of the Finnish boat which was eliminated in the repechage of the coxless four competition.

His last Olympic appearance was in 1968 when he and his partner Pekka Sylvander were eliminated in the repechage of the coxless pair event.

Hänninen moved to Stockholm, Sweden, after his competitive career.
