= Reg Libbis =

Australian rower

Personal information
- Nationality: Australian
- Born: 10 June 1933; Melbourne, Australia
- Died: 25 May 2009 (aged 75); Canberra, Australia

Sport
- Sport: Rowing

Reg Libbis (10 June 1933 – 25 May 2009) was an Australian rower. He competed in the men's coxed four event at the 1956 Summer Olympics.
