= Sylvio de Souza =

Brazilian rower

Personal information
- Nationality: Brazilian
- Born: 1935 (age 89–90)

Sport
- Sport: Rowing

Sylvio de Souza (born 1935) is a Brazilian rower. He competed in the men's coxed four event at the 1956 Summer Olympics.
