= Arcadio Padilla =

Mexican rower (born 1941)

Personal information
- Born: 12 January 1941 (age 84); Mexico City, Mexico

Sport
- Sport: Rowing

Arcadio Padilla (born 12 January 1941) is a Mexican rower. He competed at the 1960 Summer Olympics, the 1968 Summer Olympics and the 1972 Summer Olympics.
