= Terry Davies (rower) =

Australian rower (1933–2022)

Personal information
- Born: 18 October 1933 Calcutta, British India
- Died: 31 July 2022 (aged 88)
- Height: 6 ft 0 in (183 cm)
- Weight: 187 lb (85 kg)

Sport
- Club: Uni of WA Boat Club; MUBC; Banks Rowing Club
Medal record
Men's rowing
Representing Australia
Commonwealth Games
Gold medal – first place	1962 Perth	Men's eight

Terence Rodney Davies (18 October 1933 – 31 July 2022), better known as Terry Davies, was an Australian representative rower who competed at two Olympic Games. He raced at the 1960 Rome Olympics in the Men's coxless pair and the 1964 Tokyo Olympics in the Men's eight. He won a gold medal at the 1962 Perth Commonwealth Games in the Men's eight and represented in the Australian eight at the inaugural 1962 World Rowing Championships.

== Early life and rowing ==
Davies was born in India where his father was a policeman. His family lived in Mumbai during WWII.

Davies commenced his rowing at the University of Western Australia club in Perth in 1951. He raced in the Uni of WA senior eight at the 1953 and 1954 Intervarsity Championships. Davies made his sole state representative appearance for Western Australia in 1954 contesting the King's Cup at the Australian Interstate Regatta.

== Victorian club and state rowing ==
Davies relocated to Melbourne in 1956 and initially joined the MUBC. Early in the 1961 season he moved to the Banks Rowing Club. He won Victorian state championships in 1957 and 1958 in MUBC eights then in 1959 and 1960 in coxed and coxless pairs.

He was selected into the Victorian men's senior eight to contest and win the King's Cup in 1958 and then he rowed in further Victorian King's Cup crews in 1962, 1963, 1964 and 1965. Four of those five crews were victorious including the 1963 and 1964 eights which Davies stroked.

Following his Australian representative success Davies continued to compete for Banks at the senior level until 1968 then becoming a committee-man and club selector. He coached at the school level in Victoria and from the 1980s until 1995 competed at the Masters level. He was made a life member of Banks Rowing Club in 1999 and admitted to the Rowing Victoria Hall of Fame in 2011.

== International representative rowing ==
In 1960 Davies and his MUBC teammate John Hunt were selected to race Australia's coxless pair at the 1960 Tokyo Olympics. They were eliminated in the repechage.

The Banks RC men's senior eight were Victorian champions in 1962 and six of the oarsmen in that crew made up the 1962 Victorian King's Cup eight which was also victorious at the Interstate Regatta. That entire 1962 Victorian King's Cup crew was selected as the Australian eight to contest the 1962 Commonwealth Games. Davies was in the four seat of that boat when they rowed to a gold medal victory at those games in Perth. That same crew was encouraged to represent Australia at the inaugural FISA World Championships, the 1962 World Championships in Lucerne. They financed their trip themselves, made it through to the final and finished in overall fifth place.

For the 1964 Tokyo Olympics the winning Victorian King's Cup eight was again selected in toto. They took a new Sargent & Burton eight with them to the Olympics but quickly saw that its design and technology was way behind the European built Donoratico and Stampfli shells being used by the other nations. With Davies in the stroke seat they raced in a borrowed Donoratico eight for the B final and rowed to an overall eighth place in the Olympic regatta.
