= Ernst Veenemans =

Dutch rower (1940–2017)

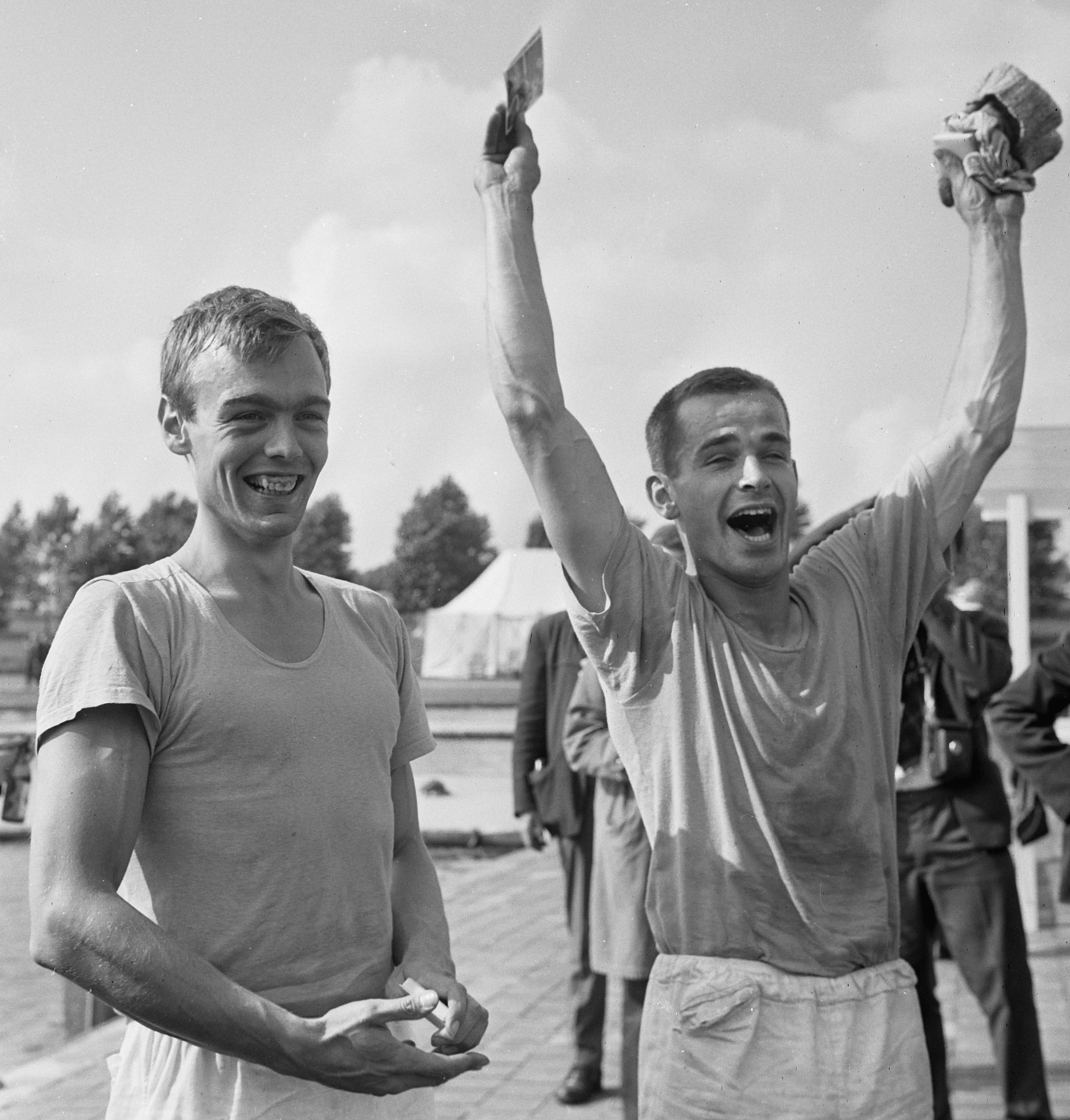
- Ernst Veenemans and Steven Blaisse at the 1964 European Championships

Personal information
- Born: 18 March 1940 (age 86) Haarlem, the Netherlands
- Height: 1.84 m (6 ft 0 in)
- Weight: 72 kg (159 lb)

Sport
- Sport: Rowing
- Club: Nereus, Amsterdam
Medal record
Men's rowing
Representing the Netherlands
Olympic Games
| Silver medal – second place | 1964 Tokyo | Coxless pair |
European Rowing Championships
| Gold medal – first place | 1964 Amsterdam | Coxless pair |
| Bronze medal – third place | 1961 Prague | Coxless pair |

Ernst Willem Veenemans (18 March 1940 – 2 October 2017) was a Dutch rower who achieved his best results in the coxless pairs event alongside Steven Blaisse. Together, they won silver medals at the 1964 Summer Olympics, gold medals at the 1964 European Championships, and bronze medals at the 1961 European Championships.
