= James Wynne (rower) =

American rower

Personal information
- Born: July 24, 1937; Buffalo, New York, United States
- Died: January 23, 2014

Sport
- Sport: Rowing

James Wynne (July 24, 1937 – January 23, 2014) was an American rower. He competed in the men's coxed four event at the 1956 Summer Olympics.

== Biography ==
Wynne was from Grand Island. He engaged in competitive rowing during his high school years at St. Joseph's Collegiate Institute, earning numerous national and Canadian honors. His rowing activities extended into his period at the University of Pennsylvania.

In 1956, Wynne took a leave from his university studies to form part of a five-member team at the West Side Rowing Club for the Melbourne Olympics. He also competed in the 1960 European Games.

In 1963, Wynne married Judy Ryan and relocated to Boston, Massachusetts. There, he worked in human resources for United Parcel Service and observed rowers on the Charles River during weekends. A year later, in 1964, he became the lightweight crew coach at Yale University.

In 1970, Wynne returned to Buffalo, transitioning into hospital administration at Niagara Falls Memorial Medical Center. Here, he played a key role in writing a significant grant application and obtaining federal funds for a new mental health center. He also served on the board of the National Council of Mental Health.

During the 1990s, Wynne resumed his coaching career, initially at Nichols School, and later as assistant coach for women's rowing at the University at Buffalo. He took retirement in 2004.
