= Steven Blaisse =

Dutch rower (1940–2001)

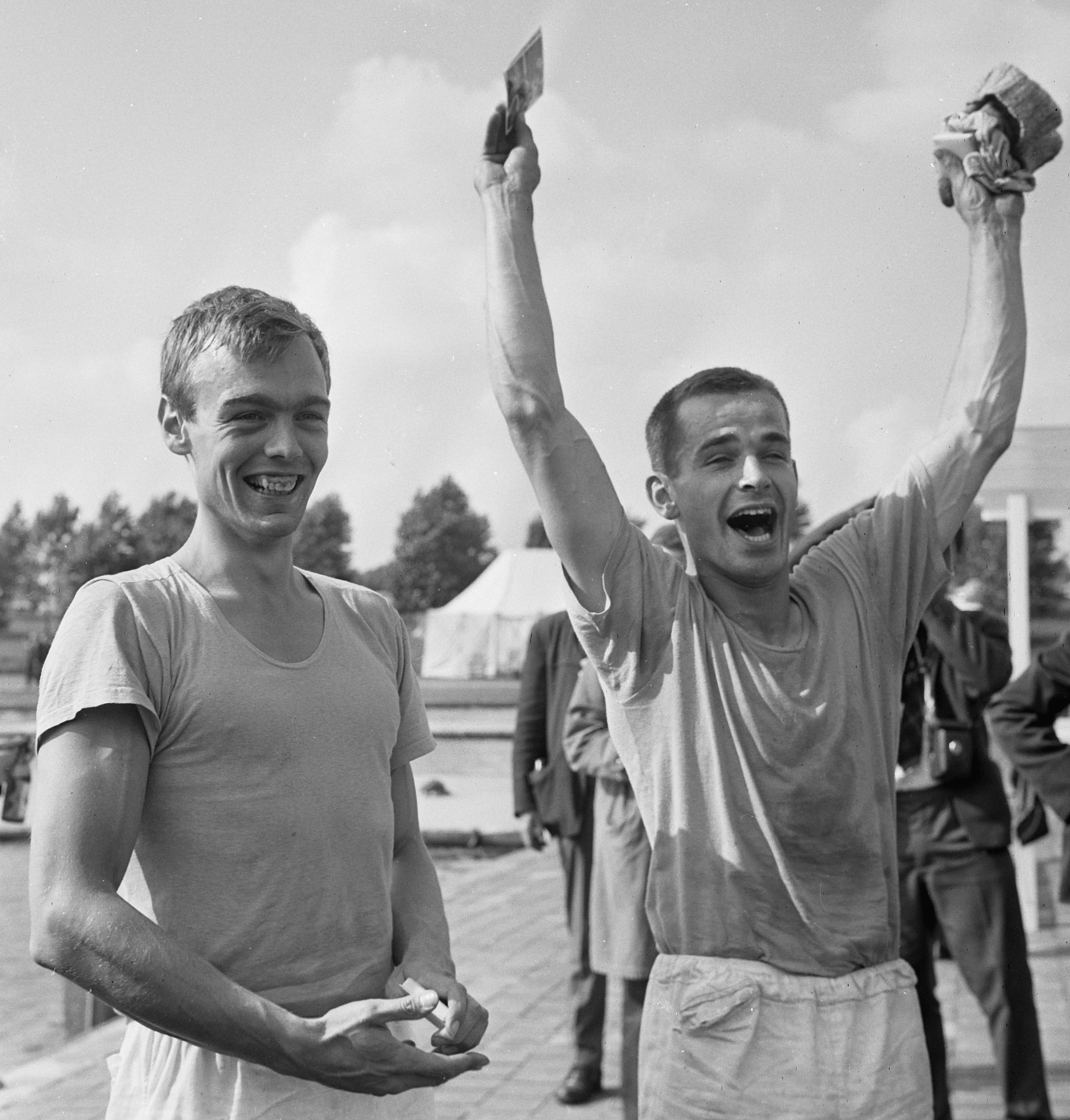
- Ernst Veenemans and Steven Blaisse at the 1964 European Championships

Personal information
- Born: 7 May 1940 Amsterdam, the Netherlands
- Died: 20 April 2001 (aged 60) Brummen, the Netherlands
- Height: 1.80 m (5 ft 11 in)
- Weight: 72 kg (159 lb)

Sport
- Sport: Rowing
- Club: Nereus, Amsterdam
Medal record
Men's rowing
Representing the Netherlands
Olympic Games
Silver medal – second place	1964 Tokyo	Coxless pair
European Rowing Championships
Gold medal – first place	1964 Amsterdam	Coxless pair
Bronze medal – third place	1961 Prague	Coxless pair

Steven Joseph Blaisse (7 May 1940 – 20 April 2001) was a Dutch rower who had his best achievements in the coxless pairs event, together with Ernst Veenemans. Together they won silver medals at the 1964 Summer Olympics, gold medals at the 1964 European Championships and bronze medals at the 1961 European Championships.

Blaisse was a nephew of Olympic skater Ben Blaisse.
