= Wolfgang Hottenrott =

West German rower

Personal information
- Born: 13 June 1940 (age 86) Hanover

Sport
- Sport: Rowing
Medal record
Men's rowing
Representing Germany
Olympic Games
Bronze medal – third place	1964 Tokyo	Coxless pair
Representing West Germany
Olympic Games
Gold medal – first place	1968 Mexico City	Eight
European Rowing Championships
Gold medal – first place	1967 Vichy	Eight
Silver medal – second place	1964 Amsterdam	Coxless pair
Silver medal – second place	1965 Duisburg	Coxless four

Wolfgang Hottenrott (born 13 June 1940) is a competition rower and Olympic champion for West Germany.

He was born in Hanover.

Hottenrott received a bronze medal in the coxless pair at the 1964 Summer Olympics in Tokyo. He won a gold medal in the men's eight at the 1968 Summer Olympics in Mexico City, as a member of the rowing team from West Germany.

At the 1972 Games, he finished fifth with the West Germany boat in the men's eight.
