= Fernando Telles Ribeiro =

Brazilian diver

Personal information
- Full name: Fernando Telles Ribeiro
- Born: April 12, 1938 Jardim Guanabara, Rio de Janeiro, Brazil
- Died: May 1, 2018 (aged 80) São Paulo, Brazil

Sport
- Country: Brazil

Fernando Telles Ribeiro (Note: This name uses Portuguese naming customs: the first or maternal family name is Telles and the second or paternal family name is Ribeiro.) (April 12, 1938 – May 1, 2018) was a male diver from Brazil. He joined the Brazilian national diving squad at the age of 18, and competed at the 1956 Summer Olympics in Melbourne and the 1960 Summer Olympics in Rome. Ribeiro also won the South American Diving Championships four times, and competed in the Pan American Games. He competed in 'Masters' diving competitions, having obtained the title of World Masters' Champion at the Nike Olympic Games in Portland USA in 1998 and Champion of the North American Open Masters in Oxford, USA in 2000.

== Education ==
Telles studied Civil Engineering at the Souza Marques University in Rio de Janeiro.

== Awards ==
In June 2011, Telles was conferred with an honorary Doctorate of the Arts by the University of East London.
