= Toimi Pitkänen =

Finnish rower

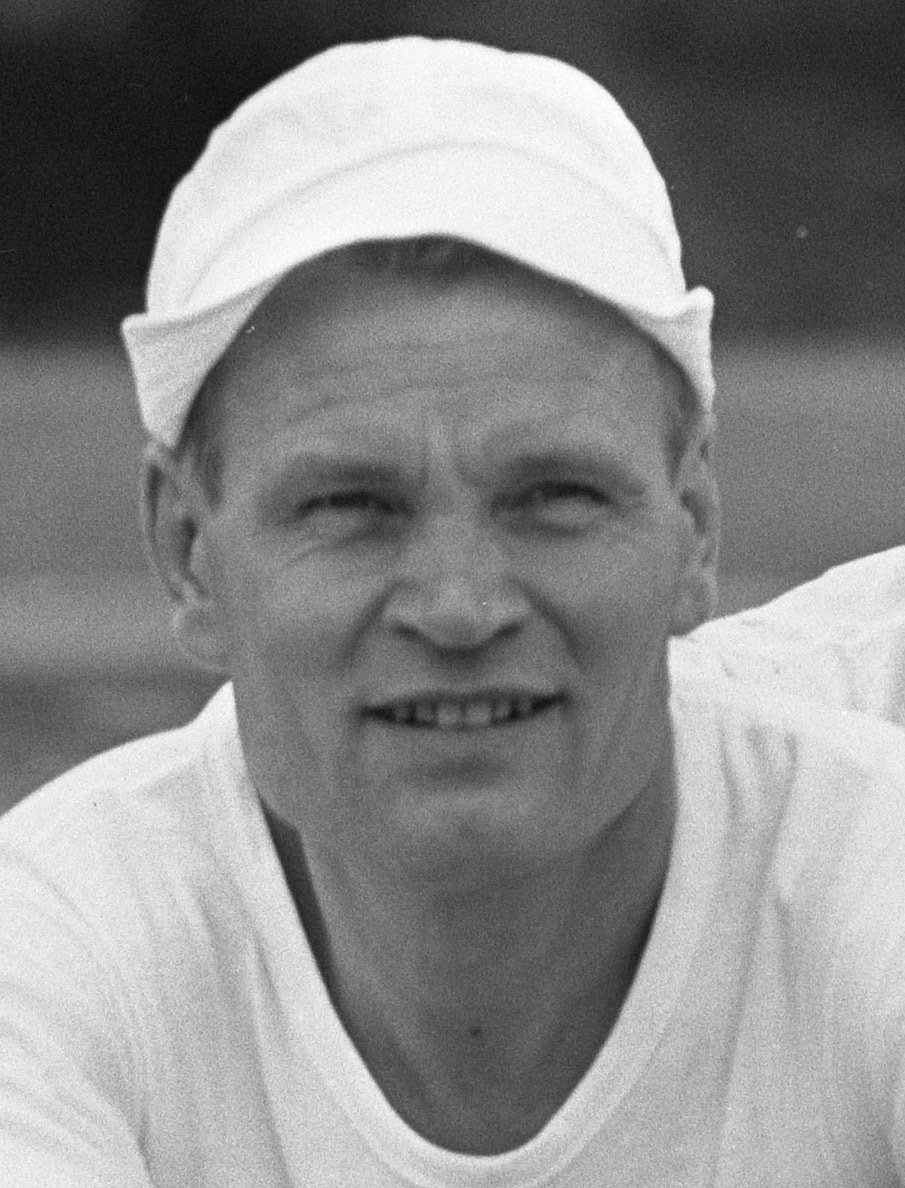

Personal information
- Born: 23 May 1928 Kuhmalahti, Finland
- Died: 17 September 2016 (aged 88)
- Height: 183 cm (6 ft 0 in)
- Weight: 80–85 kg (176–187 lb)

Sport
- Sport: Rowing
Medal record
Representing Finland
Olympic Games
Bronze medal – third place	1956 Melbourne	Coxed four
Bronze medal – third place	1960 Rome	Coxless pair
European Rowing Championships
Silver medal – second place	1955 Ghent	Coxed pair
Gold medal – first place	1956 Bled	Coxed four
Gold medal – first place	1958 Poznań	Coxless pair
Silver medal – second place	1961 Prague	Coxless pair

Toimi Johannes Pitkänen (23 May 1928 – 17 September 2016) was a Finnish rower. He competed in various two-man and four man events at the 1952, 1956, 1960 and 1964 Olympics and won two bronze medals, in 1956 and 1960. Throughout most of his career Pitkänen rowed with Veli Lehtelä. In addition to two Olympic bronze medals, they won two gold and two silver medals at the European championships in 1955–1961, and placed sixth at the 1964 Olympics.
