= José de Carvalho Filho =

Brazilian rower

Personal information
- Born: 15 November 1931; Rio de Janeiro, Brazil
- Died: 16 April 2023 (aged 91); Rio de Janeiro, Brazil

Sport
- Sport: Rowing

José de Carvalho Filho (15 November 1931 – 16 April 2023) was a Brazilian rower. He competed in the men's coxed four event at the 1956 Summer Olympics. José was the father and coach for the Carvalho Brothers, Ricardo de Carvalho and Ronaldo de Carvalho, twice Pan-American gold medalists and three-time Olympians.
