= Edward Masterson (rowing) =

American rower

Personal information
- Born: October 26, 1937 (age 88) Buffalo, New York, United States

Sport
- Sport: Rowing

Edward Masterson (born October 26, 1937) is an American coxswain. He competed in the men's coxed four event at the 1956 Summer Olympics.
