= Raúl Martín (swimmer) =

Cuban swimmer (born 1941)

Personal information
- Born: 3 July 1941 (age 85)

Sport
- Sport: Swimming

Raúl Martín (born 3 July 1941) is a Cuban former swimmer. He competed in two events at the 1956 Summer Olympics.
