= Stewart Farquharson =

British rower (born 1940)

Personal information
- Nationality: British (English)
- Born: 27 April 1940 (age 86) Amersham, England
- Height: 191 cm (6 ft 3 in)
- Weight: 88 kg (194 lb)

Sport
- Sport: Rowing
- Club: University of London Boat Club
Medal record
Rowing
Representing England
British Empire & Commonwealth Games
Gold medal – first place	1962 Perth	coxless pair

Stewart Farquharson (born 27 April 1940) is a British rower who competed at the 1960 Summer Olympics and the 1964 Summer Olympics.

== Biography ==
Farquharson represented Britain in the inaugural 1962 World Rowing Championships with David Lee Nicholson in the coxless pairs, in which they won the B final.

He also represented England and won a gold medal in the coxless pair with David Lee Nicholson, at the 1962 British Empire and Commonwealth Games in Perth, Western Australia. They both rowed for the University of London Boat Club at the time.
