= Enrique Torres (rower) =

Cuban rower

Personal information
- Nationality: Cuban
- Born: 11 February 1938 (age 87)

Sport
- Sport: Rowing

Enrique Torres (born 11 February 1938) is a Cuban rower. He competed in the men's coxed four event at the 1956 Summer Olympics.
