= Ray Laurent =

New Zealand rower

Personal information
- Birth name: Raymond Laurent
- Nationality: New Zealand
- Born: 24 July 1931; Waitara, New Zealand
- Died: 12 May 2010 (aged 78)

Raymond Laurent (24 July 1931 – 12 May 2010) was a New Zealand rower.

Laurent was born in 1931 in Waitara, New Zealand. He was a member of Clifton Rowing Club and represented New Zealand at the 1956 Summer Olympics. The New Zealand Olympic Committee lists as Olympian athlete number 104.

Laurent died on 12 May 2010 in Waitara, New Zealand. He had five children with his wife Nola.
