= Ruy Kopper =

Brazilian rower

Personal information
- Born: 3 July 1930; Rio Grande do Sul, Brazil
- Died: 26 March 2010 (aged 79)

Sport
- Sport: Rowing

Ruy Kopper (3 July 1930 – 26 March 2010) was a Brazilian rower. He competed in the men's coxed four event at the 1956 Summer Olympics.
