= Matti Niemi (rowing) =

Finnish rower

Personal information
- Born: Matti Juhani Niemi; 6 June 1937 (age 89) Viljakkala, Finland

Sport
- Sport: Rowing
Medal record
Men's rowing
Representing Finland
Olympic Games
Bronze medal – third place	1956 Melbourne	Coxed four
European Rowing Championships
Silver medal – second place	1955 Ghent	Coxed pair
Gold medal – first place	1956 Bled	Coxed four

Matti Juhani Niemi (born 6 June 1937) is a Finnish rowing coxswain.

He was born in Viljakkala. At the 1956 Summer Olympics he coxed the Finnish boat that won the bronze medal in the coxed four event.
