= Elo Tostenæs =

Danish rower

Personal information
- Nationality: Danish
- Born: 9 September 1935 (age 89); Rungsted, Denmark

Sport
- Sport: Rowing

Elo Tostenæs (born 9 September 1935) is a Danish rower. He competed at the 1956 Summer Olympics and the 1960 Summer Olympics.
