= Tage Grøndahl =

Danish rower

Personal information
- Nationality: Danish
- Born: 14 October 1931; Sundby, Denmark
- Died: April 2014 (aged 82)

Sport
- Sport: Rowing

Tage Grøndahl (14 October 1931 – April 2014) was a Danish rower. He competed at the 1956 Summer Olympics and the 1960 Summer Olympics.
