= Nicolas Gobet =

Swiss rower

Personal information
- Nationality: Swiss
- Born: 28 December 1938 (age 86); Chavannes, Switzerland

Sport
- Sport: Rowing

Nicolas Gobet (born 28 December 1938) is a Swiss rower. He competed at the 1964 Summer Olympics and the 1968 Summer Olympics.
