= Norimasa Kurosaki =

Japanese rower (born 1943)

Personal information
- Nationality: Japanese
- Born: 2 February 1943 (age 82)

Sport
- Sport: Rowing

Norimasa Kurosaki (黒崎 紀正, Kurosaki Norimasa, born 2 February 1943) is a Japanese rower. He competed in the men's coxless pair event at the 1964 Summer Olympics.
