= Hans Jørgen Boye =

Danish rower

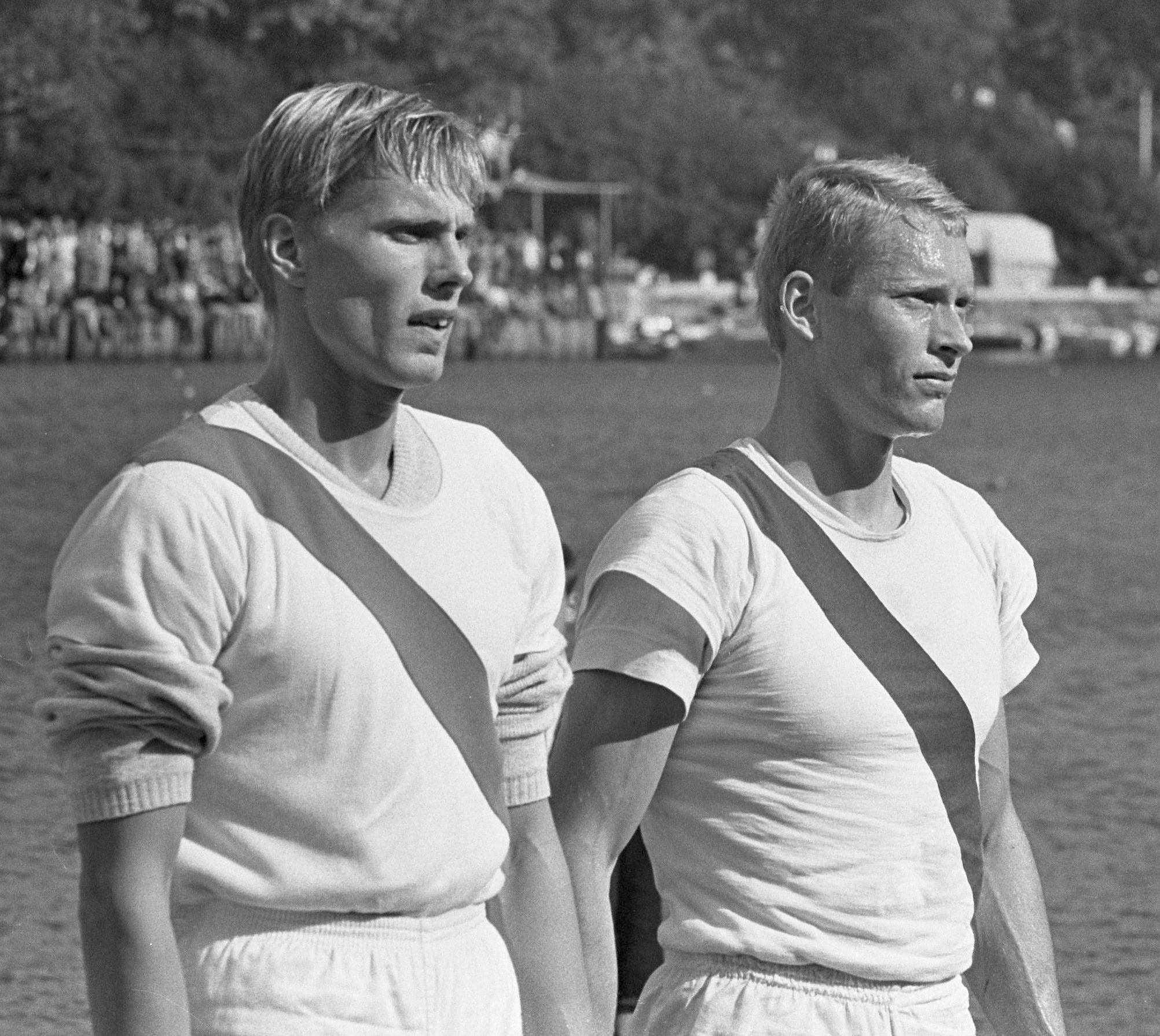
- Hans Jørgen Boye and Peter Christiansen in 1965

Personal information
- Born: 30 June 1942 (age 84) Rudkøbing, Denmark
- Height: 1.88 m (6 ft 2 in)
- Weight: 81 kg (179 lb)

Sport
- Sport: Rowing
- Club: Lyngby Roklub, Lyngby-Taarbæk
Medal record
Representing Denmark
European Rowing Championships
Bronze medal – third place	1964 Amsterdam	Coxless pair
Gold medal – first place	1965 Duisburg	Coxless pair

Hans Jørgen Boye (born 30 June 1942) is a Danish retired rower who had his best achievements in the coxless pairs, partnering with Peter Christiansen. In this event, they won two European medals, in 1964 and 1965, and finished in fifth place at the 1964 Summer Olympics.
