= Coulson =

Coulson may refer to:

== People with the surname ==
- Amanda Coulson (born 1982), English amateur boxer and boxing coach
- Andy Coulson (born 1968), English journalist and political strategist
- Bernie Coulson (born 1965), Canadian actor
- Bob Coulson (1887–1953), American baseball player
- Catherine E. Coulson (1943–2015), American actress
- Charles Coulson (1910–1974), British applied mathematician, theoretical chemist and religious author
- Charlie Coulson (born 1996), English footballer
- Christian Coulson (born 1978), English actor
- Danny Coulson (born 1941), American law enforcement official, Deputy Assistant Director of the FBI
- D'Arcy Coulson (1908–1996), Canadian ice hockey player and hotelier
- Elizabeth Coulson (born 1954), Illinois politician
- Elizabeth Kerr Coulson (1819–1876), English novelist
- Frederick Coulson, English rugby league footballer
- Gustavus Coulson VC (1879–1901), British Army officer
- Ivar "Pop" Coulson, American inventor of the malted milkshake
- John Coulson (chemical engineer) (1910–1990), British professor of chemical engineering
- Sir John Coulson (diplomat) (1909–1997), British ambassador to Sweden and secretary-general of EFTA
- John Hubert Arthur Coulson (1906–1989), English detective fiction writer under pen name John Bonnet
- Joseph Coulson (born 1957), American novelist, playwright and poet
- Josh Coulson (born 1989), English footballer
- Juanita Coulson (born 1933), American science fiction and fantasy writer
- Leslie Coulson (1889–1916), English journalist and poet
- Lindsey Coulson (born 1960), British actress
- Mark Coulson (born 1977), English footballer
- Michael Coulson (barrister) (1927–2002), British barrister, judge and politician
- Michael Coulson (footballer) (born 1988), English footballer
- Sir Peter Coulson (born 1958), Appeal Court judge in England and Wales
- Phil Coulson, fictional character in the Marvel Cinematic Universe
- Robert Coulson (1928–1999), American science fiction writer
- Robert E. Coulson (1912–1986), American lawyer and politician
- Sam Coulson (born 1987), English guitarist
- Timothy Coulson (born 1968), British biologist
- Violet Coulson, second wife of the first Prime Minister of Malaysia
- Walter Coulson (1795–1860), English newspaper editor and barrister
- William Coulson (disambiguation), several people
- Willie Coulson (born 1951), English footballer

== People with the given name ==
- Coulson Kernahan (1858–1943), English novelist
- Coulson Norman Mitchell VC (1889–1978), Canadian military hero

== Places ==
- Coulson, Montana, United States
- Coulson's Hill, Ontario, rural community in Bradford West Gwillimbury, Ontario, Canada
- Coulson, Ontario, rural community in Oro-Medonte, Ontario, Canada
- Coulson, Queensland, Australia

== Companies ==
- Coulson Aviation, Canadian based aviation company

== See also ==
- Colson
- Coulsdon
