= Temporary gentlemen =

British commissioned officers drawn in WWI and WWII from outside the "traditional class"

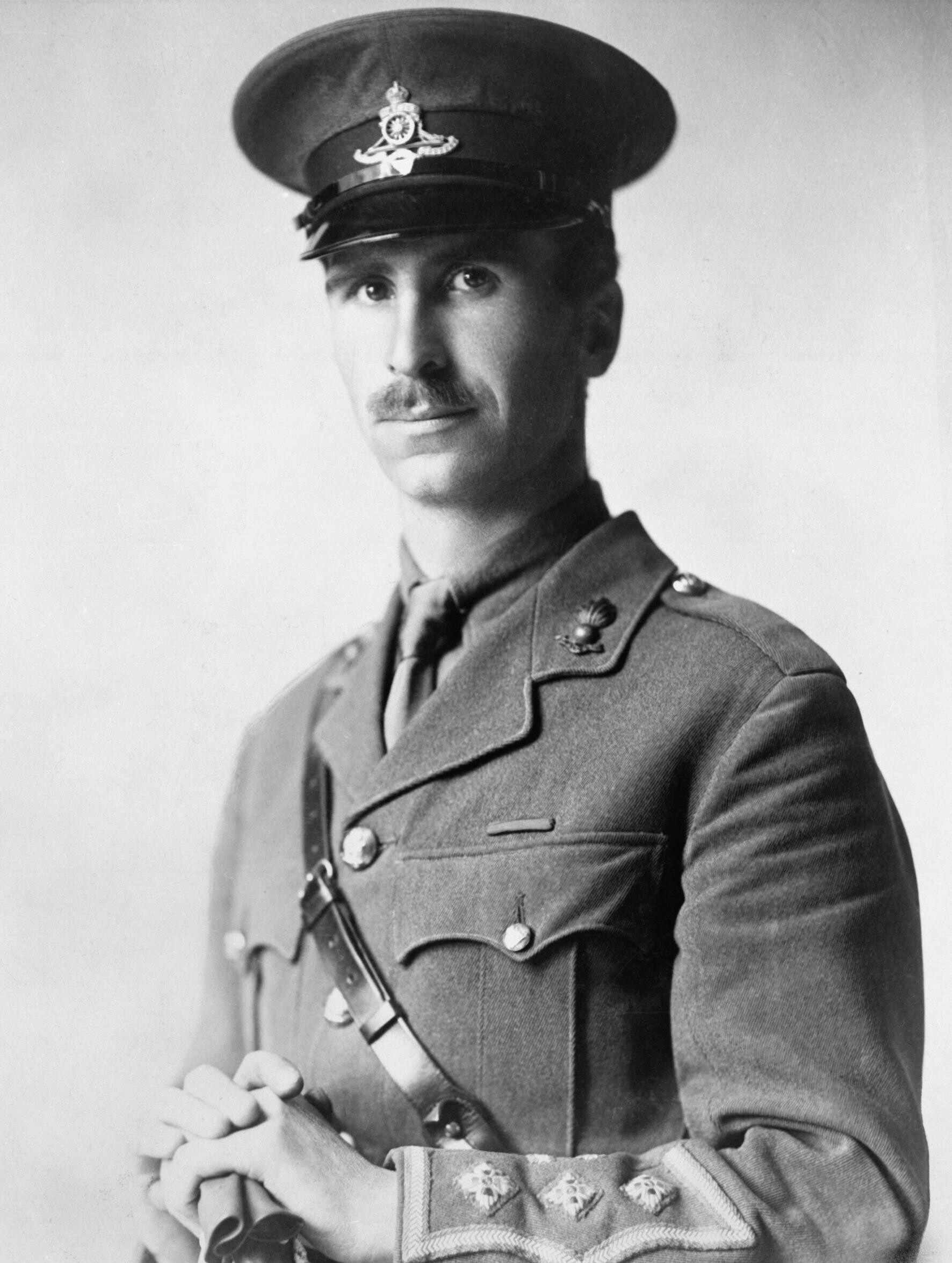
Captain David Nelson who was commissioned from the ranks as a temporary gentleman in 1914, following actions for which he was awarded the Victoria Cross

Temporary gentlemen (sometimes abbreviated to TG) is a colloquial term referring to officers of the British Army who held temporary (or war-duration) commissions, particularly when such men came from outside the traditional "officer class".

Historically the officers of the British Army were drawn from the gentry and upper middle classes and the expensive uniforms and social expectations placed on officers prevented those without a private income from joining. The outbreak of the First World War required a rapid expansion in the size of the army and a corresponding increase in the officer corps. During the war more than 200,000 additional officers were recruited, many on temporary commissions. Many of these were drawn from the lower middle and working classes. They came to be referred to as "temporary gentlemen", a term reflecting the expectation that they would revert to their former social standing after the war. At the end of the war, many were unwilling to return to their former positions on reduced salaries and there were too few managerial positions to provide full employment, resulting in considerable hardship. Some former temporary gentlemen became leading literary figures and temporary gentlemen featured in many inter-war stories, plays and films.

The term was revived in the Second World War, which saw a similar increase in the number of officers holding temporary commissions. A staggered demobilisation at the war's end helped alleviate some of the issues faced by their forebears. The term continued to see use for officers commissioned from those conscripted for National Service, which lasted until 1963. It has also been used as a translation for miliciano, a term used to describe conscript officers in the Portuguese Army of the 1960s and 1970s.

== Background ==
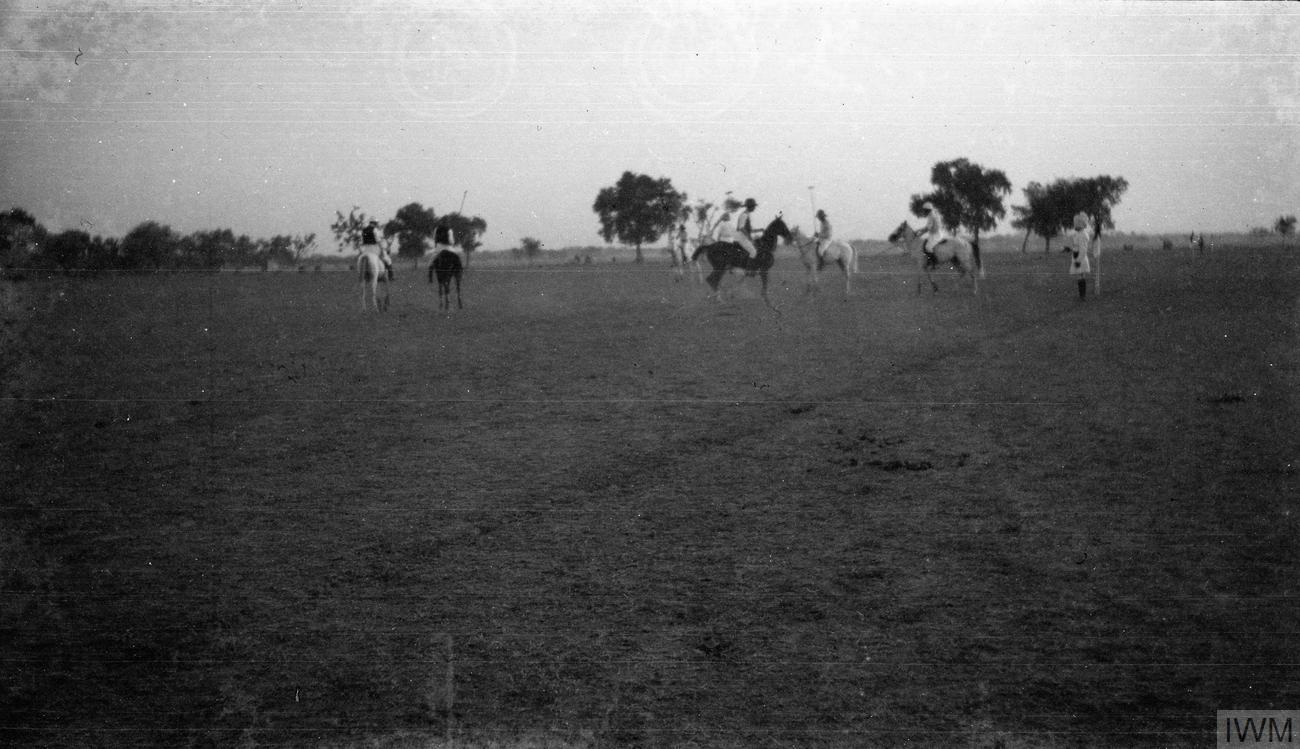
British Army officers playing polo in 1899, while on service during the Second Boer War

Until the Cardwell Reforms of 1871 officers' commissions in the British Army were achieved by purchase, except for those in the artillery or engineers. A substantial sum of money was required to enter the profession and to progress via promotion, when the new commission had to be purchased. The official price ranged in the line infantry from £450 for an ensign to £4,500 for a lieutenant colonel. Cavalry commissions were more costly, and those in the foot guards the most expensive at £1,200 for an ensign and £9,000 for a lieutenant-colonel. (Note: £450 in 1871 is equivalent to £45,829 in 2025; £4,500 is £458,289; £1,200 is £122,210 and £9,000 is £916,578. During this period the unskilled working class might earn around £36 (£3,666) a year with the highest skilled members of that class earning £90 (£9,166). The middle class upwards of £100 (£10,184) per year, the upper middle class more than £500 (£50,921), the gentry upwards of £1,000 (£101,842) and the true upper class in excess of £10,000 (£1,018,420). Private soldiers earned the traditional daily pay of the Queen's shilling (£18 5s per year, equivalent to £1,859 in 2025); the basic rate remained at this level until the start of the First World War.) The purchase was handled by an auction house in London and buyers were often required to pay a supplementary over-regulation or "regimental" price, which varied depending on how popular the regiment was. Sometimes this was many times greater than the official rate; James Brudenell, 7th Earl of Cardigan was reported to have paid £40,000 in 1836 for the lieutenant colonelcy of the 11th Hussars. (Note: £40,000 in 1836 is equivalent to £3,950,235 in 2025) The profession was therefore only open to the wealthy; it was popularly chosen for the younger sons of the gentry and aristocracy, who would not inherit the family estates and who could sell their commissions upon retirement (provided they did not die, were not promoted to general rank or cashiered for poor behaviour). The purchase system also meant that the government did not need to provide a proper salary or pension to officers, saving costs.

Landed families developed traditions of service, successive generations serving in the same regiment. Such men were considered gentlemen, a term encompassing the upper portion of the British class system, inheriting this status from their fathers and holding it for life no matter their behaviour. Due to this close connection, holders of officers' commissions generally came to be regarded as gentlemen by association, as reflected in the phrase "an officer and a gentleman". Many of the traditional "officer class" had attended public schools, and sometimes universities, with Officers' Training Corps (OTC) units and so had been in training for the role from the age of thirteen.

Even after the purchase system was abolished the profession of army officer remained largely the preserve of the landed classes. Officers were required to take part in expensive sports, such as polo, and pay high mess bills. This required a significant private income which precluded the lower classes. Officers also had to purchase their own uniforms and equipment, which cost at least £200 in the infantry and £600–1,000 in the cavalry, and, depending on regimental practice, pay subscriptions to provide coaches, bands, theatre tickets, wine cellars and packs of hunting hounds. (Note: £200 in 1900, for example, is equivalent to £21,254 in 2025; £600 is (£63,762) and £1,000 (£106,270)) In 1900 it was estimated that a junior officer in the 10th Royal Hussars, renowned as the most expensive in the army, required a private income of £500 per year as a bare minimum. (Note: £500 in 1900 is equivalent to £53,135 in 2025.) The Coldstream Guards considered £400 per year as a requirement of entry for new officers and the rest of the Household Brigade £300. (Note: £400 in 1900 is equivalent to £42,508 in 2025 and £300 is £31,881.) In unfashionable regiments (those less popular to new officers) such as the artillery and engineers and some infantry regiments it was considered possible to live on a private income of £60–100. (Note: £60 in 1900 is equivalent to £6,376 in 2025 and £100 is £10,627.) Officers' pay had not increased since 1806 with the most junior officers receiving a salary of £95 16s 3d (£95.81) per year, much below what professionals earned in the private sector. (Note: £95 16s 3d in 1871, for example, is equivalent to £9,757 in 2025. Captains of this era earned £211 a year (£21,489) and lieutenant-colonels £365 (£37,172))

Efforts were made to reform the profession in the early Edwardian era but were stymied by resistance from serving officers and a reluctance by the government to provide funding for subsidies to those without the means to maintain the lifestyle. Only a small number of men from outside the officer class were granted commissions, often those acting in professional roles such as veterinarians or paymasters. In contrast, the other ranks were almost all drawn from the working class and in the ten years from 1903 an average of just 11 officers per year were commissioned from the ranks.

== First World War ==
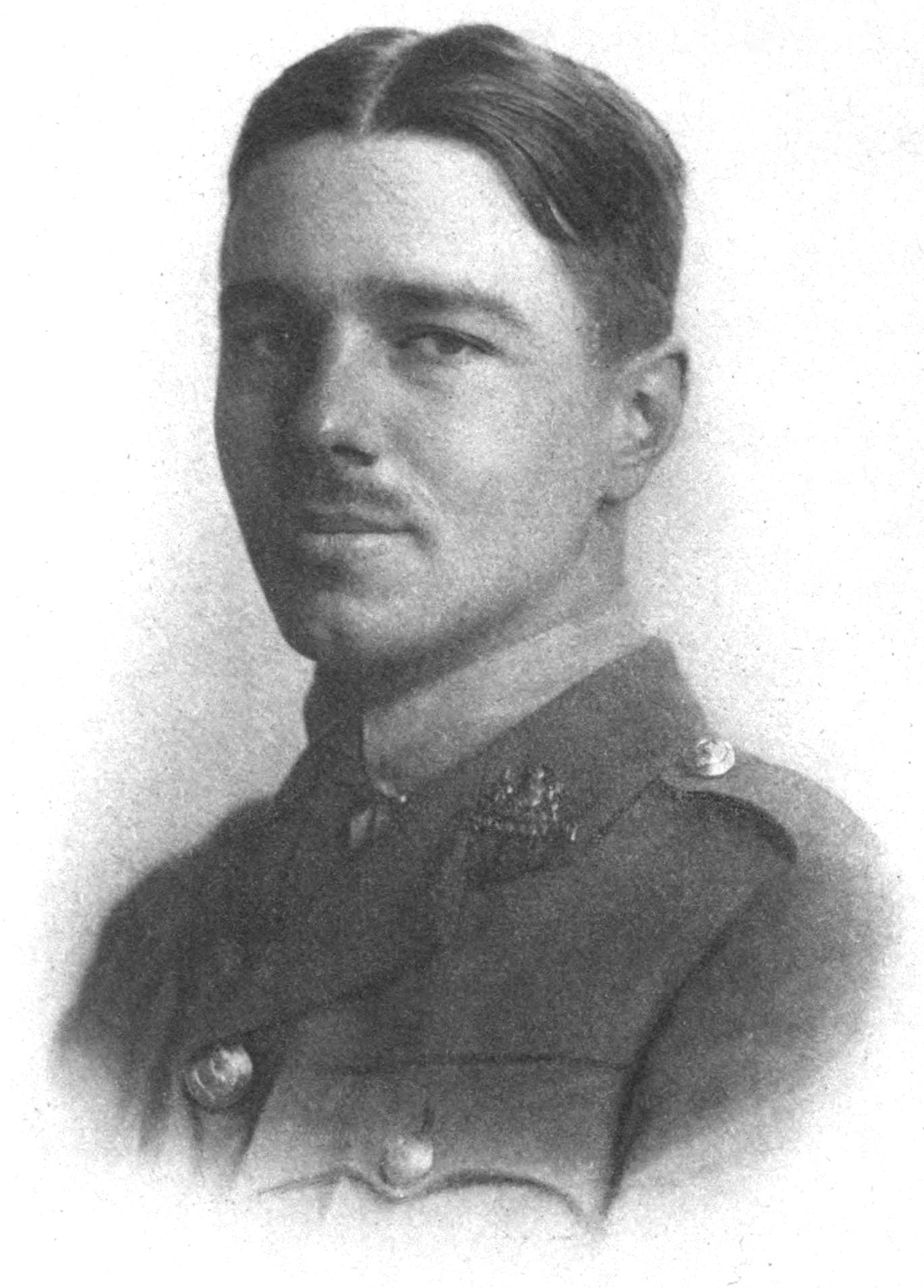
War poet Wilfred Owen who used the term "temporary gentlemen" to refer to officers promoted from the ranks

The term "temporary gentlemen" first came to prominence during the First World War to describe officers who received temporary (or war duration) commissions, often men from outside the traditional officer class. It was sometimes abbreviated to "TG". The term was used by traditional officers to remind temporary officers that they were expected to resume their former positions after the war and was considered offensive by most of those to which it was applied. The use of the term declined once the new officers had proved themselves capable on the battlefield, though some temporary officers adopted the term in an ironic fashion. Some temporary gentlemen used the term themselves to refer to those promoted from the ranks, though these men were also referred to as "ranker officers". The war poet Wilfred Owen, a middle-class Territorial Force officer commissioned in 1916, used this form of the term when he wrote a letter to his mother describing "temporary gentlemen ... glorified NCOs [non-commissioned officers] ... privates and sergeants in masquerade" and how he would "rather be among honest privates than these snobs".

Sometimes the opposite situation occurred when men who would seemingly have no problems fulfilling the requirements to hold a commission in peacetime chose instead to serve in the ranks during the war. This included David Lindsay, 27th Earl of Crawford who, at the age of 45, served as a lance corporal, and Leslie Coulson, assistant editor of The Morning Post, who refused a commission to "do the thing fairly [and] take [his] place in the ranks". Coulson died as a sergeant in the London Regiment at the Battle of Le Transloy in 1916.

=== Outbreak of war ===
At the outbreak of the war there were 10,800 officers in the British Army with another 2,500 in the Special Reserve and 10,700 in the Territorial Force, which was 2,000 below the British Army's theoretical full strength. During the next four years more than 200,000 men became officers, mostly on temporary commissions—with the intention being that they would return to civilian life after the war was over. (Note: Sources vary in the number of commissions granted during the war, Turner (1988, p. 114) gives 229,316, the National Archives website states 235,000 and Holmes (2011, p. 183) states 265,397. There is uncertainty over the number of temporary commissions granted, but sources agree that the majority of commissions granted during the war were temporary commissions. Turner (1988, p. 114) states that only 16,544 permanent commissions were granted and Beckett, Bowman & Connelly (2017, p. 48) gives figures of 30,376 Special Reserve and 60,044 Territorial Force commissions; the remainder would have been temporary commissions.)

Some men were commissioned directly from the ranks in the early stages of the war, mainly senior NCOs and warrant officers from the regular army. On 1 October 1914 an unprecedented 187 men were commissioned in this manner, the largest single influx of working-class officers the army had ever received. By the end of 1914 almost 1,000 men from the ranks had received officers' commissions and by the end of the war in 1918 some 10,000 had been commissioned.

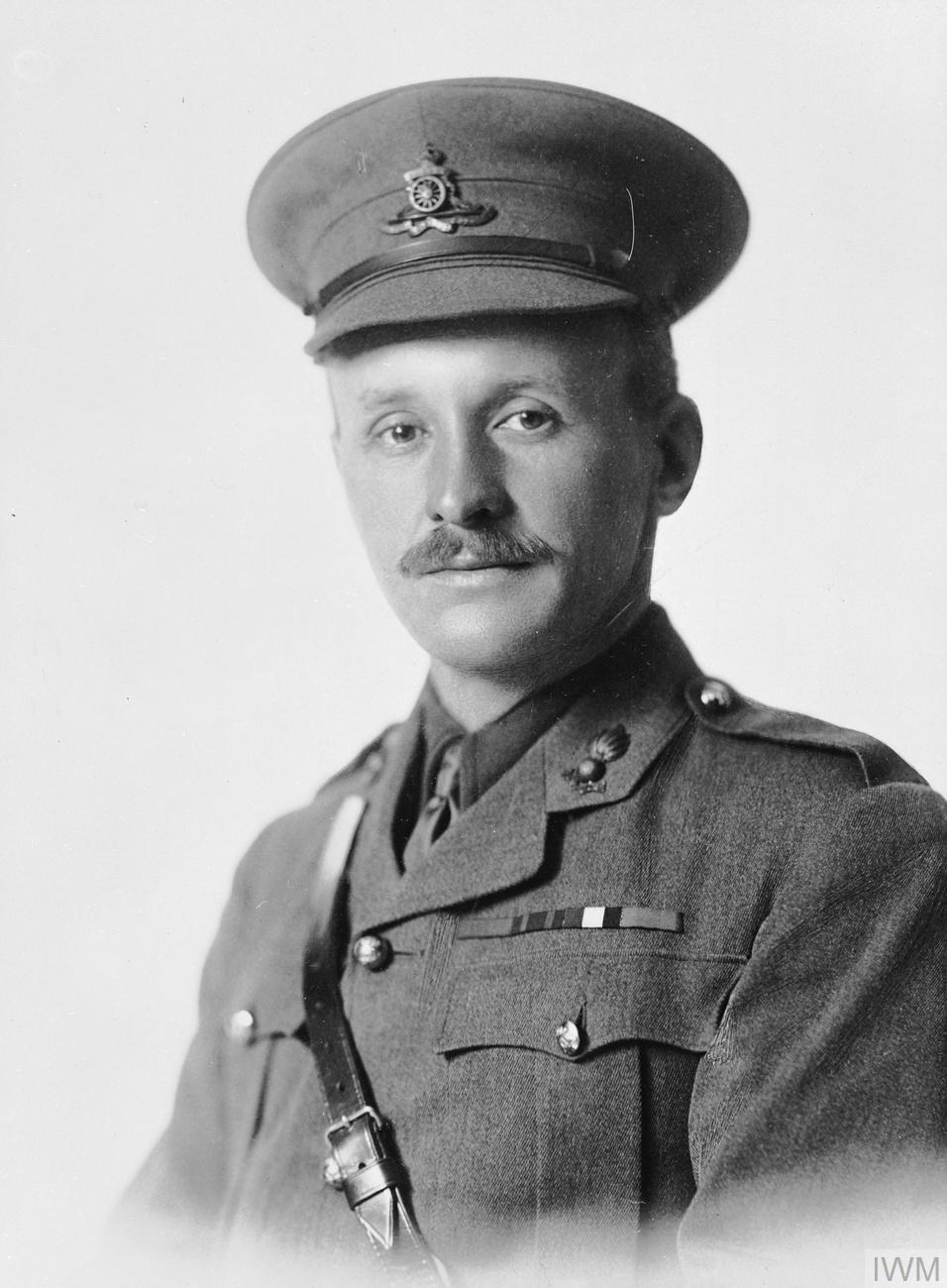
George Thomas Dorrell was a pre-war non-commissioned officer who received a commission in 1914.

Men commissioned from the ranks at this stage of the war were discharged from the regular army and appointed to temporary commissions, a process that caused problems upon demobilisation when many wished to continue their service in the army. Those who received commissions in this manner included the Royal Artillery's Sergeant Major George Thomas Dorrell and Sergeant David Nelson, who both won Victoria Crosses for gallantry during the action at Néry on 1 September 1914.

Some NCOs who received temporary commissions found themselves in financial difficulty as they lost their entitlement to extra pay while on active service. Financial concerns led to some potential officers refusing to accept commissions, despite pressure from their superiors. The issue was partly remedied later in the war with the introduction of grants to all officers below the rank of major and allowances paid for officer's children. By 1916 all subalterns received 7s 6d (£0.38) a day in pay, an initial £50 kit allowance, a 2s (£0.10) daily lodging allowance, 2s 6d (£0.13) daily field service allowance and free mess rations and travel. (Note: 7s 6d in 1916 is equivalent to £29 in 2025; £50 is £3,760; 2s is £15 and 2s 6d is £10.) A newly commissioned officer on active service could therefore earn upwards of £210 per year, on top of which some civilian employers also continued to pay their former employees half wages. (Note: £210 in 1916 is equivalent to £15,793 in 2025) As such, during the later part of the war temporary gentlemen on active service had few financial concerns.

Former NCOs sometimes found the transition from holding authority over up to 1,000 men (as a regimental sergeant major, for example) to the more humble commands of a second lieutenant difficult. They would also be removed from their units and posted elsewhere as the army authorities considered that officers should not be too familiar with their men. Some of those commissioned from the ranks were subject to hostility from their men for knowing too much of army life and being difficult to fool compared to traditional officers. General Richard O'Connor felt that the system of promoting from the ranks deprived the regiments of experienced and reliable NCOs. Not all officers promoted from the ranks were from the lower social classes; many had attended public schools and had chosen to serve in the ranks or had missed out on commissions at the start of the war.

The British Army expanded rapidly during the early months of the war; almost 1.2 million recruits joined the British Army by the end of 1914, many entering the all-volunteer Kitchener's Army. Lord Kitchener, Secretary of State for War, turned first to volunteers from retired officers to fill the new vacancies before selecting men from among the recruits. Most new commissions in this period went to members of the traditional officer class with a few former tradesmen, clerks and manufacturing workers, particularly in the pals battalions. There was considerable favouritism shown towards those who had attended public or grammar schools with OTC units, and among those there was a bias towards better-known schools. There may have been no intention to select officers on the basis of class, merely a preference for prior military service such as that provided by the OTC; with the majority of OTCs being based at the major public schools this led to a bias towards those who had studied there. Possibly because of this selection, the officers of Kitchener's Army were, as a cohort, amongst the best educated to serve with the British Army during the war. The rapid commissioning of officers for Kitchener's Army caused some difficulties. There were cases of men holding commissions simultaneously with the army and the Royal Navy, having applied to both, and of men who had first enlisted as private soldiers being sought for desertion following their commissioning.

Future prime minister Harold Macmillan joined the army in November 1914 as a second lieutenant in the 19th Battalion of the King's Royal Rifle Corps. Macmillan came from a family of good social standing and he was soon able to secure a transfer to the more prestigious Grenadier Guards through the intervention of his mother. Though he himself was a temporary officer, Macmillan used the term "temporary gentlemen" to refer to others; he later reused the term in his political career to refer to Lord Hailsham, whom he considered unfit to succeed him as leader of the Conservative Party.

=== Rapid rise in temporary commissions ===
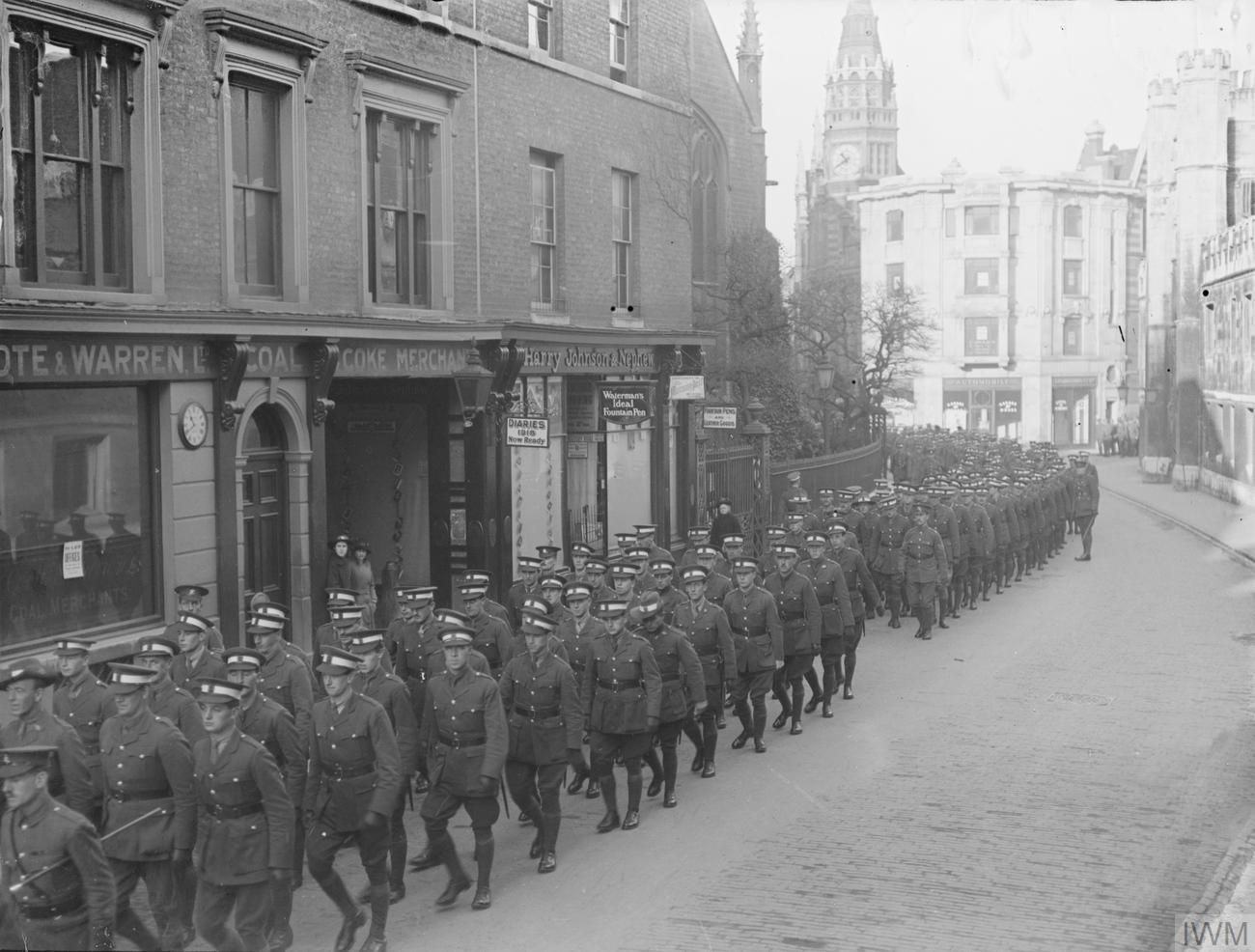
Many temporary gentlemen received their initial training at officer cadet battalions such as this one shown marching through Cambridge

The majority of the British Expeditionary Force's pre-war officers became casualties within the first year of the war. With the academies at Sandhurst and Woolwich incapable of providing sufficient replacements via the traditional route (with permanent regular commissions) the army was forced to change its recruitment process; it introduced the widescale issuing of temporary or "war duration" commissions on a more standardised merit-based approach. More than 80,000 temporary commissions were issued by February 1916 when the officer training system was reformed, following the introduction of conscription in January. In the new system all potential officers were required to attend officer cadet battalions led by instructors with experience of the war. Eventually 23 officer cadet battalions were established and by the war's end they had produced 107,929 temporary officers.

The rapid increase in temporary commissions and the creation of officer cadet battalions allowed the widening of the recruitment pool to those who would not have been considered "officer material" before the war, including those from the lower middle class and even some from the working class. Many of the early temporary officers were former clerks, a lower-middle-class career which nonetheless required at least a passable education, and whose profession had a noted tendency towards social mobility. Ralph Hale Mottram, a pre-war bank clerk, described the experience of receiving an army commission in 1915: "never having wanted, or thought myself competent, to become even the most junior officer of a military formation, I had volunteered, first in the ranks and then, when I was told to do so, for a commission in the new great national army that won the war". Many of the temporary officers of this period lacked any prior military experience, not having attended a school with a cadet corps.

Temporary commissions to those outside the traditional officer class challenged the concept of officers being considered gentlemen. It came to be considered that the new officers should be classed as gentlemen only by virtue of the commission they held, which was on a temporary basis only. Upon the end of the war the expectation was that the temporary officers would be demobilised and return to their pre-war lives, ceasing to be considered gentlemen. Despite the rapid social change caused by the war the British Army maintained the ethos of 1914 throughout and expected all its officers to maintain a "gentlemanly" bearing and appearance. Some of the more fashionable regiments, such as the foot guards, continued to discriminate, attempting to maintain their social exclusivity by preferring Sandhurst graduates over those with temporary commissions.

=== Requirement for non-commissioned service ===
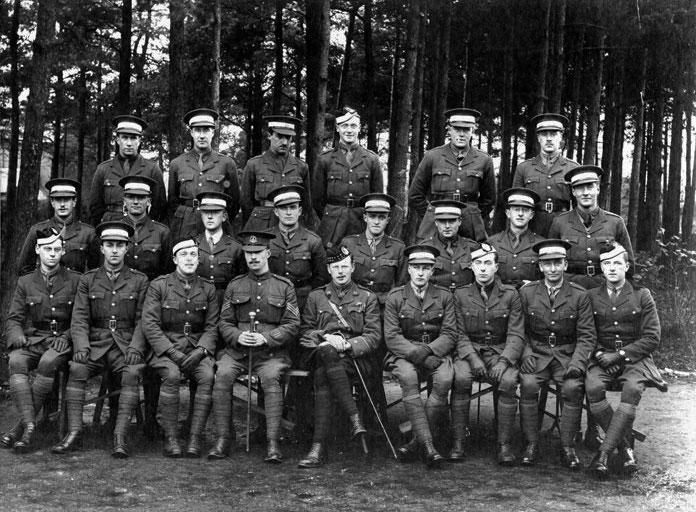
Men of the 20th Officer Cadet Battalion, shown in December 1917 by which time all would have been expected to have two years service prior to commissioning

In February 1916 the War Office ruled that temporary commissions would only be granted to those men who had served for two years in the ranks or the OTC. This policy led to an immediate increase in the number of temporary gentlemen drawn from the working class. By 1917 each division was required to provide 50 men per month who were deemed suitable officer candidates, as recommended by their commanding officers. The theory behind the scheme was summed up by a lieutenant colonel of the Lancashire Fusiliers in 1918: "We don't want men of means as officers these days; we want men of experience ... —men who know this job and can lead others the way to go." Some commanders saw the new policy as an opportunity to remove undesirable or unsuitable men from their units. It was also found that many NCOs were unwilling to leave their comrades to attend officer training, after which they would be posted to an unknown unit. Despite this, by the end of the war more than half of all British officers had served in the ranks or in OTCs prior to commissioning.

=== Reception and integration into the army ===
By 1918 there were many men holding commissions who would never have been granted a Territorial Force commission, let alone one in the regular army, in 1914. It has been estimated that only a quarter of all officers who served during the war were drawn from the traditional officer class. The working class accounted for between 15 and 20 per cent of the officer corps and the remainder were drawn from the lower-middle class. Of the 144,000 officers demobilised at the war's end (the majority of whom held temporary commissions) it was found that 60 per cent came from clerical, commercial, educational or professional lines of work. Indeed, almost every industry of the country had contributed at least one officer: 7,739 came from the railways, 1,016 were coal miners, 638 were fishermen, 266 were warehousemen or porters, 213 were bootmakers, 168 were navvies, 148 were carters and 20 were slate miners. Even when considering the select few who had been awarded regular army commissions there was a notable shift towards the middle and lower-middle classes.

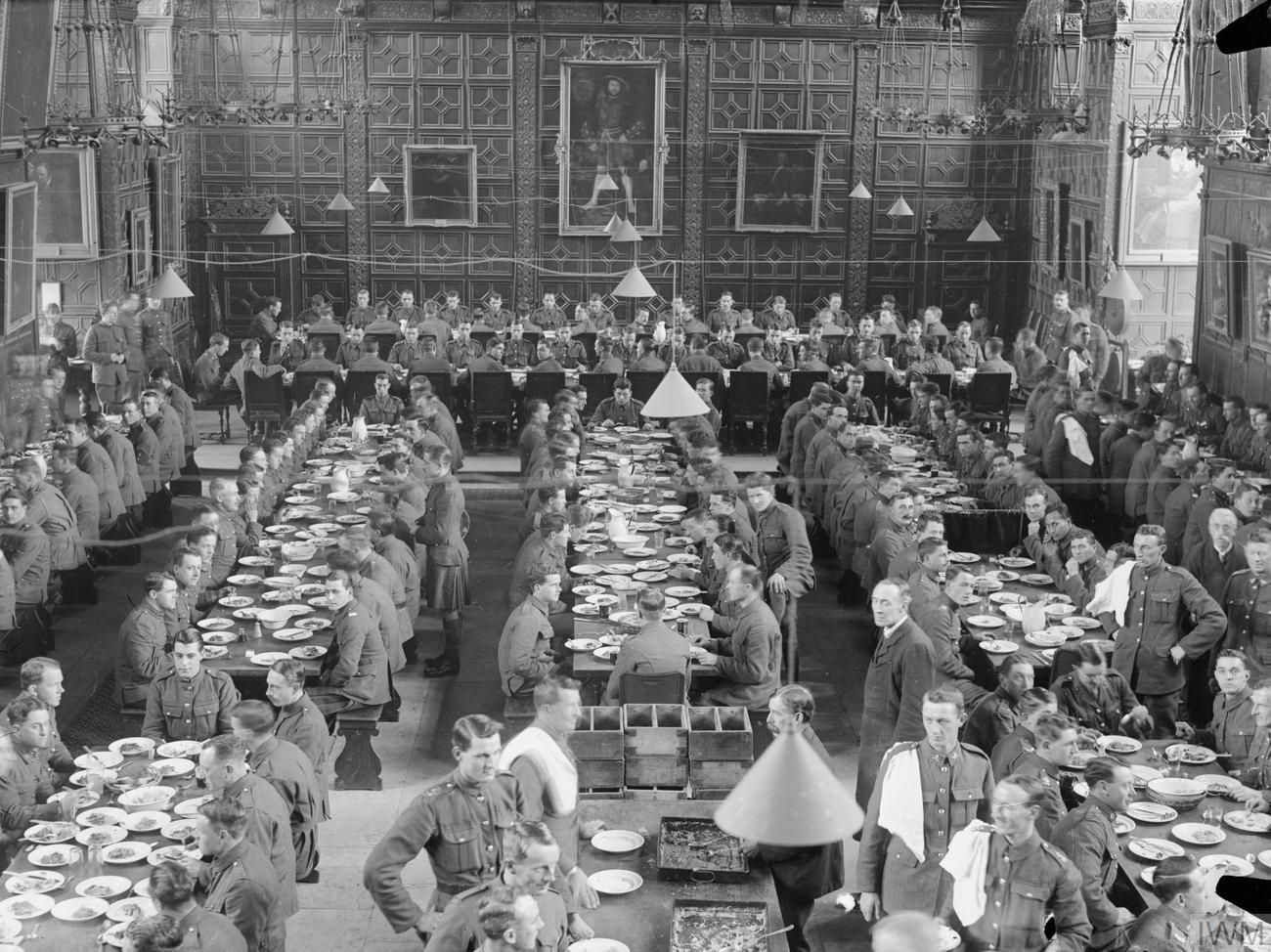
The 5th Officer Cadet Battalion at dinner in the upper-class environs of Trinity College, Cambridge

The change did not go unnoticed; British commander Douglas Haig's final dispatch of 10 April 1919 made note of several temporary gentlemen who had risen from humble origins including clerks and policemen, two miners, a taxicab driver, an undercook, a railway signalman, a market gardener, a blacksmith's son, an iron moulder, an instructor in tailoring, an assistant gas engineer and a grocer's assistant. Future prime minister Clement Attlee, who served in the war as a temporary officer and reached the rank of major, stated that "I had a Lancashire miner who had been in Gallipoli with me and a lad who had been an errand-boy, but they were very good material. The latter was quite a rough lad. He was sent on an officers' course and, when asked to write a technical appreciation, said to the instructor 'Dost think Ah'm Douggy 'aig, lad?'" ("Do you think I'm Douglas Haig, lad?") Attlee was regarded by one pre-war officer as "a charming fellow … but a damned, democratic, Socialistic, tub-thumping rascal". Duff Cooper, a future politician and diplomat, noted in July 1917 that the officer cadet battalion of the Household Brigade, in which he served, contained a shoemaker, a Yorkshire window dresser and a cockney bank clerk.

To instruct temporary gentlemen in the behaviour expected of officers, the War Office issued several pamphlets and posted regular army officers into new battalions. Temporary gentlemen were encouraged to not feign interest in the traditional officers' pursuits of horse riding and polo or to imitate the manners and accents of the regular officers. Men who did so were held in low regard by both the regulars and their fellow temporary gentlemen. Temporary gentlemen were also advised not to smoke a pipe in public, drink too much or become either a "book worm or a bar loafer". Those temporary officers with a similar social and educational background to the regulars generally found it easier to gain acceptance.

Many officer cadet battalions were based in more upper-class environments such as the colleges at Oxford and Cambridge Universities, to introduce the temporary officers to such a life, and classes included lectures on army etiquette and table manners. Temporary gentlemen drawn from the middle classes, coming from households that did not have servants, were often surprised to be allocated a batman (an army orderly). Some of the temporary gentlemen were unable to adapt to service life: the introduction of temporary commissions saw a large increase in the number of officers court-martialled for indecency or scandalous conduct (an offence typically used to prosecute sexual misdemeanours or dishonouring cheques). One officer was court-martialled and sentenced to be cashiered for refusing to grow the moustache that regulations stipulated for officers, though this action led the Adjutant-General, Nevil Macready, to rescind the requirement.

=== Analysis ===
On the whole, the temporary gentlemen seem to have been accepted by the regular army officers and performed adequately on the battlefield. Some temporary gentlemen experienced difficulties when posted to British East Africa, as the askaris there viewed them as "low-class masters" inferior to regular army officers. Temporary gentlemen lacked the military experience of their colleagues with pre-war service, but in some circumstances, this was regarded as an advantage. A pre-war regular, Sergeant John Francis Lucy of the Royal Irish Rifles, noted that "the New Army leaders, a large number of whom were practical businessmen with no time for obsolete customs ... [showed] an unexpected flair for fighting, brought critical and well-trained minds to bear on every aspect of the war, and won not our respect, but our admiration". E. S. Turner, in his 1956 history of the British officer, considered that the temporary gentlemen were good leaders of New Army men, particularly as they often lacked the benefit of experienced NCOs which pre-war officers had relied on.

It was rare for temporary gentlemen to be appointed as commanding officers. During the war as a whole, only 8 per cent of those appointed to command infantry battalions (as lieutenant-colonels) had no pre-war service; though, by September 1918, 22 per cent of infantry battalions were commanded by such men. The command of regular army battalions was almost exclusively given to officers with permanent commissions. There was consensus amongst those responsible for senior appointments that temporary gentlemen were not suitable candidates for general officer positions. Almost all British First World War generals were drawn from the ranks of the pre-war regular army, together with a few Territorial Force officers.

At the end of the war, Haig noted that some temporary gentlemen had reached senior rank, including a schoolmaster, a lawyer and a taxicab driver who had commanded brigades and a former editor who had commanded a division. The schoolmaster was Brigadier-General George Gater, of whom regular army officer Hanway Robert Cumming said, "[he] was a product of the New Army; he had never seen or thought of soldiering before the war ... He was a first-class brigade commander, very able and quick; indeed it was difficult to imagine him in any other capacity". He returned to civilian life after the war, becoming a civil servant in Nottinghamshire. For much of the war, the Chief of the Imperial General Staff (the professional head of the British Army) was General Sir William Robertson, the son of a tailor who had been promoted from the ranks in 1888.

The situation was different in other Imperial forces. For example, the 1st Australian Division, which was raised in 1914 as the infantry component of the First Australian Imperial Force, drew the majority of its officers from reservists or men promoted from the ranks. Of the 631 officers of the division at its formation, 99 had served as officers in the pre-war Australian or British armies, 444 were current or former officers from the Australian or other Imperial reserve forces. Only 24 officers had never served before and could be considered similar to the temporary gentlemen of the British Army. As the war progressed, nearly all Australian officers were drawn from the ranks and continued to serve with their original units.

== Inter-war period ==
=== Demobilisation ===
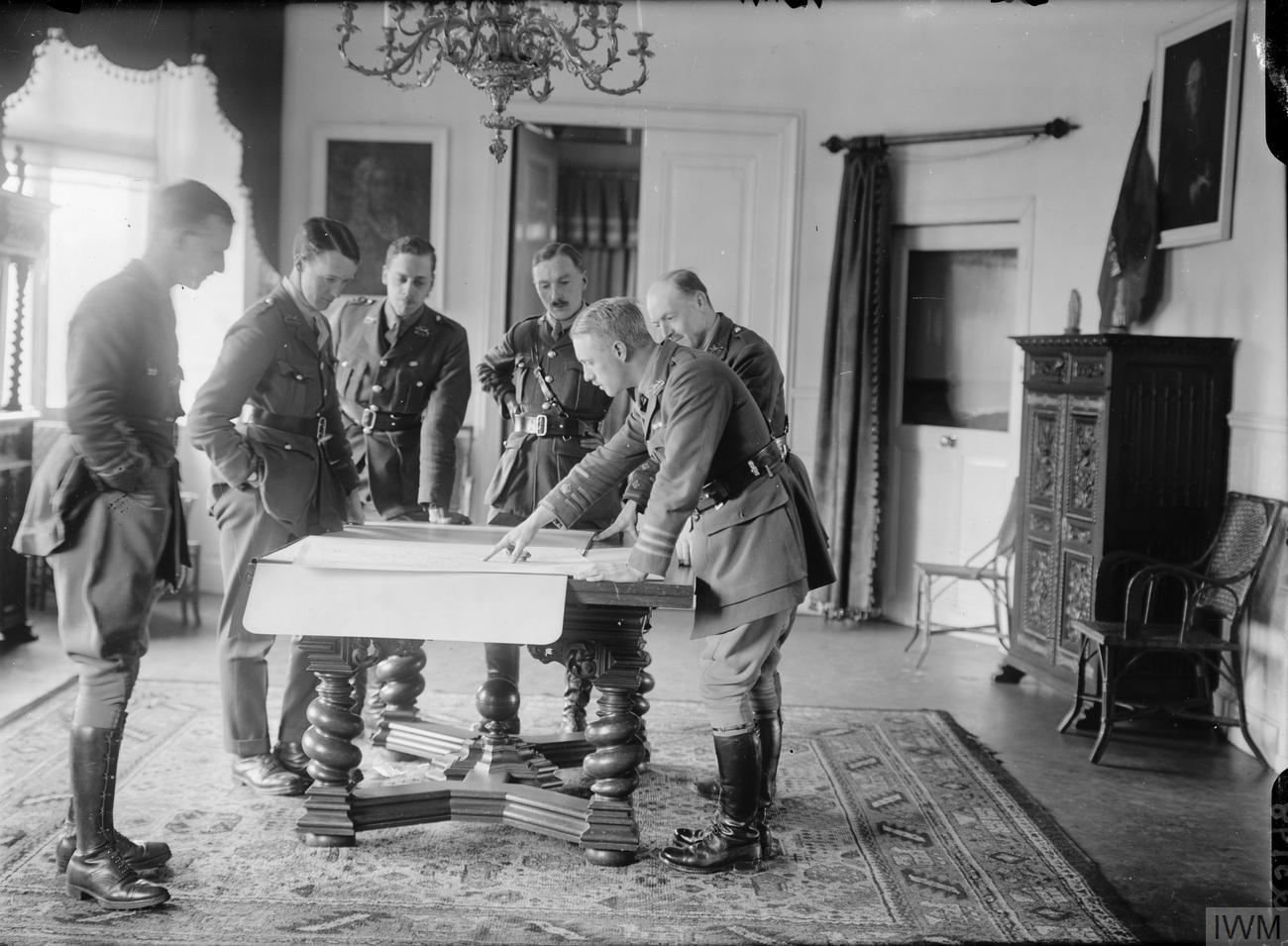
Officers of the 8th Battalion, King's Own (Royal Lancaster Regiment), discuss plans for demobilisation in April 1919

Temporary gentlemen were demobilised quickly at the war's end; by the end of 1920 over 200,000 officers had been demobilised, including most of the officers holding temporary commissions. Although the army could convert temporary commissions into permanent commissions, this was rare and happened only on 1,109 occasions. The number of temporary gentlemen incorporated into the regular army was dwarfed by the 7,113 men commissioned via the conventional route through the military colleges.

There were challenges in reintegrating the temporary gentlemen into civilian life, particularly those who came from modest means. American sociologist Willard Waller noted in 1944 that "particularly distressing is the situation of the 'ranker', the 'temporary gentleman', when he returns to civilian life. Many of these, of course, return to a higher status in civilian life than they occupied in the army, but many others never again rise as high, hold as much power, or touch as much money as during the war". Many temporary officers, even those with no secondary education, expected to retain their position as gentlemen after the war. A British employment official reported that many sought jobs with "a status comparable to that which they held as officers; by which is meant, some status implying supervision and control over other men". In April 1918, the Ministry of Labour established an appointments department to seek positions for former officers in the civil service and in the private sector. This department was headed by the controller-general of civil demobilisation and resettlement, Sir Stephenson Kent and, from December 1918, reported to Sir Eric Geddes, the cabinet minister responsible for demobilisation and industrial reconstruction. In January 1919, Kent asked Geddes whether he should be looking to place men in civilian positions commensurate with their pre-war social standing or their wartime rank. Geddes suggested he should seek to provide them with employment in line with the more favourable of the two positions, despite objections from the boards of education and agriculture and Kent's own deputy, Brigadier-General Arthur Asquith. Geddes' policy was opposed by the Treasury over potential claims from other ranks for similar treatment and the fact that the individual's level of education was being disregarded. From March, the decision was rescinded and former officers would be entitled to post-war appointments based on their civilian standing alone (for example, their social rank and education).

An appointments department official later noted that "the association between officer and gentleman had come about because gentlemen traditionally chose to become officers, not because being an officer carried the assurance of gentlemanly status. During the war hopes were raised which could only be fulfilled if the 'democracy' achieved in the officers' mess corresponded to the 'democracy' of postwar society. As it turned out, even the temporary officers who had always seen themselves as 'gentlemen' could have a hard time maintaining their position after the war".

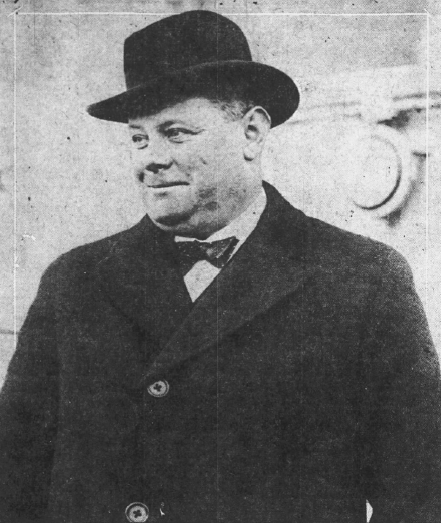
Sir Eric Geddes, the minister responsible for post-war demobilisation

The government attempted to assist demobilised officers to find new work by providing training in the fields of agriculture and business and by establishing several related grants and allowances. There was much displeasure amongst the former officers, particularly those who had to take large steps back down the social ladder. The Service Man journal recorded cases of former brigadier-generals acting as cooks in the Royal Irish Constabulary, colonels working as grocers and majors as salesmen. Other officers are known to have become storemen, railway porters and cab drivers, and at least one became an organ grinder.

The Territorial Force intelligence officer and author Hugh Pollard wrote in February 1919 that "everyone recognises that the warehouse clerk who has shown himself fit to be a colonel should not have to go back to his old job, because it is such obvious waste of a man of higher capacity ... the nation must realise what magnificent material it has available in the non-regular officers of the Army, the Air Force, and the Navy, and it must wake up to the absolute necessity of making the best possible use of them when they revert to civil employment". When Ralph Mottram returned to his position as a junior bank clerk, he stated that he found "the longed-for and dearly bought Peace was a profound disappointment".

Many temporary officers found their financial situation worsened by demobilisation. Whereas a typical junior officer's salary might have totalled £300 per annum, many civilian jobs paid much less. (Note: £300 in 1919 is equivalent to £13,393 in 2025) The Minister of Labour Sir Robert Horne noted that half of the vacancies the appointments department offered to demobilised officers paid a salary of less than £250 per year and many were less than £150. (Note: £250 in 1919 is equivalent to £11,161 in 2025 and £150 is £6,696) The government recognised this and issued advice to those being demobilised that "most young officers have been drawing a considerably higher rate of pay than the ordinary university graduate could ever hope to earn in the first few years after taking his degree" and they should not expect their pay to be matched by civilian employers. Blame was attached to the civilian bosses who, in some cases, offered men employment based on 1914 rates of pay. British Army policy did not help; officers resident abroad had to pay for their own transport, unlike men in the other ranks who were repatriated free of charge, and temporary officers were not entitled to pension payments. Writer and ex-officer Richard Aldington claimed that by early 1919 thousands of demobilised officers were destitute and sleeping rough in Hyde Park, and such was the hardship that around 50 charities and organisations were set up to assist former officers.

The problem reached a climax in early 1920, when the peak of the demobilisation of officers from the British Army of the Rhine combined with the filling of most previous clerical vacancies by officers already discharged. With the war economy being quickly wound down and government expenditures cut, economic output fell rapidly and the country was entering recession by the middle of the year. Companies were reluctant to take on new employees and civilian wages fell. Unemployment reached a peak of 11.3 per cent in 1921, up from 0.8 per cent in 1918. Because the authorities considered it was below the status of former officers, they were prohibited from making use of labour exchanges and from claiming unemployment payments that were granted to other ranks. The appointments department noted that by this time most former officers were happy to take almost any employment offered.

=== Return to status quo ante bellum ===
A notice in the Times of 2 November 1920 calling for ex-officers to join the Auxiliary Division

Some temporary officers managed to remain in the army until the Geddes Axe spending cuts of the mid-1920s. (Note: The post-war army was swiftly reduced and by 1922 was smaller than its pre-war strength.) The army returned quickly to its pre-war traditions with senior officer and reformer J. F. C. Fuller claiming that "90 per cent of the army was at work scraping off the reality of war and burnishing up the war-tarnished conventionalities of peace". With the return of expensive social habits many temporary gentlemen in this period found that they could not afford to maintain their positions in the peacetime army, which did not pay uniform or equipment allowances. Those who left found that they could no longer expect the relative social equality with men from higher classes that they had enjoyed in the army. The effect of the war on social equality was complex. Literary and social historian Jonathan Wild argues that the commissioning of temporary gentlemen blurred the lines between the social classes, and that returning officers from the lower classes were more assured and confident, while journalist and historian Reginald Pound argues that the mixing of the lower-middle classes with the pre-war officer class only reinforced the class-consciousness of the Edwardian era.

Attempts were made after the war to open up the academy at Sandhurst to men outside the traditional officer class, following the recommendations of Richard Haldane's 1923 Officers' Training Committee. The reforms were limited to asking county councils to provide scholarship funding, which saw limited success. Haldane's recommendation that officers be permitted to transfer into the regular army from the Territorial Army (which generally had a more diverse officer pool) was not implemented. There was some success with the Y Cadet Programme, which ran between 1922 and 1930 and sought to ensure that 13.5 per cent of regular army officers were commissioned from the ranks. The continued high cost of living for officers meant that most of the 189 Y Cadets chose to serve in the Army Service Corps which had lower costs for socialising, uniforms and equipment. Because of the expensive lifestyle a second income remained a requirement for a regular army officer throughout the inter-war period. As such, by the mid-1930s Sandhurst came to be dominated once more by former public school boys and the sons of serving officers with only 5 per cent of the intake from the other ranks.

Some demobilised temporary gentlemen found employment with the Special Reserve ("Black and Tans") or the Auxiliary Division of the Royal Irish Constabulary in the inter-war years. Historian A. D. Harvey has described some of these men as "schoolboys who had become killers instead of going to university, working-class men who had been disorientated by promotion to the status of officers and gentlemen, fractured personalities whose maladjustments found temporary relief in the 1914–1918 war and whose outward stability depended on the psychic reassurance of a khaki tunic on their back and a Webley .455 at their hip". The constabulary took steps to remove such men from their ranks and by the early 1920s the majority of these corps were formed from former officers of the lower middle classes, many of whom were veterans of Kitchener's Army who had served in the ranks before being commissioned.

=== Cultural impact ===
Robert Graves, who belonged to the traditional officer class, wrote in his memoirs about friction between temporary gentlemen and their regular counterparts.

During the war, the press, particularly Punch, reported on the perceived social inadequacies of the temporary gentlemen and their difficulties integrating into the army. The conflict between regular officers and the temporary gentlemen was also documented in the wartime memoirs of some officers. This included Robert Graves' Good-Bye to All That and Siegfried Sassoon's series of fictionalised memoirs (Graves and Sassoon were members of the pre-war special reserve which drew from the traditional officer class) and that of temporary gentleman Edwin Campion Vaughan, whose lack of a public school education and pre-war position as a customs officer gave him a similar social standing to some of the men under his command. Henry Williamson's semi-autobiographical novel series A Chronicle of Ancient Sunlight focuses on Phillip Maddison, a former clerk who receives a temporary commission during the war and is critical of the pre-war officers who look down on him. Mottram, who found he was expected to resume his junior position at the bank after the war, wrote The Spanish Farm trilogy about Stephen Domer, a bank clerk and temporary officer.

Some temporary gentlemen went on to become leading literary figures of the period; as well as Mottram and Williamson, their ranks included J. B. Priestley, Cecil Roberts, Gerald Bullett and R. C. Sherriff. In Sherriff's classic 1929 fictional play Journey's End, set in a company commander's dugout in March 1918, one of the four officers, Second Lieutenant Trotter, is a man of lower social class promoted from the ranks. The temporary gentleman became a stock character in inter-war literature. H. F. Maltby's 1919 play A Temporary Gentleman focused on Walter Hope, a junior warehouse clerk who was commissioned into the Royal Army Service Corps. The character fails to adjust to the post-war reality, being too "swollen-headed" to return to his pre-war job; the story was made into a film in 1920. Maltby wrote from experience as a 35-year-old artillery NCO serving under officers who "were so obviously lower-middle class and suburban and gave themselves such airs and graces. I wondered what would happen to them when the war was over. I could see a terrible debunking before them". The poet Richard Aldington considered the characterisation of Hope as too simplistic for a time when thousands of ex-officers were unemployed, sleeping rough and willing to take whatever work they could. Aldington wrote The Case of Lieutenant Hall, a fictional short story about a temporary officer who commits suicide after seeing Maltby's play.

The plight of the post-war temporary gentleman was summed up by George Orwell in his 1939 novel Coming Up for Air in which the protagonist, George Bowling, an insurance salesman and former temporary officer recalls that "we'd suddenly changed from gentlemen holding His Majesty's Commission into miserable out-of-works whom nobody wanted". Ernest Raymond's The Old Tree Blossomed features Stephen Gallimor as a clerk who leaves behind his former life to become a temporary gentleman. In D. H. Lawrence's Lady Chatterley's Lover the working-class gamekeeper, Oliver Mellors, is stated to have served as a lieutenant during the war. His ambiguous social position afterwards is remarked upon by his lover, the upper-class Lady Chatterley, when she says "he might almost be a gentleman".

== Second World War and later ==
=== Revival of temporary commissions ===
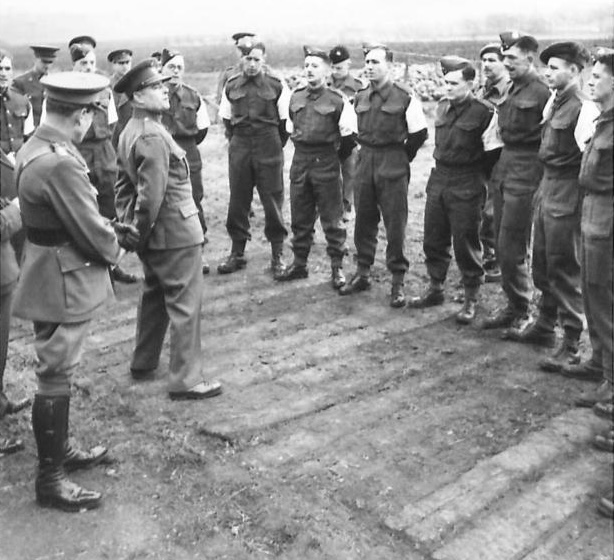
Officer candidates undergo an intelligence test at a 1942 War Office Selection Board.

At the start of the Second World War there were only 14,000 regular army officers and 19,000 Territorial Army officers. In the National Service (Armed Forces) Act 1939, conscription was introduced on 3 September 1939 and as the army expanded over the next six years, some 250,000 men were commissioned, many of them as temporary gentlemen. Before 1939 it had been possible to receive a commission in a unit only with the recommendation of its commanding officer and of the general commanding the division. As such, recruitment tended to come from the traditional officer classes. Efforts had been made by the Liberal Secretary of State for War Leslie Hore-Belisha in 1938 to "democratise" the army by reducing living expenses and introducing scholarships but this failed to make much of an impact. The Labour Party noted at the time that "the present Army system ... under which officer commissions are almost wholly reserved for the sons of the well-to-do is out of date in a democratic country".

The system was gradually reformed; the army replaced the pre-war recommendation system with the Command Interview Boards in 1941. These boards were criticised for being too focused on the traditional officer class and for promoting unsuitable men—leading to high failure rates at the Officer Cadet Training Units. The forward-thinking adjutant-general Ronald Forbes Adam and his assistant Frederick Hubert Vinden reformed the system, introducing the more fair-minded War Office Selection Board (WOSB) in April 1942, where officer candidates were interviewed by trained psychiatrists and psychologists. These were not specifically set-up to diversify recruitment into the lower classes (though this effect was noted) but generally to improve the quality of recruitment. A further measure, the General Service Corps scheme was set up in July 1942 to assess all new army entrants for suitability for a commission. It determined that only 6 per cent of those conscripted were deemed suitable, so recruitment from the lower classes was not significantly increased. Notable examples of working men to receive commissions included a lieutenant who was a former blast furnace labourer, a captain who was a road sweeper and lieutenant-colonels who were clerks, railway porters and bus conductors. Despite the reforms, by the war's end it was found that some 34 per cent of all officers commissioned still came from the public schools.

=== Aftermath of the war ===
At the end of the war the British government purposely staggered the demobilisation of conscripts and temporary officers both because of continuing military garrison requirements across the world and to reduce the impact on the labour market in the United Kingdom. Demobilisation proceeded on a strict timetable that released older and longer serving men first; this left many men waiting their turn bored and inactive in army depots.

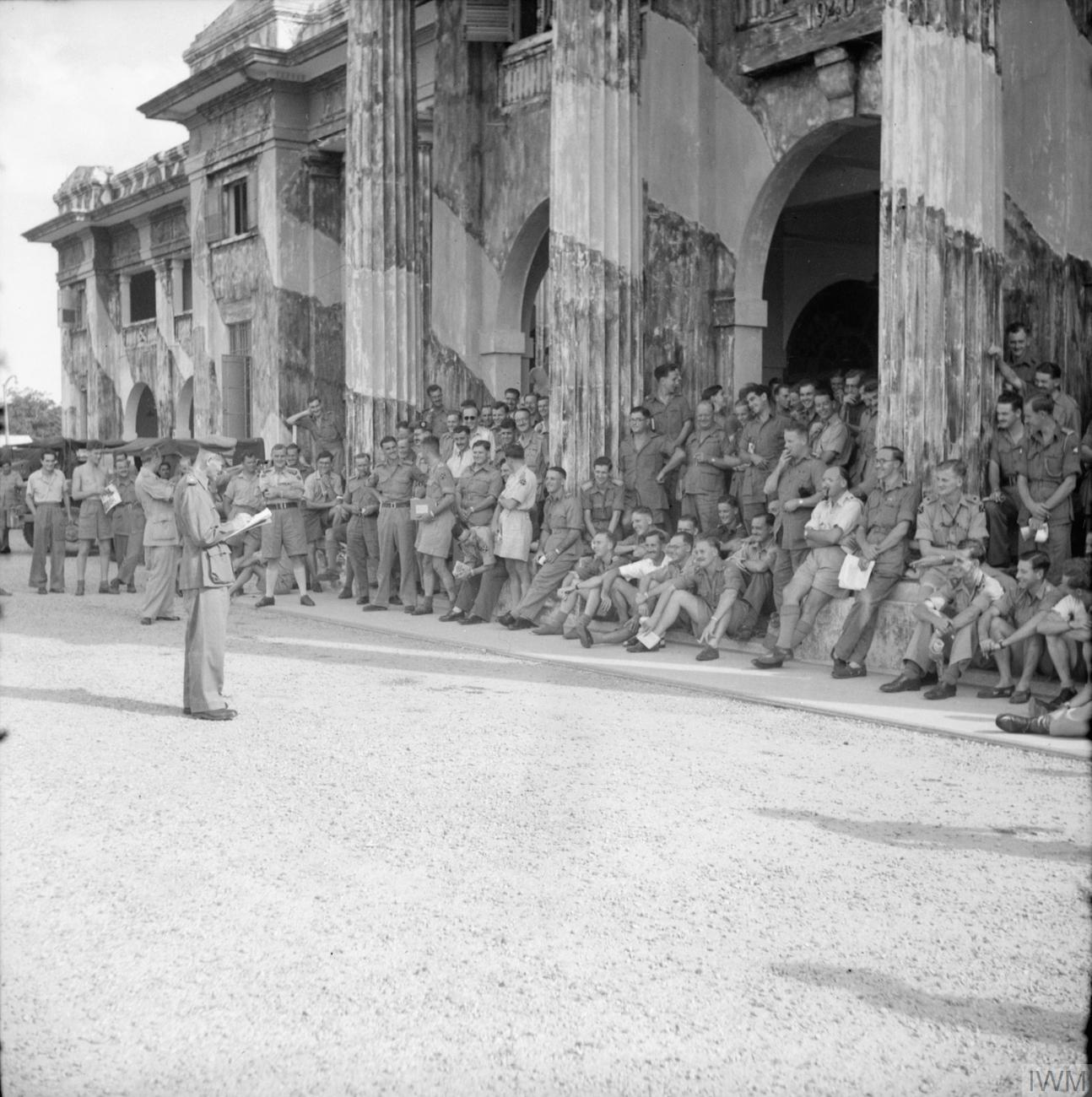
British officers at a transit camp in Singapore awaiting demobilisation

The Reinstatement in Civil Employment Act 1944 required employers to allow former employees to return to their old jobs after demobilisation. Many temporary gentlemen chose not to accept these offers, having achieved greater responsibility and confidence through their military service. Some who chose to return found themselves disappointed; a Royal Marines officer complained that he was treated like an "office boy" and a Royal Artillery officer, who had commanded a gunnery school, found that he was relegated to making tea in a rural Oxfordshire bank. The government's Resettlement Advice Service attempted to assist demobilised soldiers to find employment or training and the appointments department of the Ministry of Labour helped match senior officers to executive vacancies in industry. Some temporary gentlemen became teachers under the Emergency Teacher Training Scheme, established to meet the demand for school places created by the Education Act 1944, which raised the school-leaving age to 15.

Many temporary officers found the jobs available in post-war Britain mundane and less well paid than their army experience, others found themselves unemployed. Temporary gentlemen were the subject of derision, including by some trade unions, for their high salary expectations. Many found it hard to adjust to their civilian lives; former officers sometimes found it difficult to relate to their working-class friends and family. Some temporary gentlemen banded together in military-style organisations such as the far-right British League of Ex-Servicemen and Women or the anti-fascist 43 Group or joined the new Israel Defense Forces. A few became involved in organised crime, though the scale of this was exaggerated in contemporary press reports.

Other former temporary officers joined the colonial police services where they could more easily maintain their status as gentlemen. As with the First World War the post-war memoirs of serving officers are dominated by the works of temporary gentlemen, such as Freddie Spencer Chapman. In Evelyn Waugh's 1945 novel Brideshead Revisited the main character, the middle-class Charles Ryder, despises his subordinate, the temporary gentleman Hooper. Rayner Heppenstall's 1946 short story "Local Boy" focuses on the awkward relationship between a temporary gentleman and his working-class family and neighbours.

The term temporary gentlemen survived after the war to refer to those National Service men who were commissioned as officers but fell out of use with the return of the British Army to a purely volunteer force in 1963. In the post-war years the British Army's officer corps diversified from the traditional officer class; the proportion of Sandhurst entrants educated at fee-paying schools or by tutors fell from 89 per cent in 1939 to around 57 per cent in 1960. Perhaps as a sign that officers were no longer considered gentlemen by virtue of their commission the term "gentleman" was removed from the conduct unbecoming charge in 1972. The trend towards working- and middle-class army officers slowed and a 2019 report found 49 per cent of Sandhurst entrants came from fee-paying schools, despite only 7 per cent of the British population being privately educated. The Army Officer Selection Board, a successor of the WOSB and organised on similar lines, remains in use as an assessment tool for officer applicants.

== Other branches ==
The British Indian Army also had temporary officers during the Second World War, who became known as "emergency commissioned officers". These men were drawn from Indian and European residents of India who received six months of training at newly established OTCs or at the Indian Military Academy alongside the regular intake of British school leavers. The army expanded during the war from fewer than 500 Indian and 3,000 European officers to around 14,000 Indian and 32,750 European officers. The additional officers allowed the British Indian Army to maintain large formations in the Burma campaign. There was, unlike in the First World War, little friction between the British temporary gentlemen and the regular officers. There was discrimination against the officers of Indian background, who historian Tony Gould described as the "new temporary gentlemen". One of the Indian officers, D. K. Palit, who later became a major-general in the Indian Army, recalled "they didn't like us, [we were] at best called WOGs (Westernised Oriental Gentlemen) or niggers", though he noted that Indian officers were better treated by the temporary officers than the pre-war regulars.

Since the Victorian era the Royal Navy had also drawn its officers from the upper middle and upper classes; officers joined at the age of 13 and were typically the sons of former officers or Admiralty civil servants. The navy introduced some reforms during the First World War to allow officers to join at the age of 18 or to be commissioned from the ranks, but their effect was limited. Though the navy expanded in the war years, new officers came from the officer class and were granted permanent commissions. The Second World War caused a change in recruitment, a larger number of new officers were needed and positions were filled by temporary gentlemen commissioned into the Royal Naval Volunteer Reserve. A significant proportion of the temporary gentlemen were from the working and middle classes and the experience drove a change in post-war officer recruitment. In 1956 the Special Duties scheme was established to recruit officers from the ratings. In the modern Royal Navy some 30 per cent of officers previously served as ratings; a 2017 study found that 97 per cent of these men identified as being from a working-class background. By 2019 some 64 per cent of cadets entering Britannia Royal Naval College came from state schools.

The Royal Air Force (RAF), founded in 1918, also tended to recruit its officers from the public schools. Just 14 per cent of officer cadets at the Royal Air Force College Cranwell between 1934 and 1939 came from grammar or state schools. The RAF expanded greatly during the Second World War and also made use of temporary commissions. The RAF drew more temporary gentlemen from the lower classes, as a proportion, than the army and wartime propaganda promoted the force as "classless". Despite this, there was variation within the organisation; Fighter Command was considered an elite and there was considered to be a preference for pilots to be drawn from the traditional officer class. Bomber Command, whose aircraft had larger aircrews with technical positions such as flight engineers and navigators, tended to be more meritocratic. A pre-war programme to commission officers from the best candidates in the Aircraft Apprentice Scheme helped improve recruitment from the working and lower middle classes. In the post-war years, reflecting on the merits of wartime temporary gentlemen and with former apprentices such as Air Marshal Eric Dunn and Marshal of the Royal Air Force Keith Williamson reaching high rank, the RAF moved towards a more merit-base officer selection system. The modern RAF does not keep data on what proportion of its officer candidates come from public or state schools, but a 2006–2007 study found that 75 per cent of RAF officers attending the Advanced Command and Staff Course had attended state schools, a higher proportion than the Royal Navy (70 per cent) and the British Army (58 per cent).

== Use of the term in the Portuguese Army ==
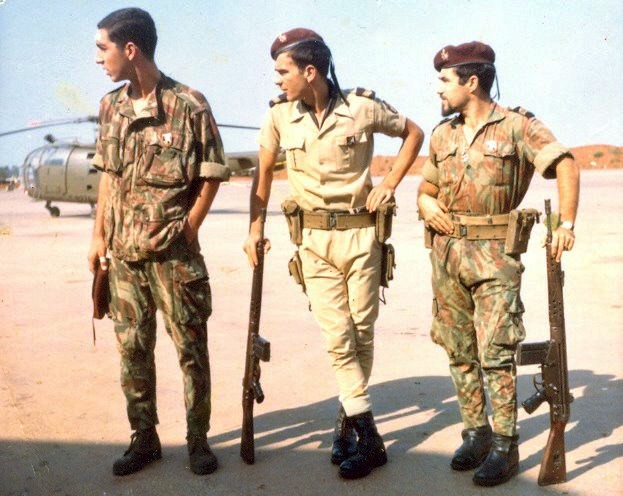
A Portuguese miliciano ensign (left), with a senior corporal and sergeant in Guinea-Bissau, 1965

The term 'milicianos' was used in reference to conscript officers in the Portuguese Army of the 1960s and 1970s and has been translated as "temporary gentlemen". The temporary gentlemen served on active duty alongside regular army officers in colonial wars including the Guinea-Bissau War of Independence. The regulars characterised the temporary gentlemen as "just doctors or lawyers in uniform", though one temporary lieutenant stated that "the milicianos felt that they were being used to do the dirty work". A common saying among the temporary gentlemen was "I'm fed up with this place! I'm fed up with them [the regular officers]! Get me out of here!".

Tensions between temporary and regular officers were increased by a decree of June 1973 that allowed temporary commissions to be converted into permanent commissions via a two-semester course at the national military academy. Because promotions in the Portuguese Army of this period were based almost entirely on seniority, and conscript service was counted towards this, many regular officers found themselves "leap-frogged" by former milicianos. The discontent was one of the causes of the 25 April 1974 Carnation Revolution in which the regular armed forces overthrew the civilian dictatorship government. Portugal later transitioned to an all-professional army, conscription being abolished in 2004.

== See also ==
- Gentleman ranker
- Officer Training Unit, Scheyville
- The Best Years of Our Lives

== Bibliography ==
- Allport, Alan (2009), Demobbed: Coming Home After the Second World War, New Haven, Connecticut: Yale University Press, ISBN 978-0-300-16886-0
- Barua, Pradeep P. (2003), Gentlemen of the Raj, the Indian Army Officer Corps 1817–1949, Westport, Connecticut: Praeger, ISBN 0-275-97999-7, archived from the original on 18 July 2021
- Bean, Charles Edwin Woodrow (1941), Volume I – The Story of ANZAC from the outbreak of war to the end of the first phase of the Gallipoli Campaign, May 4, 1915, Sydney: Angus & Robertson, OCLC 52501250
- Beckett, Ian; Bowman, Timothy; Connelly, Mark (2017), The British Army and the First World War, Cambridge: Cambridge University Press, ISBN 978-1-107-00577-8, archived from the original on 18 July 2021
- Beckett, Ian F. W.; Simpson, Keith (1985), A Nation in Arms: A Social Study of the British Army in the First World War, Manchester: Manchester University Press, ISBN 0-719-01737-8, archived from the original on 18 July 2021
- Bowman, Timothy (April 2009), "Officering Kitchener's Armies: A Case Study of the 36th (Ulster) Division", War in History, 16 (2): 189–212, doi:10.1177/0968344508100989, S2CID 159724707
- Davis, Frank; Maddocks, Graham (1995), Bloody Red Tabs – General Officer Casualties of the Great War, 1914–1918, London: Leo Cooper, ISBN 0-85052-463-6
- Deeks, Roger (May 2017), Officers Not Gentlemen: Officers Commissioned from the Ranks of the Pre-First World War British Regular Army, 1903–1918 (PhD thesis), University of Birmingham, archived from the original on 18 July 2021
- Diamond, Sue (January 2017), From Rating to Officer:Habitus clivé and other struggles associated with promotion in the Royal Navy (PDF) (PhD thesis), University of Portsmouth, archived (PDF) from the original on 18 September 2020
- Dow, Christopher (2000), Major Recessions: Britain and the World, 1920–1995, Oxford: Oxford University Press, ISBN 0-19-924123-6, archived from the original on 18 July 2021
- Emsley, Clive (2017), Exporting British Policing During the Second World War, London: Bloomsbury, ISBN 978-1-3500-2501-1, archived from the original on 18 July 2021
- Farquharson-Roberts, Michael Atholl (October 2012), To the Nadir and Back: The Executive Branch of the Royal Navy 1918–1939 (PhD thesis), University of Exeter, archived from the original on 18 July 2021
- Farwell, Byron (1981), For Queen and Country: Social History of the Victorian and Edwardian Army, London: Allen Lane, ISBN 0-713-91241-3
- Francis, Martin (2011), The Flyer: British Culture and the Royal Air Force 1939–1945, Oxford: Oxford University Press, ISBN 978-0-19-161696-9, archived from the original on 18 July 2021
- Gould, Tony (2000), Imperial Warriors: Britain and the Gurkhas, London: Granta Books, ISBN 1-86207-365-1, archived from the original on 18 July 2021
- Hodgkinson, Peter Eric (August 2013), British Infantry Battalion Commanders in the First World War (PDF) (PhD thesis), University of Birmingham, archived (PDF) from the original on 24 June 2021
- Holmes, Richard (2011), Soldiers: Army Lives and Loyalties from Redcoats to Dusty Warriors, New York: Harper Press, ISBN 978-0-007-22569-9
- James, Lawrence (2006), The Middle Class, London: Hachette, ISBN 978-0-748-12536-4, archived from the original on 18 July 2021
- Leeson, D.M. (2011), The Black and Tans: British Police and Auxiliaries in the Irish War of Independence, Oxford: Oxford University Press, ISBN 978-0-199-59899-1, archived from the original on 18 July 2021
- Lewis-Stempel, John (2010), Six Weeks: The Short and Gallant Life of the British Officer in the First World War, London: Orion, ISBN 978-0-297-86007-5, archived from the original on 18 July 2021
- Mansfield, Nicholas (2001), English Farmworkers and Local Patriotism, 1900–1930, Farnham, Surrey: Ashgate, ISBN 978-0-7546-0297-2, archived from the original on 18 July 2021
- Mansfield, Nick (2016), Soldiers as Workers: Class, Employment, Conflict and the Nineteenth-century Military, Liverpool: Liverpool University Press, ISBN 978-1-781-38278-3, archived from the original on 18 July 2021
- Mileham, Patrick (January 2004), "Fifty Years of British Army Officership 1960–2010", Defense & Security Analysis, 20 (1): 69–86, doi:10.1080/1475179042000195519, S2CID 157340037
- Monahan, Fin (January 2018), The Origins of the Organisational Culture of the Royal Air Force (PDF) (PhD thesis), University of Birmingham, archived (PDF) from the original on 1 January 2021
- O'Connor, Steven (2014), Irish Officers in the British Forces, 1922–45, Houndmills, Hampshire: Palgrave Macmillan, ISBN 978-1-137-35086-2, archived from the original on 18 July 2021
- Otley, C.B. (May 1973), "The Educational Background of British Army Officers", Sociology, 7 (2): 191–209, doi:10.1177/003803857300700203, JSTOR 42851337, S2CID 144727497
- Petter, Martin (March 1994), "'Temporary Gentlemen' in the Aftermath of the Great War: Rank, Status and the Ex-Officer Problem", The Historical Journal, 37 (1): 127–52, doi:10.1017/S0018246X00014734, JSTOR 2640055, S2CID 159723775, archived from the original on 22 May 2021
- Porch, Douglas (1977), The Portuguese Armed Forces and the Revolution, Stanford: Hoover Institution, ISBN 0-85664-391-2, archived from the original on 18 July 2021
- Pulsifer, Cameron (2002), "Beyond the Queen's Shilling: Reflections on the Pay of Other Ranks in the Victorian British Army", Journal of the Society for Army Historical Research, 80 (324): 326–34, ISSN 0037-9700, JSTOR 44230867
- Raugh, Harold E. (2004), The Victorians at War, 1815–1914: An Encyclopedia of British Military History, Santa Barbara, California: ABC CLIO, ISBN 1-57607-925-2, archived from the original on 18 July 2021
- Root, Laura (1 January 2006), ""Temporary Gentlemen" on the Western Front: Class Consciousness and the British Army Officer, 1914–1918", The Osprey Journal of Ideas and Inquiry, All Volumes (2001–2008) (76), archived from the original on 12 December 2012
- Seldon, Anthony; Walsh, David (2020), Public Schools and the Second World War, Barnsley, UK: Pen & Sword Military, ISBN 978-1-52675-039-6, archived from the original on 18 July 2021
- Spiers, Edward M. (1980), The Army and Society 1815–1914, London: Longman, ISBN 978-0-582-48565-5, archived from the original on 18 July 2021
- Thorpe, D.R. (2010), Supermac: The Life of Harold Macmillan, London: Random House, ISBN 978-0-701-17748-5, archived from the original on 18 July 2021
- Turner, E. S. (1956), Gallant Gentlemen: A Portrait of the British Officer, 1600–1956, London: Michael Joseph, OCLC 2162293, archived from the original on 18 July 2021
- Turner, John, ed. (1988), Britain and the First World War, New York: Routledge, ISBN 978-1-317-69214-0, archived from the original on 18 July 2021
- White, Alice (2016), From the Science of Selection to Psychologising Civvy Street: The Tavistock Group, 1939–1948 (PhD thesis), University of Kent, archived from the original on 15 December 2019
- Wild, Jonathan (January 2007), "'A Merciful, Heaven-Sent Release'?: The Clerk and the First World War in British Literary Culture", Cultural and Social History, 4 (1): 73–94, doi:10.1080/14780038.2007.11425738, S2CID 147151436
