= Colston (name) =

Colston is a surname, and also a given name. The name has several origins. It is sometimes from a Middle English given name Colstan, probably from Old Norse kol "charcoal" and steinn "stone". It may also be an English habitation name, from Colston Bassett or Car Colston in Nottinghamshire, or from Coulston in Wiltshire.

== Surname ==
Notable people with the surname include:

- Bob Colston (1928–2013), British sports broadcaster
- Charles Colston, 1st Baron Roundway (1854–1925), British Conservative Party politician
- David Colston, American politician
- Edward Colston (1636–1721), British merchant, benefactor to Bristol, slave trader and Member of Parliament
- Edward Colston (MP for Wells) (died 1719), English Member of Parliament
- Edward Colston (U.S. Representative) (1786–1852), U.S. Representative from Virginia
- Edward Murray Colston, 2nd Baron Roundway (1880–1944), British army officer
- Fifi Colston (born 1960), New Zealand artist and author
- Fred Colston (1884–1918), American tennis player
- Mal Colston (1938–2003), Australian politician
- Marques Colston (born 1983), American football player
- Peter Colston (ornithologist) (born 1935), English ornithologist
- Peter Colston (rugby union) (died 2022), English rugby union player and coach
- Raleigh E. Colston (1825–1896), American professor, soldier, cartographer, and writer
- William Colston (fl. 1610–1612), English settler in Newfoundland

== Given name ==
Notable people with the given name include:

- Howell Colston Featherston (1871–1958), American politician
- William Colston Leigh Sr. (1910–1992), American founder of the Leigh Bureau speakers agency
- Sir Nicholas Colston Lockyer (1855–1933), Australian public servant
- Colston Loveland (born 2004), American football player
- Edward Colston Marshall (1821–1893), American politician
- Bruce Colston Trapnell Jr (born 1982), American bioinformatician
- Colston Warne (1900–1987), American economist
- Colston Weatherington (born 1977), American football player
- Colston Westbrook (1937–1989), American teacher and linguist

== See also ==
- Colson
- Coulston (surname)
