= Colson =

Colson is both a surname and a given name. Notable people with the name include:

== Surname ==
- Audrey Butt Colson (born 1926), British social anthropologist
- Bonzie Colson (born 1996), American basketball player
- Charles Colson (1931–2012), American counsel for Richard Nixon and evangelical Christian leader; father of Emily
- Christian Colson (born 1968), British film producer
- Clément Colson (1853–1939), French economist
- David Grant Colson (1861–1904), American politician from Kentucky
- Elizabeth Colson (1917–2016), American social anthropologist
- Eugène Colson (1913–2000), Belgian resistance fighter
- Ethalinda Colson (stage name, Kathryn Adams; 1893–1959), American silent film actress
- F. D. Colson (died 1958), American rower, coach, and lawyer
- Gail Colson (born ?), British music manager
- Gary Colson (born 1934), American basketball coach
- Greg Colson (born 1956), American artist
- Guillaume-François Colson (1785–1860), French painter
- Henri Colson (1819–1900), Belgian engineer, industrialist, and politician
- Jaime Colson (1901–1975), Dominican Republic artist
- Jean Claude Gilles Colson (1725–1778), French actor
- Jean-François Gilles Colson (1733–1803), French painter
- Jeff Colson (born 1957), American painter and sculptor
- John Colson (1680–1760), British clergyman and mathematician
- Kevin Colson (1937–2018), Australian actor
- Loyd Colson (born 1947), American baseball pitcher
- Ms Von Colson (fl. 1984), German European Court of Justice plaintiff [see: Von Colson v Land Nordrhein-Westfalen]
- Osborne Colson (1916–2006), Canadian figure skater and coach
- Sam Colson (born 1951), American javelin thrower
- Sean Colson (born 1975), American basketball player
- Sydney Colson (born 1989), American basketball player
- Ted Colson (1881–1950), Australian bushman, pastoralist, and pioneer

=== Fictional characters ===
- Zachary Colson, character from Wing Commander II
- Colson, son of Wulfgar, character from The Icewind Dale Trilogy [see: Wulfgar (Forgotten Realms)]

== Given name ==
- Colson Baker (born 1990; known professionally as Machine Gun Kelly), American rapper, singer, songwriter, and actor
- Colson Whitehead (born 1969), American novelist
- Colson Yankoff (born 2000), American football player

== See also ==
- Colson House, a series of historic homes
- Colsons
- Colston
- Coulson
