= Joseph Coulson =

American poet

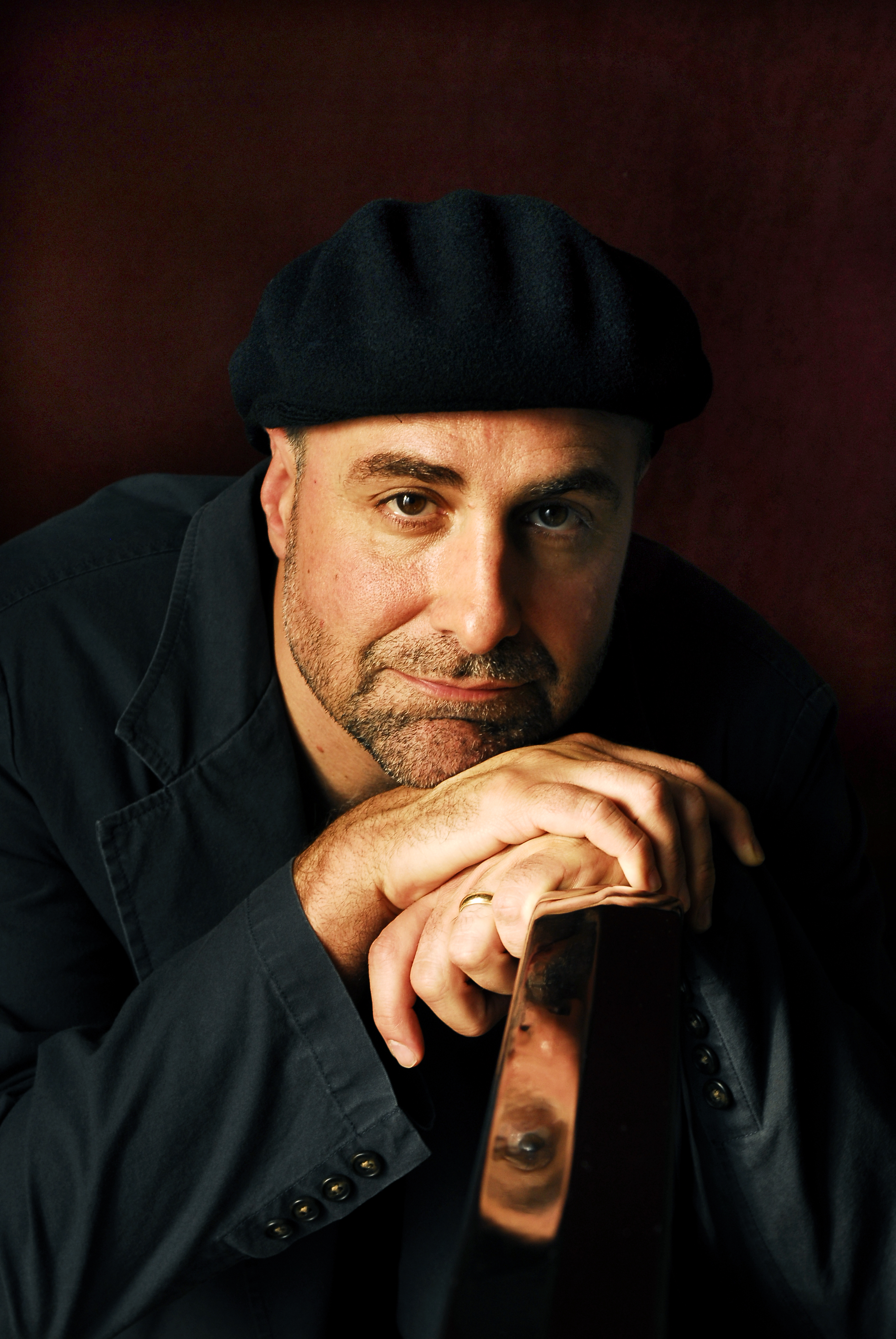
- Born: 1957 (age 68–69)
- Education: Wayne State University (BS); University at Buffalo (MA, PhD)
- Occupations: Novelist; poet; playwright; educator
- Spouse: Christine Hooker

Joseph Coulson (born 1957) is an American novelist, poet, playwright and educator.. His writing is notable for its lyricism and its blending of American history and social criticism. Coulson served as president of the Great Books Foundation from 2014 to 2018. Dr. Coulson now serves as president and Chief Academic Officer of Harrison Middleton University, a private, not-for-profit, distance-learning university offering programs in the humanities.

== Early life ==
Joseph Coulson grew up in Detroit, Michigan. As a youth, he attended both Catholic and public schools and worked as a caddie, grass cutter, janitor, and hospital orderly. He eventually found work as a singer, flautist, and bass player with bands in and around Detroit.

== Education and career ==
Coulson received a B.S. in education from Wayne State University, an M.A. in English from the State University of New York at Buffalo, and a Ph.D. in American literature and poetics from the State University of New York at Buffalo. Coulson has worked as a classroom teacher, English department chair, senior administrator, and English professor. As an instructor and school administrator, Coulson was named a master teacher, served for several years as a mentor teacher and curriculum consultant, and worked to develop comprehensive teacher-training programs.

Coulson served as president of the Great Books Foundation, a nonprofit educational organization, from 2014 to 2018. He previously worked at the Great Books Foundation from 1999 to 2003 as senior editor, editorial director, and chief of staff.

Harrison Middleton University named Joseph Coulson, PhD, as president and chief academic officer of the university, effective July 1, 2018. Harrison Middleton University, noted for their works, ideas, and conversations, is a distance-learning university that offers graduate education in the humanities with concentrations in imaginative literature, natural sciences, philosophy and religion, and social science. Harrison Middleton University promotes student-faculty scholarship through research, discussion, and the development of collaborative publications.

== Creative work ==
Coulson's first novel, The Vanishing Moon (Archipelago Books, 2004), was a Barnes & Noble Great New Writers selection, and it won the Book of the Year Award, Gold Medal in Literary Fiction, from ForeWord. Chronicling the lives of working-class people, The Vanishing Moon was a critical success, and Coulson's prose, themes, and historical range drew comparisons with John Steinbeck, William Maxwell, and Russell Banks. His second novel, Of Song and Water (2007) was a finalist for the Great Lakes Book Award. Both novels earned wide distribution in French and German translations, and The Vanishing Moon was later published as a Harvest Book, the perennial literary series from Harcourt.

Coulson has also published three books of poetry, The Letting Go (1984), A Measured Silence (1986), and Graph (1990). His first play, A Saloon at the Edge of the World (1996), a noir drama showcased by Theater Artists of Marin, enjoyed both popular and critical acclaim in the San Francisco Bay area. Coulson is a recipient of the Tompkins Award in Poetry and the David Gray Writing Fellowship (selected by Robert Creeley), and his essays have appeared in journals and anthologies including The Barnabe Mountain Review, Walt Whitman of Mickle Street, The Critical Survey of Poetry, and The Greenfield Review.

== The Great Books Foundation ==
The Great Books Foundation is an independent, nonprofit educational organization who for more than sixty years has been a leader in close reading, critical thinking, and cooperative learning for the purpose of advancing civil discourse, civic awareness, and social justice.

The Foundation publishes a wide range of literature anthologies, nonfiction materials, and other classroom books that are designed to empower K–12 students to become independent readers and thinkers. Schools that integrate Great Books materials into their curriculum help their students improve their critical thinking, reading comprehension, writing, and speaking and listening skills.

The Foundation also sponsors programs in literacy and communication for underserved groups; these initiatives are an important part of the Foundation's mission to serve the common good.

Coulson discusses the work of the Great Books Foundation and how great literature affects 21st century critical thinking skills in an interview with Education Talk Radio.

== Personal life ==
Coulson lives in Chicago, Illinois. His wife, Christine Hooker, is the Stanley G. Harris Sr. Professor of Psychiatry in the Department of Psychiatry, and Professor in the Department of Diagnostic Radiology at Rush University Medical Center.

== Bibliography ==
=== Poetry ===
- The Letting Go, The Hundred Pound Press,1984
- A Measured Silence, The Hundred Pound Press,1986
- Graph, Bombshelter Press,1990

=== Plays ===
- A Saloon at the Edge of the World (produced as Edge of the World, co-authored with William Relling, Jr., 1996)
- Junkyard of the Gods (co-authored with William Relling, Jr., 1999)

=== Novels ===
- The Vanishing Moon, Archipelago Books, 2004; Harcourt/Harvest paperback, 2005; also published in German and French translations
- Of Song and Water, Archipelago Books, 2007; paperback in 2010; also published in French.

=== External links ===
- Coulson’s October 2014 interview on Education Talk Radio—“How Great Literature Affects 21st Century Critical Thinking Skills.”
- Coulson on Archipelago Books website
- Bombshelter Press
- Harcourt Reading Guide for The Vanishing Moon
