= Amna Ellouh =

Moroccan writer and journalist (1926–2015)

Amna Ellouh (1926–2015) was a Moroccan writer and journalist born in Al Hoceima. Her novel Queen Khanatha, Wife of Mawla Ismail (الملكة خناثة قرينة المولى إسماعيل) is considered the first novel by a woman to be published in Arabic in the Maghreb.

== Background ==
Her name is Amna bint Abdel Karim Al-Louh, a Moroccan writer, born in 1926 in Al Hoceima. She grew up in the city of Tetouan, where she completed her primary and secondary education. She studied at the Faculty of Letters at the University of Madrid and acquired her degree in 1957. Amna Ellouh was the first Moroccan woman who achieved this at the University of Madrid. She continued at the same university and, in 1978, obtained a State Doctorate in Arts.
