= Great Books Foundation =

Education organization

- Formation: 1947; 79 years ago
- Founders: Robert Maynard Hutchins, Mortimer Adler
- Type: Nonprofit
- Headquarters: Chicago, Illinois
- President: Valentina Texera-Parissi
- Key people: John J. Cavanaugh, Norman Cousins, Clifton Fadiman, Clare Boothe Luce, Elkan Harrison Powell
- Affiliations: University of Chicago, Encyclopædia Britannica
- Website: greatbooks.org

The Great Books Foundation is an independent nonprofit educational organization in Chicago, Illinois, that publishes collections of classic and modern literature to support reading and discussion programs for children and adults.

The foundation has two main programs: Junior Great Books, serving students in kindergarten through high school, and Great Books Discussion for college students, continuing education, and book groups. The organization derives its income from the sale of books, teacher professional development fees, contributions, and grants.

== History ==
Established in 1947 by a group of prominent citizens led by University of Chicago Chancellor Robert Maynard Hutchins and Mortimer Adler, the Great Books Foundation began as a grassroots movement to promote continuing liberal education for the general public. The organization's board of directors was formed in 1949 with Hutchins and Adler, University of Notre Dame president John J. Cavanaugh, Encyclopædia Britannica president Elkan Harrison Powell, Marshall Field's president Garret L. Bergen, and authors Norman Cousins, Clifton Fadiman, and Clare Boothe Luce.

In 1960, the foundation extended its mission to children with the introduction of Junior Great Books.

From 2001 to 2011, the foundation published the quarterly magazine, The Common Review.

== Program ==
Great Books discussions use a distinctive discussion method called "Shared Inquiry", in which the leader starts with an open-ended question about the meaning of a selection and then asks follow-up questions to help participants develop their ideas. Developed by the Great Books Foundation, Shared Inquiry is related to Socratic discussion but is distinguished by the fact that the basic discussion question is one to which the leader does not know the answer.

== See also ==
- Great Books
- Western canon
- St. John's College (Annapolis/Santa Fe)
- Shimer College
- Harrison Middleton University
- Saint Mary's College of California
