= Thomas Washington (writer) =

American journalist and essayist

Thomas Washington is an American journalist, columnist and essayist.

== Biography ==
Washington was born in Chicago, Illinois. He is currently married and lives in Virginia, where he works as a journalist, essayist, and head librarian at the Potomac School, McLean, Virginia. He was a 2008 Yaddo fellow.

== Selected works ==
- Washington, Thomas (2009-02-12), "Life's Work: The surprising pleasure of the annual Social Security statement", The Smart Set
- Washington, Thomas (2008-02-03), "Kids Can't Focus These Days. Then Again, Neither Can I.", The Washington Post, pp. B02
- Washington, Thomas (2007-01-21), "A Librarian's Lament: Books Are a Hard Sell", The Washington Post, pp. B03
- Washington, Thomas (2007), "The Quarterly Reader and Writer", Antioch Review, vol. 65, no. 1, pp. 26–34
- Washington, Thomas (2006-09-15), "BackTalk: The 21st-Century Dynamo", Library Journal: 42
- Washington, Thomas (Spring 2006), "The Librarian's Lament: Junk Research and the Internet" (PDF), The Common Review, 4 (4): 22–29
- Washington, Thomas (2006-05-01), "The Subtle Approach: a school librarian surreptitiously tantalizes teens with book displays", American Libraries: 38–39
- Washington, Thomas (Winter 2005), "My Distant Education", New England Review, 26 (1): 163–172
- Washington, Thomas (Winter 2005), "Have You Read My Manuscript?", Post Road, no. 9, pp. 83–88
- Washington, Thomas (2005-03-16), "Natural Progression" (PDF), Chicago Tribune, pp. 1–5
- Washington, Thomas (Spring 2004), "My High School Library", Massachusetts Review, 45 (1), Amherst: 72–89, ISSN 0025-4878
- Washington, Thomas (Winter 2003), "Sprechen Sie Deutsch?", North Dakota Quarterly, 70 (1): 68–74
- Washington, Tom (2001-02-06), "Smoking the Great Outdoors", Salon.com, p. 2, archived from the original on 2003-01-13
- Washington, Tom (2001-05-14), "Smoke Screen", In These Times, Hamburg, pp. 16–18
- Washington, Thomas (1999-12-12), "Old Bombs Remind Germans of War", The Boston Globe, p. 12
