= 1910 U.S. National Championships – Men's singles =

Men's singles
- 1910 U.S. National Championships

Final
- Champion: (United States) William Larned
- Runner-up: (United States) Tom Bundy
- Score: 6–1, 5–7, 6–0, 6–8, 6–1

Events
Singles	men	women
Doubles	men	women
- U.S. National Championships

Defending champion William Larned defeated Tom Bundy in the Challenge Round 6–1, 5–7, 6–0, 6–8, 6–1 to win the men's singles tennis title at the 1910 U.S. National Championships. Bundy defeated Beals Wright in the All Comers' Final.

The event was held at the Newport Casino in Newport, R.I. in the United States. There were more than 128 players in the draw.

== Challenge round ==
Challenge Round
(United States) William Larned	6	5	6	6	6
(United States) Tom Bundy	1	7	0	8	1

== All Comers' finals ==
Quarterfinals
(United States) Charles Cutting	2	3	5
(United States) Edward Whitney	6	6	7
(United States) Maurice McLoughlin	3	3	2
(United States) Beals Wright	6	6	6
(United States) Dean Mathey	4	6	4
(United States) Fred Colston	6	8	6
(United States) Tom Bundy	4	6	6	6
(United States) William Cragin	6	4	3	2

Semifinals
(United States) Edward Whitney	6	5	6	2	5
(United States) Beals Wright	4	7	4	6	7
(United States) Fred Colston	6	4	3	2
(United States) Tom Bundy	4	6	6	6

Finals
(United States) Beals Wright	8	3	2	8
(United States) Tom Bundy	6	6	6	10

== Earlier rounds ==
1st round - C. Jones (United States) d. (United States) J. Crookston w/o
J. Cote (United States) d. (United States) H. Seymour w/o
R. Palmer (United States) d. (United States) T. Slidwell 6-2,3-6,6-2,6-2
J. Todd (United States) d. (United States) J. DuBarry 6-2,6-3,6-3
C. Cole (United States) d. (United States) R. Gambrill 9-7,6-2,6-0
R. Hoerr (United States) d. (United States) N. Vose 6-3,6-3,3-6,6-2
F. Sulloway (United States) d. (United States) R. McCloud 6-1,6-1,6-1
A. Lapsley (United States) d. (United States) T. Potter w/o
W. Schroeder (United States) d. (United States) G. Keeler 3-6,6-3,6-4,6-3
W. Bull (United States) d. (United States) C. Andrews w/o
J. Jones (United States) d. (United States) H. Cross 6-3,3-6,6-2,6-1
M. Clark (United States) d. (United States) S. Merihew w/o
N. Niles (United States) d. (United States) F. Bain w/o
B. Wright (United States) d. (United States) W. Rosenbaum 6-3,6-1,6-2
G. Church (United States) d. (United States) F. Washburn 6-4,6-2,6-1
R. Holden (United States) d. (United States) H. Voshell 6-2,2-6,6-1,6-4
E. Stille (United States) d. (United States) D. Dilworth 6-2,6-3,6-4
E. Frailey (United States) d. (United States) J. Talmidge w/o
E. Pendergast (United States) d. (United States) R. MacIlvane w/o
P. Fosdick (United States) d. (United States) V. Astor 6-4,6-4,2-6,6-3
F. Frelinghuysen (United States) d. (United States) R. Dieter w/o
F. Paul (United States) d. (United States) W. Manice w/o
E. Gould (United States) d. (United States) C. Lippitt 6-3,6-2,6-1
H. Knight (United States) d. (United States) N. Hutchinson w/o
E. Gross (United States) d. (United States) G. Groesbeck 6-3,6-1,6-1
R. Richardson (United States) d. (United States) C. Sands w/o
M. Chace (United States) d. (United States) C. Richardson 6-0,6-0,6-0
N. Johnson (United States) d. (United States) W. Burden w/o
E. Sheppard (United States) d. (United States) G. Parrish 6-4,6-8,6-4,6-4
F. Inman (United States) d. (United States) W. Pate 6-4,10-8,6-4
A. Dabney (United States) d. (United States) S. Wagstaff 6-2,6-3,6-1
C. Cooke (United States) d. (United States) E. Torrey 6-1,6-1,6-3
W. Washburn (United States) d. (United States) G. Hobbs 6-2,6-0,6-2
T. Hendrick (United States) d. (United States) C. Sherman 6-1,6-0,6-1
G. Hinckley (United States) d. (United States) R. Livingston w/o
R. Perkins (United States) d. (United States) A. Yarnel w/o
D. Mathey (United States) d. (United States) P. Degener w/o
T. Blumer (United States) d. (United States) A. Baker 6-1,6-3,6-1
F. Burr (United States) d. (United States) G. Touchard w/o
C. Bull (United States) d. (United States) P. Hawk w/o
H. MacKinney (United States) d. (United States) W. Heyl 6-1,6-2,6-1
A. Reggio (United States) d. (United States) W. Bourne 6-4,6-2,5-7,6-4
G. Adee (United States) d. (United States) R. Thomas w/o
J. Cushman (United States) d. (United States) F. Derham w/o
C. Gardner (United States) d. (United States) J. Jackson w/o
W. Cooke (United States) d. (United States) W. Symington 6-2,6-3,6-2
S. Beals (United States) d. (United States) W. McCreath w/o
F. Watrous (United States) d. (United States) C. Garland 6-4,2-6,6-3,6-2
A. Codman (United States) d. (United States) H. Colton 6-2,8-6,10-8
W. Siverd (United States) d. (United States) F. Thomas 6-4,6-1,6-4
G. Beals (United States) d. (United States) T. Jay 6-0,6-2,6-1
W. Roberts (United States) d. (United States) D. Campbell w/o
E. Leo (United States) d. (United States) L. Thomas 12-10,6-3,3-6,3-6,6-3

2nd round - C. Cutting (United States) d. (United States) D. Appleton 6-2,6-2,6-2
F. Fox (United States) d. (United States) T. Ridgeway w/o
L. Hobbs (United States) d. (United States) F. Reeves 6-4,6-3,6-1
J. Kyte (United States) d. (United States) J. Thomas w/o
A. Sands (United States) d. (United States) C. King 3-6,7-5,4-6,6-3,6-1
J. Billings (United States) d. (United States) W. Brown w/o
K. Smith (United States) d. (United States) F. Cutting w/o
A. Stillman (United States) d. (United States) R. Hazard w/o
A. Thacher (United States) d. (United States) E. Grosvenor w/o
F. Harris (United States) d. (United States) B. Wagner w/o
E. Winston (United States) d. (United States) J. Brown 6-2,6-2,8-6
A. Hammett (United States) d. (United States) F. Edgill w/o
E. Whitney (United States) d. (United States) R. Brooks w/o
S. McKean (United States) d. (United States) J. Tomlinson w/o
F. Williams (United States) d. (United States) M. Champlin w/o
A. Champlin (United States) d. (United States) G. Thompson w/o
T. Pell (United States) d. (United States) W. Johnson 7-5,8-6,6-4
M. McLoughlin (United States) d. (United States) B. M. Grant 6-2,6-1,6-0
C. Jones (United States) d. (United States) F. Conrad w/o
R. Palmer (United States) d. (United States) J. Cote 6-1,6-4,6-3
C. Cole (United States) d. (United States) J. Todd 2-6,6-3,6-8,6-4,6-3
F. Sulloway (United States) d. (United States) R. Hoerr 9-7,6-2,6-4
A. Lapsley (United States) d. (United States) W. Schroeder 6-2,6-3,6-4
J. Jones (United States) d. (United States) W. Bull 6-1,6-2,6-1
N. Niles (United States) d. (United States) M. Clark 6-2,6-3,6-3
B. Wright (United States) d. (United States) G. Church 7-5,3-6,6-1,6-1
R. Holden (United States) d. (United States) E. Stille 6-3,6-0,7-5
E. Pendergast (United States) d. (United States) E. Frailey 6-2,6-2,6-1
P. Fosdick (United States) d. (United States) F. Frelinghuysen 6-1,6-8,6-3,4-6,6-2
F. Paul (United States) d. (United States) E. Gould 4-6,4-6,8-6,6-4,7-5
E. Gross (United States) d. (United States) H. Knight 6-0,6-0,6-1
M. Chace (United States) d. (United States) R. Richardson 6-0,6-1,6-2
N. Johnson (United States) d. (United States) E. Sheppard 6-4,2-6,3-6,6-3,7-5
F. Inman (United States) d. (United States) A. Dabney 6-4,6-4,9-7
W. Washburn (United States) d. (United States) C. Cooke 6-3,6-3,6-4
T. Hendrick (United States) d. (United States) G. Hinckley 6-3,6-2,6-3
D. Mathey (United States) d. (United States) R. Perkins 6-0,6-1,6-0
F. Burr (United States) d. (United States) T. Blumer 6-2,2-6,6-2,6-1
C. Bull (United States) d. (United States) H. MacKinney 8-6,11-9,6-2
A. Reggio (United States) d. (United States) G. Adee 6-3,4-6,8-6,6-3
C. Gardner (United States) d. (United States) J. Cushman 6-2,6-2,6-3
S. Beals (United States) d. (United States) W. Cooke 6-0,6-3,6-2
F. Watrous (United States) d. (United States) A. Codman 6-0,6-2,1-6,6-3
W. Siverd (United States) d. (United States) G. Beals 7-9,9-7,6-4,6-4
E. Leo (United States) d. (United States) W. Roberts w/o
F. Colston (United States) d. (United States) F. Mauslan 6-2,6-2,6-1
L. Roper (United States) d. (United States) R. Black 6-4,6-2,6-8,2-6,6-3
M. Charlock (United States) d. (United States) A. Griscom 6-1,8-6,6-3
R. Wilson (United States) d. (United States) R. Griswold 6-3,6-2,6-3
G. Thomas (United States) d. (United States) H. Williamson w/o
F. Hoffman (United States) d. (United States) T. Mullin w/o
C. Amory (United States) d. (United States) R. Taylor w/o
J. Holcombe (United States) d. (United States) J. Taylor 6-1,6-1,6-3
H. Nickerson (United States) d. (United States) R. Grant w/o
T. Bundy (United States) d. (United States) P. Randolph 6-0,6-0,6-0
S. Henshaw (United States) d. (United States) G. Lyons w/o
W. Cragin (United States) d. (United States) H. MacVicar 6-0,6-0,6-0
M. Colton (United States) d. (United States) C. Gammell 3-6,7-5,8-6,3-6,6-4
J. Ames (United States) d. (United States) G. Caner 6-2,13-11,6-0
E. Taylor (United States) d. (United States) L. Noel w/o
F. Prichett (United States) d. (United States) C. Winslow w/o
C. Biddle (United States) d. (United States) D. Newton w/o
H. Slocum (United States) d. (United States) H. Simmons 6-2,7-5,6-1
H. Stiness (United States) d. (United States) M. Kernochan w/o

3rd round - C. Cutting (United States) d. (United States) F. Fox 6-4,4-6,5-7,7-5,9-7
J. Kyte (United States) d. (United States) L. Hobbs 6-4,6-4,6-3
A. Sands (United States) d. (United States) J. Billings 7-5,1-6,6-3,6-4
A. Stillman (United States) d. (United States) K. Smith 6-3,6-2,4-6,7-5
F. Harris (United States) d. (United States) A. Thacher 6-0,6-1,6-0
A. Hammett (United States) d. (United States) E. Winston 6-4,6-1,6-1
E. Whitney (United States) d. (United States) S. McKean 6-4,6-0,3-6,6-0
A. Champlin (United States) d. (United States) F. Williams 6-8,4-6,7-5,6-3,8-6
M. McLoughlin (United States) d. (United States) T. Pell 6-3,10-8,6-3
R. Palmer (United States) d. (United States) C. Jones 6-1,6-3,1-6,6-2
F. Sulloway (United States) d. (United States) C. Cole w/o
J. Jones (United States) d. (United States) A. Lapsley 6-1,6-2,6-1
B. Wright (United States) d. (United States) N. Niles 6-4,3-6,6-3,6-3
R. Holden (United States) d. (United States) E. Pendergast 6-1,7-9,6-3,6-2
P. Fosdick (United States) d. (United States) F. Paul 6-4,4-6,6-2,6-2
M. Chace (United States) d. (United States) E. Gross 6-2,5-7,1-6,6-4,6-4
F. Inman (United States) d. (United States) N. Johnson 8-6,6-2,6-1
T. Hendrick (United States) d. (United States) W. Washburn 5-7,6-3,6-0,4-6,6-4
D. Mathey (United States) d. (United States) F. Burr 3-6,6-4,8-6,6-3
C. Bull (United States) d. (United States) A. Reggio 6-8,3-6,6-2,6-4,7-5
C. Gardner (United States) d. (United States) S. Beals 6-2,6-2,6-1
W. Siverd (United States) d. (United States) F. Watrous 6-4,6-4,6-1
F. Colston (United States) d. (United States) E. Leo 6-3,6-1,6-1
M. Charlock (United States) d. (United States) L. Roper 6-2,6-3,3-6,6-2
G. Thomas (United States) d. (United States) R. Wilson 6-3,7-5,6-2
F. Hoffman (United States) d. (United States) C. Amory w/o
H. Nickerson (United States) d. (United States) J. Holcombe 7-9,7-9,6-2,6-4,6-3
T. Bundy (United States) d. (United States) S. Henshaw 6-2,6-4,6-1
W. Cragin (United States) d. (United States) M. Colton 6-0,6-2,6-0
J. Ames (United States) d. (United States) E. Taylor 3-6,6-2,6-2,6-3
C. Biddle (United States) d. (United States) F. Prichett 6-3,6-2,6-1
H. Slocum (United States) d. (United States) H. Stiness 6-4,6-3,6-1

4th round - C. Cutting (United States) d. (United States) J. Kyte 6-3,8-6,6-0
A. Stillman (United States) d. (United States) A. Sands 6-4,6-3,6-4
F. Harris (United States) d. (United States) A. Hammett 6-3,6-3,6-3
E. Whitney (United States) d. (United States) A. Champlin 6-2,6-2,6-1
M. McLoughlin (United States) d. (United States) R. Palmer 6-1,2-6,6-3,6-2
J. Jones (United States) d. (United States) F. Sulloway 3-6,6-2,10-8,6-1
B. Wright (United States) d. (United States) R. Holden 6-3,7-5,9-7
M. Chace (United States) d. (United States) P. Fosdick 6-1,6-1,6-2
F. Inman (United States) d. (United States) T. Hendrick 6-3,6-4,4-6,6-3
D. Mathey (United States) d. (United States) C. Bull 6-4,9-7,4-6,6-4
C. Gardner (United States) d. (United States) W. Siverd 6-4,6-2,4-6,6-4
F. Colston (United States) d. (United States) M. Charlock 2-6,6-1,6-3,6-4
G. Thomas (United States) d. (United States) F. Hoffman 6-0,6-2,6-2
T. Bundy (United States) d. (United States) H. Nickerson 6-4,6-2,6-4
W. Cragin (United States) d. (United States) J. Ames 7-5,6-3,8-6
C. Biddle (United States) d. (United States) H. Slocum 6-2,6-3,6-8,5-7,6-4

5th round - C. Cutting (United States) d. (United States) A. Stillman 8-10,6-4,3-6,6-4,6-2
E. Whitney (United States) d. (United States) F. Harris 6-1,4-6,2-6,6-1,6-3
M. McLoughlin (United States) d. (United States) J. Jones 7-5,6-4,6-4
B. Wright (United States) d. (United States) M. Chace 6-1,6-2,6-3
D. Mathey (United States) d. (United States) F. Inman 6-3,6-2,6-2
F. Colston (United States) d. (United States) C. Gardner 2-6,6-2,6-3,6-4
T. Bundy (United States) d. (United States) G. Thomas 6-3,6-3,6-4
W. Cragin (United States) d. (United States) C. Biddle 1-6,6-4,6-2,6-4

Preceded by 1910 Wimbledon Championships – Men's singles	Grand Slam men's singles	Succeeded by 1911 Australasian Championships – Men's singles
