= Some Desperate Glory =

E.C. Campion's 1917 war diary, published 1981

Some Desperate Glory: The World War I Diary of a British Officer
- Author: Edwin Campion Vaughan
- Genre: War diary
- Publisher: Henry Holt and Company
- Publication date: 1981

Some Desperate Glory: The World War I Diary of a British Officer is the diary of a British officer (Edwin Campion Vaughan), written during the first eight months of 1917 while he was deployed near the Cambrai sector and then moved up in late July to Ypres at the start of the Battle of Passchendaele. The diary was published posthumously in 1981 by Henry Holt and Company. Writing in the Wall Street Journal in 2006, James J. Cramer cites Some Desperate Glory as one of the five best books on war: “Vaughan describes the screams of the wounded who had sought refuge in the freshly gouged holes only to find themselves slowly drowning as rain fell and the water level rose. A relentlessly stark account of the war's bloodiest, most futile battle.”

Vaughan ended his diary on August 28, reflecting the futility of Passchendaele with: " So this was the end of 'D' Company. Feeling sick and lonely, I returned to my tent to write out my casualty report; but instead I sat on the floor and drank whisky after whisky as I gazed into a black and empty future."
