= William Coulson =

William Coulson may refer to:

- William Coulson (mining engineer) (1791–1865), mining engineer and master shaft sinker
- William Coulson (surgeon) (1802–1877), English surgeon
- William Lisle Blenkinsopp Coulson (1840–1911), English army officer
- Willie Coulson (born 1951), English professional footballer
