= Coulston (surname) =

Coulston is a surname, probably an English habitation name from Coulston in Wiltshire.

Notable people with the surname include:

- Ashley Coulston, Australian convicted murderer
- Frank Coulston (born 1942), Scottish footballer
- Fred Coulston, American toxicologist who established the Coulston Foundation, a former research facility in New Mexico
- Jean Coulston (1934–2001), New Zealand cricketer
- Peter W. Coulston, an American aviation electronics technician after whom the Coulston Glacier in Antarctica is named
- Walter Coulston (1912–1990), English footballer

== See also ==
- Colston (name)
