= Elkan Harrison Powell =

President of Encyclopaedia Britannica (1888–1966)

Elkan Harrison Powell (21 November 1888 – 8 May 1966) was a president of Encyclopædia Britannica Inc.

Powell introduced the policies of continuous revision and of leveraging the Britannica's fame to market successful spin-off products, such as historical overviews, compilations of good Britannica articles, children's encyclopedias and atlases. These policies are still in practice today.

Powell was a vice president at Sears Roebuck in 1932, when the publisher of the Britannica, Benjamin J. Cox, resigned. Powell became his replacement and quickly analyzed the factors affecting the profitability of the Britannica. In 1933, he introduced the continuous revision policy.. New Britannica-branded products such as the 12-volume children's encyclopedia, Britannica Junior, appeared a year later.
