= Harrison Middleton University =

Distance-learning university

Coordinates: 33.407433°N 111.922466°W

- Type: Private, online university
- Established: 1998; 28 years ago
- President: Joseph Coulson
- Academic staff: 12 full-time, 16 part-time
- Location: Tempe, Arizona, United States
- Website: www.hmu.edu

Harrison Middleton University is a private online university with its headquarters in Tempe, Arizona. It was founded in 1998 and offers Master of Arts, Doctor of Arts, and Doctor of Education programs in the humanities. Harrison Middleton University focuses its scope on the Great Books. It is accredited by the Distance Education Accrediting Commission.

== History ==
Harrison Middleton University was founded in 1998. The Arizona State Board for Private Postsecondary Education granted the College of the Humanities and Sciences, Harrison Middleton University a Regular Degree License in 2003.

== Academics ==
Harrison Middleton University offers the Master of Arts, Doctor of Arts, and Doctor of Education degrees. It is accredited by the Distance Education Accrediting Commission (DEAC).

== Quarterly Discussion series ==
The Quarterly Discussion series occurs in January, April, July, and October. Each quarter focuses on a different discipline: Natural Science, Imaginative Literature, Philosophy and Religion, and Social Science. Students, alumni, faculty, friends of the university, and members of the public gather online to share their ideas about short readings across a broad spectrum of subjects. These readings are selected by HMU staff who also lead the discussions. The online discussions are open to all at no cost.

== HMU: Dialogues ==
HMU's biannual newsletter, HMU: Dialogues, celebrates the accomplishments of the HMU community. Distributed in spring and fall, the newsletter contains literary criticism; upcoming calendars; library information; as well as updates on students, alumni, staff, and faculty.
