= Doctor of Arts =

Advanced academic degree

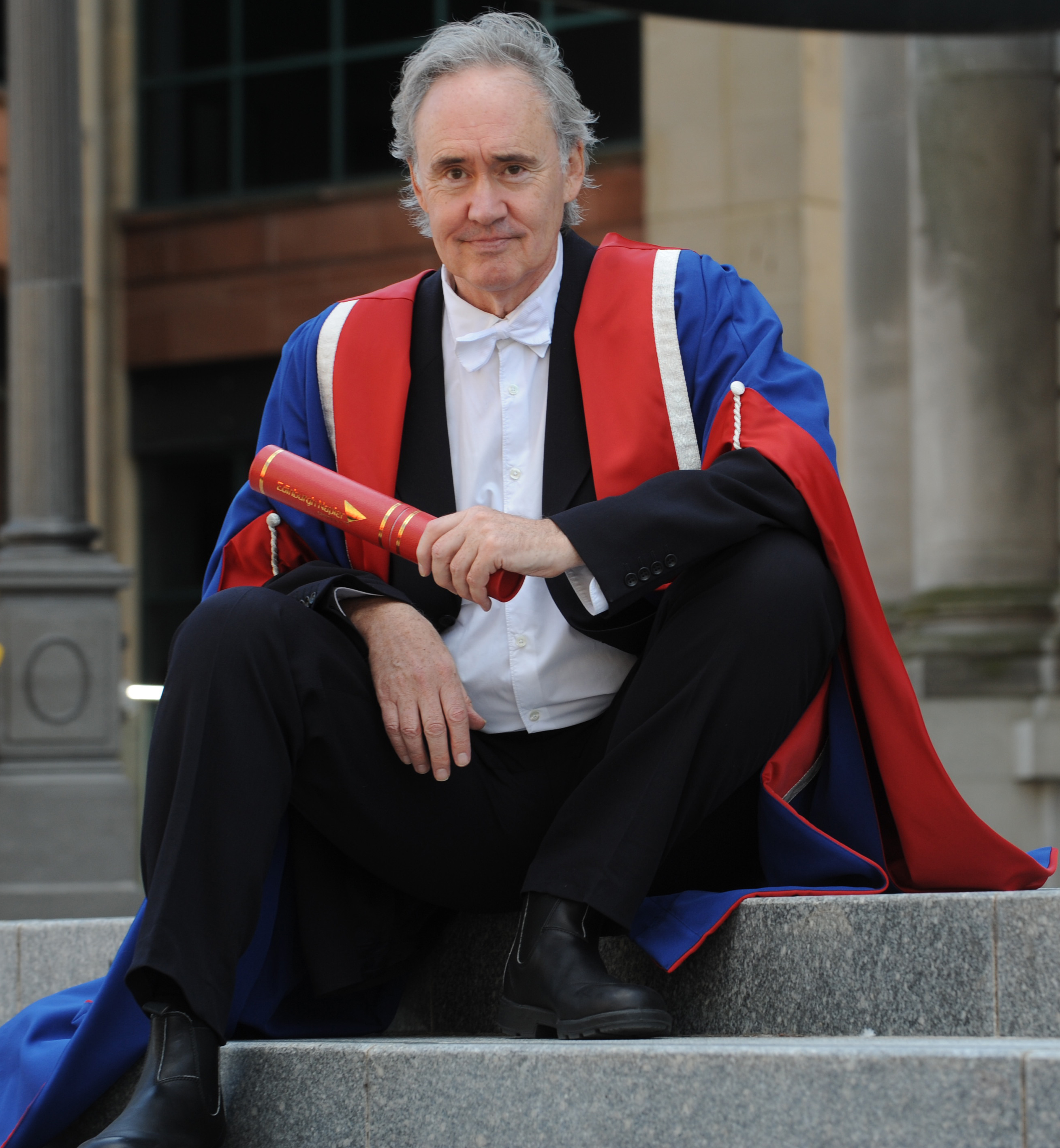
British actor Nigel Planer wearing the academic dress of a Doctor of Arts, awarded as an honorary degree by Edinburgh Napier University

The Doctor of Arts (D.A.; occasionally D.Arts or Art.D. from the Latin artium doctor) is a discipline-based terminal doctoral degree that was originally conceived and designed to be an alternative to the traditional research-based Doctor of Philosophy (Ph.D.) and the education-based Doctor of Education (Ed.D.). Like other doctorates, the D.A. is an academic degree of the highest level. The D.A. is also frequently conferred as an honorary degree with the added designation of honoris causa.

The Carnegie Foundation was the first to fund ten universities with seed money to initiate the degree.

== Europe ==
In 2016, ELIA (European League of Institute of the Arts) launched The Florence Principles on the Doctorate in the Arts. The Florence Principles, relating to the Salzburg Principles and the Salzburg Recommendations of the EUA (European University Association), define the differences between a Doctorate in the Arts compared to a scientific doctorate or Ph.D. degree. The Florence Principles have been endorsed by the European Association of Conservatoires, CILECT, the Cumulus Association, and the Society for Artistic Research.

=== Scandinavia ===
In Finland, the Doctor of Arts degree is a research-based qualification awarded by the University of Art and Design Helsinki upon successful completion of studies and a dissertation in the fields of art and design.

== Other national variations ==
=== Argentina ===
In Argentina, the Doctorate of Arts is offered by the National University of Córdoba and the National University of Rosario.

=== Australia ===
In Australia, the Doctor of Creative Arts degree is offered at several universities as a terminal degree in the field.

=== United States ===
While the PhD is the most common doctoral degree in the United States, the U.S. Department of Education and the National Science Foundation recognize a number of research-oriented doctoral degrees such as the D.A. as "equivalent".

The idea for a Doctor of Arts degree was originally proposed at the 1932 meeting of the Association of American Universities by Wallace Atwood, then president of Clark University. However, it was not until in 1967, with support from the Carnegie Corporation of New York, that Carnegie Mellon University began to offer the D.A. in Mathematics, History, English and Fine Arts, conferring the first such Doctor of Arts degrees in the United States the following year, in 1968, to Donald H. Taranto in the field of mathematics. Guiding principles for the Doctor of Arts degree were established in 1970 by the Committee on Graduate Studies of the American Association of State Colleges and Universities and by the Council of Graduate Schools in the United States. Additional support was provided by the Carnegie Foundation in 1971.

At its height, Doctor of Arts degrees were awarded at 31 institutions in the United States. The National Doctor of Arts Association (NDAA) was founded in 1991 at Idaho State University and held two national conferences.

As of 2026, the Doctor of Arts degree is awarded in English Pedagogy at Murray State University, which describes the degree as "more pedagogically focused than the PhD and more disciplinarily centered than the EdD." The degree is also offered in Music at Ball State University and in biology and political science at Idaho State University. There is also a DA in the Great Books of the Western World offered at Harrison Middleton University.

== See also ==
- Doctor of Fine Arts – typically an honorary degree
- Doctor of Liberal Arts
