= William Relling Jr. =

William Edward Relling Jr. (March 15, 1954 – January 22, 2004) was a St. Louis-born horror/mystery writer. He graduated from Lutheran High School North in 1971. He was a member of the Colin Sphinctor Band and in 1978 moved to Los Angeles with the band. When the band broke up, Relling chose to stay in Los Angeles, where he continued writing. Fellow writer Gary A. Braunbeck wrote of Relling's death by suicide in his 2010 book To Each Their Darkness.

== Select bibliography ==
- Brujo (December 1986) TOR Paperback (ISBN 0-812-52510-8)
- New Moon (October 1987) TOR Paperback (ISBN 0-812-525124)
- The Infinite Man: A Collection of 21 Stories (1989) Scream Press
- Silent Moon (March 1990) TOR Paperback (ISBN 0812507088)
- Deadly Vintage (1995) Walker & Co, Hardcover (ISBN 0-8027-3262-3)
- Sweet Poison (1998) Walker & Co. Hardcover (ISBN 0-8027-3316-6)
- Along the Midway of the Carnival of Souls, and Other Stories (Collection with Rick Hautala) (September 2002) Wildside Press H/C
- The Criminalist (November 2003) Leisure Paperback(ISBN 0-8439-5278-4)
