= The Common Review =

- Type: Quarterly literary journal
- Format: Magazine
- Owner: Great Books Foundation
- Editor: Daniel Born; Danny Postel
- Founded: Fall 2001
- Ceased publication: Fall/Winter 2011 (print)
- Headquarters: Chicago, Illinois; United States
- Website: thecommonreview.org

The Common Review was the literary magazine of the Great Books Foundation.

== History and profile ==
The Common Review was started as a quarterly publication in Fall 2001. The founder was the former Great Books Foundation president Peter Temes. The magazine specializes in nonfiction essays and articles "about the books and ideas that matter", as well as reviews of new books, letters, and editorials.

Daniel Born was the launching editor of the magazine. He served in the post until the Fall 2010 issue when Danny Postel was named new editor. Jason A. Smith was managing editor from 2001 until 2008, when he became editor of Wisconsin People & Ideas, the quarterly magazine of the Wisconsin Academy of Sciences, Arts & Letters. Some of the notable writers and poets featured in the magazine have included Gerald Graff, Nat Hentoff, Phillip Lopate, Joseph Epstein, Carl Rakosi, David Sloan Wilson, Julia Kasdorf, and Michael Bérubé.

The magazine was twice nominated for the Utne Independent Press Awards, in 2003 (Arts/Literary coverage), and in 2006 ("Best Writing"). The magazine ended the print quarterly edition with the Fall/Winter 2011 issue and went on online. Online publication has also ceased.
