= Henri Colson =

- Born: Henri Jean Colson; 21 April 1819; Ghent, United Kingdom of the Netherlands
- Died: 30 April 1900 (aged 81)
- Occupations: engineer, industrialist, professor, politician

Henri Jean Colson (21 April 1819 – 30 April 1900) was a Belgian engineer, industrialist, professor at the University of Ghent, alderman and burgomaster of Ghent (Belgium) (ad interim)

== Sources ==
- Devolder, K., Gij die door 't volk gekozen zijt ... De Gentse gemeenteraad en haar leden 1830–1914, in : Verhandelingen der Maatschappij voor Geschiedenis en Oudheidkunde te Gent, 1994, p. 264-265.
- Henri Colson (Liberaal Archief)

== See also ==
- List of mayors of Ghent
