= Eugène Colson =

Eugène Colson (Charleroi, 7.02.1913 - Antwerp, 2000), known by the alias "Harry", was a noted member of the Belgian Resistance during World War II. An employee of the port of Antwerp during the German occupation, Colson formed a resistance cell affiliated to the Nationale Koninklijke Beweging (NKB) group.

During the liberation of Belgium, Colson played an important role in preventing the German destruction of the important port of Antwerp. As a result, the Canadian troops which entered the city in September 1944 were able to capture the facility intact. Historian Frank Stappaert wrote Colson's memoirs down in: Kolonel Harry: Een getuigenis over de bevrijding van Antwerpen [Colonel Harry: A testimony about the liberation of Antwerp], Antwerp - Berchem: EPO, 1997.
