= Frederick Coulson =

English rugby league footballer

Fred Coulson
Personal information
- Full name: Frederick Coulson
- Born: Featherstone, England
- Died: unknown

Playing information
Club
Years	Team	Pld	T	G	FG	P
1935–37	Featherstone Rovers	48	2	1	0	8

Frederick "Fred" Coulson (birth unknown – death unknown) was a professional rugby league footballer who played in the 1930s. He played at club level for Featherstone Rovers.

== Playing career ==
Frederick Coulson made his début for Featherstone Rovers on Saturday 7 September 1935.
