= Edwin Campion Vaughan =

British military officer (1897–1931)

Edwin Campion Vaughan MC
- Born: 30 November 1897; Forest Gate, London, United Kingdom
- Died: 8 June 1931 (aged 33)
- Military career
- Allegiance: United Kingdom
- Branch: British Army
- Service years: 1914–1918
- Rank: Captain
- Unit: Royal Warwickshire Regiment
- Conflicts: World War I
- Awards: Military Cross
- Other work: Pilot in the Royal Air Force

Edwin Stephen Campion Vaughan MC (30 November 1897 – 8 June 1931) was a British Army officer in the First World War whose diary later became a well-known book.

== Early life ==
He was born at Forest Gate, Essex, one of the nine children of Patrick William Vaughan, an officer in HM Customs Office, and his wife née Lavinia Sowerby Campion. He was educated at the Jesuit College of St. Ignatius, Stamford Hill.

== First World War ==
In 1915, he joined the Artists Rifles Officers' Training Corps and was trained at Hare Hall camp, Gidea Park, Essex, at the same time as the poets Wilfred Owen and Edward Thomas, but there is no record of them having ever met. Vaughan was then commissioned into the Royal Warwickshire Regiment on 19 June 1916 as a second lieutenant and sailed for France in January 1917. A fellow officer named Syd Pepper, who had seen action during the Battle of the Somme in 1916, had convinced Vaughan to join the 1/8th battalion of the regiment and he acquired the sole remaining vacancy.

During the Battle of Passchendaele (also known as the Third Battle of Ypres) in August and September 1917 he kept a diary of his experiences with trench warfare. He was temporary captain of his Company for a very short time (a few hours) while his commanding officer was wounded, until a new company commander came up to the line. Vaughan was promoted to permanent rank of captain in October 1917 and he later fought in the Italian campaign. In 1918 he returned to France where as a result of his actions in capturing the a bridge over the Sambre Canal, Vaughan was decorated with the Military Cross.

== Post-war ==
After the war, he tried to settle down in a civilian life, without much success. In 1920 he transferred to a Territorial Army battalion of the Essex Regiment. In 1922 he was commissioned into the Royal Air Force, qualifying as a pilot. He achieved the rank of flight lieutenant in 1928, but retired due to ill health the following year. In 1926 he married Margaret Frances Southard of Devonport; they had four children. He died in the East Ham Memorial hospital in 1931, the victim of a doctor's error in the administration of drugs, accidentally given cocaine instead of procaine (Novocaine).

== Diary ==
After Vaughan's death in 1931, his brother kept the book until 1940 when he returned it to Edwin's wife believing that she would then be able to cope with the horrors described in the book. The diary was published in 1981. Writing in The Wall Street Journal in 2006, James J. Cramer cites Some Desperate Glory as one of the five best books on war:

Vaughan describes the screams of the wounded who had sought refuge in the freshly gouged holes only to find themselves slowly drowning as rain fell and the water level rose. A relentlessly stark account of the war's bloodiest, most futile battle.

Vaughan ended his diary on 28 August, reflecting on the futility of Ypres with:

So this was the end of 'D' Company. Feeling sick and lonely, I returned to my tent to write out my casualty report; but instead I sat on the floor and drank whisky after whisky as I gazed into a black and empty future.
