= Coulston =

Village in Wiltshire, England

Coordinates: 51.286°N 2.071°W

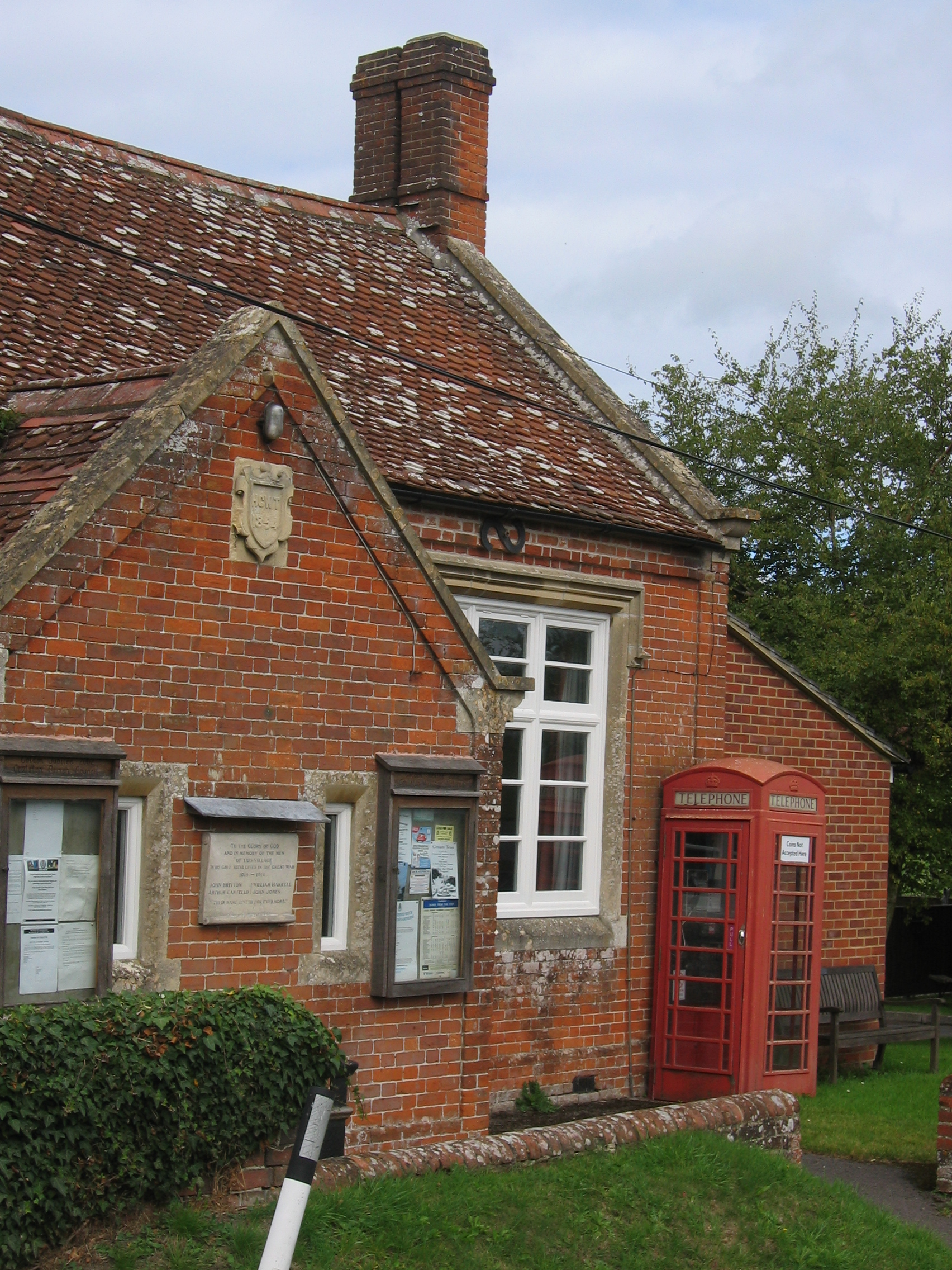
- Village hall

- Location within Wiltshire
- Population: 133 (in 2021)
- OS grid reference: ST951541
- Civil parish: Coulston
- Unitary authority: Wiltshire
- Ceremonial county: Wiltshire
- Region: South West
- Country: England
- Sovereign state: United Kingdom
- Post town: WESTBURY
- Postcode district: BA13
- Dialling code: 01380
- Police: Wiltshire
- Fire: Dorset and Wiltshire
- Ambulance: South Western
- UK Parliament: Melksham and Devizes
- Website: Parish Council

Coulston, formerly called East Coulston is a village and civil parish in Wiltshire, England, five miles northeast of the town of Westbury, just north of the B3098 road. The village lies under the north slope of Salisbury Plain and the parish extends south onto the Plain. In 2021 the parish had a population of 133.

The parish has an elected parish council called Coulston Parish Council.

Coulston has a mix of old and new houses, about sixty-five in all. The number of buildings listed as of architectural or historic importance is thirteen (all listed Grade II). There is no shop or surviving public house.

== History ==
The parish was originally called East Coulston, and until 1934 the theoretical hamlet of West Coulston (immediately adjacent to East Coulston and including the village school) was a part of a tithing of Edington parish, known as Baynton and Coulston. In that year East and West Coulston were united into a parish. On 16 February 1977 the parish was renamed from "East Coulston" to "Coulston".

A small school was built c. 1855 at West Coulston but was closed by 1899. The schoolroom is now the village hall, while the attached schoolmaster's house is a private residence.

The Stert and Westbury Railway was built by the Great Western Railway Company, running to the north of the village and opening in 1900. The nearest station was Edington and Bratton. The track continues in use as part of the Reading to Taunton Line but the station closed to passengers in 1952 and to goods in 1963.

== Notable buildings ==
Baynton House is an exquisite Georgian manor house rebuilt in the 1780s, set in extensive gardens. The house is next to the Coulston Deer Park, which has a herd of deer and is owned together with Baynton House.

Coulston House, a smaller manor house near the main settlement of the village, built in the late 18th century, was previously a farmhouse. A substantial farm courtyard close to Coulston House was converted into several houses in the late 20th century. One of these houses is called The Granary and was once a grain barn.

=== Church ===
The parish church has 12th-century Norman origins. In the Middle Ages, its dedication was to Saint Andrew, but since the early 19th century it has been to Saint Thomas of Canterbury. The chancel was built in the 14th century and rebuilt during restoration in 1868; the south side of the nave has a blocked 12th-century doorway, while the windows are from the 17th century.

The Wiltshire and Swindon Archives, in Chippenham, holds the parish registers of East Coulston for the following periods.

- Christenings: from 1714 to 1974
- Marriages: from 1714 to 1994
- Burials: from 1714 to 1992

The churchyard has the grave of Francis Savill Kent, murdered in 1860 when almost four years old at Road Hill (now in Somerset, then in Wiltshire). His half-sister Constance Kent confessed to the crime and was imprisoned; the case aroused press interest and inspired books and television dramatizations.

The parish is now part of the benefice of Bratton, Edington and Imber, Erlestoke, and Coulston.

== Pronunciation ==
The name of the village has been pronounced Cohlst'n at least since the late 19th century, and this is used by all long-term residents. The pronunciation Coolst'n is sometimes used by outsiders but locally is deemed to be incorrect.

== Notable people ==
- Mary Delany, formerly Mary Granville (1700–1788), a Bluestocking artist and writer, was born at Coulston.
- George Fuller of Neston Park (1833–1927), MP for Westbury, was born at Baynton.
- Elizabeth Godolphin, who founded Salisbury's Godolphin School, was baptised here in 1663.
- Donald Wright (1923–2012), schoolmaster, headmaster of Shrewsbury School, lived at Coulston in retirement.

== Images ==
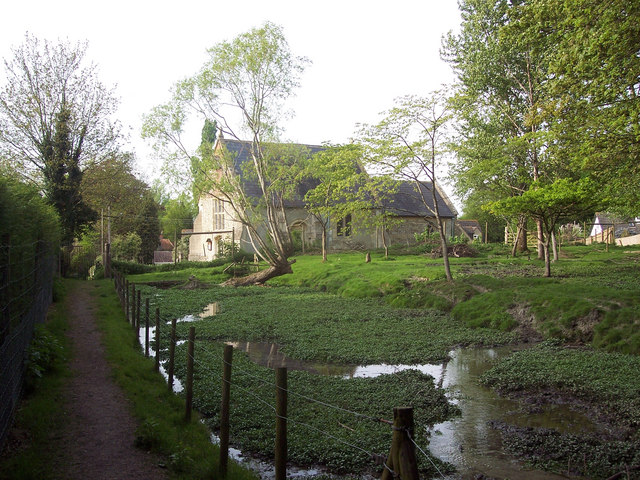
Disused watercress bed, dating from the 1950s, and parish church

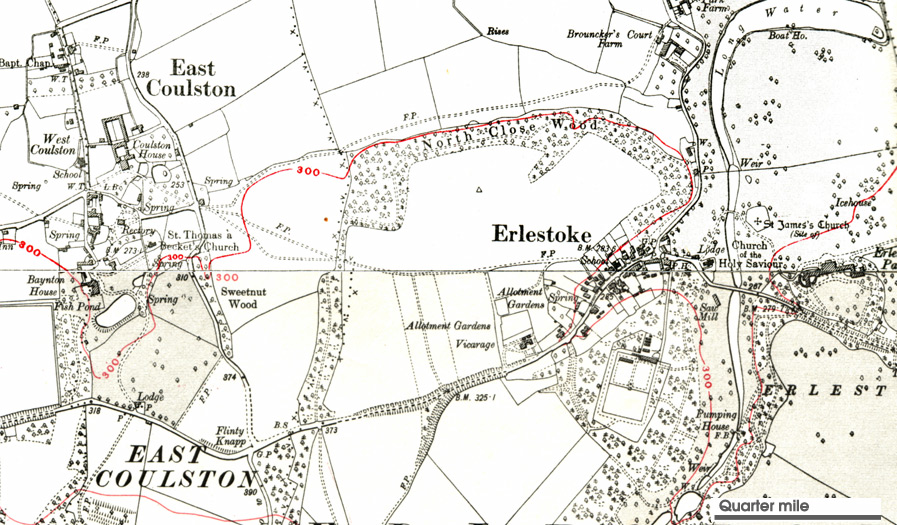
Local map, from 1922

== See also ==
- Coulston (surname)
