= Mark Coulson =

English footballer (born 1986)

Personal information
- Date of birth: 11 February 1986 (age 40)
- Place of birth: Huntingdon, England
- Positions: Defender; midfielder

Team information
- Current team: St Ives Town

Senior career*
Years	Team	Apps	(Gls)
2003–2005	Peterborough United	8	(0)
2007	Histon		
2007–2009	Hemel Hempstead Town	21	(0)
2009–2010	Biggleswade Town		
2010–2013	Bury Town	112	(1)
2013–2016	Biggleswade Town		
2016–2017	St Ives Town	16	(0)
2017–2018	Cambridge City	11	(0)
2018–	St Ives Town	33	(2)
- * Club domestic league appearances and goals as of 23:00, 3 January 2020 (UTC)

Mark Coulson (born 11 February 1986) is an English footballer who plays for Northern Premier League Division One Midlands side St Ives Town, where he plays as a defender.

== Playing career ==
=== Peterborough United ===
Coulson made his Football League debut for Peterborough United in the 5–0 defeat at Tranmere Rovers on 18 March 2005 replacing Ahmed Deen as a substitute.

He made eight league appearances for Peterborough, before signing for Histon in 2007. Later in the year he moved on to Hemel Hempstead Town. In 2009, he signed for Biggleswade Town.

=== Bury Town ===
In July 2010, Mark moved to Bury Town.

=== St Ives Town ===
Coulson signed for Southern League Premier Division Central side St Ives Town for the 2018–19 season.
