= Fred Colston =

American tennis player

Fred Campbell Colston
- Full name: Frederick Campbell Colston
- Country (sports): United States
- Born: January 25, 1884; Baltimore, Maryland, United States
- Died: November 19, 1918 (aged 34) near Verdun, France

Singles

Grand Slam singles results
- US Open: SF (1910)

Frederick Campbell Colston (January 25, 1884 – November 19, 1918) was an American tennis player active in the early 20th century.

Colston served as a captain in the 155st Field Artillery Brigade, 80th Division, American Expeditionary Forces during World War I. He died near Verdun, France eight days after the war ended. His is buried at the American Cemetery at Romagne-sous-Montfaucon, Lorraine, France.

== Career ==
Colston reached the semifinals of the U.S. National Championships in 1910.

=== Grand Slam tournament performance timeline ===
Key
W	F	SF	QF	#R	RR	Q#	DNQ	A	NH

(W) winner; (F) finalist; (SF) semifinalist; (QF) quarterfinalist; (#R) rounds 4, 3, 2, 1; (RR) round-robin stage; (Q#) qualification round; (DNQ) did not qualify; (A) absent; (NH) not held; (SR) strike rate (events won / competed); (W–L) win–loss record.

Tournament	1904	1905	1906	1907	1908	1909	1910	1911	1912	1913
Australian Open	NH	A	A	A	A	A	A	A	A	A
Wimbledon	A	A	A	A	A	A	A	A	A	A
US Open	1R	2R	2R	2R	A	4R	SF	A	Q1	1R
