= Leslie Coulson =

English journalist and First World War poet

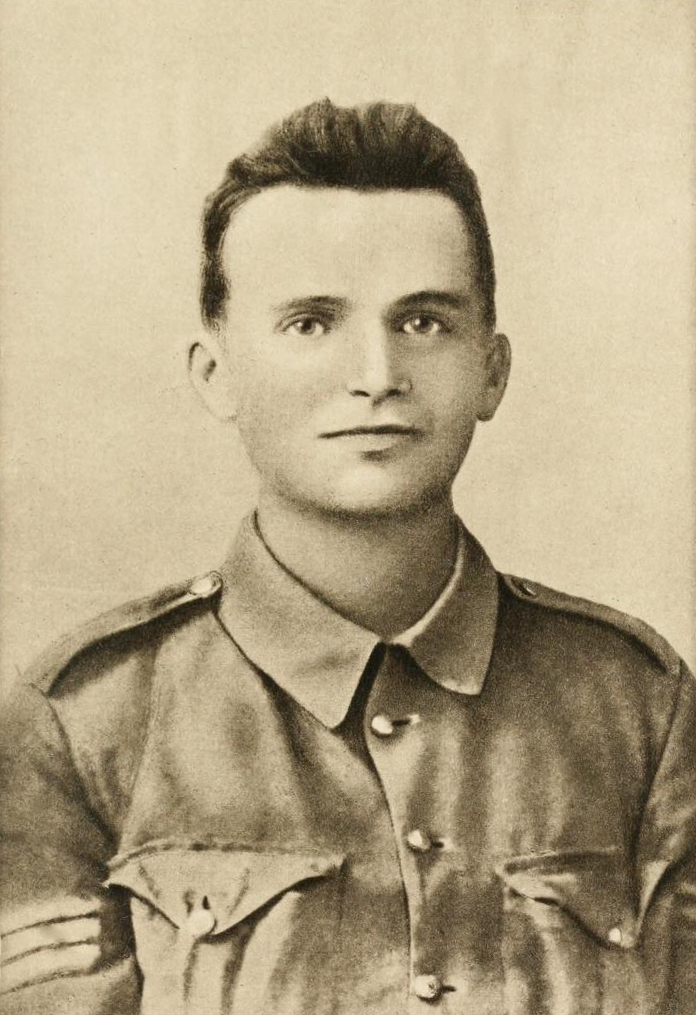
Leslie Coulson

Leslie Coulson (19 July 1889 – 8 October 1916) was an English journalist and a poet of the First World War.

Coulson was born in Kilburn, London, his father being a columnist for The Sunday Chronicle. Leslie and his brother attended boarding school in Norfolk, and Leslie then worked as a reporter on the Evening News. He joined the Royal Fusiliers in 1914, declining a commission as an officer and instead enlisting as a private. He carried out his training in Malta, then served in Egypt and Gallipoli before arriving at the Western Front in 1916.

Coulson was fatally wounded at the Battle of Le Transloy, and died the next day. He is buried at the Commonwealth War Graves Commission Grove Town Cemetery near the village of Méaulte. His collected poems were published posthumously in 1917, edited by his father, and sold 10,000 copies in the first year. The best known of the poems is "Who Made the Law?" It was one of the first poems to have questioned the need for the war, and Coulson had written it a few days before his death.
