= Willie Coulson =

English footballer

Personal information
- Full name: William John Coulson
- Date of birth: 14 January 1951 (age 75)
- Place of birth: Benwell, England
- Height: 5 ft 10 in (1.78 m)
- Position: Midfielder

Youth career
- Consett
- North Shields
- 1969–1970: Chelsea
- 1970–1971: Newcastle United

Senior career*
Years	Team	Apps	(Gls)
1971–1973	Newcastle United	0	(0)
1973–1976	Southend United	52	(4)
1975	→ Aldershot (loan)	3	
1975	→ Huddersfield Town (loan)	2	(0)
1976	→ Darlington (loan)	13	(1)
1976–1978	Hong Kong Rangers		
1978	Ringwood City	15	(2)
1979	Frankston City	14	(1)
1980	Hong Kong Rangers		
- * Club domestic league appearances and goals

William John Coulson (born 14 January 1951) is an English former professional footballer who played as a midfielder.

After a short stint at Chelsea, he played for Newcastle United's reserve team, before making a single appearance with the senior team in the second leg of the Texaco Cup semi-final against Derby County. He then joined Southend United, and also played on loan at Aldershot, Huddersfield Town and Darlington. He played for the Hong Kong Rangers for a number of years, later moving to Melbourne, where he spent two seasons in Victorian soccer, firstly with Ringwood City, and then with Frankston City. Coulson was involved in Frankston's Dockerty Cup run in 1979, but did not play in the final, which saw the club lose to Essedon Croatia in extra time. Afterwards, he returned to Hong Kong to play for the Rangers again. He organised a coaching clinic in Melbourne with George Best, Bobby Charlton and Denis Law, with whom he played a charity match, the last time he kicked a ball. He lived in Melbourne for 20 years, and then resided in Newcastle, New South Wales.
