= Chronological list of men's Grand Slam tennis champions =

Chronological list of men's Grand Slam tennis champions contains all winners of men's major tennis events, known as the Grand Slam tournaments, in chronological order.

== Winners ==
As of the 2026 Wimbledon Championships;

- 494 men's singles Grand Slam championships have been played since 1877.
- 154 different players have won a men's singles Grand Slam championship; they are listed here in order of their first win. Players in **bold** are still active.

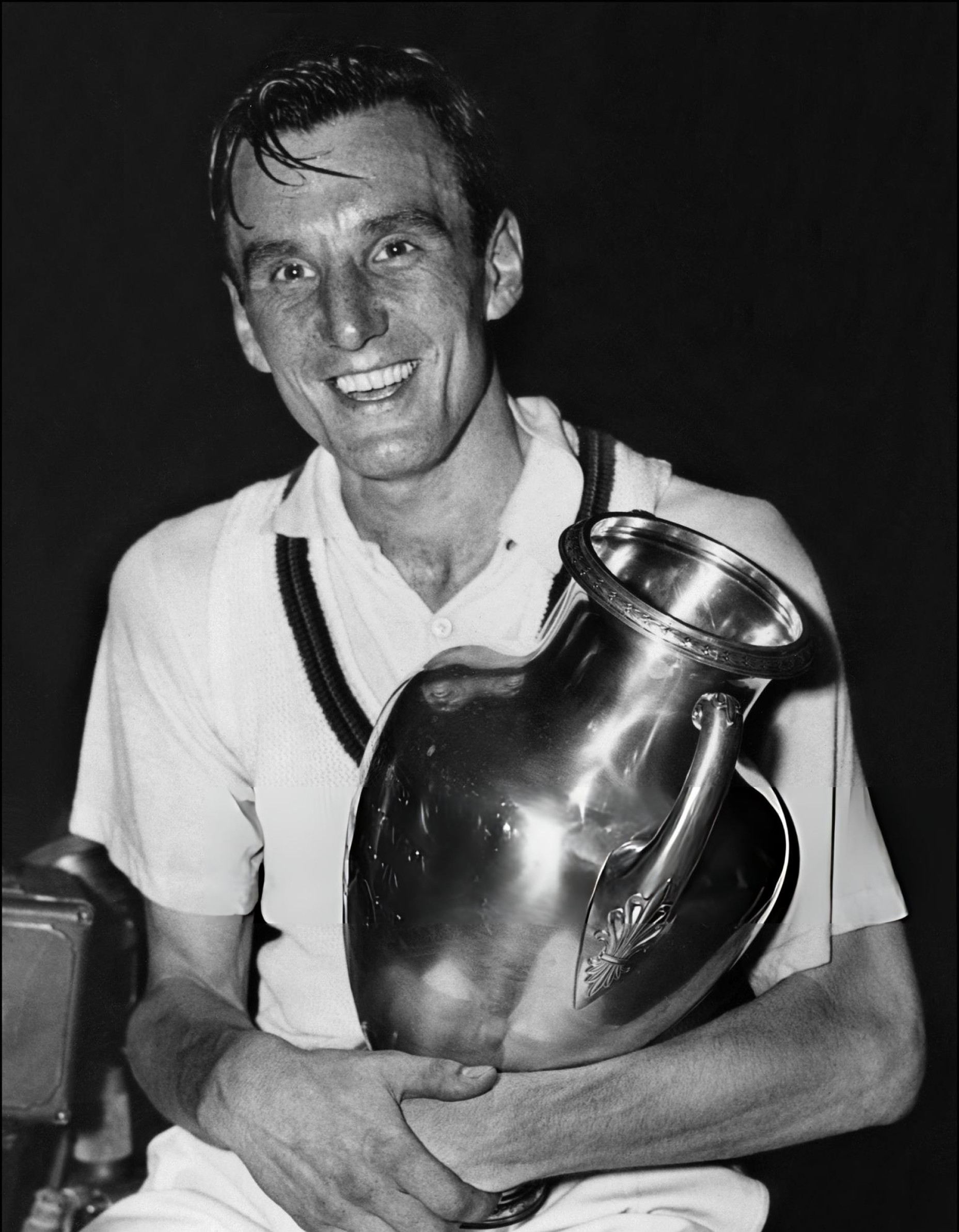
Fred Perry completed a career Grand Slam at the 1935 French Championships.

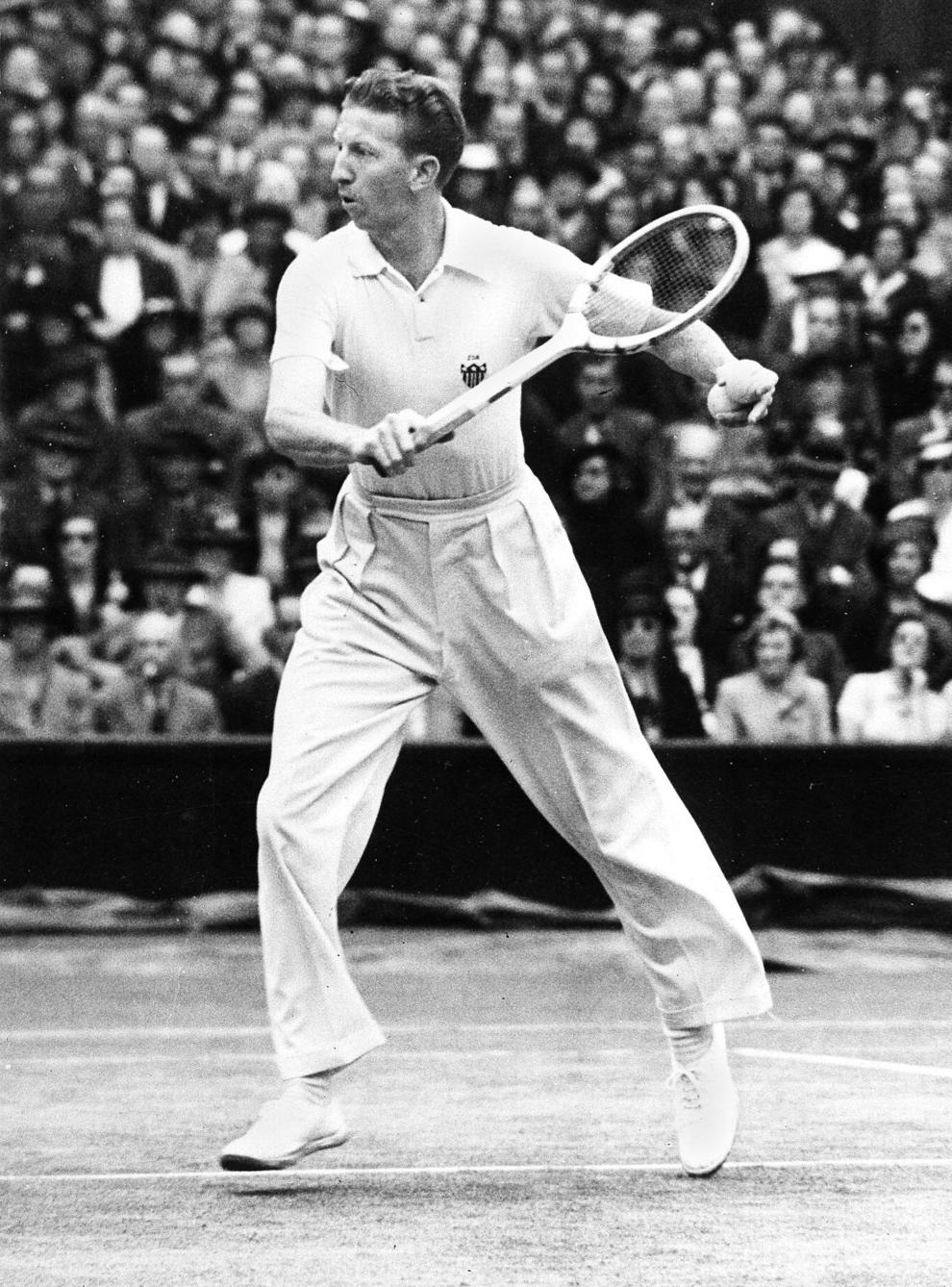
Don Budge completed a Grand Slam at the 1938 U.S. Championships.

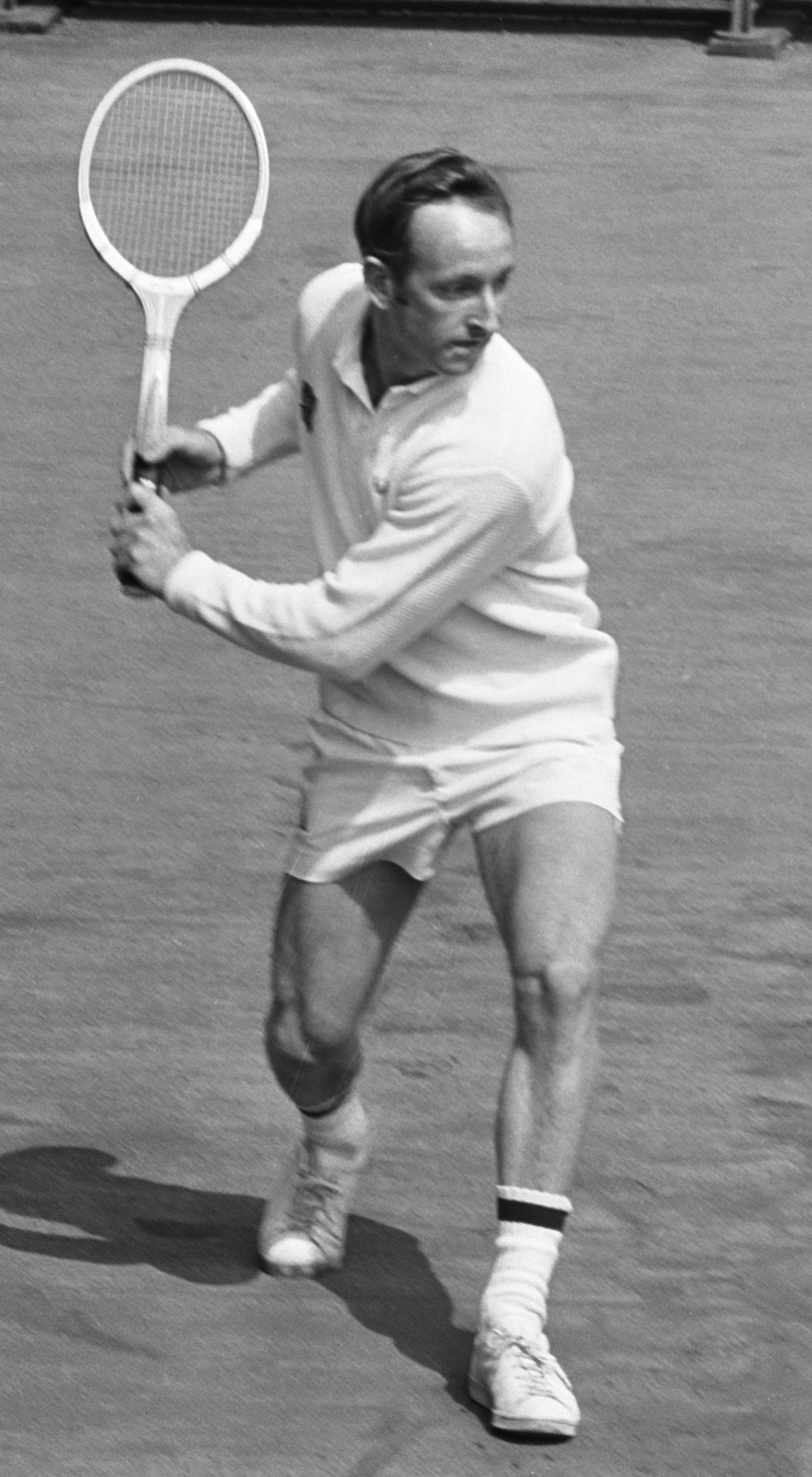
Rod Laver completed a Grand Slam at the 1962 U.S. Championships and the 1969 US Open.

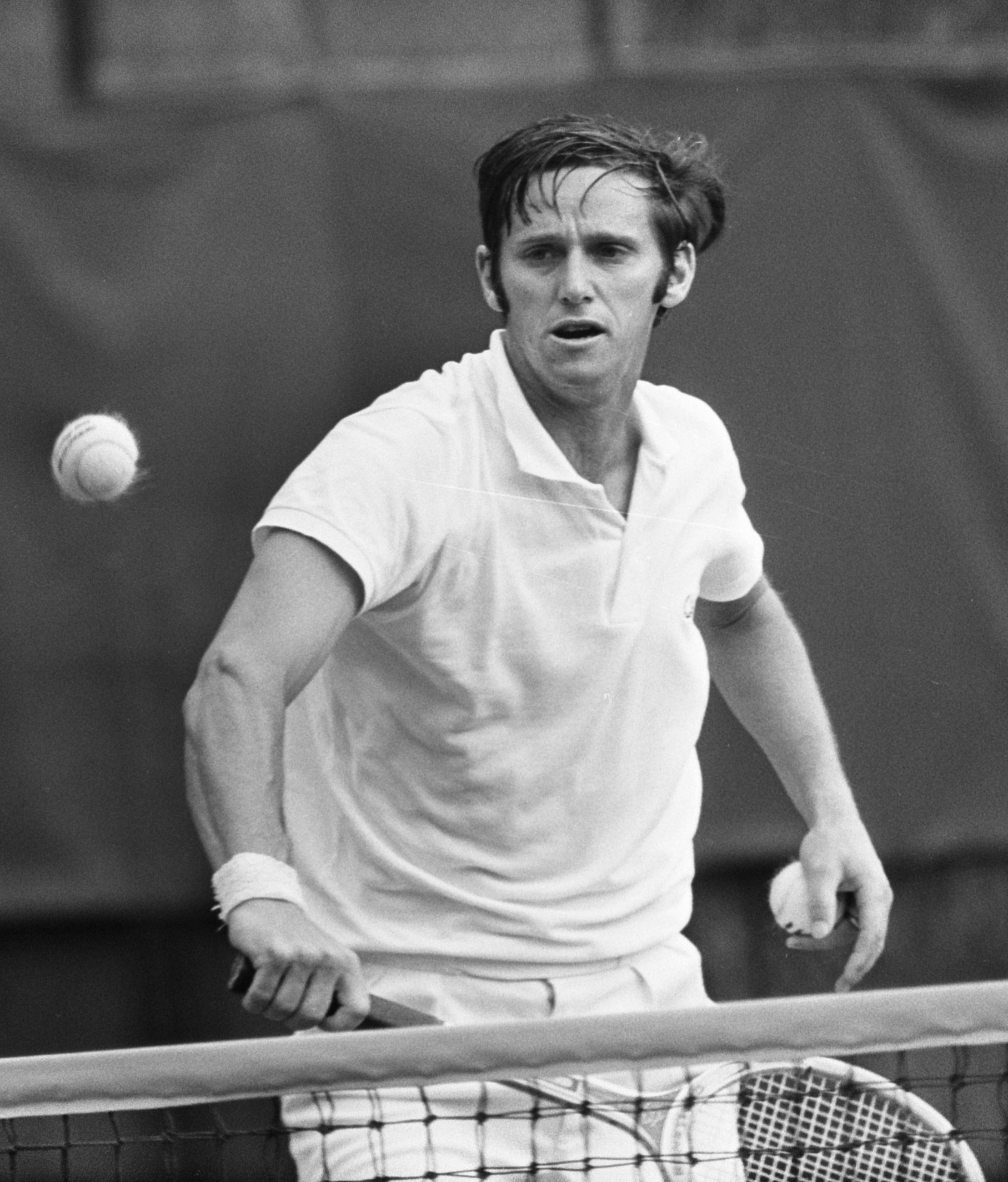
Roy Emerson completed a career Grand Slam at the 1964 Wimbledon and the 1967 French Championships.

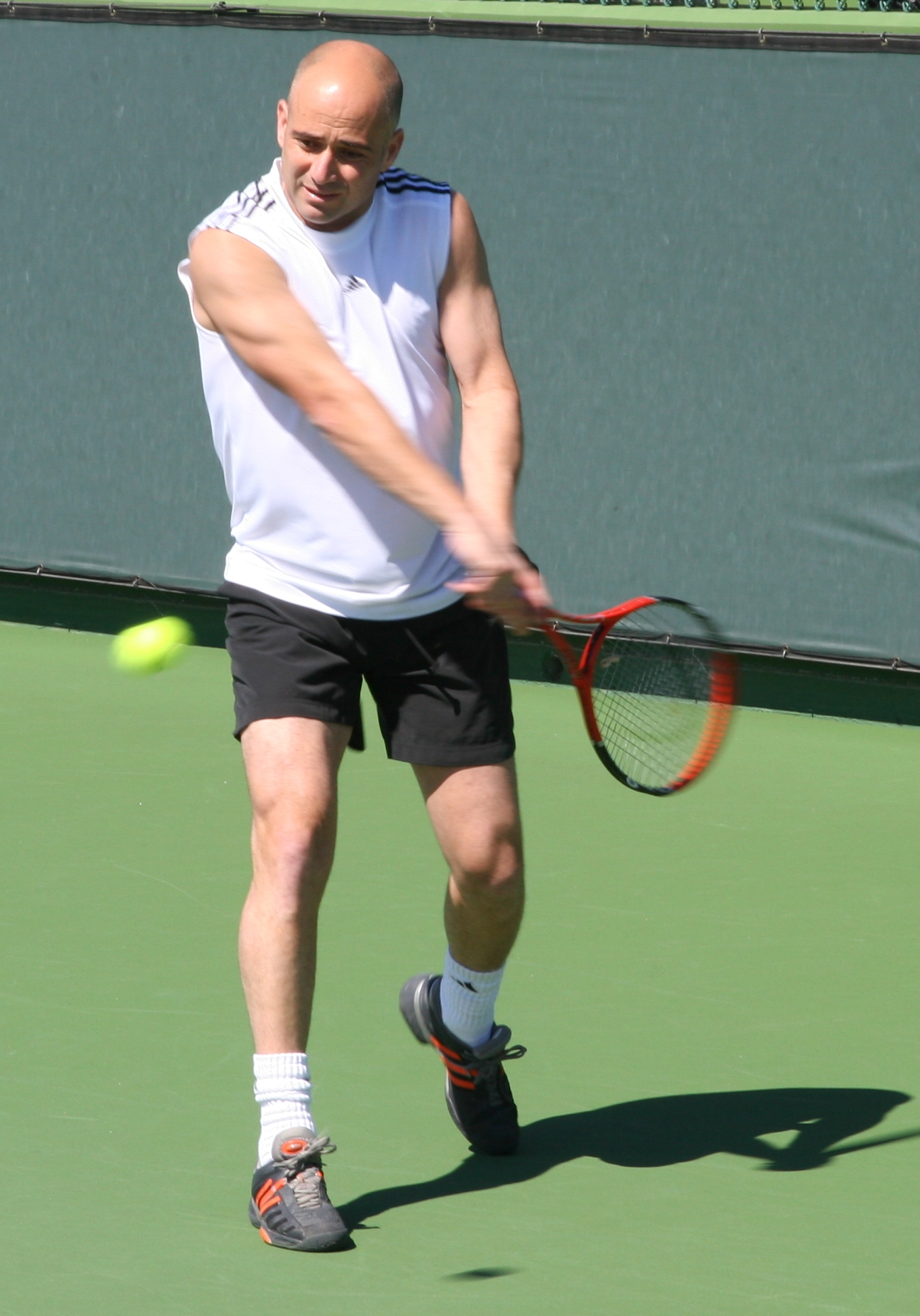
Andre Agassi completed a career Grand Slam at the 1999 French Open.

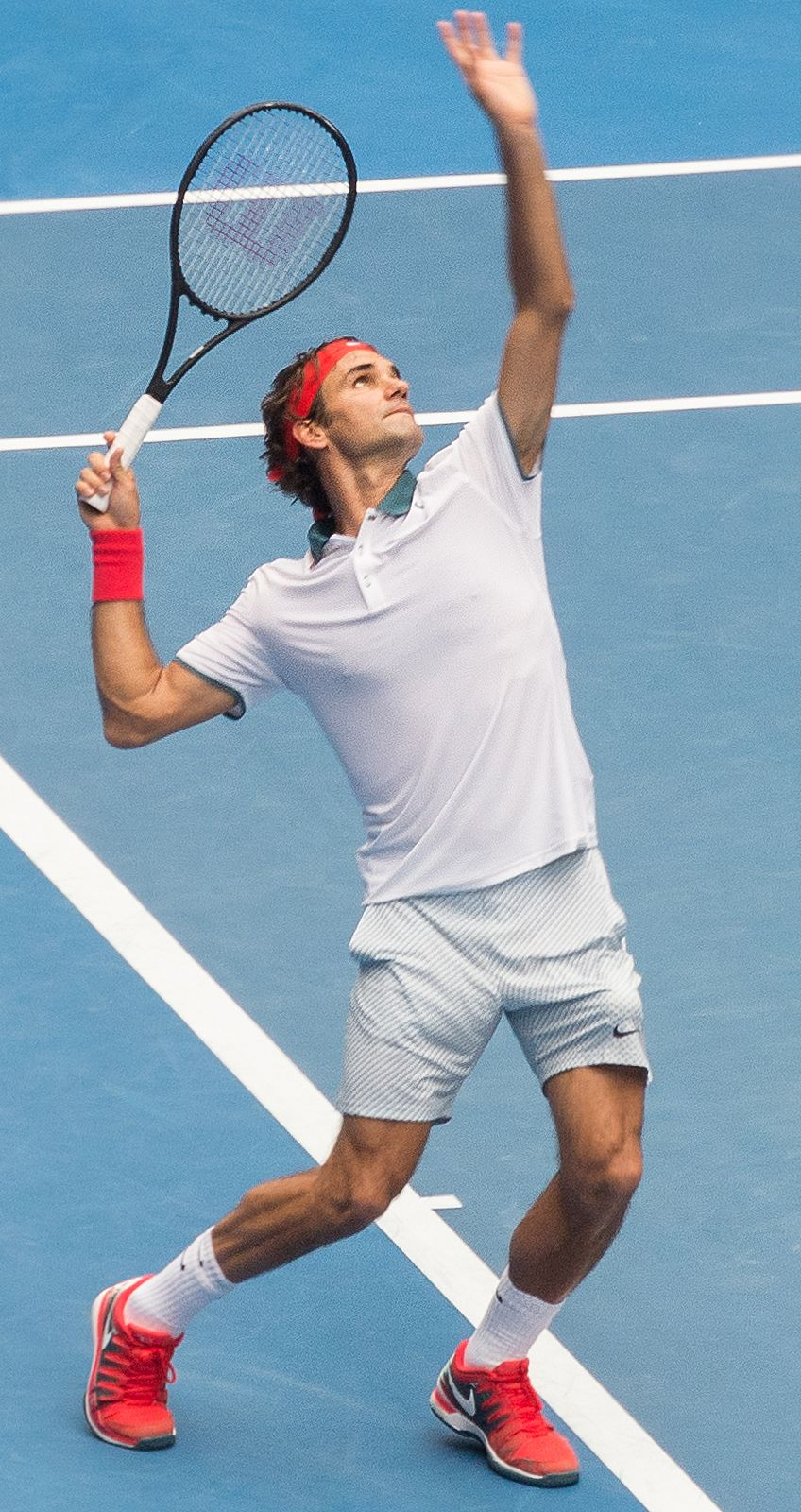
Roger Federer completed a career Grand Slam at the 2009 French Open.

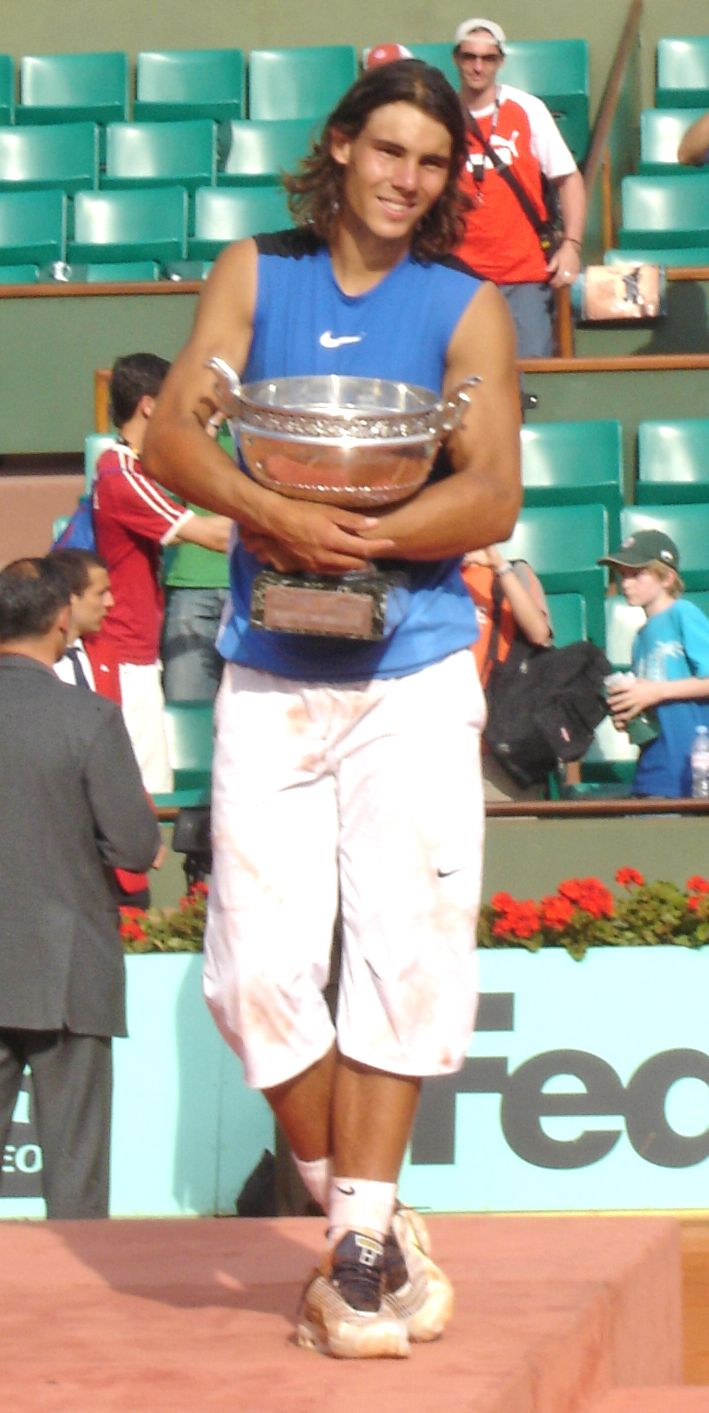
Rafael Nadal completed a career Grand Slam at the 2010 US Open and a double career Grand Slam at the 2022 Australian Open.

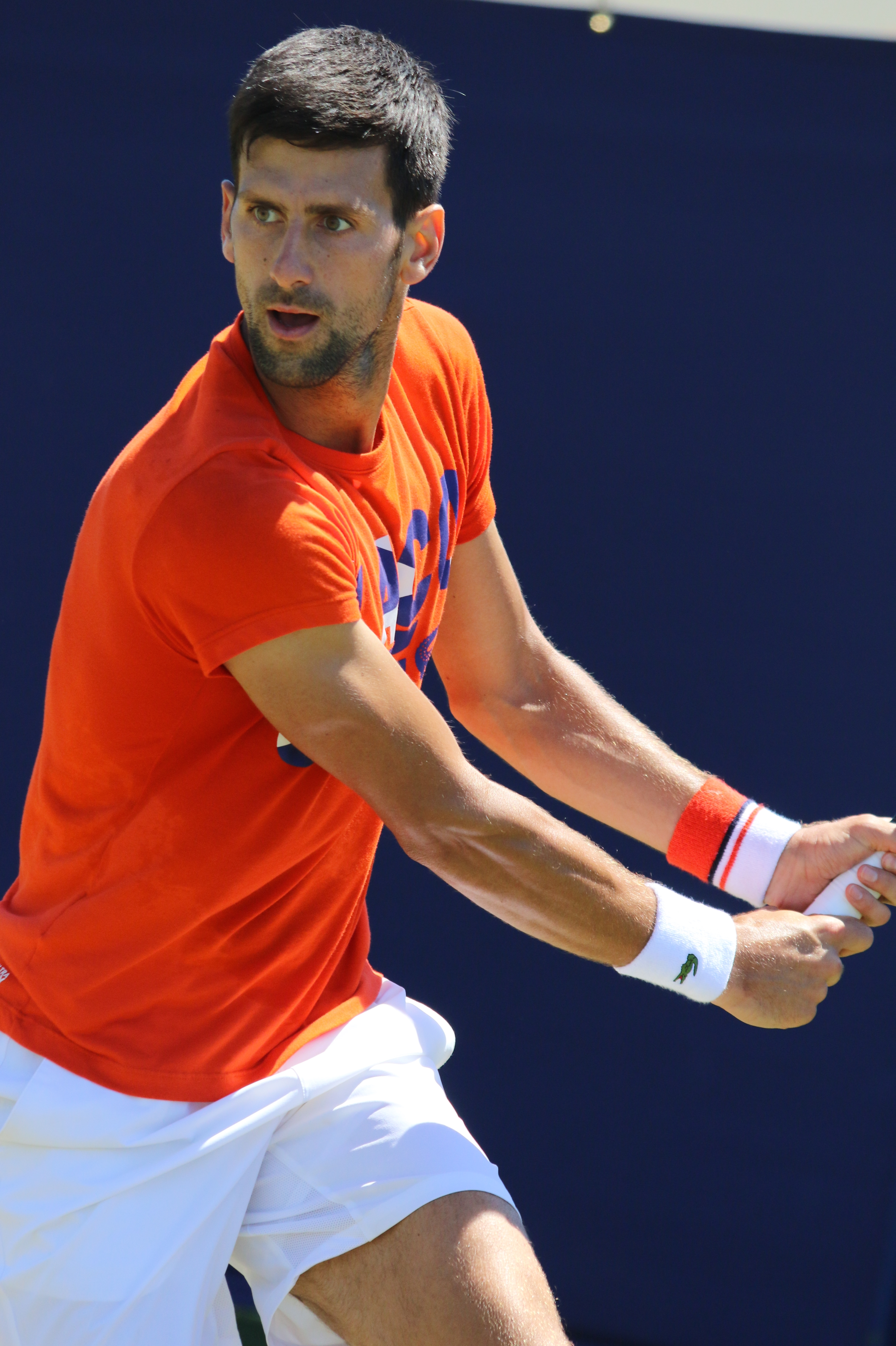
Novak Djokovic completed a non-calendar year Grand Slam at the 2016 French Open and a triple career Grand Slam at the 2023 French Open.

Key	Player completed a Grand Slam (event in bold)
Key	Player completed a non-calendar year Grand Slam (event in bold)
Key	Player completed a career Grand Slam (event in bold)

#	Champion	Year	First major	Majors	Australian Open	French Open	Wimbledon	US Open
1	(United Kingdom) Spencer Gore	1877	Wimbledon	1			1877	
2	(United Kingdom) Frank Hadow	1878	Wimbledon	1			1878	
3	(United Kingdom) John Hartley	1879	Wimbledon	2			1879, 1880	
4	(United Kingdom) William Renshaw	1881	Wimbledon	7			1881, 1882, 1883, 1884, 1885, 1886, 1889	
5	(United States) Richard Sears	1881	U.S. National Championships	7				1881, 1882, 1883, 1884, 1885, 1886, 1887
6	(United Kingdom) Herbert Lawford	1887	Wimbledon	1			1887	
7	(United Kingdom) Ernest Renshaw	1888	Wimbledon	1			1888	
8	(United States) Henry Slocum	1888	U.S. National Championships	2				1888, 1889
9	(United Kingdom) Willoughby Hamilton	1890	Wimbledon	1			1890	
10	(United States) Oliver Campbell	1890	U.S. National Championships	3				1890, 1891, 1892
11	(United Kingdom) Wilfred Baddeley	1891	Wimbledon	3			1891, 1892, 1895	
12	(United Kingdom) Joshua Pim	1893	Wimbledon	2			1893, 1894	
13	(United States) Robert Wrenn	1893	U.S. National Championships	4				1893, 1894, 1896, 1897
14	(United States) Fred Hovey	1895	U.S. National Championships	1				1895
15	(United Kingdom) Harold Mahony	1896	Wimbledon	1			1896	
16	(United Kingdom) Reginald Doherty	1897	Wimbledon	4			1897, 1898, 1899, 1900	
17	(United States) Malcolm Whitman	1898	U.S. National Championships	3				1898, 1899, 1900
18	(United Kingdom) Arthur Gore	1901	Wimbledon	3			1901, 1908, 1909	
19	(United States) William Larned	1901	U.S. National Championships	7				1901, 1902, 1907, 1908, 1909, 1910, 1911
20	(United Kingdom) Laurence Doherty	1902	Wimbledon	6			1902, 1903, 1904, 1905, 1906	1903
21	(United States) Holcombe Ward	1904	U.S. National Championships	1				1904
22	(United States) Beals Wright	1905	U.S. National Championships	1				1905
23	(Australia) Rodney Heath	1905	Australasian Championships	2	1905, 1910			
24	(United States) William Clothier	1906	U.S. National Championships	1				1906
25	(New Zealand) Anthony Wilding	1906	Australasian Championships	6	1906, 1909		1910, 1911, 1912, 1913	
26	(Australia) Norman Brookes	1907	Wimbledon	3	1911		1907, 1914	
27	(Australia) Horace Rice	1907	Australasian Championships	1	1907			
28	(United States) Fred Alexander	1908	Australasian Championships	1	1908			
29	(United States) Maurice McLoughlin	1912	U.S. National Championships	2				1912, 1913
30	(United Kingdom) James Cecil Parke	1912	Australasian Championships	1	1912			
31	(Australia) Ernie Parker	1913	Australasian Championships	1	1913			
32	(United States) R. Norris Williams	1914	U.S. National Championships	2				1914, 1916
33	(Australia) Arthur O'Hara Wood	1914	Australasian Championships	1	1914			
34	(United Kingdom) Gordon Lowe	1915	Australasian Championships	1	1915			
35	(United States) Bill Johnston	1915	U.S. National Championships	3			1923	1915, 1919
36	(United States) Robert Lindley Murray	1917	U.S. National Championships	2				1917, 1918
37	(Australia) Gerald Patterson	1919	Wimbledon	3	1927		1919, 1922	
38	(United Kingdom) Algernon Kingscote	1919	Australasian Championships	1	1919			
39	(Australia) Pat O'Hara Wood	1920	Australasian Championships	2	1920, 1923			
40	(United States) Bill Tilden	1920	Wimbledon	10			1920, 1921, 1930	1920, 1921, 1922, 1923, 1924, 1925, 1929
41	(Australia) Rhys Gemmell	1921	Australasian Championships	1	1921			
42	(Australia) James Anderson	1922	Australasian Championships	3	1922, 1924, 1925			
43	(France) Jean Borotra	1924	Wimbledon	4	1928	1931	1924, 1926	
44	(France) René Lacoste	1925	French Championships	7		1925, 1927, 1929	1925, 1928	1926, 1927
45	(Australia) John Hawkes	1926	Australasian Championships	1	1926			
46	(France) Henri Cochet	1926	French Championships	7		1926, 1928, 1930, 1932	1927, 1929	1928
47	(United Kingdom) John Colin Gregory	1929	Australian Championships	1	1929			
48	(Australia) Edgar Moon	1930	Australian Championships	1	1930			
49	(United States) John Doeg	1930	U.S. National Championships	1				1930
50	(Australia) Jack Crawford	1931	Australian Championships	6	1931, 1932, 1933, 1935	1933	1933	
51	(United States) Sidney Wood	1931	Wimbledon	1			1931	
52	(United States) Ellsworth Vines	1931	U.S. National Championships	3			1932	1931, 1932
53	(United Kingdom) Fred Perry	1933	U.S. National Championships	8	1934	**1935**	1934, 1935, 1936	1933, 1934, 1936
54	(Germany) Gottfried von Cramm	1934	French Championships	2		1934, 1936		
55	(United States) Wilmer Allison	1935	U.S. National Championships	1				1935
56	(Australia) Adrian Quist	1936	Australian Championships	3	1936, 1940, 1948			
57	(Australia) Vivian McGrath	1937	Australian Championships	1	1937			
58	(Germany) Henner Henkel	1937	French Championships	1		1937		
59	(United States) Don Budge	1937	Wimbledon	6	1938	1938	1937, 1938	1937, **1938**
60	(Australia) John Bromwich	1939	Australian Championships	2	1939, 1946			
61	(United States) Don McNeill	1939	French Championships	2		1939		1940
62	(United States) Bobby Riggs	1939	Wimbledon	3			1939	1939, 1941
63	(United States) Ted Schroeder	1942	U.S. National Championships	2			1949	1942
64	(United States) Joseph Hunt	1943	U.S. National Championships	1				1943
65	(United States) Frank Parker	1944	U.S. National Championships	4		1948, 1949		1944, 1945
66	(France) Marcel Bernard	1946	French Championships	1		1946		
67	(France) Yvon Petra	1946	Wimbledon	1			1946	
68	(United States) Jack Kramer	1946	U.S. National Championships	3			1947	1946, 1947
69	(Australia) Dinny Pails	1947	Australian Championships	1	1947			
70	(Hungary) József Asbóth	1947	French Championships	1		1947		
71	(United States) Bob Falkenburg	1948	Wimbledon	1			1948	
72	(United States) Pancho Gonzales	1948	U.S. National Championships	2				1948, 1949
73	(Australia) Frank Sedgman	1949	Australian Championships	5	1949, 1950		1952	1951, 1952
74	(United States) Budge Patty	1950	French Championships	2		1950	1950	
75	(United States) Arthur Larsen	1950	U.S. National Championships	1				1950
76	(United States) Dick Savitt	1951	Australian Championships	2	1951		1951	
77	(Egypt) Jaroslav Drobný	1951	French Championships	3		1951, 1952	1954	
78	(Australia) Ken McGregor	1952	Australian Championships	1	1952			
79	(Australia) Ken Rosewall	1953	Australian Championships	8	1953, 1955, 1971, 1972	1953, 1968		1956, 1970
80	(United States) Vic Seixas	1953	Wimbledon	2			1953	1954
81	(United States) Tony Trabert	1953	U.S. National Championships	5		1954, 1955	1955	1953, 1955
82	(Australia) Mervyn Rose	1954	Australian Championships	2	1954	1958		
83	(Australia) Lew Hoad	1956	Australian Championships	4	1956	1956	1956, 1957	
84	(Australia) Ashley Cooper	1957	Australian Championships	4	1957, 1958		1958	1958
85	(Sweden) Sven Davidson	1957	French Championships	1		1957		
86	(Australia) Mal Anderson	1957	U.S. National Championships	1				1957
87	(United States) Alex Olmedo	1959	Australian Championships	2	1959		1959	
88	(Italy) Nicola Pietrangeli	1959	French Championships	2		1959, 1960		
89	(Australia) Neale Fraser	1959	U.S. National Championships	3			1960	1959, 1960
90	(Australia) Rod Laver	1960	Australian Championships	11	1960, 1962, 1969	1962, 1969	1961, 1962, 1968, 1969	**1962**, **1969**
91	(Australia) Roy Emerson	1961	Australian Championships	12	1961, 1963, 1964, 1965, 1966, 1967	1963, **1967**	**1964**, 1965	1961, 1964
92	(Spain) Manuel Santana	1961	French Championships	4		1961, 1964	1966	1965
93	(United States) Chuck McKinley	1963	Wimbledon	1			1963	
94	(Mexico) Rafael Osuna	1963	U.S. National Championships	1				1963
95	(Australia) Fred Stolle	1965	French Championships	2		1965		1966
96	(Australia) Tony Roche	1966	French Championships	1		1966		
97	(Australia) John Newcombe	1967	Wimbledon	7	1973, 1975		1967, 1970, 1971	1967, 1973
98	(Australia) Bill Bowrey	1968	Australian Championships	1	1968			
99	(United States) Arthur Ashe	1968	US Open	3	1970		1975	1968
100	(Czechoslovakia) Jan Kodeš	1970	French Open	3		1970, 1971	1973	
101	(United States) Stan Smith	1971	US Open	2			1972	1971
102	(Romania) Ilie Năstase	1972	US Open	2		1973		1972
103	(Spain) Andrés Gimeno	1972	French Open	1		1972		
104	(United States) Jimmy Connors	1974	Australian Open	8	1974		1974, 1982	1974, 1976, 1978, 1982, 1983
105	(Sweden) Björn Borg	1974	French Open	11		1974, 1975, 1978, 1979, 1980, 1981	1976, 1977, 1978, 1979, 1980	
106	(Spain) Manuel Orantes	1975	US Open	1				1975
107	(Australia) Mark Edmondson	1976	Australian Open	1	1976			
108	(Italy) Adriano Panatta	1976	French Open	1		1976		
109	(United States) Roscoe Tanner	1977	Australian Open	1	1977^{(Jan)}			
110	(Argentina) Guillermo Vilas	1977	French Open	4	1978, 1979	1977		1977
111	(United States) Vitas Gerulaitis	1977	Australian Open	1	1977^{(Dec)}			
112	(United States) John McEnroe	1979	US Open	7			1981, 1983, 1984	1979, 1980, 1981, 1984
113	(United States) Brian Teacher	1980	Australian Open	1	1980			
114	(South Africa) / (United States) Johan Kriek	1981	Australian Open	2	1981, 1982			
115	(Sweden) Mats Wilander	1982	French Open	7	1983, 1984, 1988	1982, 1985, 1988		1988
116	(France) Yannick Noah	1983	French Open	1		1983		
117	(Czechoslovakia) Ivan Lendl	1984	French Open	8	1989, 1990	1984, 1986, 1987		1985, 1986, 1987
118	(Germany) Boris Becker	1985	Wimbledon	6	1991, 1996		1985, 1986, 1989	1989
119	(Sweden) Stefan Edberg	1985	Australian Open	6	1985, 1987		1988, 1990	1991, 1992
120	(Australia) Pat Cash	1987	Wimbledon	1			1987	
121	(United States) Michael Chang	1989	French Open	1		1989		
122	(Ecuador) Andrés Gómez	1990	French Open	1		1990		
123	(United States) Pete Sampras	1990	US Open	14	1994, 1997		1993, 1994, 1995, 1997, 1998, 1999, 2000	1990, 1993, 1995, 1996, 2002
124	(United States) Jim Courier	1991	French Open	4	1992, 1993	1991, 1992		
125	(Germany) Michael Stich	1991	Wimbledon	1			1991	
126	(United States) Andre Agassi	1992	Wimbledon	8	1995, 2000, 2001, 2003	**1999**	1992	1994, 1999
127	(Spain) Sergi Bruguera	1993	French Open	2		1993, 1994		
128	(Austria) Thomas Muster	1995	French Open	1		1995		
129	(Russia) Yevgeny Kafelnikov	1996	French Open	2	1999	1996		
130	(Netherlands) Richard Krajicek	1996	Wimbledon	1			1996	
131	(Brazil) Gustavo Kuerten	1997	French Open	3		1997, 2000, 2001		
132	(Australia) Patrick Rafter	1997	US Open	2				1997, 1998
133	(Czech Republic) Petr Korda	1998	Australian Open	1	1998			
134	(Spain) Carlos Moyá	1998	French Open	1		1998		
135	(Russia) Marat Safin	2000	US Open	2	2005			2000
136	(Croatia) Goran Ivanišević	2001	Wimbledon	1			2001	
137	(Australia) Lleyton Hewitt	2001	US Open	2			2002	2001
138	(Sweden) Thomas Johansson	2002	Australian Open	1	2002			
139	(Spain) Albert Costa	2002	French Open	1		2002		
140	(Spain) Juan Carlos Ferrero	2003	French Open	1		2003		
141	(Switzerland) Roger Federer	2003	Wimbledon	20	2004, 2006, 2007, 2010, 2017, 2018	**2009**	2003, 2004, 2005, 2006, 2007, 2009, 2012, 2017	2004, 2005, 2006, 2007, 2008
142	(United States) Andy Roddick	2003	US Open	1				2003
143	(Argentina) Gastón Gaudio	2004	French Open	1		2004		
144	(Spain) Rafael Nadal	2005	French Open	22	2009, **2022**	2005, 2006, 2007, 2008, 2010, 2011, 2012, 2013, 2014, 2017, 2018, 2019, 2020, 2022	2008, 2010	**2010**, 2013, 2017, 2019
145	(Serbia) **Novak Djokovic**	2008	Australian Open	**24**	2008, 2011, 2012, 2013, 2015, 2016, 2019, 2020, 2021, 2023	**2016**, **2021**, **2023**	2011, 2014, 2015, 2018, 2019, 2021, 2022	2011, 2015, 2018, 2023
146	(Argentina) Juan Martín del Potro	2009	US Open	1				2009
147	(United Kingdom) Andy Murray	2012	US Open	3			2013, 2016	2012
148	(Switzerland) **Stan Wawrinka**	2014	Australian Open	3	2014	2015		2016
149	(Croatia) **Marin Čilić**	2014	US Open	1				2014
150	(Austria) Dominic Thiem	2020	US Open	1				2020
151	(Russia) **Daniil Medvedev**	2021	US Open	1				2021
152	(Spain) **Carlos Alcaraz**	2022	US Open	7	**2026**	2024, 2025	2023, 2024	2022, 2025
153	(Italy) **Jannik Sinner**	2024	Australian Open	5	2024, 2025		2025, 2026	2024
154	(Germany) **Alexander Zverev**	2026	French Open	2		2026		2026
Winners	Events			Majors	Australian Open	French Open	Wimbledon	U.S. Open
154	Totals			494	114	96	139	145

== See also ==
- List of Grand Slam men's singles champions
- Chronological list of women's Grand Slam tennis champions
- List of Grand Slam men's singles finals
- Major professional tennis tournaments before the Open Era
- List of ATP Big Titles singles champions
