= 1904 U.S. National Championships – Men's singles =

Men's singles
- 1904 U.S. National Championships

Final
- Champion: (United States) Holcombe Ward
- Runner-up: (United Kingdom) Laurence Doherty
- Score: walkover

Events
Singles	men	women
Doubles	men	women
← 1903 ·	U.S. National Championships	· 1905 →

Holcombe Ward defeated William Clothier in the all comers' final, 10–8, 6–4, 9–7 to win the men's singles tennis title at the 1904 U.S. National Championships. Reigning champion Laurence Doherty did not defend his title in the Challenge Round. The event was held at the Newport Casino in Newport, R.I., United States.

== Draw ==
=== Challenge round ===
Challenge Round
(United Kingdom) Laurence Doherty
(United States) Holcombe Ward	w/o

=== All Comers' finals ===
Quarterfinals
(United States) Beals Wright	6	6	6
(United States) William Larned	1	0	3
(United States) Alphonzo Bell	3	5	3
(United States) William Clothier	6	7	6
(United States) Fred Alexander	4	7	5
(United States) Holcombe Ward	6	9	7
(United States) Edgar Leonard	6	6	6
(United States) Nathaniel Niles	0	1	1

Semifinals
(United States) William Larned	4	6	6	2	3
(United States) William Clothier	6	3	2	6	6
(United States) Holcombe Ward	6	6	6
(United States) Edgar Leonard	3	4	4

Finals
(United States) William Clothier	8	4	7
(United States) Holcombe Ward	10	6	9

=== Earlier rounds ===
==== Section 1 ====
First round

Second round
(United States) GA Phelps	1	1	3
(United States) BC Wright	6	6	6
(United States) P Fosdick
(United States) RN Dana	w/o
(United States) M Wright	6	6	6
(United States) PA Carroll	1	3	4
(United States) FJ Sulloway	w/o
(United States) EB Lambert

Third round
(United States) BC Wright	1	6	6	6
(United States) RN Dana	6	2	3	3
(United States) M Wright	6	1	3	2
(United States) FJ Sulloway	2	6	6	6

Fourth round
(United States) BC Wright	6	6	4	6
(United States) FJ Sulloway	2	2	6	1

==== Section 2 ====
First round

Second round
(United States) R Stevens	6	6	6
BBV Lyon	4	0	2
(United States) R Hickox	0	1	1
GW Lee	6	6	6
WJ Hull	0	2	1
CF Watson Jr.	6	6	6
(United States) JDE Jones	2	0	6	1
(United States) W Larned	6	6	3	6

Third round
(United States) R Stevens	6	6	6
GW Lee	1	1	2
CF Watson Jr.	1	5	r
(United States) W Larned	6	7

Fourth round
(United States) R Stevens	3	1	2
(United States) W Larned	6	6	6

==== Section 3 ====
First round
(United States) A Bell	6	5	6	8
(United States) FC Colston	2	7	4	6
(United States) GH Nettleton	7	6	6
(United States) GA Lyon Jr.	5	1	4

Second round
(United States) William Keene
JB Read	w/o
(United States) M Chace
(United States) JF Brice	w/o
(United States) G Baker	3	0	0
(United States) WP Burden	6	6	6
(United States) A Bell	6	6	6
(United States) GH Nettleton	3	2	3

Third round
JB Read	6	6	6
(United States) JF Brice	1	1	2
(United States) WP Burden	3	1	4
(United States) A Bell	6	6	6

Fourth round
JB Read	5	1	3
(United States) A Bell	7	6	6

==== Section 4 ====
First round
(United States) HF Allen	3	6	6	6
(United States) G Beals	6	3	0	3
(United States) W Clothier	6	6	6
(United States) CE Sands	4	2	0
(Australia) E Dewhurst	6	6	6
HR Sedgwick	1	1	2
(United States) GC Hinckley	2	6	6	6
(United States) HA Sands	6	1	4	1
SC Whipple	6	8	6
(United States) EW Catlin	1	6	4
TM Phetteplace	w/o
(United States) FR Tucker
(United States) OL Mills	w/o
FJ Otis
(United States) K Behr	6	7	9
AL Hoskins	2	5	7

Second round
(United States) HF Allen	4	1	4
(United States) W Clothier	6	6	6
(Australia) E Dewhurst	6	6	6	6
(United States) GC Hinckley	2	8	1	1
SC Whipple	6	6	4	6
TM Phetteplace	2	3	6	1
(United States) OL Mills
(United States) K Behr	w/o

Third round
(United States) W Clothier	6	7	6
(Australia) E Dewhurst	1	5	4
SC Whipple	1	0	2
(United States) K Behr	6	6	6

Fourth round
(United States) W Clothier	5	6	6	6
(United States) K Behr	7	2	2	3

==== Section 5 ====
First round
(United States) F Huntington	w/o
HH Whitman
(United States) ET Cross	6	6	6
JSA Johnson	0	3	0
HW Warner	w/o
(United States) H Brown
(United States) F Anderson	6	6	6
(United States) J Forbes	1	1	4
(United States) LC Ledyard	6	6	7
JW Burden	2	4	5
(United States) S Millett	6	6	6
(United States) CR Budlong	0	1	1
(United States) RA Thomas	w/o
(United States) K Horton
(United States) F Alexander	6	6	6
(United States) DF Appleton	1	0	3

Second round
(United States) F Huntington	6	6	6
(United States) ET Cross	0	2	3
HW Warner	4	2	0
(United States) F Anderson	6	6	6
(United States) LC Ledyard	0	3	1
(United States) S Millett	6	6	6
(United States) RA Thomas	0	1	1
(United States) F Alexander	6	6	6

Third round
(United States) F Huntington	6	4	6	6
(United States) F Anderson	4	6	4	3
(United States) S Millett	1	3	3
(United States) F Alexander	6	6	6

Fourth round
(United States) F Huntington	5	1	6
(United States) F Alexander	7	6	3

==== Section 6 ====
First round
(United States) H Ward	6	6	6
CS Brigham	4	1	1

Second round
(United States) H Ward	6	6	6
(United States) H Holt	3	3	1
(United States) W Johnson	w/o
(United States) H Avery
(United States) RD Little	6	6	5	8
(United States) B Brentice	1	4	7	6
JO Ames	3	3	5
(United States) K Collins	6	6	7

Third round
(United States) H Ward	6	6	6
(United States) W Johnson	4	3	4
(United States) RD Little	11	6	6	4	3
(United States) K Collins	13	3	2	6	6

Fourth round
(United States) H Ward	6	8	6
(United States) K Collins	2	6	2

==== Section 7 ====
First round

Second round
(United States) HG Dering	5	4	3
(United States) GT Adee	7	6	6
(United States) CM Bull	w/o
(United Kingdom) SH Smith
(United States) EW Leonard	w/o
(United States) A Codman
(United States) GT Scott
(United States) R Leroy	w/o

Third round
(United States) GT Adee	6	5	6	4	2
(United States) CM Bull	1	7	4	6	6
(United States) EW Leonard	6	7	10
(United States) R Leroy	2	5	8

Fourth round
(United States) CM Bull	2	2	4
(United States) EW Leonard	6	6	6

==== Section 8 ====
First round

Second round
FH Potter
BC Fiourney	w/o
(United States) F Foster
(United States) M Howland	w/o
(United States) N Niles	w/o
(United States) RC Seaver
(United States) H Oelrichs	w/o
(United States) D Miller

Third round
BC Fiourney	3	3	0
(United States) M Howland	6	6	6
(United States) N Niles	6	6	6
(United States) H Oelrichs	1	0	3

Fourth round
(United States) M Howland	0	2	1
(United States) N Niles	6	6	6

Preceded by 1904 Wimbledon Championships – Men's singles	Grand Slam men's singles	Succeeded by 1905 Australasian Championships – Men's singles
