= Jed Jones =

American tennis player

- Country (sports): United States
- Born: John Davis Edmands Jones February 4, 1872 Worcester, Massachusetts, United States
- Died: November 8, 1960 New York, United States

Grand Slam singles results
- Wimbledon: 1R (1921)
- US Open: SF (1906)

John "Jed" Davis Edmands Jones (February 4, 1872 – November 8, 1960) was an American tennis player active in the early 20th century.

== Tennis career ==
Jones reached the semifinals of the U.S. National Championships in 1906 (losing to William Clothier) and the quarterfinals in 1905, 1908 and 1911.

=== Grand Slam tournament performance timeline ===
Key
W	F	SF	QF	#R	RR	Q#	DNQ	A	NH

(W) winner; (F) finalist; (SF) semifinalist; (QF) quarterfinalist; (#R) rounds 4, 3, 2, 1; (RR) round-robin stage; (Q#) qualification round; (DNQ) did not qualify; (A) absent; (NH) not held; (SR) strike rate (events won / competed); (W–L) win–loss record.

Tournament	1895	1903	1904	1905	1906	1907	1908	1909	1910	1911	1921
Australian Open	NH	NH	NH	A	A	A	A	A	A	A	A
Wimbledon	A	A	A	A	A	A	A	A	A	A	1R
US Open	4R	2R	2R	QF	SF	1R	QF	Q1	4R	QF	A
