= 1906 U.S. National Championships – Men's singles =

Men's singles
- 1906 U.S. National Championships

Final
- Champion: (United States) William Clothier
- Runner-up: (United States) Beals Wright
- Score: 6–3, 6–0, 6–4

Events
Singles	men	women
Doubles	men	women
← 1905 ·	U.S. National Championships	· 1907 →

William Clothier defeated defending champion Beals Wright in the Challenge Round 6–3, 6–0, 6–4 to win the men's singles tennis title at the 1906 U.S. National Championships. Clothier had defeated Karl Behr in the All Comers' Final.

The event was held at the Newport Casino in Newport, R.I. in the United States.

== Draw ==
=== Challenge round ===
Challenge Round
(United States) Beals Wright	3	0	4
(United States) William Clothier	6	6	6

=== All Comers' finals ===
Quarterfinals
(United States) Edgar Leonard	2	3	1
(United States) Jed Jones	6	6	6
(United States) Fred Alexander	6	2	6	6	5
(United States) William Clothier	8	6	4	1	7
(United States) Karl Behr	1	6	6	6
(United States) Robert LeRoy	6	4	3	3
(United States) Raymond Little	6	2
(United States) Harold Hackett	2	1^{r}

Semifinals
(United States) Jed Jones	3	3	3
(United States) William Clothier	6	6	6
(United States) Karl Behr	2	6	6	11	6
(United States) Raymond Little	6	2	8	9	4

Finals
(United States) William Clothier	6	6	6
(United States) Karl Behr	2	4	2

=== Earlier rounds ===
==== Section 1 ====
First round
(United States) A Thayer	w/	o
(United States) LH Waidner
(United States) SP Henshaw	w/	o
(United Kingdom) SH Smith
HC Townsend	6	6	6
SD Bradley	0	0	2

Second round
WE Putnam	6	6	6
(United States) GT Scott	0	0	0
CS Brigham	w/	o
(United States) N Emerson
(United States) EW Leonard	6	6	6
(United States) A Thayer	0	0	1
(United States) SP Henshaw	6	4	2
HC Townsend	7	6	6

Third round
WE Putnam	6	6	6	6	6
CS Brigham	8	8	3	3	3
(United States) EW Leonard	6	8	6
HC Townsend	3	6	0

Fourth round
WE Putnam	4	6	2
(United States) EW Leonard	6	8	6

==== Section 2 ====
First round
HG Simmons	6	5	4	6	6
(United States) AS Dabney	1	7	6	3	1
(United States) JDE Jones	6	6	6
(United States) E Torrey	2	1	3
(United States) DF Appleton	w/	o
(United States) William Keene
(United States) JS Seabury	7	6	6	6
(United States) TC Trask	9	1	3	2
(United States) JR Carpenter	6	6	6
(United States) C Carmichael	0	1	1
(United States) RUN Gambrill	6	6	6
(United States) D Orne	3	1	3
(United States) T Gross	6	6	6
SM Peacock	2	1	1
FC Mahoney	w/	o
HW Warner

Second round
HG Simmons	2	2	2
(United States) JDE Jones	6	6	6
(United States) DF Appleton	6	6	6
(United States) JS Seabury	4	0	2
(United States) JR Carpenter	w/	o
(United States) RUN Gambrill
(United States) T Gross	w/	o
FC Mahoney

Third round
(United States) JDE Jones	6	6	6
(United States) DF Appleton	0	1	2
(United States) JR Carpenter	5	3	8	6	7
(United States) T Gross	7	6	6	1	9

Fourth round
(United States) JDE Jones	6	6	6
(United States) T Gross	3	1	3

==== Section 3 ====
First round
(United States) AD Sweetzer	7	4	2	6	6
(United States) PL Schuyler	5	6	6	4	1
JO Ames	6	8	6
JB Read	0	6	1
(United States) JD Pell	6	6	6
GB Simmons	1	0	1
(United States) RF Lovering	6	6	6
(United States) RA Thomas	1	0	1
(United States) C Cooke	6	6	5	6	8
(United States) WV Bennett	4	1	7	8	6
(United States) WP Burden	6	6	6
S Prescott	2	0	0
(United States) F Alexander	w/	o
(United States) E Schlesinger
TI Townsend	6	6	6
EH Frank	3	1	3

Second round
(United States) AD Sweetzer	1	4	4
JO Ames	6	6	6
(United States) JD Pell	6	2	6	4	6
(United States) RF Lovering	2	6	3	6	2
(United States) C Cooke	6	2	3	7	6
(United States) WP Burden	2	6	6	5	2
(United States) F Alexander	6	6	6
TI Townsend	1	0	1

Third round
JO Ames	2	3
(United States) JD Pell	6	1^{r}
(United States) C Cooke	1	3	0
(United States) F Alexander	6	6	6

Fourth round
JO Ames	3	6	0
(United States) F Alexander	6	8	6

==== Section 4 ====
First round
JA Ross	w/	o
(United States) W Stackpole
(United States) A Aselin	w/	o
(United States) OL Mills
(United States) C Fosdick	w/	o
(United States) PA Carroll
(United States) P Hawk	w/	o
HB Hubbard
RL Agassiz	w/	o
(United States) G Rubelee
(United States) W Clothier	6	6	6
(United States) H MacKinney	1	0	4
(United States) FC Colston	6	6	6
CE Van Vleck	0	2	4
(United States) FJ Sulloway	w/	o
(United States) GA Lyon Jr.

Second round
JA Ross	6	6	6
(United States) A Aselin	1	0	0
(United States) C Fosdick	0	3	2
(United States) P Hawk	6	6	6
RL Agassiz
(United States) W Clothier	w/	o
(United States) FC Colston	5	3	6	0
(United States) FJ Sulloway	7	6	3	6

Third round
JA Ross	6	3	4	3
(United States) P Hawk	4	6	6	6
(United States) W Clothier	6	6	6
(United States) FJ Sulloway	0	3	4

Fourth round
(United States) P Hawk	1	2	6
(United States) W Clothier	6	6	8

==== Section 5 ====
First round
(United States) K Behr	w/	o
(United States) CH Hatch
(United States) W Larned	w/	o
RN Buckley
(United States) H Holt	w/	o
(United States) HS Vanderbilt
D Noblit	6	6	6
(United States) C Lanier	2	2	0
EV Page	7	7	6
(United States) CR Budlong	5	5	3
(United States) EW Catlin	6	6	6
(United States) B Thaw	2	3	0
(United States) HE Foster	w/	o
(United States) M Wright
WP Carter	6	6	6
(United States) D Morris	1	3	1

Second round
(United States) K Behr	6	6	7
(United States) W Larned	4	4	5
(United States) H Holt	6	6	6
D Noblit	1	0	1
EV Page	6	6	6
(United States) EW Catlin	2	1	3
(United States) HE Foster
WP Carter	w/	o

Third round
(United States) K Behr	6	6	6
(United States) H Holt	3	2	3
EV Page	6	6	6
WP Carter	1	3	2

Fourth round
(United States) K Behr	6	6	6
EV Page	0	3	3

==== Section 6 ====
First round
(United States) W Johnson	w/	o
(United States) C Hobart
(United States) IC Wright	7	6	6
(United States) N Niles	5	1	2
AL Hoskins	6	6	7
JJG Darnagh	0	1	5
(United States) Goelet Gallatin	6	6	6
FJ Otis	0	2	2
(United States) R Leroy	6	6	8
RT Townsend	4	4	6
(United States) P Fosdick	6	6	6
AH Barnard	0	0	1
(United States) CM Bull	6	6	6
(United States) GT Adee	4	4	2
HB Register	w/	o
(United States) EP Fischer

Second round
(United States) W Johnson	8	3	2	4
(United States) IC Wright	6	6	6	6
AL Hoskins	6	4	6	6
(United States) Goelet Gallatin	4	6	4	2
(United States) R Leroy	6	4	0
(United States) P Fosdick	2	6	0^{r}
(United States) CM Bull	7	6	7
HB Register	5	2	5

Third round
(United States) IC Wright	6	6	6
AL Hoskins	4	2	1
(United States) R Leroy	5	6	6	6
(United States) CM Bull	7	2	3	1

Fourth round
(United States) IC Wright	6	6	3	3	3
(United States) R Leroy	4	4	6	6	6

==== Section 7 ====
First round
JC Goodfellow	6	6	6
(United States) R Nevis	3	1	1
W Donnell Iselin	w/	o
(United States) H Slocum
AC Way	7	2	6	6
(United States) LR Freeman	5	6	3	0
AN Reggio	w/	o
(United States) C Biddle
(United States) W Spencer	6	6	6	6
(United States) A Schwartz	8	1	2	1
(United States) RN Dana	w/	o
(United States) R Stevens
(United States) RD Little	6	6	8
(United States) F Anderson	3	4	6
LW Glazebrook	w/	o
S Beardsley

Second round
JC Goodfellow
W Donnell Iselin	w/	o
AC Way	6	6	6
AN Reggio	4	3	3
(United States) W Spencer
(United States) RN Dana	w/	o
(United States) RD Little	6	6	6
LW Glazebrook	1	2	3

Third round
W Donnell Iselin	0	4	3
AC Way	6	6	6
(United States) RN Dana	2	3	2
(United States) RD Little	6	6	6

Fourth round
AC Way	4	1	0
(United States) RD Little	6	6	6

==== Section 8 ====
First round
FH Howland	w/	o
(United States) F Watson
(United States) H Hackett	6	6	7
GT Eames	2	2	5

Second round
FH Howland	3	8	3	4
(United States) H Hackett	6	6	6	6
GA Thompson	w/	o
JP Hogres
(United States) A Stillman	6	6	6
JA Fowler	3	2	4
HM Harriman	w/	o
(United States) J Talmage

Third round
(United States) H Hackett	w/	o
GA Thompson
(United States) A Stillman	w/	o
HM Harriman

Fourth round
(United States) H Hackett	6	6	3	6
(United States) A Stillman	3	3	6	2

Preceded by 1906 Wimbledon Championships – Men's singles	Grand Slam men's singles	Succeeded by 1907 Australasian Championships – Men's singles
