= Sulloway =

Sulloway is a surname. Notable people with the surname include:

- Cyrus A. Sulloway (1839–1917), American attorney and Republican member of the US House of Representatives
- Frank Sulloway (born 1947), American psychologist
- Frank Jones Sulloway (1883–1981), American tennis player
