= Chicopee, Missouri =

Unincorporated community in Missouri, U.S.

Coordinates: 36°59′06″N 91°00′20″W

Chicopee is an unincorporated community in northern Carter County, in the U.S. state of Missouri. The community is located on the south bank of the Current River just southeast of Van Buren.

== History ==
Chicopee was platted in 1888, and named after Chicopee, Massachusetts, the native home of a railroad official, George H. Nettleton. A post office called Chicopee was established in 1892, and remained in operation until 1900.
