= 1905 U.S. National Championships (tennis) =

- Date: August 22–31 (M); June 20–24 (W)
- Edition: 25th
- Category: Grand Slam
- Surface: Grass
- Location: Newport, R.I., United States (M); Philadelphia, PA, United States (W)

Champions

Men's singles
- (United States) Beals Wright

Women's singles
- (United States) Elisabeth Moore

Men's doubles
- (United States) Holcombe Ward / (United States) Beals Wright

Women's doubles
- (United States) Helen Homans / (United States) Carrie Neely

Mixed doubles
- (United States) Augusta Schultz / (United States) Clarence Hobart
- U.S. National Championships

The 1905 U.S. National Championships tennis tournament (now known as the US Open) was a tennis tournament that took place in June and August of 1905. The women's tournament was held from June 20 to June 24 on the outdoor grass courts at the Philadelphia Cricket Club in Philadelphia, Pennsylvania. The men's tournament was held from August 22 to August 31 on the outdoor grass courts at the Newport Casino in Newport, Rhode Island. It was the 25th U.S. National Championships and the second Grand Slam tournament of the year.

== Finals ==
=== Men's singles ===
(United States) Beals Wright (USA) defeated (United States) Holcombe Ward (USA) 6–2, 6–1, 11–9

=== Women's singles ===
(United States) Elisabeth Moore (USA) defeated (United States) Helen Homans (USA) 6–4, 5–7, 6–1

=== Men's doubles ===
(United States) Holcombe Ward (USA) / (United States) Beals Wright (USA) defeated (United States) Fred Alexander (USA) / (United States) Harold Hackett (USA) 6–4, 6–4, 6–4

=== Women's doubles ===
(United States) Helen Homans (USA) / (United States) Carrie Neely (USA) defeated (United States) Marjorie Oberteuffer (USA) / (United States) Virginia Maule (USA) 6–0, 6–1

=== Mixed doubles ===
(United States) Augusta Schultz (USA) / (United States) Clarence Hobart (USA) defeated (United States) Elisabeth Moore (USA) / (Australia) Edward Dewhurst (USA) 6–2, 6–4

| Preceded by 1905 Wimbledon Championships | Grand Slams | Succeeded by 1905 Australasian Championships |
