= France Forever =

American organization

Emblem of France Forever, Inc., c. 1944

France Forever (French: France Quand Même) was an organization founded on June 29, 1940 as an association of French men and women living in the United States, as well as American friends of France, acting to preserve comradeship between these countries in the cause of freedom and democracy.

The organisation was created to support Général de Gaulle in the fight against the Nazi occupation, and Vichy France. It aimed to represent de Gaulle in the United States and to acquire embassy status. It also declared to: "Assist the United States in all measures of preparedness to meet the menace to democratic institutions." In 1941, the France Forever association had forty-six sections.

Its headquarters was located on Fifth Avenue in Manhattan, NYC.

== Founders & action ==
Founders:

- Major General William G. Price Jr. - commandeur de la Légion d'honneur
- Oswald Chew - Officier de la Légion d'honneur
- Emile C. Geyelin - Chevalier de la Légion d'honneur
- Roger E. Brunschwig - Commandeur de la Légion d'honneur. A much‐decorated French hero of the two world wars.
- Eugene J. Houdry - Chevalier de la Légion d'honneur. Vocal in opposing the government of Vichy France under Marshall Philippe Pétain and its collaboration with Germany and vocally and publicly criticized Pétain, stating that he did not speak for the French people.

Houdry was its first President.

- Fred G. Hoffherr - Chevalier de la Légion d'honneur, becoming its publicity director and later its executive vice-president.
- Emile G. Henno - Chevalier de la Légion d'honneur
- Henri L. Laussucq
- Pierre Quilleret - industrialist, Eugene Houdry's brother-in-law
- Jacques de Sieyes - Officer de la Légion d'honneur
- Docteur Albert Simard - Chavalier de la Légion d'honneur.

Founded in his apartment.

- Maurice Garreau-Dombasle, was the Chairman Executive Committee. From the New York Times in September 1940:
  Declaring that he would "never accept any task under German control," Maurice Garreau-Dombasle, for thirteen years commercial counselor of the French Embassy in the United States, declined yesterday to obey the order of the Petain government to return to France.

The organisation became affiliated with the French Committee of National Liberation and published a monthly bulletin promoting its ideas, fighting against Nazi propaganda and having the voice of France to be heard in the United States as well as encouraging those in France to resist and play their part in bringing about ultimate victory.

Michel Wibault, De Gaulle appointed him as technical director of France Forever. On 17 June 1940 Wibault escaped with his wife Marie-Rose from Paris to London.

From there Michel and Marie-Rose travelled to England, where they made contact with General de Gaulle. Michel Wibault joined France Forever, within which he was appointed technical director by de Gaulle.

Wibault was one of its "most active men."

Fred G. Hoffherr cabled de Gaulle, "Command, we shall obey . ... Vive la France!" Next day, Eugene Houdry cabled him (referring to the French people): "They are entirely at your orders."

Following Charles de Gaulle's appeal on 18 June 1940, on 29 June, Dr Albert Simard, who was president of the French Veterans of the Great War, and also of the Associated French Societies of New York, had called a public meeting to launch a support movement.

Simard stated:

We are convinced that France and all enslaved European democracies can be freed only by British victory and that a German victory over Britain will be the signal for an attack on all of the Americas.

In 1943, Richard de Rochemont became the president of France Forever and continued his action until after the Liberation, giving way to Dr. Simard serving as president, Chairman of the executive committee, of sessions. (After being vice president.). Simard would later become involved with the Society for the Prevention of World War III, serving as its Secretary.
