= 1905 U.S. National Championships – Men's singles =

Men's singles
- 1905 U.S. National Championships

Final
- Champion: (United States) Beals Wright
- Runner-up: (United States) Holcombe Ward
- Score: 6–2, 6–1, 11–9

Events
| Singles | men | women |
| Doubles | men | women |
- U.S. National Championships

Beals Wright defeated the defending champion Holcombe Ward in the Challenge Round, 6–2, 6–1, 11–9 to win the men's singles tennis title at the 1905 U.S. National Championships. Wright had defeated Clarence Hobart in the All Comers' Final.

The event was held at the Newport Casino in Newport, R.I., United States.

== Draw ==
=== Challenge round ===
| Challenge Round |
| (United States) Holcombe Ward | 2 | 1 | 9 |
| (United States) Beals Wright | 6 | 6 | 11 |

=== All Comers' finals ===
Quarterfinals
(United States) Kreigh Collins | 7 | 5 | 6 | 6
(United States) Jed Jones | 5 | 7 | 3 | 1
(United States) Richard Stevens | 6 | 4 | 2 | 4
(United States) Clarence Hobart | 2 | 6 | 6 | 6
(United States) William Clothier | 7 | 2 | 2
(United States) Beals Wright | 9 | 6 | 6
(United States) William Larned | 6 | 6 | 6
(United States) Karl Behr | 2 | 1 | 1

Semifinals
(United States) Kreigh Collins | 6 | 4 | 9 | 4 | 4
(United States) Clarence Hobart | 4 | 6 | 7 | 6 | 6
(United States) Beals Wright | 4 | 6 | 6 | 6
(United States) William Larned | 6 | 3 | 2 | 2

Finals
(United States) Clarence Hobart | 4 | 1 | 3
(United States) Beals Wright | 6 | 6 | 6

=== Earlier rounds ===
==== Section 1 ====
First round

Second round
(United States) GC Hinckley | 6 | 6 | 6
(United States) HE Foster | 0 | 0 | 0
(United States) GA Lyon Jr. | w/ | o
RS Holland
JO Ames | 4 | 3 | 9 | 7 | 6
LT Wallace | 6 | 6 | 7 | 5 | 2
(United States) K Collins | 6 | 6 | 6
JP Baer | 1 | 0 | 4

Third round
(United States) GC Hinckley | 2 | 6 | 2 | 9 | 2
(United States) GA Lyon Jr. | 6 | 2 | 6 | 7 | 6
JO Ames | 1 | 2 | 0
(United States) K Collins | 6 | 6 | 6

Fourth round
(United States) GA Lyon Jr. | 1 | 2 | 5
(United States) K Collins | 6 | 6 | 7

==== Section 2 ====
First round
(United States) A Goadby | w/ | o
GA Thomsom
AL Hoskins | 6 | 6 | 6
SG Gray | 1 | 1 | 0
(United States) CH Hatch | w/ | o
(United States) M Chace
(United States) K Horton | 6 | 6 | 6
(United States) RA Thomas | 0 | 1 | 2
A Wadsworth | 6 | 6 | 6
(United States) S Gordon | 1 | 2 | 2

Second round
(United States) JDE Jones | 6 | 6 | 6
CS Brigham | 0 | 3 | 2
LF Stearn
(United States) A Goadby | w/ | o
AL Hoskins | 3 | 6 | 6 | 6
(United States) CH Hatch | 6 | 4 | 2 | 2
(United States) K Horton | 7 | 6 | 6
A Wadsworth | 5 | 3 | 2

Third round
(United States) JDE Jones | w/ | o
(United States) A Goadby
AL Hoskins | 7 | 3 | 4
(United States) K Horton | 9 | 6 | 6

Fourth round
(United States) JDE Jones | 2 | 9 | 6 | 6
(United States) K Horton | 6 | 7 | 2 | 1

==== Section 3 ====
First round
(United States) L Perry | 6 | 6 | 6
(United States) LJ Grant | 1 | 1 | 0
(United States) DF Appleton | 6 | 6 | 6
(United States) William Keene | 2 | 0 | 0
(United States) H Slocum | 5 | 6 | 6 | 7
(United States) N Niles | 7 | 4 | 2 | 5
(United States) HA Sands | 6 | 6 | 6
(United States) Charles J. Stevens | 1 | 1 | 1
(United States) R Stevens | 6 | 6 | 6
(United States) CR Budlong | 1 | 0 | 2
FH Cranston | w/ | o
WA Sands
CF Watson Jr. | 6 | 7 | 6
M Beckwith Smith | 1 | 5 | 4
(United States) F Alexander | 6 | 6
LG Morris | 2 | 2

Second round
(United States) L Perry | 6 | 6 | 6
(United States) DF Appleton | 2 | 1 | 1
(United States) H Slocum | 6 | 6 | 6
(United States) HA Sands | 2 | 2 | 0
(United States) R Stevens | 6 | 6 | 6
FH Cranston | 1 | 1 | 4
CF Watson Jr. | 4 | 6
(United States) F Alexander | 6 | 4 | r

Third round
(United States) L Perry | 6 | 6 | 6 | 6
(United States) H Slocum | 1 | 3 | 8 | 4
(United States) R Stevens | 6 | 6 | 3 | 6
CF Watson Jr. | 1 | 4 | 6 | 0

Fourth round
(United States) L Perry | 3 | 2 | 3
(United States) R Stevens | 6 | 6 | 6

==== Section 4 ====
First round
(United States) FC Colston | w/ | o
HC Pell
(United States) C Hobart | w/ | o
FJ Otis
(United States) O Chew | w/ | o
(United States) B Huntington
AL Sands | w/ | o
JC Waterbury
(United States) RN Dana | w/ | o
HB Register
WF Hitt | w/ | o
(United States) C Bunting
JA Tuckerman | 6 | 6 | 6
IC Jennings | 1 | 3 | 0
CE Van Vleck | 4 | 6 | 3 | 8 | 6
(United States) SP Henshaw | 6 | 4 | 6 | 6 | 1

Second round
(United States) FC Colston | 1 | 4 | 5
(United States) C Hobart | 6 | 6 | 7
(United States) O Chew | w/ | o
AL Sands
(United States) RN Dana | 6 | 6 | 6
WF Hitt | 1 | 1 | 0
JA Tuckerman | 3 | 6 | 6 | 6
CE Van Vleck | 6 | 3 | 0 | 1

Third round
(United States) C Hobart | w/ | o
(United States) O Chew
(United States) RN Dana | 6 | 6 | 6
JA Tuckerman | 3 | 3 | 1

Fourth round
(United States) C Hobart | 10 | 6 | 2 | 4 | 6
(United States) RN Dana | 8 | 2 | 6 | 6 | 2

==== Section 5 ====
First round
(United States) LH Waidner | w/ | o
(United States) A Codman
(United States) B Thaw | w/ | o
(United States) HW Warner
(United States) T Slidwell | 6 | 6 | 6
(United States) L Holt | 1 | 1 | 4
(United States) A Stillman | w/ | o
(United States) J Talmage
(United States) H Masson | 5 | 6 | 6 | 6
F Cutting | 7 | 1 | 2 | 3
(United States) GH Nettleton | 2 | 6 | 6 | 6
(United States) H Holt | 6 | 3 | 2 | 3
(United States) JF Brice | w/ | o
(United Kingdom) MJ Ritchie
(United States) W Clothier | 6 | 4 | 6 | 6
SC Whipple | 1 | 6 | 4 | 2

Second round
(United States) LH Waidner | 6 | 6 | 6
(United States) B Thaw | 0 | 0 | 0
(United States) T Slidwell | 3 | 3 | 5
(United States) A Stillman | 6 | 6 | 7
(United States) H Masson
(United States) GH Nettleton | w/ | o
(United States) JF Brice | 1 | 1 | 1
(United States) W Clothier | 6 | 6 | 6

Third round
(United States) LH Waidner | 6 | 6 | 6
(United States) A Stillman | 2 | 1 | 3
(United States) GH Nettleton | 4 | 6 | 3 | 2
(United States) W Clothier | 6 | 1 | 6 | 6

Fourth round
(United States) LH Waidner | 9 | 6 | 2 | 4 | 4
(United States) W Clothier | 7 | 4 | 6 | 6 | 6

==== Section 6 ====
First round
(United States) W Johnson | 6 | 4 | 6 | 6
SX Whipple | 1 | 6 | 4 | 2
(United States) B Detyll | w/ | o
(United States) EL Hall
(United States) BC Wright | w/ | o
(United States) P Lydig
(United States) WC Grant | 6 | 6 | 6
(United States) S Cutting | 2 | 1 | 2
(United States) HF Allen | w/ | o
WE Brice
(United States) CE Sands | 7 | 3 | 6 | 7
(United States) T Gross | 5 | 6 | 2 | 5
(United States) FJ Sulloway | w/ | o
(United States) R Leroy
WE Putnam | 7 | 6 | 9 | 5 | 6
(United States) C Pell | 5 | 2 | 11 | 7 | 4

Second round
(United States) W Johnson | w/ | o
(United States) B Detyll
(United States) BC Wright | 6 | 4 | 6 | 6
(United States) WC Grant | 1 | 6 | 1 | 1
(United States) HF Allen | 7 | 6 | 6
(United States) CE Sands | 5 | 3 | 1
(United States) FJ Sulloway | 6 | 6 | 6
WE Putnam | 2 | 3 | 3

Third round
(United States) W Johnson | 0 | 1 | 3
(United States) BC Wright | 6 | 6 | 6
(United States) HF Allen | 6 | 6 | 7
(United States) FJ Sulloway | 3 | 4 | 5

Fourth round
(United States) BC Wright | 6 | 6 | 6
(United States) HF Allen | 2 | 0 | 4

==== Section 7 ====
First round
(United States) W Larned | 6 | 6 | 6
(United States) EW Leonard | 2 | 1 | 2
JR Livermore | w/ | o
EJ Smith
(United States) TH Guild | w/ | o
(United States) HA Havermeyer
(United States) E Stille | w/ | o
JRB Willing

Second round
(United States) W Larned | w/ | o
JR Livermore
(United States) TH Guild | 6 | 0 | 1 | 6 | 2
(United States) E Stille | 1 | 6 | 6 | 4 | 6
(United States) RD Little | w/ | o
(United States) CM Bull
(United States) F Anderson | 6 | 6 | 6
HE Straw | 2 | 4 | 4

Third round
(United States) W Larned | 6 | 6 | 6
(United States) E Stille | 2 | 2 | 1
(United States) RD Little | 6 | 6 | 6
(United States) F Anderson | 3 | 4 | 3

Fourth round
(United States) W Larned | 6 | 6 | 2 | 7
(United States) RD Little | 0 | 1 | 6 | 5

==== Section 8 ====
First round

Second round
(United States) C Biddle | w/ | o
W Donnell Iselin
(United States) P Hawk | 6 | 6 | 6 | 2 | 6
(United States) GT Adee | 8 | 4 | 1 | 6 | 3
(United States) K Behr | 6 | 6 | 6
(United States) W Burton | 1 | 3 | 1
WC Mueller | w/ | o
(United States) WP Burden

Third round
(United States) C Biddle | 6 | 6 | 6 | 4 | 6
(United States) P Hawk | 3 | 2 | 8 | 6 | 3
(United States) K Behr | 6 | 6 | 6
WC Mueller | 0 | 2 | 2

Fourth round
(United States) C Biddle | 1 | 0 | 4
(United States) K Behr | 6 | 6 | 6

| Preceded by 1905 Wimbledon Championships – Men's singles | Grand Slam men's singles | Succeeded by 1906 Australasian Championships – Men's singles |
