= William Larned =

American tennis player

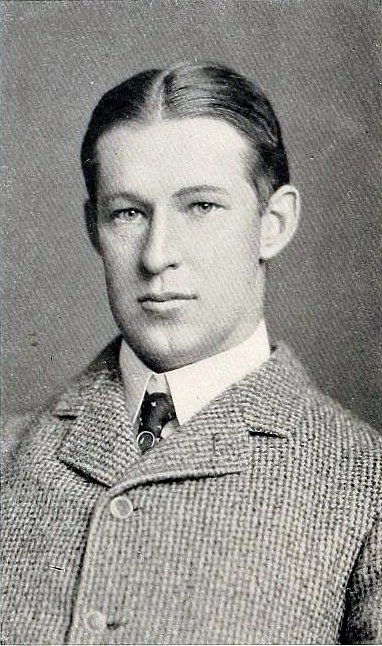
- Larned in 1901
- Full name: William Augustus Larned
- Country (sports): United States
- Born: December 30, 1872 Summit, New Jersey, US
- Died: December 16, 1926 (aged 53) New York City, US
- Turned pro: 1890 (amateur tour)
- Retired: 1911
- Plays: Right-handed (one-handed backhand)
- Int. Tennis HoF: 1956 (member page)

Singles
- Career record: 291–71 (80.3%)
- Career titles: 48
- Highest ranking: No. 1 (1901, ITHF)

Grand Slam singles results
- Wimbledon: QF (1896, 1905)
- US Open: W (1901, 1902, 1907, 1908, 1909, 1910, 1911)

Grand Slam doubles results
- Wimbledon: SF (1905)

Team competitions
- Davis Cup: W (1902)

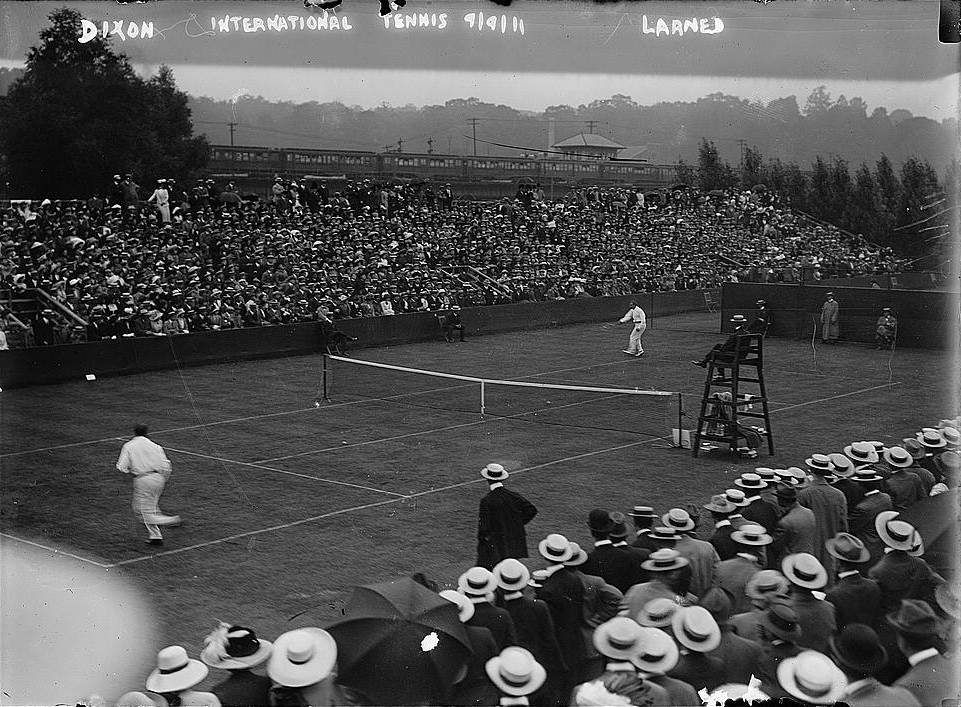
Charles Dixon vs. William Augustus Larned on September 9, 1911

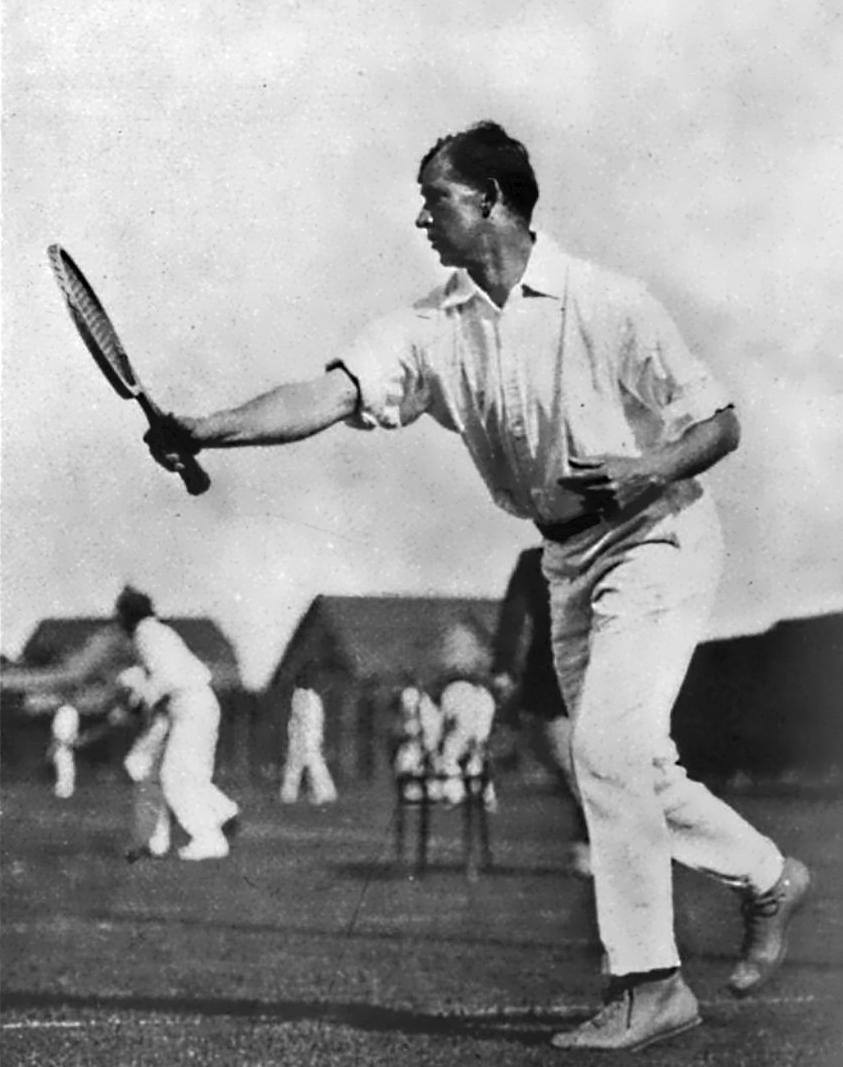
William Larned in action

William Augustus Larned (December 30, 1872 – December 16, 1926) was an American tennis player who was active at the beginning of the 20th century. He won seven singles titles at the U.S. National Championships.

== Biography ==
Larned was born and raised in Summit, New Jersey, on the estate of his father, William Zebedee Larned, a wealthy lawyer and a major landowner in Summit. Stoneover, the manor house in which he grew up, today houses the administrative and faculty offices of the Oak Knoll School. Larned Road in Summit honors both father and son; Brayton School in Summit was named in honor of his younger brother Brayton, who died at age 15. He came from a family that could trace its American roots to shortly after the arrival of the Mayflower. In 1890 he came to Cornell University to study mechanical engineering. He first gained fame in his junior year, when he became the first (and to this day, the only) Cornellian to win the intercollegiate tennis championship.

An all-around athlete, Larned captained the St. Nicholas Hockey Club in 1896–97 and was also a horseman, golfer, and rifle shot. He invented the steel-framed racquet in 1922 and founded a company to manufacture it.

Larned won the title seven times, as did Richard Sears before him and Bill Tilden after. Larned was a member of the U.S. Davis Cup Team in 1902–03, 1905, 1908–09 and 1911–12. Larned achieved a career-high U.S. ranking of No. 1. He twice participated in the Wimbledon Championships, in 1896 and 1905, but could not match his success at home, losing on both occasions in the quarterfinals.

Larned also won other tournaments multiple times including the Longwood Challenge Bowl eleven times (1894–1897, 1901, 1903–1909), the Middle States Championships six times (1894–95, 1897, 1899, 1906–1907), and the Southampton Invitation three times (1902, 1904, 1906).

He was inducted in the International Tennis Hall of Fame in 1956.

Larned in 1898 had served in the Spanish–American War as one of Theodore Roosevelt's Rough Riders. While serving in the war, Larned developed rheumatism in Cuba; rheumatoid arthritis later deteriorated his health forcing him to retire from tennis after losing the Davis Cup challenge round in early 1912. Partially paralyzed by spinal meningitis, he was unable to do any of the activities he loved most, and became depressed. On the evening of December 15, 1926, inside the private chambers of the exclusive Knickerbocker Club in Manhattan, the 53-year-old Larned committed suicide by shooting himself.

== Playing style ==
In their book R.F. and H.L. Doherty - On Lawn Tennis (1903) multiple Wimbledon champions Reginald and Laurence Doherty described Larned's playing style:

Larned, when on his game, is very fine indeed and very brilliant. His is a good style and pleasant to watch. Throughout he hits hard, and goes for his stroke. With very little effort Larned gets great pace on the ball. His forehand is distinctly stronger than his backhand, but he puts top on both, hitting nearly at the height of the bound. Among his strongest points are his forehand volley, which is very hard indeed, and his service, which is a capital one of the ordinary straight kind, and which he, as a rule, follows up to the net. He is quick reaching the net after a good-length drive, and he can drive the ball while he is on the run. He is good at the volley but erratic at times in his return of service. He has really only one fault — namely, that he varies at times; he has his off-days.

On Lawn Tennis - 1903

== Grand Slam finals ==
=== Singles: 9 (7 titles, 2 runners-up) ===
Result	Year	Championship	Surface	Opponent	Score
Loss	1900	U.S. National Championships	Grass	(United States) Malcolm Whitman	4–6, 6–1, 2–6, 2–6
Win	1901	U.S. National Championships	Grass	(United States) Beals Wright	6–2, 6–8, 6–4, 6–4
Win	1902	U.S. National Championships	Grass	(United Kingdom of Great Britain and Ireland) Reginald Doherty	4–6, 6–2, 6–4, 8–6
Loss	1903	U.S. National Championships	Grass	(United Kingdom of Great Britain and Ireland) Laurence Doherty	0–6, 3–6, 8–10
Win	1907	U.S. National Championships	Grass	(United States) Robert LeRoy	6–2, 6–2, 6–4
Win	1908	U.S. National Championships	Grass	(United States) Beals Wright	6–1, 6–2, 8–6
Win	1909	U.S. National Championships	Grass	(United States) Bill Clothier	6–1, 6–2, 5–7, 1–6, 6–1
Win	1910	U.S. National Championships	Grass	(United States) Tom Bundy	6–1, 5–7, 6–0, 6–8, 6–1
Win	1911	U.S. National Championships	Grass	(United States) Maurice McLoughlin	6–4, 6–4, 6–2

== Performance timeline ==
Key
W	F	SF	QF	#R	RR	Q#	DNQ	A	NH

(W) winner; (F) finalist; (SF) semifinalist; (QF) quarterfinalist; (#R) rounds 4, 3, 2, 1; (RR) round-robin stage; (Q#) qualification round; (DNQ) did not qualify; (A) absent; (NH) not held; (SR) strike rate (events won / competed); (W–L) win–loss record.

Events with a challenge round: (W_{C}) won; (CR) lost the challenge round; (F_{A}) all comers' finalist

	1891	1892	1893	1894	1895	1896	1897	1898	1899	1900	1901	1902	1903	1904	1905	1906	1907	1908	1909	1910	1911	SR	W–L	Win %
Grand Slam tournaments																						7 / 20	66–14	82.50
French	only for French club members																					0 / 0	0–0	–
Wimbledon	A	A	A	A	A	QF	A	A	A	A	A	A	A	A	QF	A	A	A	A	A	A	0 / 2	5–2	71.43
U.S.	3R	F_{A}	A	F_{A}	F_{A}	F_{A}	SF	A	A	CR	W	W_{C}	CR	SF	SF	2R	W	W_{C}	W_{C}	W_{C}	W_{C}	7 / 18	61–12	83.56
Australian	not held														A	A	A	A	A	A	A	0 / 0	0–0	–
Win–loss	2–1	5–1	4–1	5–1	5–1	7–2	4–1	0–0	0–0	6–1	5–0	1–0	0–1	4–1	7–2	0–1	7–0	1–0	1–0	1–0	1–0			
