= Beals Wright =

American tennis player

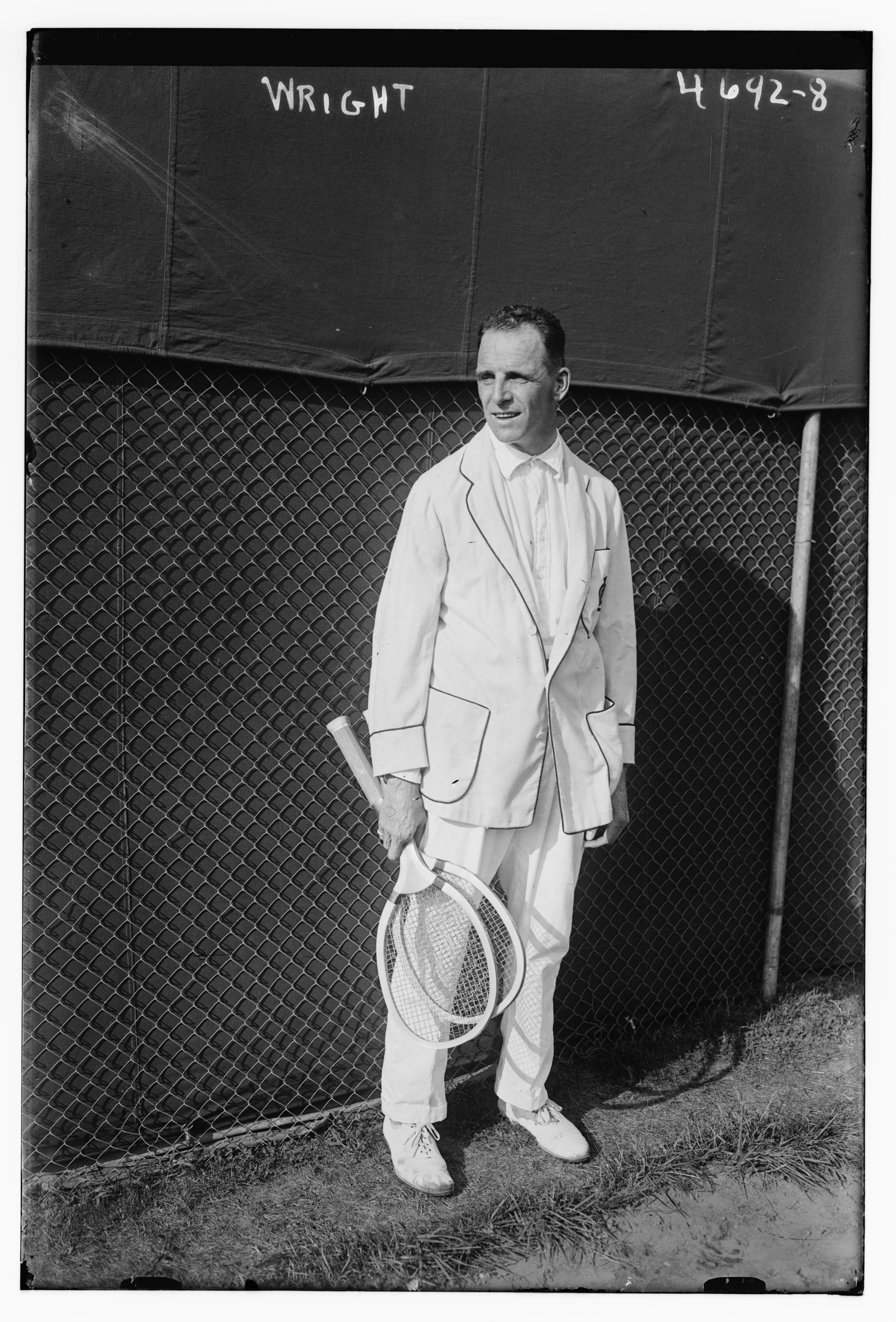
- Wright circa 1915
- Full name: Beals Coleman Wright
- Country (sports): United States
- Born: December 19, 1879 Boston, Massachusetts, United States
- Died: August 23, 1961 (aged 81) Alton, Illinois, United States
- Plays: Left-handed (one-handed backhand)
- Int. Tennis HoF: 1956 (member page)

Singles
- Career record: 254–70 (78.4%)
- Career titles: 27
- Highest ranking: No. 2 (1905, ITHF)

Grand Slam singles results
- Wimbledon: F (1910^{AC})
- US Open: W (1905)

Doubles
- Career record: incomplete

Grand Slam doubles results
- Wimbledon: F (1907)
- US Open: W (1904, 1905, 1906)
Medal record
Olympic Games – Tennis
Gold medal – first place	1904 St. Louis	Singles
Gold medal – first place	1904 St. Louis	Doubles

Beals Coleman Wright (December 19, 1879 – August 23, 1961) was an American tennis player who was active at the end of the 1890s and early 1900s. He won the singles title at the 1905 U.S. National Championships. Wright was a two-time Olympic gold medalist, and the older brother of American tennis player Irving Wright.

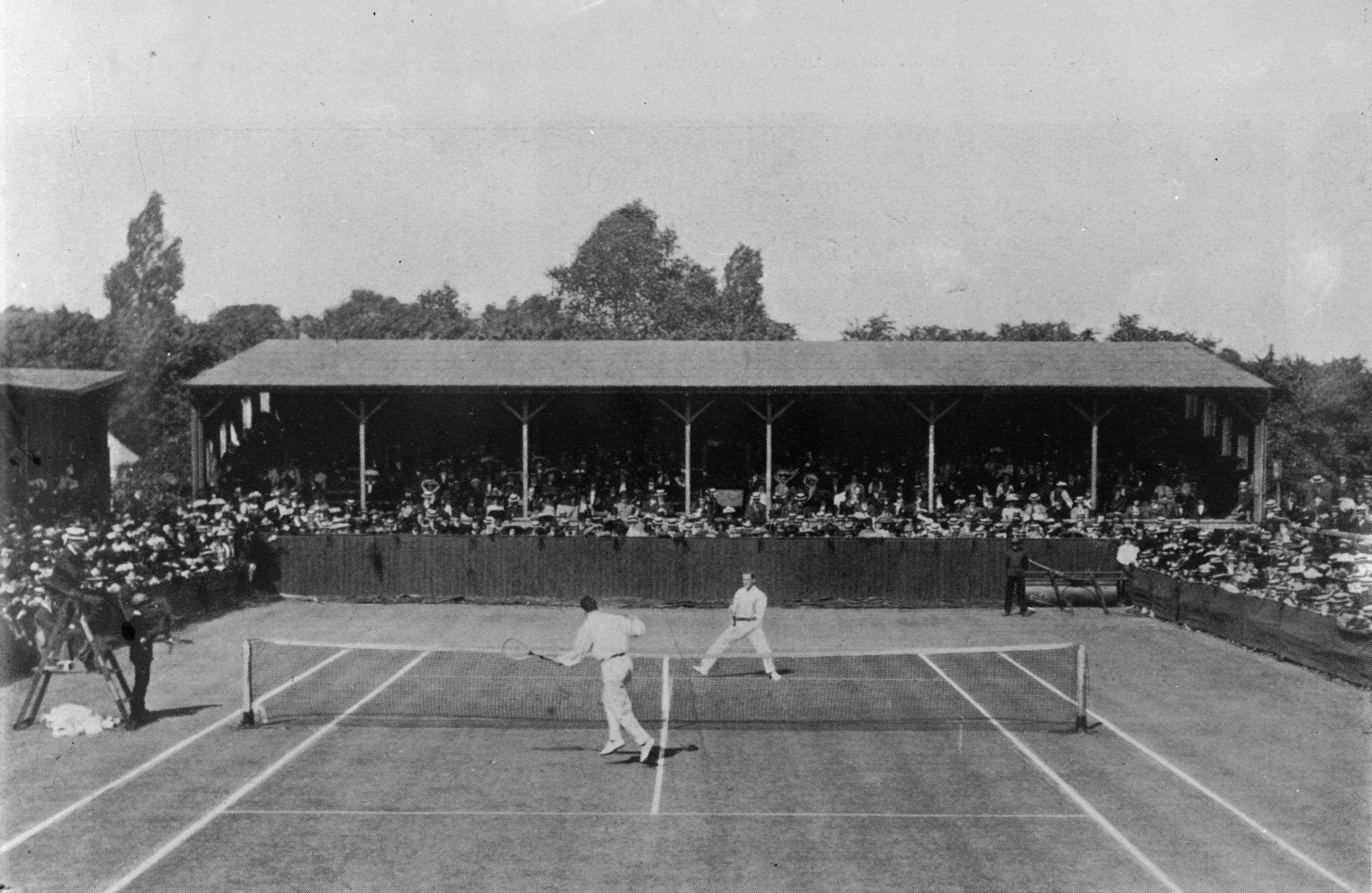
1910 Wimbledon All Comers' Final against Tony Wilding

== Biography ==
Beals was born in Boston, Massachusetts, on December 19, 1879, to George Wright, the shortstop for the Cincinnati Red Stockings and founder of the sporting goods store Wright & Ditson. Beals was the brother of Irving Wright, the 1917 and 1918 U.S. Championship mixed doubles champion. Together they won the men's doubles title at the Canadian Tennis Championship four times (1902, 1903, 1904, 1905). Beals was the nephew of baseball pioneer Harry Wright.

In 1899 Beals Wright traveled with his father to California where he played at the Delmonte Tennis Championship in Monterey. George Wright managed the team the same year he coached at Harvard. Two Harvard University players participated in the DelMonte Tournament-the first time east coast players took on California tennis champions.

Wright played at the 1904 St. Louis Olympics and won gold medals in both the singles and doubles competition. He also won three consecutive singles titles (1904–1906) at the Tri-State Tennis Tournament (now Cincinnati Open), and reached the doubles final (with Edgar Leonard) in 1904.

Wright won the Canadian International Championships, played in Niagara-on-the-Lake, in 1902, 1903 and 1904. In 1902 he won the Niagara International Tennis Tournament, also played in Niagara-on-the-Lake, by defeating Harold Hackett in the final in five sets and the default of Raymond Little in the challenge round.

Wright's most important victory came in 1905 when he won the men's singles title at the U.S. National Championships by defeating reigning champion Holcombe Ward in the Challenge Round in straight sets 6–2, 6–1, 11–9.

In 1915 he was hit by an errant baseball during a baseball game. In 1921 he was arrested following a car accident.

Beals Wright was inducted in the International Tennis Hall of Fame in 1956. He died in Alton, Illinois, on August 23, 1961.

== Playing style ==
In their book R.F. and H.L. Doherty - On Lawn Tennis (1903) multiple Wimbledon champions Reginald and Lawrence Doherty described Wright's playing style:

Beals Wright is certainly the best in America at low volleys, and is very good overhead. His volleying is distinctly superior to his ground strokes, and his forehand somewhat stronger than his backhand. He has a good service, which he follows up to the net.

On Lawn Tennis - 1903

== Grand Slam finals ==
=== Singles: 4 (1 title, 3 runners-up) ===
Result	Year	Championship	Surface	Opponent	Score
Loss	1901	U.S. National Championships	Grass	(United States) William Larned	2–6, 8–6, 4–6, 4–6
Win	1905	U.S. National Championships	Grass	(United States) Holcombe Ward	6–2, 6–1, 11–9
Loss	1906	U.S. National Championships	Grass	(United States) William Clothier	3–6, 0–6, 4–6
Loss	1908	U.S. National Championships	Grass	(United States) William Larned	1–6, 2–6, 6–8

=== Doubles: 7 (3 titles, 4 runners-up) ===
Result	Year	Championship	Surface	Partner	Opponents	Score
Loss	1901	U.S. National Championships	Grass	(United States) Leo Ware	(United States) Dwight Davis (United States) Holcombe Ward	3–6, 7–9, 1–6
Win	1904	U.S. National Championships	Grass	(United States) Holcombe Ward	(United States) Kreigh Collins (United States) Raymond Little	1–6, 6–2, 3–6, 6–4, 6–1
Win	1905	U.S. National Championships	Grass	(United States) Holcombe Ward	(United States) Fred Alexander (United States) Harold Hackett	6–4, 6–4, 6–1
Win	1906	U.S. National Championships	Grass	(United States) Holcombe Ward	(United States) Fred Alexander (United States) Harold Hackett	6–3, 3–6, 6–3, 6–3
Loss	1907	Wimbledon	Grass	(United States) Karl Behr	(Australia) Norman Brookes (New Zealand) Anthony Wilding	4–6, 4–6, 2–6
Loss	1908	U.S. National Championships	Grass	(United States) Raymond Little	(United States) Fred Alexander (United States) Harold Hackett	1–6, 5–7, 2–6
Loss	1918	U.S. National Championships	Grass	(United States) Fred Alexander	(United States) Vincent Richards (United States) Bill Tilden	3–6, 4–6, 6–3, 6–2, 2–6

== Singles performance timeline ==
Key
W	F	SF	QF	#R	RR	Q#	P#	DNQ	A	Z#	PO	G	S	B	NMS	NTI	P	NH

(W) winner; (F) finalist; (SF) semifinalist; (QF) quarterfinalist; (#R) rounds 4, 3, 2, 1; (RR) round-robin stage; (Q#) qualification round; (P#) preliminary round; (DNQ) did not qualify; (A) absent; (Z#) Davis/Fed Cup Zonal Group (with number indication) or (PO) play-off; (G) gold, (S) silver or (B) bronze Olympic/Paralympic medal; (NMS) not a Masters tournament; (NTI) not a Tier I tournament; (P) postponed; (NH) not held; (SR) strike rate (events won / competed); (W–L) win–loss record.

Events with a challenge round: (W_{C}) won; (CR) lost the challenge round; (F_{A}) all comers' finalist

	1897	1898	1899	1900	1901	1902	1903	1904	1905	1906	1907	1908		1909	1910	1911	1912		1913	1914	1915	1916	1917	1918	SR	W–L	Win %
Grand Slam tournaments
French	Only for French club members																				Not held				0 / 0	0–0	–
Wimbledon	A	A	A	A	A	A	A	A	4R	A	1R	A		A	F_{A}	A	A		A	A	Not held				0 / 3	7–3	70.0
U.S.	3R	2R	3R	SF	F	4R	2R	QF	W_{C}	CR	A	CR		A	F_{A}	F_{A}	A		A	A	A	A	A	4R	1 / 14	50–13	79.4
Australian	Not held								A	A	A	A		A	A	A	A		A	A	A	Not held			0 / 0	0–0	–
Win–loss	2–1	1–1	2–1	4–1	5–1	3–1	0–1	3–1	9–1	0–1	0–1	7–1			12–2	7–1								2–1	1 / 17	57–16	78.1
National representation
Olympics	Not held			A	Not held			G	Not held			A	A	Not held			A	A	Not held						1 / 1	5–0	100.0
