= Oswald Chew =

American author

Oswald Chew (March 24, 1880 — December 6, 1949) was an American lawyer, decorated Legion of honor and active in the US for de Gaulle against Vichy.

Oswald Chew was born on 24 May 1880, in Pennsylvania, to Samuel Chew and Mary Johnson Brown.

Around 1895, he married Ada Caroline Knowlton, in Upton, Worcester, Massachusetts.

Chew was awarded Croix de Guerre after WWI in 1917 and Legion of honor in 1925.

Chew served with Commission for Relief in Belgium, drove ambulance in France, and was liaison officer in France. He practiced law in Pennsylvania.

He authored: in 1925, France Courageous and Indomitable; in 1928: La question des dettes inter-alliées études réunies et publiées en Amerique en 1928, sous le titre The stroke of the moment. [The question of inter-allied debts studies collected and published in America in 1928, under the title The stroke of the moment]; in 1933: Now is the Time to Abolish the War Debts... and on June 16, 1932 wrote in the New York Times about the matter. In 1940 he authored: For a Better World Tomorrow.

Chew was a founding member of France Forever.

Chew died on 6 December 1949, in Radnor Township, Delaware, Pennsylvania.
