= 1908 U.S. National Championships – Men's singles =

Men's singles
- 1908 U.S. National Championships

Final
- Champion: (United States) William Larned
- Runner-up: (United States) Beals Wright
- Score: 6–1, 6–2, 8–6

Events
Singles	men	women
Doubles	men	women
← 1907 ·	U.S. National Championships	· 1909 →

Defending champion William Larned won the Challenge Round against Beals Wright 6–1, 6–2, 8–6 to capture the men's singles tennis title at the 1908 U.S. National Championships. Wright had defeated Fred Alexander in the All Comers' Final.

The event was held at the Newport Casino in Newport, R.I. in the United States. There were more than 128 players in the draw.

== Challenge round ==
Challenge Round
(United States) William Larned	6	6	8
(United States) Beals Wright	1	2	6

== All Comers' finals ==
Quarterfinals
(United States) Fred Alexander	6	6	6
(United States) Frank Sulloway	1	3	1
(United States) Gus Touchard	1	6	0
(United States) William Clothier	6	8	6
(United States) Nat Emerson	6	10	6	2	9
(United States) Jed Jones	8	8	1	6	7
(United States) Beals Wright	6	6	6
(United States) Henry Torrance	3	1	3

Semifinals
(United States) Fred Alexander	7	7	6
(United States) William Clothier	5	5	3
(United States) Nat Emerson	2	4	7	3
(United States) Beals Wright	6	6	5	6

Finals
(United States) Fred Alexander	3	3	3
(United States) Beals Wright	6	6	6

== Earlier rounds ==
1st round - F. Day (United States) d. (United States) G. Frank 10-8,6-2,6-1
J. Cushman (United States) d. (United States) E. Hale w/o
W. Clothier (United States) d. (United States) R. Little 6-2,6-2,6-3
I. Wright (United States) d. (United States) H. Thomas 6-1,6-1,6-1
N. Niles (United States) d. (United States) S. Fahnstock 6-0,6-2,6-0
L. Parrish (United States) d. (United States) T. Potter w/o
J. Ames (United States) d. (United States) P. Randolph 6-0,6-3,6-0
C. Biddle (United States) d. (United States) D. Miller w/o
W. Davidson (United States) d. (United States) H. Peters w/o
A. Sands (United States) d. (United States) E. Hoffman 6-0,6-3,6-1
J. Colston (United States) d. (United States) T. Trask w/o
E. Blair (United States) d. (United States) G. Phelps 8-6,8-6,7-9,5-7,7-5
N. Emerson (United States) d. (United States) L. Hoyt w/o
F. Inman (United States) d. (United States) W. Temis w/o
R. Livingston (United States) d. (United States) C. Plimpton w/o
C. Bull (United States) d. (United States) P. Lydig w/o
E. Whitney (United States) d. (United States) D. Nickols 6-4,6-0,6-3

2nd round - R. Wigham (United States) d. (United States) R. Terry w/o
S. Hinckley (United States) d. (United States) W. Isglin 6-0,6-1,6-0
T. Miller (United States) d. (United States) G. Gallatin w/o
D. Mathey (United States) d. (United States) W. Pate 6-2,6-0,6-2
R. Pearson (United States) d. (United States) F. Seabury w/o
F. Alexander (United States) d. (United States) E. Torrey 6-0,6-2,6-2
M. White (United States) d. (United States) S. Williams w/o
G. Beals (United States) d. (United States) H. Stiness w/o
H. Martin (United States) d. (United States) T. Ridgeway 6-3,6-2,6-4
B. M. Grant (United States) d. (United States) B. Hoffman w/o
H. Pell (United States) d. (United States) R. Sard 8-6,6-0,6-2
A. Hoskins (United States) d. (United States) H. Holt w/o
F. Sulloway (United States) d. (United States) F. Anderson w/o
P. Hawk (United States) d. (United States) H. Rowe 6-3,6-3,6-1
R. LeRoy (United States) d. (United States) C. Hatch w/o
F. Watrous (United States) d. (United States) J. Darragh 6-4,6-0,6-0
G. Wagner (United States) d. (United States) H. Slocum 7-5,6-3,2-6,2-6,6-1
N. Thornton (United States) d. (United States) L. Burt 5-7,8-6,6-2,7-5
R. Agassiz (United States) d. (United States) C. Sands w/o
G. Touchard (United States) d. (United States) D. Dilworth 6-2,6-3,6-2
A. Westfall (United States) d. (United States) R. Hardy 7-5,6-2,7-5
A. Dabney (United States) d. (United States) A. Gammell 6-1,-63,6-1
W. Jordan (United States) d. (United States) E. Pittman 6-0,6-1,6-0
S. Russ (United States) d. (United States) A. Baker w/o
R. Wilson (United States) d. (United States) R. Seaver w/o
W. Rosenbaum (United States) d. (United States) G. Adee w/o
A. Ingraham (United States) d. (United States) S. Henshaw 6-1,6-8,6-3,6-3
G. Church (United States) d. (United States) F. Day 6-1,6-0,6-1
W. Clothier (United States) d. (United States) J. Cushman 6-2,6-0,6-3
I. Wright (United States) d. (United States) N. Niles 6-8,6-3,6-2,7-5
J. Ames (United States) d. (United States) L. Parrish 6-1,7-5,6-0
C. Biddle (United States) d. (United States) W. Davidson 6-3,6-2,6-2
J. Colston (United States) d. (United States) A. Sands 6-0,6-3,6-3
N. Emerson (United States) d. (United States) E. Blair 5-7,7-5,6-4,6-1
F. Inman (United States) d. (United States) R. Livingston 6-1,6-2,6-1
C. Bull (United States) d. (United States) E. Whitney 6-2,2-6,3-6,6-3,6-0
C. Clarke (United States) d. (United States) V. Sorchan w/o
M. Fielding (United States) d. (United States) L. Waidner w/o
L. Jennings (United States) d. (United States) H. Davis w/o
G. Nettleton (United States) d. (United States) E. Page 6-2,6-1,6-2
A. Thayer (United States) d. (United States) A. Baker w/o
R. Stevens (United States) d. (United States) T. Tailer w/o
B. Penniman (United States) d. (United States) R. Brooks w/o
S. Johnson (United States) d. (United States) F. Burnham w/o
H. Johnson (United States) d. (United States) G. Thompson w/o
J. Jones (United States) d. (United States) T. Pell w/o
H. Tallant (United States) d. (United States) G. Thomas 6-3,6-3,6-4
M. Charlock (United States) d. (United States) J. Phipps w/o
W. Johnson (United States) d. (United States) R. Palmer 3-6,6-4,6-4,6-1
C. Cooke (United States) d. (United States) E. Stille 6-3,6-3,6-4
B. Wright (United States) d. (United States) M. Chace 6-3,6-1,6-4
W. Connell (United States) d. (United States) R. Palmer w/o
N. Johnson (United States) d. (United States) S. Merrihew 6-3,6-8,6-4,2-6,6-1
C. Hale (United States) d. (United States) S. French 6-1,6-1,6-0
G. Allison (United States) d. (United States) C. Frailey 6-3,6-4,6-1
R. Gambrill (United States) d. (United States) E. MacEnroe w/o
A. Butler (United States) d. (United States) H. Harriman w/o
M. Babcock (United States) d. (United States) T. Knapp w/o
H. Torrance (United States) d. (United States) B. Buckwalter 6-3,6-3,6-3
W. Trotter (United States) d. (United States) A. Thurber 8-6,6-1,6-4
A. Stillman (United States) d. (United States) W. Bourne 6-0,6-2,6-1
H. MacKinney (United States) d. (United States) D. Appleton 8-6,6-1,6-0
R. Thomas (United States) d. (United States) E. Donn 6-2,6-2,3-6,6-1
R. James (United States) d. (United States) H. Fortescue w/o

3rd round - S. Hinckley (United States) d. (United States) R. Wigham 6-0,6-0,6-1
D. Mathey (United States) d. (United States) T. Miller w/o
F. Alexander (United States) d. (United States) R. Pearson 6-0,6-3,6-4
G. Beals (United States) d. (United States) M. White w/o
H. Martin (United States) d. (United States) B. M. Grant w/o
A. Hoskins (United States) d. (United States) H. Pell 6-3,6-4,0-6,6-4
F. Sulloway (United States) d. (United States) P. Hawk 6-4,6-2,6-3
R. LeRoy (United States) d. (United States) F. Watrous 6-2,8-6,6-4
N. Thornton (United States) d. (United States) G. Wagner 8-6,6-3,4-6,7-5
G. Touchard (United States) d. (United States) R. Agassiz w/o
A. Westfall (United States) d. (United States) A. Dabney 7-5,6-2,6-2
S. Russ (United States) d. (United States) W. Jordan 6-2,6-2,6-3
W. Rosenbaum (United States) d. (United States) R. Wilson 6-3,6-3,3-6,6-3
G. Church (United States) d. (United States) A. Ingraham 6-4,6-4,6-3
W. Clothier (United States) d. (United States) I. Wright 7-5,6-2,7-5
J. Ames (United States) d. (United States) C. Biddle 2-6,6-4,6-3,6-3
N. Emerson (United States) d. (United States) J. Colston 6-2,8-6,6-3
C. Bull (United States) d. (United States) F. Inman 6-2,6-2,8-6
M. Fielding (United States) d. (United States) C. Clarke 6-0,6-1,6-2
G. Nettleton (United States) d. (United States) L. Jennings 6-2,6-0,6-1
R. Stevens (United States) d. (United States) A. Thayer 6-4,6-0,6-1
S. Johnson (United States) d. (United States) B. Penniman 6-1,6-0,6-1
J. Jones (United States) d. (United States) H. Johnson 6-2,6-3,12-10
H. Tallant (United States) d. (United States) M. Charlock 6-3,6-8,6-3,6-2
W. Johnson (United States) d. (United States) C. Cooke 6-1,6-3,6-1
B. Wright (United States) d. (United States) W. Connell 6-1,6-1,6-2
C. Hale (United States) d. (United States) N. Johnson 0-6,6-0,6-8,9-7,7-5
R. Gambrill (United States) d. (United States) G. Allison w/o
A. Butler (United States) d. (United States) M. Babcock 2-6,4-6,6-1,6-3,6-0
H. Torrance (United States) d. (United States) W. Trotter 6-2,7-5,6-3
A. Stillman (United States) d. (United States) H. MacKinney 6-0,6-1,6-8,6-1
R. James (United States) d. (United States) R. Thomas 6-1,6-4,6-3

4th round - D. Mathey (United States) d. (United States) S. Hinckley 5-7,6-4,6-4,6-3
F. Alexander (United States) d. (United States) G. Beals 6-1,8-6,6-0
H. Martin (United States) d. (United States) A. Hoskins 6-4,5-7,4-6,6-1,6-3
F. Sulloway (United States) d. (United States) R. LeRoy 5-7,4-6,6-4,7-5,9-7
G. Touchard (United States) d. (United States) N. Thornton 6-4,5-7,8-6,12-10
A. Westfall (United States) d. (United States) S. Russ 6-1,3-6,6-1,6-3
G. Church (United States) d. (United States) W. Rosenbaum 6-2,1-6,6-4,6-3
W. Clothier (United States) d. (United States) J. Ames 6-2,6-2,6-1
N. Emerson (United States) d. (United States) C. Bull 6-2,4-6,6-2,6-1
G. Nettleton (United States) d. (United States) M. Fielding 6-1,6-3,6-3
R. Stevens (United States) d. (United States) S. Johnson 9-7,6-1,6-0
J. Jones (United States) d. (United States) H. Tallant 5-7,2-6,6-4,6-2,6-2
B. Wright (United States) d. (United States) W. Johnson 6-4,7-5,6-2
C. Hale (United States) d. (United States) R. Gambrill 6-2,7-5,6-2
H. Torrance (United States) d. (United States) A. Butler 6-3,6-0,6-1
R. James (United States) d. (United States) A. Stillman 3-6,6-4,6-2,8-6

5th round - F. Alexander (United States) d. (United States) D. Mathey 7-5,6-3,6-4
F. Sulloway (United States) d. (United States) H. Martin 1-6,7-5,6-0,6-4
G. Touchard (United States) d. (United States) A. Westfall 6-8,2-6,6-2,6-2,7-5
W. Clothier (United States) d. (United States) G. Church 6-2,6-2,6-1
N. Emerson (United States) d. (United States) G. Nettleton 6-2,4-6,6-2,6-1
J. Jones (United States) d. (United States) R. Stevens 6-1,6-1,6-2
B. Wright (United States) d. (United States) C. Hale 6-1,6-1,6-1
H. Torrance (United States) d. (United States) R. James 6-4,6-2,6-3

Preceded by 1908 Wimbledon Championships – Men's singles	Grand Slam men's singles	Succeeded by 1909 Australasian Championships – Men's singles
