= George H. Nettleton =

American railroad pioneer and civil engineer (1831–1896)

George H. Nettleton (November 13, 1831 – March 26, 1896) was an American railroad pioneer and civil engineer from Chicopee, Massachusetts. He served as civil engineer for the Kansas City Bridge project, later called the Hannibal Bridge on the Hannibal and St. Joseph Railroad. He organized the first Kansas City Missouri Stockyards, built the Livestock Exchange building, and served as president of the Fort Scott & Memphis Railway.

== Early years ==
Nettleton was born in Chicopee Falls, Massachusetts to Alpheus Nettleton (a Congregational church leader) and Deborah (Belcher) Nettleton.

Nettleton left Massachusetts to study civil engineering and mathematics in Troy, New York at Rensselaer Polytechnic Institute. After a year of studying, and his family struggling to afford the school, he returned home.

== Career ==
With a passion for the railroad industry, Nettleton worked for the New Haven & New London Railroad as a laborer. Upon completion of the New Haven and New London line, Chief Engineer Josiah Hunt hand-picked Nettleton to head west to work on the Terre Haute & Alton Railroad.

In 1872, Nettleton became the general superintendent of the Atchison, Topeka & Santa Fe Railroad, and from his headquarters in Topeka, Kansas, supervised the line’s extension as far as the state’s western border.

Nettleton died at the age of 64 on March 26, 1896.

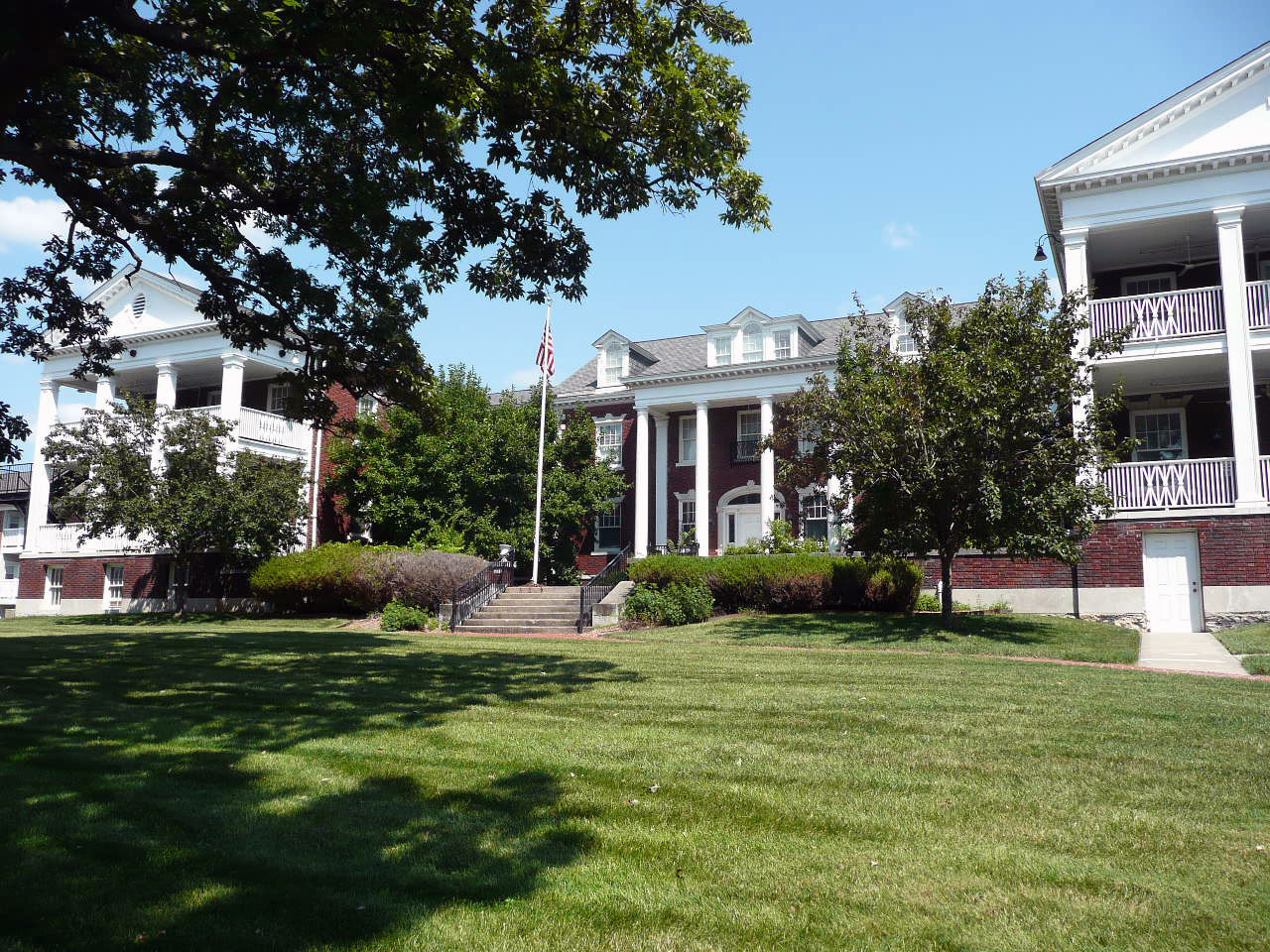
George H. Nettleton Home (Aug. 2015)

== See also ==
- Chicopee, Missouri

== Sources ==
- Sandy, Wilda (1984). Here Lies Kansas City. Kansas City, MO: Bennett Schneider.
