= Frank Jones Sulloway =

American tennis player

Francis Jones Sulloway
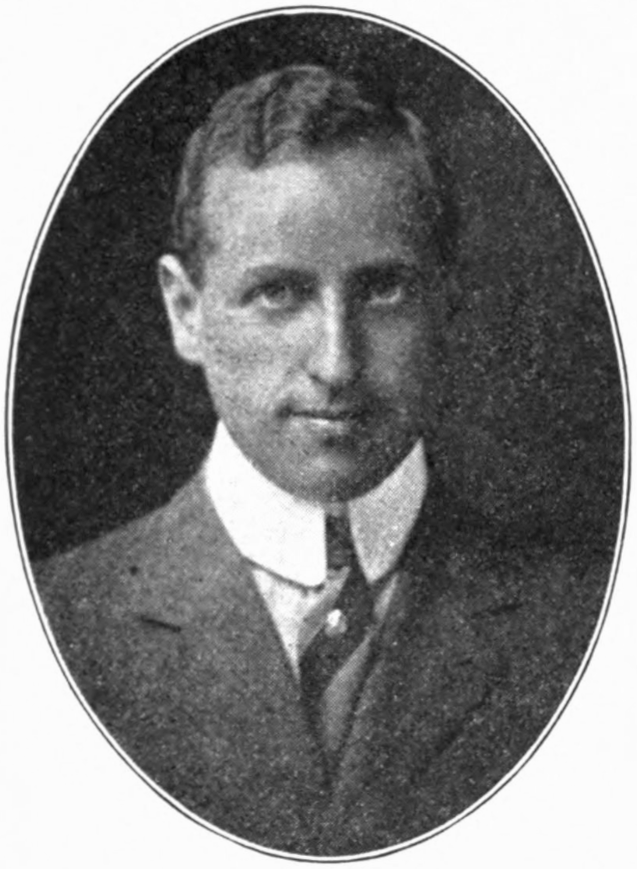
- Country (sports): United States
- Born: December 11, 1883; Franklin, New Hampshire
- Died: July 22, 1981 (aged 97); Concord, New Hampshire

Singles

Grand Slam singles results
- US Open: QF (1908)

Frank Jones Sulloway (December 11, 1883 – July 22, 1981) was an American tennis player active in the early 20th century.

== Biography ==
He was born on December 11, 1883, in Franklin, New Hampshire. He attended Harvard University and Harvard Law School.

Sulloway reached the quarterfinals of the U.S. National Championships in 1908 and made the third round a further four times. He died on July 22, 1981, in Concord, New Hampshire.

== Grand Slam tournament performance timeline ==
Key
| W | F | SF | QF | #R | RR | Q# | DNQ | A | NH |

(W) winner; (F) finalist; (SF) semifinalist; (QF) quarterfinalist; (#R) rounds 4, 3, 2, 1; (RR) round-robin stage; (Q#) qualification round; (DNQ) did not qualify; (A) absent; (NH) not held; (SR) strike rate (events won / competed); (W–L) win–loss record.

| Tournament | 1905 | 1906 | 1908 | 1909 | 1910 | 1912 |
|---|---|---|---|---|---|---|
Grand Slam tournaments
| Australian Open | A | A | A | A | A | A |
| Wimbledon | A | A | A | A | A | A |
| US Open | 3R | 3R | QF | 3R | 3R | Q1 |

== Legacy ==
He was the grandfather of psychologist Frank Sulloway.
