= William Clothier (tennis) =

American tennis player (1881-1962)

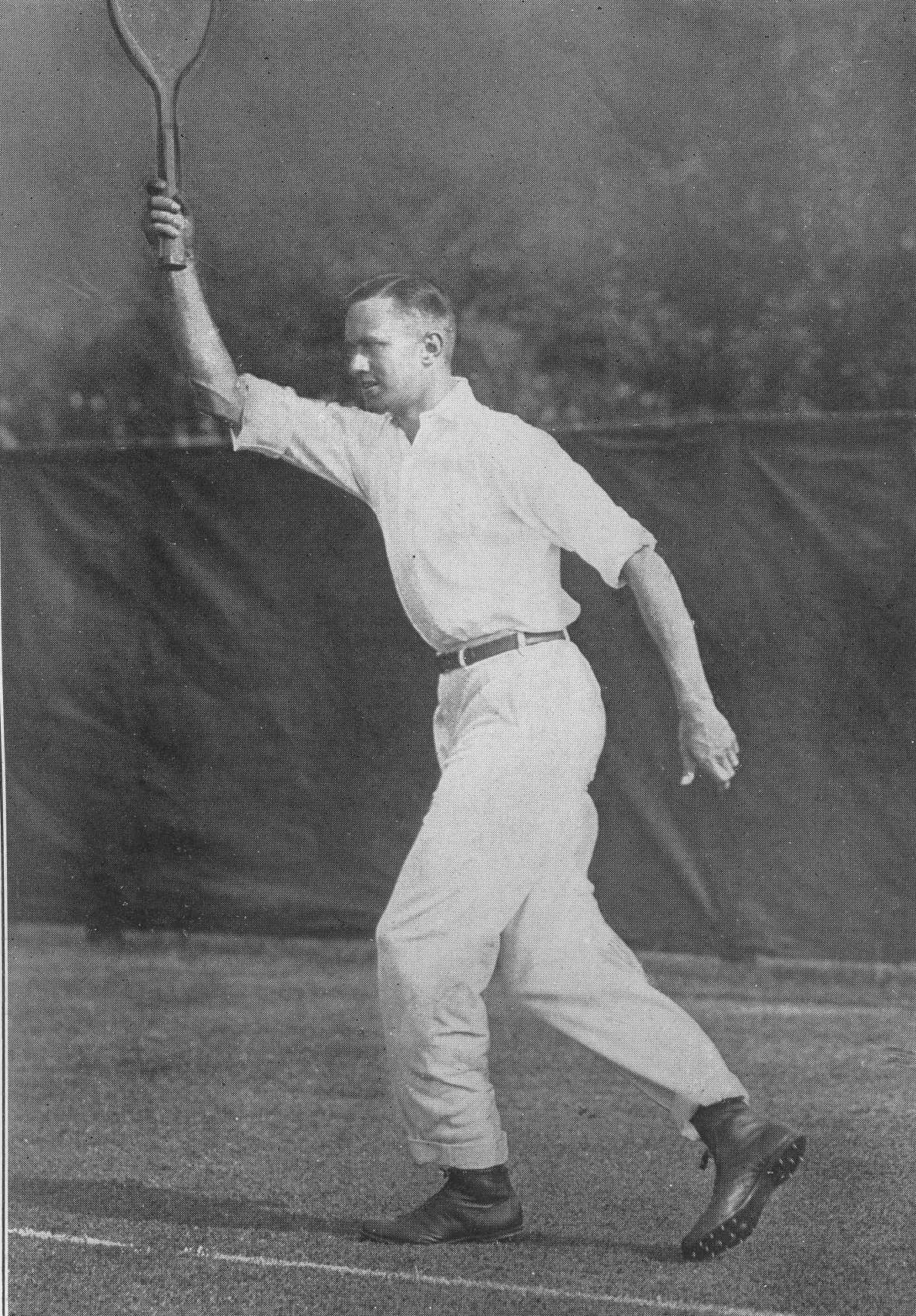
- Full name: William Jackson Clothier
- Country (sports): United States
- Born: September 27, 1881 Sharon Hill, Pennsylvania, U.S.
- Died: September 4, 1962 (aged 80) Valley Forge, Pennsylvania, U.S.
- Plays: Right-handed (one-handed backhand)
- Int. Tennis HoF: 1956 (member page)

Singles
- Highest ranking: No. 4 (1906, ITHF)

Grand Slam singles results
- Wimbledon: 4R (1905)
- US Open: W (1906)

Grand Slam mixed doubles results
- US Open: F (1912)

William 'Bill' Jackson Clothier (September 27, 1881 – September 4, 1962) was an American tennis player. He won the 1906 U.S. National Championships - Men's Singles and was the runner-up in 1907 and 1909. He reached the final round of the 1912 U.S. National Championships in mixed doubles with Eleonora Sears. He was a member of the United States 1905 and 1909 International Lawn Tennis Challenge teams. He was the first president of the International Tennis Hall of Fame and was inducted as a member in 1956.

== Early life and education ==
Clothier was born on September 27, 1881, in Sharon Hill, Pennsylvania. His father Isaac founded the Strawbridge & Clothier department store.

In 1899, he graduated from Haverford School and attended Swarthmore College for two years before transferring to Harvard University. He graduated from Harvard in 1904.

Clothier won the college championship in tennis twice and also played hockey and football.

== Tennis career ==
He was a top American tennis player in the early 1900s and reached the singles final of the United States Championships three times. In his first final appearance in 1904 he lost in three straight sets to compatriot Holcombe Ward. Two years later, in 1906, Clothier achieved his greatest success by emphatically beating Beals Wright in the final in three straight sets at the Newport Casino. This despite breaking his pelvic bone in a riding accident earlier that year. His last appearance in the final came in 1909 when he lost in five sets to William Larned who claimed his fifth singles title.

He was a member of the United States 1905 and 1909 International Lawn Tennis Challenge teams. He won both his singles matches in the 1909 final against the British Isles.

Together with his son, William J. Clothier II, they two won the national father-son title held at Longwood Cricket Club twice in 1935 and 1936.

Clothier was the first president of the International Tennis Hall of Fame in 1954 and later served as chairman of the board. He was elected as a member of the Hall of Fame in 1956. He was inducted into the Harvard Varsity Club Hall of Fame in 1970.

== Business career ==
He was a partner in the investment bank of Montgomery, Clothier & Tyler until 1921. He worked as president of the Boone County Coal Corporation in West Virginia, until 1957.

He died on September 4, 1962, at his home in Valley Forge, Pennsylvania, and was interred at West Laurel Hill Cemetery in Bala Cynwyd, Pennsylvania.

== Playing style ==
In their book R.F. and H.L. Doherty - On Lawn Tennis (1903) multiple Wimbledon champions Reginald and Lawrence Doherty described Clothier's playing style:

Clothier has copied Whitman, but is not so good. His twist service is much the same as Whitman's, and he always follows it up to the net, He volleys well, and is especially severe overhead. His volleying is considerably superior to his ground strokes.

On Lawn Tennis - 1903

== Grand Slam finals ==
=== Singles (1 title, 2 runners-up) ===
Result	Year	Championship	Surface	Opponent	Score
Win	1906	U.S. National Championships	Grass	(United States) Beals Wright	6–3, 6–0, 6–4
Loss	1907	U.S. National Championships	Grass	(United States) William Larned	w/o
Loss	1909	U.S. National Championships	Grass	(United States) William Larned	1–6, 2–6, 7–5, 6–1, 1–6

=== Mixed doubles: (1 runner-up) ===
Result	Year	Championship	Surface	Partner	Opponents	Score
Loss	1912	U.S. National Championships	Grass	(United States) Eleonora Sears	(United States) Mary Kendall Browne (United States) Richard Williams	4–6, 6–2, 9–11

== Grand Slam performance timeline ==
Key
W	F	SF	QF	#R	RR	Q#	DNQ	A	NH

(W) winner; (F) finalist; (SF) semifinalist; (QF) quarterfinalist; (#R) rounds 4, 3, 2, 1; (RR) round-robin stage; (Q#) qualification round; (DNQ) did not qualify; (A) absent; (NH) not held; (SR) strike rate (events won / competed); (W–L) win–loss record.

Events with a challenge round: (W_{C}) won; (CR) lost the challenge round; (F_{A}) all comers' finalist

	1896	1897	1898	1899	1900	1901	1902	1903	1904	1905	1906	1907	1908	1909	1910	1911	1912	1913	1914	1915	1916	1917	1918	1919	1920	1921	1922	SR	W–L	Win %
Grand Slam tournaments
French	Only for French club members																			Not held					OF	OF	OF	0 / 0	0–0	–
Wimbledon	A	A	A	A	A	A	A	A	A	4R	A	A	A	A	A	A	A	A	A	Not held				A	A	A	A	0 / 1	2–1	66.7
U.S.	1R	1R	2R	1R	2R	QF	4R	F_{A}	F	QF	W_{C}	A	SF	CR	A	A	SF	QF	SF	A	3R	A	A	A	A	4R	3R	1 / 20	58–18	76.3
Australian	Not held									A	A	A	A	A	A	A	A	A	A	A	Not held			A	A	A	A	0 / 0	0–0	–
Win–loss	0–1	0–1	1–1	0–1	0–1	3–1	1–1	5–1	6–1	6–2	7–0	0–0	6–1	5–1	0–0	0–0	5–1	4–1	4–1	0–0	3–1	0–0	0–0	0–0	0–0	2–1	2–1	1 / 21	60–19	75.9
