= George Adee =

American football player and tennis official (1874–1948)

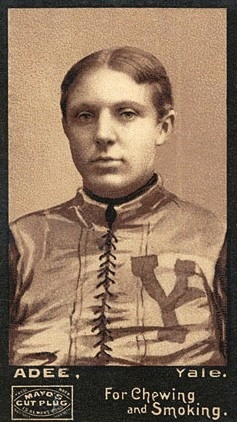

Profile
- Position: Quarterback

Personal information
- Born: January 4, 1874; Stonington, Connecticut, U.S.
- Died: July 31, 1948 (aged 74); Manhattan, New York, U.S.

Career information
- College: Yale (1892–1894)

Awards and highlights
- Consensus All-American (1894); International Tennis Hall of Fame

George Townsend Adee (January 4, 1874 – July 31, 1948) was an American football player and tennis player and official. He was the quarterback of the undefeated national champion 1894 Yale Bulldogs football team and was selected as the first-team quarterback on the 1894 All-America college football team.

== Early life ==
Adee was born in Stonington, Connecticut, in 1874. He was the son of George Augustus Adee, a prominent New York banker, and the former Adelaide Palmer Stanton. His parents were both descendants of colonial settlers. He attended the Harrington School in Westchester.

== Yale ==
Adee enrolled at Yale University in 1891. He was the quarterback of the 1893 and 1894 Yale Bulldogs football teams. He led the 1893 team to a 10–1 record and the 1894 team to a perfect 16–0 record. The 1894 team has been recognized as the 1894 national champion by the Billingsley Report, the Helms Athletic Foundation, and the National Championship Foundation. At the end of the 1894 season, Adee was selected by both Walter Camp and Caspar Whitney as the first-team quarterback on the 1894 All-America college football team.

In the spring of 1895, Adee served as the manager of Yale's varsity crew and was named president of the Yale Navy. Adee received a bachelor of arts degree from Yale in June 1895.

Adee remained active in Yale organizations throughout his life, including service on the Yale Athletic Advisory Committee and as president of the Yale Club of New York. In 1931, Yale honored him with an honorary Master of Arts degree for leadership in connection with Yale athletics.

== Tennis ==
Adee was also a leader in organizing amateur tennis in the United States. He played six times in the USA singles championship between 1903 and 1909. He also served as president of the United States Lawn Tennis Association from 1916 to 1919. He was also a member of the Davis Cup and Amateur Rules Committees. In 1964, he was inducted into the International Tennis Hall of Fame.

== Military service and later years ==
Adee served in the U.S. Army in the Spanish–American War and World War I. He held the rank of major in the infantry during World War I. He participated in the St. Mihiel drive and the Meuse–Argonne offensive. He sustained injuries in a German gas attack.

Adee spent his professional career on Wall Street. He began with the firm of Cuyler, Morgan & Co with whom he worked for four years. He then formed the firm of Batcheller & Adee with George E. Batcheller. The firm later became Batcheller, Adee & Rawlins. He was later a partner in Reynolds, Fish & Co. from 1928 to 1944. He concluded his career as a partner in the New York Stock Exchange firm of Mallory, Adee & Co.

Adee was married in 1946 to Katherine Comly Taller. He died at his home at 2 Beekman Place in New York, New York, in 1948 at age 74.
