= 1947 Australian Championships – Men's singles =

Men's singles
- 1947 Australian Championships

Final
- Champion: (Australia) Dinny Pails
- Runner-up: (Australia) John Bromwich
- Score: 4–6, 6–4, 3–6, 7–5, 8–6

Details
- Draw: 32
- Seeds: 11

Events
Singles	men	women
Doubles	men	women
- Australian Championships

Dinny Pails defeated John Bromwich 4–6, 6–4, 3–6, 7–5, 8–6 in the final to win the men's singles tennis title at the 1947 Australian Championships.

== Seeds ==
The seeded players are listed below. Dinny Pails is the champion; others show the round in which they were eliminated.

1. (Australia) John Bromwich (finalist)
2. (Australia) Dinny Pails (champion)
3. (United States) Tom Brown (semifinals)
4. (United States) Gardnar Mulloy (semifinals)
5. (Australia) Adrian Quist (quarterfinals)
6. (Australia) Lionel Brodie (quarterfinals)
7. (Australia) Bill Sidwell (quarterfinals)
8. (Australia) Colin Long (quarterfinals)
9. (United States) Bill Talbert (second round)
10. (Australia) Geoffrey Brown (second round)
11. (Australia) Jack Crawford (first round)

== Draw ==
=== Key ===
- Q = Qualifier
- WC = Wild card
- LL = Lucky loser
- r = Retired

=== Finals ===
Quarterfinals
1	(Australia) John Bromwich	6	7	4	6
8	(Australia) Colin Long	2	5	6	0
4	(United States) Gardnar Mulloy	6	6	6	5	6
6	(Australia) Lionel Brodie	2	8	2	7	1
5	(Australia) Adrian Quist	6	4	7	2
3	(United States) Tom Brown	8	6	5	6
7	(Australia) Bill Sidwell	3	8	3
2	(Australia) Dinny Pails	6	10	6

Semifinals
1	(Australia) John Bromwich	6	6	1	6
4	(United States) Gardnar Mulloy	2	4	6	4
3	(United States) Tom Brown	2	4	1
2	(Australia) Dinny Pails	6	6	6

Final
1	(Australia) John Bromwich	6	4	6	5	6
2	(Australia) Dinny Pails	4	6	3	7	8

=== Earlier rounds ===
==== Section 1 ====
First round
1	(Australia) Bromwich	6	6	6
(Australia) Skillicorn	2	1	2
(Australia) Gilchrist
(Australia) Hopman	w/o
8	(Australia) Long	6	6	6
(Australia) Gray	3	3	3
(Australia) Worthington	6	6	4	3	10
(Australia) Rocavert	4	4	6	6	8
4	(United States) Mulloy	6	6	4	6	6
(Australia) Dart	8	3	6	0	1
10	(Australia) Brown	6	8	6
(Australia) Wilderspin	2	6	2
6	(Australia) Brodie	7	6	6
(Australia) Barnes	5	3	2
(Australia) Bonner	6	3	6	3	6
(Australia) Maidens	3	6	3	6	1

Second round
1	(Australia) Bromwich	6	6	6
(Australia) Gilchrist	2	2	2
8	(Australia) Long	6	6	8
(Australia) Worthington	1	2	6
4	(United States) Mulloy	4	3	6	6	6
10	(Australia) Brown	6	6	3	4	2
6	(Australia) Brodie	6	6	6
(Australia) Bonner	2	1	4

Quarterfinals
1	(Australia) Bromwich	6	7	4	6
8	(Australia) Long	2	5	6	0
4	(United States) Mulloy	6	6	6	5	6
6	(Australia) Brodie	2	8	2	7	1

Semifinals
1	(Australia) Bromwich	6	6	1	6
4	(United States) Mulloy	2	4	6	4

==== Section 2 ====
First round
(Australia) Matthews	6	6	6
(Australia) Edwards	4	1	3
5	(Australia) Quist	6	6	6
(Australia) Candy	4	1	3
(Australia) Bennett	11	6	6
11	(Australia) Crawford	9	3	0
3	(United States) Brown	6	6	6
(Australia) Felan	1	2	2
9	(United States) Talbert	6	6	6
(Australia) McCarthy	0	1	0
7	(Australia) Sidwell	6	6
(Australia) Stewart	2	1
(Australia) Callaghan	6	9	6
(Australia) Sedgman	4	7	4
2	(Australia) Pails	6	6	6
(Australia) Kirkby	3	1	0

Second round
(Australia) Matthews	1	8	2
5	(Australia) Quist	6	10	6
(Australia) Bennett	6	5	6	4
3	(United States) Brown	8	7	3	6
9	(United States) Talbert	1	2	6	3
7	(Australia) Sidwell	6	6	3	6
(Australia) Callaghan	1	3	1
2	(Australia) Pails	6	6	6

Quarterfinals
5	(Australia) Quist	6	4	7	2
3	(United States) Brown	8	6	5	6
7	(Australia) Sidwell	3	8	3
2	(Australia) Pails	6	10	6

Semifinals
3	(United States) Brown	2	4	1
2	(Australia) Pails	6	6	6

Preceded by 1946 U.S. National Championships	Grand Slam men's singles	Succeeded by 1947 Wimbledon Championships
