= List of multi-sport athletes =

A multi-sport athlete is an athlete who competes or trains two or more different sports. Most of these athletes played two or more sports from a young age – especially in high school – before deciding to usually concentrate on just one sport professionally.

Playing multiple sports appears to improve performance through development of foundational transferable athletic skills. A large majority of elite young adult athletes, such as NCAA Division I athletes and first-round NFL draft picks, were multi-sport athletes, even if they specialized in a single sport during their professional career, and many played multiple sports even through the end of high school. Most elite athletes who eventually specialized avoided early sports specialization, so they did not specialize or begin intensive training until they were older teenagers. Elite athletes in most sports, such as track and field, weightlifting, cycling, rowing, swimming, skiing, are less likely to have done intensive training at a young age than the near-elite athletes. NCAA Division I athletes tended to play multiple sports in high school, and only one in six specialized in a single sport before the age of 12. In the 2015 NFL Scouting Combine, six out of seven invited college athletes were multi-sport athletes in high school.

== List of athletes ==
Below is a list of multi-sport athletes who have played in at least one sport professionally, listed by primary athletic occupation, with notes on their secondary sport or sports.

=== Association football ===
- Clive Allen – played football for Tottenham Hotspur and American football for the London Monarchs as a placekicker
- Bruce Arena – played for the United States men's national soccer team and also played for the US national lacrosse team which won the 1974 World Lacrosse Championship and finished runner up in 1978.
- Andrei Bărbulescu – played football at international level for Romania with whom he participated in the 1938 World Cup; also played ice hockey, representing the national team during the 1947 Ice Hockey World Championships.
- Devin Barclay – former placekicker for the Ohio State Buckeyes, after a five-year stint in MLS.
- Can Bartu – played football for Fenerbahçe, Fiorentina, Venezia and Lazio. He scored 211 goals in 426 matches. Played 26 times for Turkish national football team. He also played for Fenerbahçe Basketball Team in his early career. And played 6 times for Turkish National Basketball Team.
- George Biehl – better known for playing football from 1988 to 1999 in the Chilean Primera División and previously he competed in 110 metres hurdles and decathlon from 1980 to 1987.
- Santiago Cañizares – played football from 1988 to 2008, most prominently for Valencia, before beginning to compete in the Spanish Rally Championship.
- Petr Čech – football goalkeeper from 1999 to 2019 with 443 appearances in the Premier League who became a goaltender in the English ice hockey leagues after retirement and played in the Elite Ice Hockey League for Belfast Giants.
- Sever Coracu – played football including for Romania's national team; also won the Romanian national title at 200 metres sprint in 1939.
- Félix Corte – known for his football career in Italy and Chile, at the same time he developed a professional career in fencing.
- Vintilă Cristescu – played football for Colțea București, and was also a long-distance runner who won five national marathon championships and competed during the 1928 Summer Olympics.
- Aldo Donelli – member of the National Soccer Hall of Fame. Played 11 games in the NFL for the Pittsburgh Steelers in the early 1940s.
- Alfred Eisenbeisser – played football at international level for Romania's national team, and he was also a figure skater who competed in two editions of the European Figure Skating Championship and during the 1936 Winter Olympics.
- Luis Enrique – completed three marathons between 2006 and 2008 and also completed Frankfurt Ironman.
- Olga Færseth – played both for the Iceland women's national football team and the Iceland women's national basketball team.
- Mihai Flamaropol – played football (from 1938 to 1953), won league titles and earned caps for Romania; also played ice hockey (from 1936 to 1959), won league titles and represented for Romania's ice hockey national team.
- Chuni Goswami – played football for India national football team and Mohun Bagan A.C. as striker (during 1946 to 1968) and Cricket for Bengal as an All-rounder (during 1962–1973). He captained both the football and cricket teams.
- Knut Anders Fostervold – Had a 12-year-long football career, including playing in the Champions League, and also participated in the Cycling Road World Championships in 2006
- Toni Fritsch – Ex-player for Rapid Vienna and the Austria national team played in the NFL as a kicker from 1971 to 1982, and in the USFL from 1984 to 1985. He won a ring from Super Bowl VI (Cowboys), became an NFL All-Pro in 1979 (Oilers) and a USFL All-League in 1984 (Gamblers).
- Andy Goram – double internationalist in football & cricket best known as former Scotland Goalkeeper with 43 caps Andy had a long football career with Bury, Hibernian, Rangers, Motherwell and Manchester United also represented Scotland at cricket in the 1989 & 1991 Nat West Trophy
- Elemer Hirsch – played football including internationally for Romania, and he also played ice hockey and won three Romanian national figure skating titles.
- Geoff Hurst – World Cup-winning international footballer who also played a first-class match cricket match for Essex.
- Manuel Ibarra – played football from 1994 to 2008 and represented Chile at the 2000 Summer Olympics, becoming a boxer.
- Bondoc Ionescu-Crum – played football and won a league title; also competed in the men's long jump during the 1936 Summer Olympics.
- Harold Jarman – played for Bristol Rovers for most of his professional football career. Also played first class cricket for Gloucestershire.
- Florian Kempf – former soccer player for the Philadelphia Fury of the North American Soccer League and the Pennsylvania Stoners of the American Soccer League, and the NFL placekicker.
- Josh Lambo – former MLS goalkeeper before becoming a placekicker in the NFL for the San Diego Chargers, Jacksonville Jaguars and Tennessee Titans. Lambo last played in the NFL in 2022.
- Carlos Lampe – Bolivia national football team goalkeeper. Also played basketball for Real Santa Cruz and played Liga Sudamericana de Básquetbol.
- Younis Mahmoud – played basketball for Kahraba Al-Dibis in the Iraqi first and second divisions as a shooting guard until 1996 when he decided to focus on football.
- Paolo Maldini – widely considered one of best defenders in football history, later became a pro tennis player
- Alex McGrath – played first-class cricket before switching to football
- Leon McKenzie – played 40 games in the Premier League for Norwich City and Crystal Palace, scoring 7 goals. Currently has a record of 8–0–1 as a professional boxer.
- Tony Meola – former soccer player in American Professional Soccer League, Major League Soccer, and Major Indoor Soccer League. After his soccer career he attempted to become a placekicker for the New York Jets but was cut after tryouts. He also played high school basketball and high school baseball and was drafted out of high school by the MLB's New York Yankees, but declined the contract.
- Alfonso Morales – better known for playing football from 1958 to 1970, he previously played water polo, being called up to the Chile squad in 1958.
- Kevin Moran – played 71 games for the Republic of Ireland national football team. Also won two All-Ireland Gaelic football championships with Dublin, in 1976 and 1977.
- Jón Oddsson – was a member of both the Icelandic men's national football team and the Iceland track and field national team. Also played three seasons in the Icelandic top-tier basketball league.
- Mircea Oprea – played football in the Romanian top-league and also practiced handball in the Romanian second league.
- Rodrigo Palacio – former Inter Milan player and Copa Libertadores winner, currently playing for a fourth tier Italian basketball team.
- Sixto Peralta – former professional footballer; also practiced basketball in the Argentine lower leagues.
- Ivan Perišić – runner-up in the 2018 FIFA World Cup with Croatia. Also represented Croatia in beach volleyball at the Porec Major event.
- Florentin Petre – played football at international level for Romania; also practiced rallying, and became champion of Bulgaria in 2010.
- Andrei Rădulescu – played football at international level for Romania; also played basketball in Romanian regional championships.
- Robert Sadowski – played football at international level for Romania with whom he participated in the 1938 World Cup; also played ice hockey, representing the national team during three World Championships.
- Harvey Sarajian – forward who also played as a placekicker for Georgia Southern Eagles football.
- Vanda Sigurgeirsdóttir – played both for the Icelandic women's national football team and the Icelandic women's national basketball team.
- Clare Taylor – played 121 matches for the England women's cricket team; also played the 1995 FIFA Women's World Cup for the England women's national football team.
- Andrew Thomas – goalkeeper who represented the England cricket team at the U17 level.
- Ron Tindall – played football for Chelsea and Portsmouth and also played first-class cricket for Surrey.
- Taylor Twellman – played 30 games for the United States men's national soccer team. Also worked out with the Kansas City Royals who offered him a contract which he declined in favor of a soccer scholarship from the University of Maryland.
- Rafael van der Vaart – played 109 games for the Netherlands national football team before becoming a darts player on the British Darts Organisation circuit.
- Arthur Wharton – an all-round sportsman – in 1886, he equalled the amateur world record of 10 seconds for the 100-yard sprint in the AAA championship. He was also a keen cyclist and cricketer, playing for local teams in Yorkshire and Lancashire. However, Wharton is best remembered for his exploits as a footballer; Wharton was the first mixed-heritage footballer to turn professional.
- Curtis Woodhouse – played 3 games in the Premier League for Birmingham City. Woodhouse was the British light-welterweight boxing champion and retired with a 22–7 record as a professional.
- Lev Yashin – played football, bandy, and ice hockey internationally for the Soviet Union, a goalkeeper in all three sports.

=== Australian rules football ===
- Tadgh Kennelly – Irish born three-sport champion, the first player to win an All-Ireland Senior Football Championship in gaelic football (for Kerry), and an AFL Premiership in Australian rules football (for Sydney), both effectively the highest available honours in their sports. In addition, he led Ireland to victory over Australia in the international rules football series, a third hybrid sport drawing from both gaelic football and Australian rules football to allow international recognition and competition in both codes which as sports are each heavily centred on their countries of origin, but which share a large number of similar features (in particular the lack of an offsides rule and a multiple form of points scoring).
- Pat O'Dea – played Australian rules football for the Melbourne Football Club in the Victorian Football Association (VFA), and college football for University of Wisconsin–Madison as a fullback.
- Wayne Athorne – competed for Australia in Decathlon at the 1966 British Empire and Commonwealth Games.
- George Blake – competed for Australia in running events at the 1908 Summer Olympics.
- Ashleigh Brazill – concurrently plays in the Super Suncorp National Netball league and AFLW league for Collingwood Football Club.
- Dean Brogan – played for the Adelaide 36ers in the National Basketball League winning a championship in 1998. Became the first player to win an NBL championship and AFL premiership in 2004.
- Mason Cox – played basketball at Oklahoma State University before switching to Australian rules. Currently plays for Collingwood.
- Shane Crothers – played for Geelong in the National Basketball League.
- Jess Duffin – played 117 matches for the Australia women's national cricket team, and played 42 AFL Women's matches.
- Chloe Dalton – played in the WNBL with the Sydney Uni Flames before switching to Rugby 7s where she won Gold at the 2016 Summer Olympics. She now plays for GWS Giants in the AFL Women's where she has played 28 games.
- Bob Edmond – won two silver medal in weight lifting at the 1978 and 1982 Commonwealth Games.
- Hugh Greenwood – played basketball at University of New Mexico before switching to Australian Rules. He currently plays for North Melbourne Football Club.
- Jason Holmes – played basketball at Mississippi Valley State University and Morehead State University before switching to Australian rules. Currently plays for St Kilda.
- Josh Jenkins – played basketball for Townsville Crocodiles before switching to Australian rules.
- Alex Keath – played cricket for Melbourne Stars and Victorian Cricket Team before switching to Australian Rules. He currently plays for Western Bulldogs.
- Bill Lang – Australian national heavyweight boxing champion, who fought for the world heavyweight title, who was also an Australian rules footballer with Richmond in the Victorian Football League (VFL).
- Bill McCabe – competed in water polo at the 1956 Summer Olympics.
- Jim Matthews – competed in the 1947 Australian Championships for tennis.
- Wil Parker – played cricket for Hobart Hurricanes and Victorian Cricket Team. Currently plays for Collingwood Football Club in the Australian Football League.
- Michael Parsons – played for Launceston and West Adelaide in the National Basketball League.
- Mike Pyke – Canada rugby union international who also played in France's Top 14 before switching to Australian rules. Currently plays for Sydney Swans.
- Leslie Rainey – competed in the 1914 and 1924 Australasian Championships for tennis.
- Les Roebuck – competed in the 1914 Australasian Championships for tennis.
- Ken Slater – competed in the 1946 and 1948 Australian Championships for tennis.
- Ron Taylor – competed in boxing at the 1960 Summer Olympics.
- Tom Warhurst – competed in six Australian Championships for tennis.
- Keith Wiegard – competed in water polo at the 1960 Summer Olympics.

=== Baseball ===
- Ed Abbaticchio – played Fullback for the Latrobe Athletic Association from 1895 to 1900.
- Cliff Aberson – played tailback and defensive back for the Green Bay Packers in 1946.
- Anthony Alford – played Quarterback for the University of Southern Mississippi and the University of Mississippi.
- Eddy Alvarez – won a silver medal for the United States at the 2014 Winter Olympic Games in the 5000m Short track speed skating.
- Frank Baumholtz – played two seasons of professional basketball for the Youngstown Bears of the National Basketball League during the 1945–46 season, and the Cleveland Rebels of the Basketball Association of America during the 1946–47 season.
- Mookie Betts – professional bowler who competed in the 9th PBA Tour World Series of Bowling in Reno.
- Medric Boucher – played soccer in the St. Louis Soccer League
- Phil Bradley – University of Missouri quarterback in three bowl games.
- Cliff Brady – played soccer in the St. Louis Soccer League
- Madison Bumgarner – the pitcher for the Arizona Diamondbacks revealed in February 2020 that he has competed in rodeos as a team roper during his Major League Baseball career under the alias Mason Saunders.
- Jamie Burke – was a kicker on Oregon State's football team.
- John Burkett – also a professional bowler currently competing on the PBA50 Tour.
- Sammy Byrd – won six PGA Tour events after retiring from baseball.
- Bobby Byrne – played soccer in the St. Louis Soccer League.
- Charlie Caldwell – pitched 3 games for the New York Yankees. He also played football and basketball at Princeton University; he was elected to the College Football Hall of Fame.
- Tom Candiotti – former knuckleball pitcher was inducted into the International Bowling Hall of Fame.
- Jose Canseco – later competed in boxing and mixed martial arts.
- Cris Carpenter – was a punter for the University of Georgia.
- Tony Clark – played basketball for the University of Arizona and San Diego State.
- Vince Coleman – was a punter/kicker for Florida A&M.
- Gene Conley – three-time National League baseball All-Star with the Milwaukee Braves and Philadelphia Phillies with lifetime 91–96 record on four teams; on three NBA championship teams with the Boston Celtics as a reserve forward.
- Chuck Connors – played basketball for the Boston Celtics from 1946 to 1948 and baseball for the Montreal Royals, Brooklyn Dodgers and Chicago Cubs. Went on to become far more famous as an actor, most notably as the title character in The Rifleman.
- Alvin Dark – played college football at LSU and Southwestern Louisiana Institute.
- Mark DeRosa – played quarterback at the University of Pennsylvania.
- Walter East – played end for the Massillon Tigers in the Ohio League and was a second baseman and manager for various minor league baseball clubs.
- Darin Erstad – punted and placekicked at the University of Nebraska.
- Josh Fields – played quarterback at Oklahoma State.
- Dámaso García – former Major League Baseball player best known for his time spent with the Toronto Blue Jays in the 1980s, and in 1974, he was the Universidad Católica Madre y Maestra soccer team's captain. That year he played too as the captain for the Dominican Republic national football team at XII Central American and Caribbean Games in Santo Domingo.
- Amir Garrett – played basketball for St. John's University
- Steve Garvey – played defensive back at Michigan State University
- Bob Gibson – played on the Harlem Globetrotters from 1957 to 1958 after starring in both baseball and basketball at Creighton.
- Kirk Gibson – 1978 College Football All-America Team wide receiver; drafted by the St. Louis Cardinals football team in the 7th round of the 1979 NFL draft.
- Tom Glavine – was drafted by the Los Angeles Kings in the NHL.
- Dick Groat – played for the Fort Wayne Pistons in the NBA in 1952.
- Gabe Gross – played quarterback for Auburn University
- Frank Grube – St. Louis Browns catcher, played Left End for the 1928 New York Yankees of the National Football League.
- Tony Gwynn – former basketball stand-out at San Diego State who was drafted by both the San Diego Clippers and San Diego Padres on the same day.
- Steve Hamilton – played in the NBA for the Minneapolis Lakers.
- Carroll Hardy – played MLB baseball for eight years and one season in NFL after being a football, baseball and track letterman at University of Colorado.
- Ken Harrelson – as a golfer he competed in the 1972 British Open, and he played golf, baseball, football, and basketball at Benedictine Military School.
- Todd Helton – played quarterback at the University of Tennessee.
- Mark Hendrickson – played four seasons in the NBA.
- Frank Howard – outfielder hit 382 major league home runs, primarily with the Los Angeles Dodgers and Washington Senators; All-America basketball forward at Ohio State University.
- Bo Jackson – won the Heisman Trophy, and was an all-pro in the National Football League and also played on a semi-pro basketball team in Los Angeles before returning to baseball; he was a two-time state champion in the decathlon.
- Ferguson Jenkins – played for the Harlem Globetrotters.
- Jackie Jensen – was a running back and defensive back at University of California, Berkeley.
- Brian Jordan – was a defensive back for the Atlanta Falcons.
- Matt Kinzer – only person to have played for both the Detroit Lions and the Detroit Tigers.
- Sandy Koufax – 12-year MLB HOF career with Dodgers; played basketball and baseball at University of Cincinnati.
- Rick Leach – played quarterback for the University of Michigan and pro baseball for the Toronto Blue Jays, Detroit Tigers, and San Francisco Giants.
- Kenny Lofton – played basketball at the University of Arizona.
- Don Lund – first-round draft pick of the Chicago Bears in 1945 (running back). Played baseball with the Brooklyn Dodgers, St. Louis Browns and the Detroit Tigers. Also played basketball at the University of Michigan.
- Tony Lupien – first baseman for the Boston Red Sox, the Philadelphia Phillies, and the Chicago White Sox who was captain of the Harvard basketball team and a quarterback for his freshman football team.
- Waddy MacPhee – played in MLB for the New York Giants in 1922, and in the NFL for the Providence Steamrollers in 1926.
- Joe Maddon – played football and baseball at Lafayette College.
- J. Marichal – participated as a soltador on the Dominican cockfighting circuit.
- Christy Mathewson – played fullback for Bucknell, and later professionally played for the Greensburg Athletic Association and the Pittsburgh Stars.
- Joe Mauer – played quarterback, point guard, and catcher in high school, and was named USA Today High School Player of the Year twice in the same school year: in 2000 for football and 2001 for baseball.
- Kirk McCaskill – played hockey for the University of Vermont from 1979 to 1983. Drafted in the fourth round (64th overall) by the Winnipeg Jets in the 1981 NHL Entry Draft. Dressed for one game with the Winnipeg Jets of the NHL but did not play in the game. Pitched for the Angels and the White Sox 1985–1996.
- Bill McWilliams – besides playing for the Boston Red Sox 1931 MLB, he played for the Detroit Lions NFL in 1934.
- Mike Miley – quarterback for the LSU Tigers football in the 1974 Orange Bowl and who apparently played other sports
- Ryan Minor – All-America basketball forward at Oklahoma, drafted by the Philadelphia 76ers and played professionally for the Oklahoma City Cavalry of the Continental Basketball Association
- Joe Morgan – MLB and Minor League career as player and manager; standout high school hockey player from Walpole MA and at Boston College.
- Nyjer Morgan – besides playing in the MLB, he played hockey and reached the Major Junior level with the Regina Pats of the Western Hockey League in 1999–2000.
- Justin Morneau – played one preseason game as a goaltender for the Portland Winter Hawks of the WHL.
- Phil Nevin – played kicker at Cal State Fullerton.
- Kyle Parker – was the 26th overall pick of the 2010 Major League Baseball draft, also played quarterback for the Clemson Tigers in 2009 and 2010.
- C. Posey – member of both the Baseball and Basketball Halls of Fame. In baseball, briefly played for the Homestead Grays of the Negro leagues before retiring to become the team's field manager, general manager, and eventual owner, building one of the Negro leagues' strongest organizations. In basketball, was recognized as the best African American player of the first two decades of the 20th century.
- Curtis Pride – played for the U.S. FIFA deaf soccer team in China and played point guard at William & Mary.
- Ron Reed – played in the NBA for the Detroit Pistons.
- Rick Rhoden – played on the senior golf tour now known as PGA Tour Champions, with three top-10 finishes.
- Dave Ricketts – also played in MLB and played basketball with his brother at Duquesne University.
- Dick Ricketts – played for the NBA's St. Louis Hawks, Rochester Royals and Cincinnati Royals.
- Harry Riconda – played professional basketball for several teams including the Original Celtics.
- Robin Roberts – in addition to being a Hall of Fame pitcher, played college basketball for Michigan State University.
- Jackie Robinson – played professional football in the PCPFL, and was a four-sport letterman at UCLA (baseball, basketball, football, track).
- Jeff Samardzija – played high school football, basketball, and baseball. All-American wide receiver at Notre Dame.
- Kevan Smith – played for the Pittsburgh Panthers football team as a quarterback
- Tim Stoddard – member of the 1973–74 N.C. State Wolfpack NCAA Basketball Championship team.
- Matt Szczur – Division I FCS All-American as a receiver and return specialist, also playing as an occasional wildcat quarterback, for the 2009 FCS national champion Villanova Wildcats.
- Ralph Terry – played on PGA Tour Champions (then the Senior PGA Tour), finishing 57th on the money list in 1987.
- Frank Thomas – played football at Auburn University
- Rube Waddell – played for the Philadelphia Athletics' professional football team in 1902.
- Herb Washington – former college sprinter at Michigan State University.
- Dave Winfield – drafted by four professional teams in three different sports – basketball, baseball and American football, before deciding to concentrate on his baseball career. Played baseball and basketball for the University of Minnesota.
- George Wright – pioneering professional baseball player who started his athletic career as a cricketer in the 1860s. He resumed his cricket career after retiring from professional baseball in 1882.
- Harry Wright – the founder and manager of the first professional baseball team, the 1869 Cincinnati Red Stockings; was a professional cricketer before taking up baseball in the late 1850s. George Wright was his younger brother.
- Eric Young Sr. – played college football for the Rutgers Scarlet Kinghts
- Joe Ware – Played college football for the Howard Bison before playing professional baseball in the Negro leagues for four different teams between 1932 and 1935.

=== Basketball ===
- Danny Ainge – NBA All-Star and two-time champion with the Boston Celtics, also played baseball for the Toronto Blue Jays.
- Birgir Örn Birgisson – was a member of the Icelandic national swimming team before turning to basketball where he went on to play 26 games for the Icelandic national basketball team.
- Dean Brogan – played basketball in Australia for the Adelaide 36ers, winning the 1998 NBL Championship, before switching to Australian Rules football for Port Adelaide, winning an AFL premiership in 2004.
- Chase Budinger – began playing beach volleyball professionally in 2018.
- Scott Burrell – played in Minor League Baseball for two years before his NBA career. The one of only two athletes in history to have been drafted in the first round in two of the four major professional sports leagues (MLB and NBA).
- Carlota Castrejana – participates in triple jump
- Wilt Chamberlain – played volleyball in the International Volleyball Association (IVA) for the Seattle Smashers 1974–1979 and was named MVP at the 1975 All Star Game. Went to college on a track and basketball scholarship, competed in high jump, triple jump and shot put as well as running quarter-mile races, and was also offered professional boxing, soccer and American football opportunities.
- Nathaniel Clifton – played baseball in the Negro leagues, before becoming the first African-American to land an NBA contract and stick with a team.
- Gene Conley – three-time National League baseball All-Star with the Milwaukee Braves and Philadelphia Phillies with lifetime 91–96 record on four teams; on three NBA championship teams with the Boston Celtics as a reserve forward.
- Pat Connaughton – played professional baseball in the Baltimore Orioles organization while also playing college basketball at Notre Dame.
- Stephen Curry – also plays golf
- Snake Deal – played half a season with the Cincinnati Reds as a first baseman in 1906.
- Dave DeBusschere – Hall of Famer had a short professional baseball career (1962–1963) as a pitcher for the Chicago White Sox.
- Claudia Dickey – plays soccer
- Elena Delle Donne – 2013 WNBA Rookie of the Year and 2015 WNBA MVP was a top prospect in both basketball and volleyball in high school. She played volleyball in her first year at the University of Delaware in 2008 before returning to basketball the next year.
- Tim Duncan – competitive swimmer in the U.S. Virgin Islands; endeavored to make the 1992 Olympic Games before Hurricane Hugo took out his town's only Olympic size pool.
- Scott English – he played in the NBA and ABA prior to joining the IVA.
- Keith Erickson – he attended UCLA on a shared baseball and basketball scholarship and also played on the 1964 U.S. Men's Olympic Volleyball Team, then going to the NBA.
- Constantin Herold – played basketball, winning a Romanian League title and representing Romania's national team; he also competed in 13 other sports: Athletics – school, junior, university and national champion in several events, national junior record breaker (110 metres hurdles, pole, triple jump), national champion in seniors (110 metres hurdles in 1933 and 1934), national decathlon champion (1934), record holder for 14 years in decathlon, member of the national team; Football – player at B.M.T.E. Brașov, Astra Brașov and Telefon Club București (from the establishment of the club until it reached the second division); Handball in 11 – member of the national team and participant at the 1937 World Cup from Germany; Volleyball – player and captain of the national team; Shooting sports – the third place at the national rifle championships, with the performance of 391 points out of 400 possible; Alpine skiing – champion in the military patrol competition; Rowing – participant in the city championships of Bucharest as part of the Telefon Club București team; Water polo – goalkeeper at Telefon Club București in the city championship; Table tennis – trade union champion of the Capital in the mixed doubles event from 1946, together with Mariana Bunescu; Tennis – played in the second category championship and qualifiers of Bucharest for the C.C.A. and Justice team; Rugby – player at Telefon Club București; Fencing – university champion of Bucharest at foil and sabre in 1934; Gymnastics – member of the model team of ANEFS at the demonstrations from the student camp organized on the occasion of the 1936 Summer Olympics in Berlin.
- Kris Humphries – his first success in sports came in competitive swimming, where he was the top 10-year-old in the nation in six events, first, beating young Michael Phelps in the remaining events. Kris Humphries held the US national record for the 50-meter freestyle for 10 and under boys for 18 years. At age 12 he gave up swimming to pursue a career in basketball.
- Fats Jenkins – also had a twenty-year career as a left fielder in Negro league baseball.
- Michael Jordan – briefly played as an outfielder in the Southern League and Arizona Fall League after his first retirement from the NBA.
- Al Kellett – played two seasons as a relief pitcher for the Boston Red Sox and Philadelphia Athletics in 1923 and 1924.
- Trajan Langdon – played minor league baseball until 1997 after being drafted by the San Diego Padres in 1994.
- Greg Lee – also a pioneer in professional beach volleyball.
- John Lucas – also played on the Grand Prix tennis circuit and with World TeamTennis.
- Mickey McCarty – in 1968, he was selected by the Kansas City Chiefs in the fourth round of the NFL–AFL draft, by the Chicago Bulls in the 14th round of the NBA draft, by the Dallas Chaparrals in the ABA draft and by the Cleveland Indians in the 25th round of the MLB draft.
- Tracy McGrady – played in the Atlantic League of Professional Baseball after the conclusion of his NBA career.
- Darko Milicic – spent 9 seasons in the NBA before becoming a kickboxer.
- Cotton Nash – played in MLB for the Chicago White Sox and the Minnesota Twins in 1967–1969.
- Kevin Nash – professional wrestler and member of backstage group The Kliq, NWO also played professional basketball for the German Gießen 46ers.
- Tom Payne – played for the Atlanta Hawks in the 1971–72 NBA season. Put together a 3–2 record as a pro boxer in the 1980s.
- Erin Phillips – former WNBA player and Australian international who plays Australian rules football for Adelaide in the AFL Women's league. For the inaugural AFLW season in 2017, she was named the best and fairest player in both the season and Grand Final, as well as MVP by the league's players.
- Dick Ricketts – first pick of the 1955 NBA draft. Played for the St. Louis Hawks and Cincinnati Royals. Pitched in 1959 for the St. Louis Cardinals.
- Pat Riley – was an NFL draft pick.
- Nate Robinson – played football at the University of Washington. Robinson's college football career is most remembered for his interception in the final minutes of regulation of the 2002 Apple Cup against the Washington State Cougars, who were at the time ranked No. 3 in the AP poll.
- Dennis Rodman – has competed in professional wrestling, most notably the former WCW
- Cesare Rubini – inducted to the Basketball Hall of Fame in 1994 and in the International Swimming Hall of Fame for his merit in water polo.
- Rollie Seltz – played for the Anderson Duffey Packers of the NBA and several National Basketball League franchises after playing minor league professional baseball for Duluth Dukes, Jamestown Falcons, Rochester Red Wings, Lynchburg Cardinals and Allentown Cardinals.
- Bill Sharman – was in the Brooklyn Dodgers' farm system and was called up, but never played in the big leagues.
- J. R. Smith – currently playing golf collegiately at North Carolina A&T after the conclusion of his NBA career. In 2021, he signed with esports team Complexity Gaming and become three-sport athlete (basketball, golf (college), esports).
- Sophia Smith – plays soccer
- Matt Stainbrook – during his final year at Xavier University, competed on the track and field team as a discus thrower and shot putter, as well as basketball.
- Erick Strickland – played two seasons of Minor League Baseball while playing college basketball at Nebraska.
- Goose Tatum – played professional baseball in the Negro leagues.
- Mike Todorovich – played NBL pro basketball, played on the national champion football team at Notre Dame in 1943, was All-State in basketball and football, and also lettered in high school baseball and track.
- Jay Triano – former Toronto Raptors head coach, was drafted by the Los Angeles Lakers and the Canadian Football League's Calgary Stampeders.
- Ish Wainright – plays for Hapoel Tel Aviv in the Israeli Basketball Premier League and formerly for the Phoenix Suns in the NBA. Played as a tight end for Baylor Bears and was invited to the Buffalo Bills' 2018 rookie minicamp on an undrafted free agent deal.
- Charlie Ward – won the Heisman Trophy, drafted in Major League Baseball by the Milwaukee Brewers and New York Yankees, played tennis and started as a point guard in the NBA Finals

=== Bodybuilding ===
- Ronnie Coleman – played college football, and participated in powerlifting competitions.
- Stan Efferding — Powerlifting, bodybuilding
- Bev Francis — Powerlifting, bodybuilding
- Franco Columbu — Powerlifting, bodybuilding
- Lee Haney — Powerlifting, bodybuilding
- Johnnie O. Jackson — Powerlifting, bodybuilding
- Svend Karlsen — Powerlifting, bodybuilding, strongman
- Tommy Kono — Bodybuilding, Olympic weightlifting
- Markus Rühl — Powerlifting, bodybuilding
- Phil Heath — Powerlifting, bodybuilding
- Arnold Schwarzenegger — Powerlifting, bodybuilding
- Becca Swanson — Powerlifting, bodybuilding and wrestler

=== Bobsleigh ===
- Steve Holcomb – alpine skier before switching to bobsleigh.
- Jesse Lumsden – football (CFL) running back before switching to bobsleigh.
- Ashleigh Nelson – World and European championship medallist as a sprinter for Great Britain before joining Great Britain bobsleigh team, competing in Bobsleigh World Cup and the 2026 Winter Olympics which marked her Olympic debut.
- Joel Fearon – represented three nations internationally in bobsleigh (Great Britain, for whom he won an Olympic Games bronze medal), Switzerland by way of loan from Great Britain in the bobsleigh World Cup, and latterly the Jamaican bobsleigh team at the Olympic Games by descent from his father, while maintaining a track and field athletics career in Great Britain as a sub-10 second 100-metre sprinter and relay runner in the national squad.
- Adele Nicol – shot putter and discus thrower for Great Britain and Wales before joining Great Britain bobsleigh team. Maintained both sports simultaneously.
- Steve Mesler – competed in Track and Field at the University of Florida.
- Isabella Rositano – competed in Canoe Sprint before switching to bobsleigh and later boxing.
- Lyndon Rush – played football for the Saskatchewan Huskies before becoming an Olympic and World Championship medalist in bobsleigh.
- Curtis Tomasevicz – played football for the University of Nebraska Cornhuskers from 2000 to 2003.
- Alexey Voyevoda – world heavyweight 5 time world champion armwrestler before switching to bobsleigh. Olympic gold medals in two different bobsleigh categories in the same year.
- Lauryn Williams – competed in Womans Track

=== Bowling ===
- Don Carter – PBA Hall of Famer, appeared in 38 pro baseball games for the Red Springs Red Robins (a farm club of the Philadelphia Athletics), where Carter hit .302 in 96 AB and also pitched in 15 games, acquiring a 3–7 win–loss record.
- Eddie Lubanski – USBC Hall of Fame member, pitched for three seasons for farm clubs of the St. Louis Browns. He compiled an enviable 50–18 win–loss record, winning 20 games in his second season, but quit baseball entirely after a dispute with the owner of the Muskogee Reds. He returned to Detroit to become a full-time pro bowler, an occupation he had started at age fifteen.
- Walter Ray Williams Jr. – seven-time PBA Player of the Year, Williams has also won six Men's World Horseshoe Pitching titles.

=== Boxing ===
- Eddie Eagan – 1920 light heavyweight boxing Olympic gold-medalist, and 1932 Four-man bobsleigh Olympic gold-medalist. Only athlete to win gold at the Summer and Winter Games in different events.
- Eric Esch – retired boxer with an impressive 91–10–4 win–loss record who also fought professionally in kickboxing and mixed martial arts, creating a 7–4 and 28–10–1 win–loss record respectively.
- Roy Jones Jr. – played in one game for the Brevard Blue Ducks of the USBL basketball league in 1990.
- Bill Lang – Australian national heavyweight boxing champion. He was also an Australian rules footballer who played with Richmond in the Victorian Football League (VFL).
- Joe Louis – world heavyweight boxing champion from 1937 to 1949, also was a professional wrestler and was an amateur golfer. Louis was granted posthumous PGA membership.
- Ray Mercer – had two professional K-1 kickboxing bouts in 2004 and 2005, losing both. In 2009, Mercer had his first and only bout in pro MMA, defeating former UFC heavyweight champion Tim Sylvia.
- Anthony Mundine – Australian winner of multiple boxing titles, who was also the highest-paid Rugby league player in the NRL.
- Katie Taylor – amateur and professional world boxing champion, Olympic gold medalist (2012); also represented the Republic of Ireland women's national football team 11 times.
- Mihai Leu – WBO Welterweight Champion (1997). After retirement from boxing, he raced into Romanian Rally Championship which he won in 2003 (Group A).
- Seth Mitchell – heavyweight starred at linebacker for the Michigan State Spartans.
- Lucia Rijker – top ranked in both boxing and kickboxing.
- Manny Pacquiao – eight-division boxing champion drafted 11th overall by the Kia Motors team in the Philippine Basketball Association.
- Holly Holm – started as a kickboxer winning a national amateur kickboxing title. Went on to fight professionally as a kickboxer and boxer, becoming one of the most highly decorated female boxers and defending titles in three different weightclasses, going both up and down in weight. Due to being a dominant champion for a long time is still ranked as all-time best pound-for-pound by boxrec automated ranking. Started fighting in MMA while boxing and after retiring from boxing became the first athlete to be world champion in both boxing and MMA.
- Vitali Klitschko – had an extensive decade-long career in kickboxing, both amateur and professional, before becoming heavyweight boxing champion.
- Gary Mason – also played rugby league for London Crusaders.
- Jake Paul – amateur wrestler turned professional boxer.
- Logan Paul – celebrity boxer who has wrestled in amateur wrestling and in WWE.
- Kimbo Slice – boxer who also competed in street fighting and MMA.
- John L. Sullivan – played baseball professionally

=== Cricket ===
- Albert Alderman – also played football for Derby County and Burnley.
- Nathan Astle – also played football for Rangers A.F.C. and was good at auto racing.
- Diana Baig – played for both Pakistan national cricket team and Pakistan national football team.
- Chris Balderstone – England cricketer who also played football for Huddersfield Town, Carlisle United, Doncaster Rovers and Queen of the South.
- Suzie Bates – also represented New Zealand in basketball in the 2008 Summer Olympics.
- David Boon – also in racing
- Kaylum Boshier – is a professional rugby player in NZ, but he captained our U19 cricket team at the 2018 world cup.
- Ian Botham – player in the Football League while also being a Test cricketer.
- Liam Botham – played first-class cricket and then both rugby union and rugby league.
- Don Bradman – won the South Australian squash championship.
- Emma de Broughe – played cricket for South Australian Scorpions and field hockey for Adelaide Fire.
- Alex Carey – also played Australian rules football for Greater Western Sydney Giants.
- Yuzvendra Chahal – Indian cricketer and has also represented India internationally in chess at youth levels.
- Ian Chappell – played baseball for South Australia.
- Ric Charlesworth – also played Hockey
- Dipak Chudasama – played for Kenya in the 1996 Cricket World Cup and the 1982 Commonwealth Table Tennis Championships.
- Bertrand Clark – association football, cricket, golf, and tennis.
- Michael Clarke – also in rallying
- Denis Compton – played for England at both cricket and football (albeit the latter only in wartime matches which did not have full international status).
- Leslie Compton – played for England for cricket and played football for Arsenal F.C., brother of Denis.
- Kapil Dev – also played football
- Sophie Devine – played international hockey for the Black Sticks.
- Johnny Douglas – England cricket captain and Olympic champion boxer.
- Jess Duffin – played 117 matches for the Australia women's national cricket team, and played 42 AFL Women's matches.
- Andrew Flintoff – played for England in cricket from 1998 to 2009, made his pro boxing debut against Richard Dawson in 2012.
- C. B. Fry – played for England at cricket and football, and equalled the world record for the long jump.
- W. G. Grace – one of the greatest players in the history of cricket, who dominated the sport in the second half of the nineteenth century. Won the 440 yards hurdles at Crystal Palace in 1866, captained England at bowls
- M. J. Gopalan – Indian Test cricketer and also played for India national field hockey team.
- Syed Mohammad Hadi – Indian cricketer and tennis player.
- Richard Hadlee – also played football for Rangers A.F.C..
- Adam Hollioake – test cricketer and Captain of England ODI. Became Professional Boxer and Professional Mixed Martial Artist.
- Greame Hughes – also played rugby
- Andrew Johns – played rugby also played a couple of T20s for NSW when that was just starting up. Rugby league great.
- Chamika Karunaratne – played cricket for Sri Lanka national cricket team and Sri Lanka national badminton team.
- Michael Kasprowicz – played Australian Schoolboys rugby union, and considered a switch back to professional rugby during his career.
- Ray Lindwall – played 31 rugby league games for the St George Dragons.
- Adam Lyth – also played soccer for Manchester City
- Wayne Madsen – also played field hockey for South Africa in 2006 Hockey World Cup.
- Haley Matthews – participated in javelin
- Brendan McCullum – was an excellent rugby player at schoolboys level and was selected at fly half over Dan Carter for the South Island under 18 team.
- Nathan McCullum – played cricket for New Zealand and also played association football for Caversham.
- Keith Miller – played for Australia and also played Australian rules football for St. Kilda.
- Phil Neale – also played football for Lincoln City and Scunthorpe United.
- Simon O'Donnell – also played Australian rules football
- Ellyse Perry – has played for the senior Australian women's cricket and football (soccer) teams since the age of 16.
- Cotah Ramaswami – Indian Test cricketer and also represented in tennis.
- Jonty Rhodes – South African cricketer who was chosen as part of the national hockey team in the 1992 Olympic Games.
- Viv Richards – selected in Antigua's squad for the 1974 FIFA World Cup qualifying stage, but did not play in any of the matches.
- Rebecca Rolls – also played for the Football Ferns.
- Percy Sherwell – captained in every Test he played, and one of the few players to captain, keep wicket and open the batting in the same match. Won the South African Tennis Championships in 1904, and played rugby for Cornwall.
- Jimmy Sinclair – scored South Africa's first three Test centuries, and one of only two batsmen to score more than 50% of his team's runs across two all-out innings (Andy Flower being the other). Also played football and rugby at international level.
- Yuvraj Singh – won the National Under-14 Roller Skating Championship.
- Error Stewart – also played rugby
- Clare Taylor – played 121 matches for the England women's cricket team; also played the 1995 FIFA Women's World Cup for the England women's national football team.
- Naved Ul-Hassan – played U 16 hockey for Pakistan
- AB De Villiers – also played Tennis
- Sunette Viljoen – played for the Proteas women's team and won an Olympic silver medal and 2 Commonwealth Games gold medals in javelin after her Cricket career ended
- Rudie van Vuuren – represented Namibia in 2003 in both the Cricket and Rugby World Cups.
- Max Walker – played a bit in the VFL (Australian rules football) before moving to cricket full-time.
- Steve Waugh – also played football
- Jeff Wilson – played one-day international cricket and international rugby union for New Zealand, and has become commentator for both sports.

=== Cycling ===
- Lance Armstrong – began his athletic career at 16 when he became a professional triathlete and national sprint-course triathlon champion in 1989 and 1990. Also well known for winning the Tour de France race a record seven consecutive times before having his placings voided owing to multiple doping offenses.
- Antonella Bellutti – Italian Olympic champion in track cycling who also competed in bobsleigh at the Winter Olympics.
- Hamish Bond – New Zealand rower. Twice Olympic champion (2012 and 2016 Summer Olympics), and six times world champion (coxless pair). Bronze medalist in cycling (road time trial) at the 2018 Commonwealth Games, and champion of the same event at the 2018 Oceania Cycling Championships.
- Maria Canins – Italian racing cyclist, a biker and a cross-country skier. She twice won in the Tour de France Féminin. She rode for Italy at the 1984 and 1988 Summer Olympics. She won the gold medal in Team Time Trial in 1988 UCI Road World Championships. In cross-country skiing, Canins was Italian champion 15 times and the first Italian to win the Vasaloppet and win 10 times the Marcialonga. She was world champion in mountain biking in 1991 and 1993.
- Jaap Eden – the only man to win world titles in both cycling and speed skating in the late 19th century
- Eric Heiden – better known as a speed skater and quintuple gold medalist at the 1980 Winter Olympics, was also briefly a professional cyclist for the 7-Eleven (cycling team). He rode in the 1986 Tour de France.
- Chris Hoy – multiple Olympic, World and Commonwealth champion in track cycling who subsequently took up sports car racing
- Clara Hughes – won two bronze medals in road bicycle racing at the 1996 Summer Olympics. Hughes has also won several medals for speed skating in the Winter Olympics. Including: a bronze in 2002, a gold and a silver in 2006 and a bronze in 2010.
- Taylor Knibb – is a triathlete
- Tanasije Kuvalja – 1968 Summer Olympian for Yugoslavia who later became a Touring car racing driver, winning the Serbia Touring Car Championship twice.
- Greg LeMond – raced Formula Ford 2000 after his retirement from cycling.
- Christa Luding-Rothenburger – excelled in both cycling and speed skating
- Jaqueline Mourão – competed at summer and winter Olympic games in three different sports: MTB, cross country ski and biathlon
- Emma Pooley – winner of the 2009 Grande Boucle Féminine Internationale, 2010 Road World Time Trial Champion and silver medalist in the 2008 Olympic road time trial who has also enjoyed success in long-distance road running (winning the 2013 Lausanne Marathon), triathlon (winning the 2015 Embrunman and Alpe d'Huez long-distance triathlons) and duathlon (winning the Powerman Duathlon world championship in 2014 and 2015).
- Primož Roglič – Slovenian road cyclist who competed in Continental Cup ski jumping until 2011.
- Rebecca Romero – won a silver medal in rowing in the quadruple scull event at the 2004 Summer Olympics before switching to cycling, winning gold in the individual pursuit in the 2008 Summer Olympics. After the individual pursuit was removed from the Olympics in 2012, she entered the Ironman UK triathlon and qualified for the Ironman World Championship as an age-grouper.
- Alison Shanks – world record holder for individual pursuit in Olympics who was a netball player for Otago Rebels.
- Nicolas Vouilloz – ten-time Downhill Mountain Bike World Championships winner, but also competed at the World Rally Championship and Intercontinental Rally Challenge, resulting champion in the latter.
- Michael Woods – formerly a successful middle-distance runner at junior level, becoming Canadian national junior record holder for the mile and 3000 metres and the 1500 metre champion at the 2005 Pan American Junior Athletics Championships before becoming a professional cyclist
- Cameron Wurf – competed in rowing at the 2004 Summer Olympics before becoming a professional cyclist, and then a professional triathlete.

=== Darts ===
- Leonard Gates – played minor league baseball for Abilene Prairie Dogs, Massachusetts Mad Dogs, Catskill Cougars and Nashua Pride.
- Florian Hempel – played handball as a goalkeeper for Dessau-Roßlauer HV.
- Gerwyn Price – played rugby union for Cross Keys, Neath, Glasgow Warriors and, at the 2005 Under 21 Rugby World Championship, the Welsh under-21 team, as well as rugby league for South Wales Ironmen, before switching to darts, becoming world champion in 2021.
- Haupai Puha – played golf for the Wellington men's team and twice won the New Zealand Māori Golf Match Play championship.

=== Figure skating ===
- Max Aaron – US figure skater who started his skating career as a figure skater, he also represented USA in USA Hockey nationals in both 2006 and 2007, and played U18 AA as well as competing in figure skating at amateur level during that time.
- Elvis Stojko – Canadian figure skater in the 1990s, also competed in martial arts and motocross racing.

=== Golf ===
- Bertrand Milbourne Clark – association football, cricket, golf, and tennis.
- Hale Irwin – All-Big Eight Conference safety in football at the University of Colorado before opting for golf full-time.
- Ralph McKittrick – played both golf and tennis in 1904 Summer Olympics.
- Masashi Ozaki – played professional baseball in Japan before playing golf.
- Frank Souchak – played football for the Pittsburgh Pirates (Steelers) in 1939.
- Babe Zaharias – won three Olympic medals (two gold and one silver) in track & field and was also an All-American basketball player before becoming a founding member of the LPGA.

=== Gridiron football ===
==== American football ====
- Boston Scott – becomes the first professional two-sport athlete in American football and eSports. He signed with Rocket League team Dignitas.
- Mo Alie-Cox – played college basketball at VCU, a school that has no football team, before becoming an NFL tight end.
- Clive Allen – also played soccer
- Morten Andersen – played on Denmark's junior national soccer team.
- Brandon Aubrey – played as a defender for Toronto FC and Bethlehem Steel FC.
- Red Badgro – played Major League Baseball for the St. Louis Browns in 1929 and 1930.
- Chris Bahr – played soccer for the Philadelphia Atoms of the North American Soccer League and was Rookie of the Year in 1974.
- Matt Bahr – played soccer for the Colorado Caribous and Tulsa Roughnecks of the North American Soccer League.
- Terry Baker – at Oregon State, won the 1962 Heisman Trophy and was also a member of a basketball team that reached the 1963 NCAA Men's Division I Basketball Tournament.
- Richard Bartel – also pitched eight games for the Cincinnati Reds minor league team.
- Steve Bartkowski – drafted by the Kansas City Royals in the 1971 Major League Baseball draft. Played college baseball at California.
- Michael Bates – competed in the 200 metres at the 1992 Summer Olympics.
- Sammy Baugh – played football and baseball at TCU, and went on to play in the minor leagues for the St. Louis Cardinals, then going to the NFL.
- Le'Veon Bell – also competes in boxing.
- Darren Bennett – punter in the NFL for the San Diego Chargers and Minnesota Vikings after nearly a decade in the Australian Football League.
- Michael Bennett – ran track at the University of Wisconsin.
- Cedric Benson – drafted by the Los Angeles Dodgers in the 12th round of the 2001 MLB Draft; totaled 25 at-bats with their summer team.
- Jay Berwanger – former Heisman Trophy winner, decathlete who set the school record at Michigan.
- Michael Bishop – played quarterback for the New England Patriots and was drafted by the Cleveland Indians in the 28th round of the 1995 Major League Baseball draft. Played baseball at Independence Community College.
- Jeremy Bloom – competed in Freestyle skiing at the 2002 and 2006 Winter Olympics.
- Josh Booty – played in the Florida Marlins minor league system and played 13 games at the Major League level for the team from 1996 to 1998, including an opening day start at third base.
- Todd Bouman – played football and basketball at St. Cloud State.
- Terry Bradshaw – set a national record by throwing the javelin 244 feet, 11 3/4 inches.
- Tom Brady – was drafted as a catcher by the Montreal Expos.
- John Brodie – played on golf's Senior PGA Tour, winning once in 1991.
- Jim Brown – All-American in lacrosse, played basketball, baseball, and ran track at Syracuse University. In the Pro Football Hall of Fame, Lacrosse Hall of Fame, and College Football Hall of Fame.
- Ron Brown – track athlete, won gold medal in the 4×100 relay at the 1984 Los Angeles Olympics.
- Sheldon Brown – former cornerback for the Cleveland Browns and Philadelphia Eagles, played football and baseball at South Carolina.
- Tom Brown – played with the Washington Senators in 1963 and with the Green Bay Packers in the 1st two Super Bowls.
- Terrell Buckley – played two seasons of professional baseball after being selected in the 1992 Major League Baseball draft.
- Isaac Byrd – drafted in the 11th round of the 1996 MLB draft by the St. Louis Cardinals.
- Cris Carter – played basketball and football at Ohio State University.
- Michael Carter – went to the 1984 Los Angeles Olympics, winning a silver medal in shot put. Won Olympic medal and Super Bowl ring for the same year.
- Rodney Carter – played college baseball at Purdue.
- Quincy Carter – played Minor League Baseball in the Chicago Cubs' farm system from 1996 to 1999.
- Matt Cassel – played college baseball at USC in 2004.
- Robert Chancey – played four seasons of minor league baseball after being selected in the 1992 Major League Baseball draft
- Peter Christofilakos – played semi-professional indoor soccer
- Lynn Compton – starting guard at the 1943 Rose Bowl game was also an all-conference catcher, an All-American baseball player, and a teammate of Jackie Robinson.
- Chuck Connors – NBA and MLB player.
- Quan Cosby – played in the Anaheim Angels farm system before playing college and pro football.
- Ronald Curry – won the 1998 McDonald's All-American Slam Dunk contest and was the MVP for the 1998 McDonald's All-American basketball game. Was ranked by the Recruiting Services Consensus Index as the No. 6 best high school senior in basketball for 1998. Played basketball for the University of North Carolina.
- Eric Decker – former wide receiver in the NFL, was drafted twice (by the Milwaukee Brewers and Minnesota Twins). Played college baseball at Minnesota.
- Jack Del Rio – drafted by the Toronto Blue Jays out of high school and played baseball and football at USC.
- Adam DiMichele – played quarterback for the Philadelphia Eagles and was drafted by the Toronto Blue Jays in the 38th round of the 2005 MLB draft. Played baseball at Northwest Florida State College.
- Bobby Douglass – Chicago Bears quarterback also pitched in the Chicago White Sox minor league system for a very short period.
- D.J. Dozier – played five seasons with the NFL's Minnesota Vikings and Detroit Lions from 1987 to 1991, and played one season with MLB's New York Mets in 1992
- Dennis Dixon – NFL quarterback; was drafted by the Atlanta Braves and played 2 rookie league games.
- Kenny Easley – drafted in the 10th round of the 1981 NBA draft.
- Nate Ebner – played rugby sevens for the USA at the 2016 Olympics.
- "Sugar" Ray Edwards – played for the Minnesota Vikings and Atlanta Falcons, also professional boxer
- John Elway – selected by the New York Yankees in the second round of the 1981 Major League Baseball draft. Yankees owner George Steinbrenner planned to use Elway as the team's starting right fielder by the 1985 season if he had given up football.
- Darren Fells – played college basketball at UC Irvine and professional basketball overseas from 2008 to 2012 before switching to American football.
- Richmond Flowers Jr. – track and field; NCAA Indoor Champion and later professional hurdler.
- Toni Fritsch – NFL kicker played 8 years for Rapid Vienna and won 3 championships in the Austria League. He also scored 2 goals in 1965 to help Austria beat England 3–2 at Wembley.
- Justin Gage – played basketball for the University of Missouri.
- Antonio Gates – all-conference player in college basketball at Eastern Michigan and Kent State.
- Rico Gathers – never played football after middle school, and instead played college basketball for Baylor. He was drafted in 2016 as a tight end by the Dallas Cowboys.
- Willie Gault – qualified for the U.S. Olympic track team, but did not compete because of the 1980 Summer Olympics boycott. He also made the 1988 Winter Olympics bobsledding team as an alternate.
- Toby Gerhart – played baseball at Stanford and was offered a contract after the 2010 MLB draft but declined it to play football.
- Chas Gessner – Div. I All-American in football and lacrosse at Brown University and played in the NFL and was drafted by Major League Lacrosse.
- Turner Gill – also played minor league baseball for several teams.
- Bill Goldberg – played for the Sacramento Gold Miners and Atlanta Falcons as well as wrestling in the World Championship Wrestling and WWE promotions.
- Tony Gonzalez – played college basketball for UC Berkeley, which reached the NCAA Men's Division I Basketball Tournament in 1997
- Herbert Goodman – played 12 games at running back in the NFL for the Green Bay Packers. Also has an 18–10 record as a pro mixed martial artist, having fought the likes of Hector Lombard.
- Marquise Goodwin – NFL receiver and kickoff returner was an Olympic long jumper and two-time NCAA champion in the sport. He was a four-time All-American in track and field.
- Otto Graham – played in the National Basketball League (NBL) for the Rochester Royals from 1945 to 1946. One of only two athletes (Gene Conley) to win a championship in two different major sports: Rochester Royals (NBL) 1946 championship and Cleveland Browns (AAFC) 1946 championship.
- Jimmy Graham – pro football tight end, played 4 years of basketball for the Miami Hurricanes.
- Bud Grant – lettered in baseball and basketball at the University of Minnesota, and later played two seasons in the NBA, two seasons in the NFL, and four seasons in the CFL.
- Darrell Green – competed as a professional sprinter from 1981 to 1982.
- Kevin Greene – American football Played in the National Football League and was also a professional wrestler.
- Jabari Greer – played football and track and field at Tennessee.
- Robert Griffin III – record-setting college hurdler.
- George Halas – replaced by Babe Ruth after being given a brief trial as the New York Yankees' right fielder.
- Andre Hardy Jr. – played college basketball at Oral Roberts and Cal State Fullerton, then signed with the Oakland Raiders as an undrafted free agent tight end in 2012
- Greg Hardy – MMA fighter.
- Demetrius Harris – played college basketball at the University of Wisconsin–Milwaukee.
- Carlton Haselrig – All Pro offensive lineman for the Pittsburgh Steelers and NCAA heavyweight wrestling champion three consecutive years for the University of Pittsburgh at Johnstown.
- Bob Hayes – world-class sprinter who won two gold medals at the 1964 Tokyo Olympics.
- Drew Henson – also appeared in Major League Baseball with the New York Yankees
- Chris Hogan – signed by the Cannons Lacrosse Club to play in the Premier Lacrosse League.
- Danan Hughes – played two seasons of minor league baseball after being selected in the 1992 Major League Baseball draft.
- Chad Hutchinson – quarterback for the Dallas Cowboys and pitcher for the St. Louis Cardinals.
- Bo Jackson – player for the Kansas City Royals and for the Los Angeles Raiders.
- Vic Janowicz – 1950 Heisman Trophy winner and Washington Redskins halfback was also a catcher with the Pittsburgh Pirates in 1953 and 1954.
- James Jett – won gold in 4×100 meters relay at 1992 Olympics.
- Corey Jenkins – played minor league baseball and was former first-round pick for the Boston Red Sox, played college football for the South Carolina Gamecocks and then linebacker for the Miami Dolphins.
- Andre Johnson – on the track and field team at the University of Miami.
- Jerrod Johnson – former quarterback for Texas A&M, also played basketball for one season.
- Brandon Jones – played college baseball at Oklahoma.
- Ed "Too Tall" Jones – briefly retired from football to become a boxer, with a 6–0 record as a heavyweight, before returning to the Dallas Cowboys.
- Maurice Jones-Drew – former running back for the Jacksonville Jaguars, played football and ran track at UCLA.
- Brian Jordan – played defensive back for the Atlanta Falcons, played football and outfield for the Atlanta Braves and the St. Louis Cardinals.
- Danny Kanell – played college baseball at Florida State and professionally for the Newark Bears.
- Arthur Karpus – played college football, basketball and baseball, later went on to play minor league baseball.
- Roy Kidd – named a "Little All-American" quarterback and all Ohio Valley Conference baseball player at Eastern Kentucky University.
- Ernie Ladd – in the professional wrestling promotion now known as WWE from 1961 to 1986.
- Josh Lambo – also played in MLS
- Paul Lasike – played for Utah Warriors during the inaugural 2018 Major League Rugby season and later for Harlequin F.C. in the Premiership Rugby.
- Bobby Layne – NFL Hall of Famer, also a four-time All-conference selection in baseball.
- Joe Lillard – American football, baseball, and basketball player.
- Jake Locker – former quarterback for the Tennessee Titans, played outfield for the Bellingham Bells of the West Coast Collegiate Baseball League, and was drafted by the Los Angeles Angels of Anaheim in the 10th round of the 2009 MLB Draft.
- Dave Logan – drafted by the NFL (the Cleveland Browns), the National Basketball Association (by the Sacramento Kings), and Major League Baseball (the Cincinnati Reds).
- John Lynch – threw the first pitch in the history of the Erie Sailors minor league baseball team and played in the Florida Marlins minor league system.
- Brandon Magee – played minor league baseball for Boston Red Sox, drafted by Tampa Bay Rays, Oakland A's and Boston Red Sox.
- Bradley Marquez – drafted by the New York Mets in 2011 and played two minor league seasons before turning his attention to football. Returned to the Mets organization in 2019 after four NFL seasons.
- Ollie Matson – won two medals in the 1952 Helsinki Olympics.
- Banks McFadden – while at Clemson, he was a 2-time all-American in basketball and named the 1939 Associated Press Athlete of the year.
- Pat McAfee – also played soccer at West Virginia University.
- Wahoo McDaniel – University of Oklahoma, AFL 1960s, pro wrestler.
- Donovan McNabb – played basketball for Syracuse University.
- Tony Meola – also played baseball, soccer and basketball
- Evan Moore – tight end; played two years of college basketball at Stanford.
- Matt Moore – drafted in the 22nd round of the 2004 MLB draft by the Los Angeles Angels and also played in a Southern California semi-pro baseball league.
- Johnnie Morton – following his NFL career, he had a brief MMA career before being banned for testing positive for steroids, lost his only fight by a first-round knockout.
- Kyler Murray – played for the Oklahoma Sooners baseball team, and was drafted by the Oakland Athletics in the first round of the 2018 MLB draft but declined the MLB contract. He is also one of several athletes signed to the esports team FaZe Clan.
- Bronko Nagurski – competed in the National Wrestling Association from 1944 to 1960
- Stephen Neal – Olympic wrestler in 2000
- Christian Okoye – excelled in track and field at college, winning seven college titles in the shot put, discus, and hammer throw.
- Lawrence Okoye – also competed in Discus throw at the 2012 and 2020 Olympics.
- Terrell Owens – ran track at the University of Tennessee at Chattanooga. Also played basketball in college, in the Sacramento Kings summer league, and the USBL's Adirondack Wildcats.
- Jarrad Page – played college baseball at UCLA and professionally in 2012.
- Clarence "Ace" Parker – NFL Hall of Famer, played two MLB seasons with the Philadelphia Athletics and hit a home run in his first major league at-bat.
- Walter Payton – raced in Trans-Am for Tom Gloy.
- Julius Peppers – while at the University of North Carolina, Peppers was also a walk-on member of the men's basketball team.
- Tom Pestock – former offensive lineman for the Indianapolis Colts and Arizona Cardinals as well as a three-time Golden Gloves winner. He currently wrestles in the WWE as Baron Corbin.
- Jake Plummer – former NFL quarterback who competed in American handball in Alaska.
- Charlie Powell – had a boxing career in 1962, played for the St. Louis Browns in the MLB, and was offered a tryout by the Harlem Globetrotters, but declined it.
- Antwaan Randle El – played college baseball and basketball at Indiana University.
- Ed Reed – a member of the Miami track team and at one point the Big East javelin champion.
- Sammis Reyes – Chilean basketball player who played for their national team. Also the first Chilean to play in the NFL.
- Denard Robinson – also ran track at the University of Michigan.
- Saverio Rocca – played Australian rules football for Collingwood.
- Tony Romo – also plays golf
- Stanford Routt – ran track at the University of Houston.
- Deion Sanders – ran track in college and spent nine years in Major League Baseball; the only person to play in both a Super Bowl and a World Series.
- Tony Scheffler – played football and baseball at Western Michigan University.
- Jay Schroeder – played baseball in the Toronto Blue Jays' farm system 1980–83.
- Wes Shivers – played three games in the NFL for the Atlanta Falcons. Also has an 8–1 record as a pro mixed martial artist.
- Austin Simmons – quarterback who also played as a baseball pitcher in college
- Akili Smith – drafted third overall in the 1999 NFL draft by the Bengals and played two seasons of minor league baseball.
- Robert Smith – track sprinter at Ohio State.
- Tommie Smith – competed in the 200 metres. Also known for the 1968 Olympics Black Power salute.
- Jan Stenerud – came to Montana State University from Norway on a ski jumping scholarship and was an All-America selection in football and ski jumping. Played soccer in Norway.
- Pete Stoyanovich – former kicker for the Miami Dolphins, Kansas City Chiefs, and St. Louis Rams. Played soccer for three seasons at Indiana University.
- Ryan Succop – also plays golf
- Golden Tate – pro football wide receiver, college baseball player at Notre Dame.
- Tim Tebow – 2007 Heisman Trophy winner and former NFL quarterback and former outfielder for the New York Mets minor league baseball organization.
- Shaq Thompson – former Gulf Coast League player for the Boston Red Sox.
- B. J. Tucker – ran track at the University of Wisconsin.
- Cody Thomas – former University of Oklahoma quarterback, drafted by the New York Yankees (2013) and Los Angeles Dodgers (2016).
- Joe Thomas – shot putter and discus thrower at Wisconsin.
- Mark Vital – played on the practice squads of NFL teams the Seattle Seahawks and the Kansas City Chiefs. Also played the Portland Trail Blazers in the NBA Summer League.
- Herschel Walker – participated in the 1992 Winter Olympics as a bobsled pusher, ran track at the University of Georgia and later a mixed martial arts competitor.
- Javon Walker – former wide receiver NFL was drafted in the 1997 MLB draft by the Florida Marlins and played three years in the minors.
- Brandon Weeden – quarterback for the Dallas Cowboys, played minor league baseball for the New York Yankees and the Los Angeles Dodgers.
- Chris Weinke – played six years of minor league baseball before going to Florida State, where he won the Heisman Trophy and led his team to the BCS National Championship Game. Later started in the NFL.
- Michael Westbrook – competed in MMA.
- Griff Whalen – formerly with the Indianapolis Colts, also played lacrosse at Stanford.
- Pat White – was selected in the MLB draft four times and signed with the Kansas City Royals after being cut by the Miami Dolphins in 2010.
- Ron Widby – played pro basketball with the New Orleans Buccaneers of the American Basketball Association and was a punter in the National Football League from 1967 to 1973 part of the Super Bowl VI champion Dallas Cowboys.
- Ricky Williams – played as a running back, 12 seasons in the National Football League, one season in the Canadian Football League (CFL), and four years of minor league baseball for the Philadelphia Phillies.
- Russell Wilson – a baseball infielder at North Carolina State, Wilson was drafted by the Colorado Rockies Major League Baseball team in the 2010 draft with the 140th pick, and was also drafted by the Texas Rangers in the 2013 Rule 5 draft.
- Jameis Winston – pro football quarterback; was a two-sport athlete for Florida State as a quarterback, winning the Heisman Trophy in 2013, and as an outfielder in baseball. He decided to go to college despite being drafted by the Texas Rangers in the 15th round of the 2012 Major League Baseball draft.
- Rod Woodson – pro football Hall-of-Fame defensive back, and a former world-class 110 meter hurdler.
- Tom Zbikowski – former safety and professional boxer.

==== Canadian football ====
- Condredge Holloway – Canadian Football Hall of Famer who played college baseball at Tennessee where he was an All-American.
- Jesse Lumsden – played in the Canadian Football League between 2004 and 2010 for the Hamilton Tiger-Cats, Edmonton Eskimos, and Calgary Stampeders. Was a CFL East All-star in 2007. After retiring from football he became a bobsledder and made the 2010 Canadian Olympic team in both the two-man and four-man bobsled teams. In 2013 was part of the two-man World Cup two-man winning bobsled team.
- Gabe Patterson – played for the Saskatchewan Roughriders in 1947 and 1948, and also played Negro league baseball for the New York Black Yankees (1941 and 1947) and Philadelphia Stars (1947 and 1948).
- Red Storey – played six seasons and won the Grey Cup twice with the Toronto Argonauts, but also was an all-star in the Ontario Lacrosse Association and played with the Montreal Royals minor hockey team. Finally, he was a referee in the Canadian Football League (12 years) and in the National Hockey League (9 years).
- Luc Tousignant – all-star college football player, he was the first French Canadian starting QB with the Montreal Concordes, having previously represented Canada in handball at the 1976 Summer Olympic games in Montreal.
- Paul Clatney – Canadian Football League 86–94 won 3 Grey Cups. Gold at 83 Canadian Winter Games in Wrestling. Canadian Bobsled Team 88–90. Bronze in 2 man at 89 World Cup. In-line hockey 93 Calgary Rad'z Ice Hockey 95–96 Madison Monsters.

=== Gymnastics ===
- Alex Croak — won Commonwealth Games gold medals and competed at the Olympic Games in both artistic gymnastics and diving.
- Carl Schuhmann – also boxes and has a gold medal at the Olympics.
- Laís Souza – competed at the 2004 and 2008 Summer Olympics in artistic gymnastics and qualified for the 2014 Winter Olympics in freestyle skiing, but was forced to withdraw after a skiing accident left her paralyzed.

=== Handball ===
- Laura Coenen – played basketball at the University of Minnesota, notably being named in 1983 as the inaugural Big Ten Conference Women's Basketball Player of the Year, before switching to handball and representing the USA in three Olympics.
- Roswitha Krause – is also a swimmer

=== Ice hockey ===
- Vsevolod Bobrov – one of greatest Russian players of all time, won gold with the Soviet national team at the 1956 Olympics. Played soccer for the USSR at the 1952 Olympics.
- Petr Čech – Soccer Goalkeeper of the Year 2005.
- Donald Brashear – has a 1–0 record in mixed martial arts, and a 2–1 record as an amateur boxer, while training with Joe Frazier.
- Jack Caffery – center for the Boston Bruins and Toronto Maple Leafs pitched in the Milwaukee Braves and Houston Colt .45s organizations during and after his pro hockey career.
- Jeremy Cheyne – played professional ice hockey for the Victoria Salmon Kings (ECHL) and Bayreuth Tigers (Germany), and lacrosse for the Calgary Roughnecks (NLL) and Victoria Shamrocks (WLA).
- Lionel Conacher – Canada's greatest male athlete in the 1920s, and 1930s, he also excelled in Canadian football, lacrosse, baseball, boxing and wrestling. He, along with Carl Voss is one of only two people to have their names on both the Stanley Cup and Grey Cup.
- Bill Ezinicki – played professional golf after hockey, winning several tournaments.
- Chris Drury – won the Little League World Series.
- Jarome Iginla – played baseball for the Canadian national junior team.
- Gerry James – played with the Toronto Maple Leafs from 1954–55 to 1959–60, and played football for the Winnipeg Blue Bombers and Saskatchewan Roughriders between 1952 and 1964.
- Hank Lammens – played with the Ottawa Senators in 1993–94, and the captain of the Canadian National Team, and an internationally accomplished sailor, competing for Canada in the 1992 Summer Olympics. He is a two-time world champion in the Finn class.
- Rod Langway – played both college football and hockey for the University of New Hampshire before pursuing his professional hockey career.
- Jon Mirasty – nicknamed "Nasty" by teammates and fans, competed professionally as an MMA fighter. Was provincial and Golden Gloves champion in 1998 and 1999 in Canadian youth boxing.
- Matt Moulson – drafted in the fourth round of 2003 National Lacrosse League Entry Draft by the Rochester Knighthawks.
- Joe Nieuwendyk – played lacrosse for the Whitby Warriors, winning the Minto Cup.
- Patrice Brisebois – competed in the Ferrari Challenge and NASCAR Canadian Tire Series.
- Jim Riley – only person to have ever played in both the National Hockey League and Major League Baseball. Played for the Chicago Black Hawks and Detroit Cougars, winning the Stanley Cup in 1917 with the Seattle Metropolitans. Played professional baseball for 12 seasons, briefly making it to the majors with the St. Louis Browns and Washington Senators.
- Gary Roberts – played lacrosse for the Whitby Warriors, winning the Minto Cup.
- Teemu Selänne – professionally raced rally cars in his native Finland under the alias "Teukka Salama".
- Dave Semenko – participated in an exhibition boxing match against Muhammad Ali in 1983.
- Sven Tumba – played one game for the Sweden men's national football team and played for Sweden in golf's Eisenhower Trophy.
- Carl Voss – Hockey Hall of Fame inductee won the Calder Memorial Trophy and Stanley Cup while in the NHL, also played Canadian football for the Queen's Golden Gaels, winning the Grey Cup. He, along with Lionel Conacher is one of only two people to have their names on both the Stanley Cup and Grey Cup.
- Hayley Wickenheiser – played for Canada's women's softball team at the 2000 Summer Olympics
- Jeremy Yablonski – professional hockey player in Europe and North America, he has fought professionally in MMA XFS (Extreme Fight Series). He was also a one-time, novice Golden Gloves boxing champion.
- Peter Zezel – played for numerous teams in the National Hockey League as well as competitive soccer for the Toronto Blizzard and North York Rockets.
- Jaroslav Drobný – Silver medalist with the Czechoslovak ice hockey team in 1948, also an inductee in the International Tennis Hall of Fame.
- Christina Julien – 019/2020 & 2022/2023 Champion with Melbourne Ice Women in the Australian Women's Ice Hockey League. Bronze at 2012 Summer Olympics in football.

=== Jai Alai ===
- Kenny Kelly – also played in MLB
- Tanard Davis – NFL player

=== Lacrosse ===
- Jenny Williams – World Cup winning (1986) and team captain (1989–92) lacrosse player for Australia who represented South Australia in six sports (lacrosse, indoor lacrosse, touch football, soccer, cricket and Australian football).
- Julia Dorsey – plays soccer

=== Mixed martial arts ===
- Ben Askren – also competed in collegiate and freestyle wrestling.
- Dave Bautista – was a WWE wrestler before becoming an MMA fighter, returned to the WWE in 2014 and 2019.
- Henry Cejudo – competed in freestyle wrestling at the 2008 Summer Olympics and is the first Olympic gold medalist in UFC.
- Aaron Chalmers – competes in both MMA and boxing events.
- Cris Cyborg – also competes in boxing, kickboxing, and submission grappling.
- Nate Diaz – also competes in boxing.
- Nick Diaz – turned pro in MMA in 2001, then made his pro boxing debut in 2005.
- Fedor Emelianenko – four-time world heavyweight champion in combat sambo while being No. 1 ranked heavyweight in MMA from 2003 till 2010. Also medaled in judo at national level.
- Kayla Harrison – two-sport world champion in MMA and judo.
- Alex Pereira – two-sport world champion in MMA and kickboxing.
- Dan Severn – UFC Hall of Famer, former All-American collegiate wrestler and former professional wrestler.
- Keith Jardine – turned pro in MMA in 2001, then made his pro boxing debut in 2003.
- Bobby Lashley – performs at TNA Wrestling as well as fighting at Bellator MMA.
- Brock Lesnar – was Pro Wrestling Illustrated's Wrestler of the Year in 2002, and an NCAA Division I Heavyweight Wrestling Champion. Also made the preseason roster for the Minnesota Vikings in 2004.
- Stipe Miocic – wrestled and played baseball at Cleveland State University before moving to MMA, eventually becoming UFC Heavyweight Champion.
- Matt Mitrione – played nine games at defensive tackle for the New York Giants in the 2002 NFL season.
- Francis Ngannou – MMA fighter and professional boxer.
- Khabib Nurmagomedov – two-sport world champion in MMA and Sambo.
- Alistair Overeem – won the K-1 2010 World Grand Prix kickboxing championship.
- Ronda Rousey – former swimmer, 2008 Bronze Medalist in Judo for USA before becoming the first female UFC champion. Is a retired WWE wrestler.
- Bob Sapp – played one game at Guard for the Minnesota Vikings in the 1997 NFL season.
- Semmy Schilt – four-time winner of the K-1 World Grand Prix kickboxing championship (2005, 2006, 2007, 2009).
- Ken Shamrock – UFC Hall of Famer, shootfighter and professional wrestler.
- Anderson Silva – turned pro in MMA in 1997, then made his pro boxing debut in 1998.
- Mark Hunt – winner of the K-1 World Grand Prix kickboxing championship (2001). 1999 WKBF Australian Super Heavyweight Champion.
- Tank Abbott – MMA fighter that competed in UFC and Pride Fighting Championships, signed and performed in World Championship Wrestling from 1999 to 2000.
- Oleg Prudius – Ukrainian-American Sambo and Heavyweight Grappling champion and former professional wrestler.
- Valentina Shevchenko – three-sport world champion in MMA, kickboxing, and Muay Thai.
- Andrew Tate – also competes in kickboxing and boxing
- Tyron Woodley – also completes in boxing

=== Motorsport ===
- Nasser Al-Attiyah – won the Dakar Rally, World Rally-Raid Championship and Production World Rally Championship, and also earned medals in shooting at the Olympic Games and Asian Games.
- Jenson Button – former Formula 1 driver and triathlete.
- Brian Deegan – won professional events in freestyle motocross, rallycross and off-road truck racing.
- Austin Dillon – full-time NASCAR Cup Series driver, 2011 Truck Series Champion and 2013 Nationwide Champion who played for Southwest Forsyth (Southeast) in the 2002 Little League World Series.
- Brendan Gaughan – played basketball and football at Georgetown University.
- Jimmie Johnson – 7-time NASCAR Champion and former water polo player, diver and swimmer at college. He also trains in triathlon and marathons.
- Travis Pastrana – won professional events in supercross, motocross, freestyle motocross, and rally racing. He raced full-time in the NASCAR Nationwide Series in 2013 with Roush Fenway Racing.
- Valentino Rossi – 7 times MotoGP world champion currently competing in Sports car racing after his retirement from MotoGP.
- Jackie Stewart – 1969, 1971, and 1973 F1 champion and international smoothbore shooter.
- Brandon Semenuk – professional rally car racer; he is also a legend in Freeride (mountain biking), having won a X-Games MTB Gold Medalist (2021), and X-Games Silver medalist (2013) in the Mountain Bike Slopestyle event.
- John Surtees – only man to be a Formula 1 and MotoGP World Champion.
- Paul Tracy – professional automobile racer who has competed in CART, the Champ Car World Series and the IndyCar Series. He won the Champ Car World Series in 2003. Paul also raced downhill mountain bikes professionally for Yeti Cycles in 1994.
- Alex Zanardi – ex-F1 driver, double CART champion, and race winner in the World Touring Car Championship – subsequently a double gold medalist at both the 2012 and 2016 Paralympics in handcycling; also winner of class at 2011 New York City Marathon.
- Joe Graf Jr – NASCAR driver, played Lacrosse in High School at Don Bosco Preparatory High School.
- Laia Sanz – Women's World Trial Champion and Women's Enduro World Champion, has also won the Dakar Rally in the Female Class and finished 9th in the overall classification.
- Nani Roma – Rally Dakar winner with car and motorcycle.

=== Netball ===
- Ashleigh Brazill – concurrently plays in the Suncorp Super Netball and AFLW for Collingwood Football Club.
- Anna Harrison – former Silver Fern who competed in Beach Volleyball.
- Nia Jones – Welsh Netballer who also plays for the Wales women's national football team.
- Louisa Wall – former Silver Fern who also represented the Black Ferns.
- Donna Wilkins (née Loffhagen) – former Silver Fern who also represented the Tall Ferns.

=== Orienteering ===
- Tove Alexandersson – 21 times world champion in Orienteering (end of 2024). She also has ten world championships in Ski orienteering. In 2018 Alexandersson won the world championships in Sky running after her second skyrunning race ever. In 2020 she took up racing in Ski mountaineering after having trained that for some time (pausing ski orienteering but racing orienteering during the summer). In 2021 she won the combined class of the world championship, and in 2025 the Individual class in Ski mountaineering. This made her having world championships gold in four sports.

=== Rowing ===
- Daniela Druncea — was an elite gymnast and won a bronze medal with the Romanian team at the 2007 World Artistic Gymnastics Championships before taking up rowing.
- Rebecca Romero — also is in cycling

=== Rugby league ===
- Monty Betham – son of Monty Betham Sr. former professional rugby league footballer who switched to professional boxing post retirement and later as a boxing trainer, he also came second in Dancing With the Stars in 2008.
- Sam Burgess – forward for the South Sydney Rabbitohs and England, and has also played for the Bradford Bulls, NRL All Stars, and Great Britain. Represented England at the 2015 Rugby World Cup and played cub rugby for Bath.
- Darren Clark – has had a career as a runner running 4th at both the 1984 and 1988 Olympics and finished his career with the Balmain Tigers.
- Abi Ekoku – also represented his country at athletics.
- Craig Gower – former hooker/halfback for the Penrith Panthers, London Broncos, and Newcastle Knights who also represented New South Wales and Australia. Played rugby union for Aviron Bayonnais and Italy.
- Jarryd Hayne – played professional American football for the San Francisco 49ers in the NFL, before switching to rugby sevens to represent Fiji. Currently plays for the Parramatta Eels in the NRL after having played for the Gold Coast Titans upon his return to the NRL. Before leaving for the NFL, he had already played for the Parramatta Eels. Has also represented New South Wales, Fiji and the Kangaroos.
- Iestyn Harris – former five-eighth/fullback for Warrington Wolves, Leeds Rhinos, Bradford Bulls, and Featherstone Rovers who also represented Wales and Great Britain. Played rugby union for Cardiff Blues and Wales. Has previously coached the Crusaders, Salford Red Devils, and Wales.
- John Hopoate – after multiple suspensions forced him to retire from rugby league, he pursued a career in boxing, eventually becoming the Australian heavyweight champion.
- Graeme Hughes – played 116 First-Grade Games for Canterbury-Bankstown, as well as 20 First-Class Cricket Matches for New South Wales. He is the last man to have played both rugby league and cricket for New South Wales.
- Benji Marshall – played Super Rugby for the Blues in 2014, and represented Australia in touch football as a teenager. Plays for the Brisbane Broncos after having previously played for the Wests Tigers and St George-Illawarra Dragons in the NRL, and has represented the NRL All Stars and the Kiwis.
- Anthony Mundine – played for the Dragons, Brisbane Broncos and New South Wales from 1993 to 2000 before switching to boxing.
- Timana Tahu – played in the NRL for the Newcastle Knights, Parramatta Eels and Penrith Panthers as well as representing the Indigenous All Stars, the New Zealand Māori, New South Wales and the Kangaroos. Played rugby union for Denver Stampede, Waratahs, and the Wallabies.
- Jordan Mailata – played for the South Sydney Rabbitohs in the National Rugby League (NRL) and currently for the Philadelphia Eagles of the National Football League (NFL).
- Valentine Holmes – played for the North Queensland Cowboys in the National Rugby League and spend several months on the New York Jets' practice squad.

=== Rugby union ===
- Perry Baker – USA sevens international who played college football at Fairmont State University, was briefly signed by the Philadelphia Eagles of the National Football League (NFL), also played and in the Arena Football League before taking up rugby union.
- Israel Dagg – outside back for the Crusaders and All Blacks who was a Black Caps prospect as a pace bowler.
- Marc Ellis – former Blues, Highlanders and All Black wing who played for the Warriors in the NRL and represented the Kiwis.
- Leki Fotu – high school rugby player and nose tackle for the Arizona Cardinals of the National Football League (NFL).
- Israel Folau – midfielder/outside back for the Waratahs and Wallabies who played for the Melbourne Storm and Brisbane Broncos in the NRL, represented Queensland and the Kangaroos in rugby league, and played for the Greater Western Sydney Giants in the AFL.
- Luke Gross – USA international lock who played basketball at Marshall University before switching to rugby union.
- Karmichael Hunt – played in the NRL for the Brisbane Broncos and represented Queensland and the Kangaroos before joining the Gold Coast Suns in the AFL. Currently plays for the Reds and Wallabies after having also played for Biarritz in the Top 14.
- Carlin Isles – USA sevens international who played college football and ran track at Ashland University before taking up rugby union. Also made the practice squad of the Detroit Lions late in the 2013 season before signing for the Glasgow Warriors in the Pro12.
- John Kirwan – former World Cup-winning All Black wing who played in the NRL for the Warriors. Has gone on to coach the Blues, Barbarians, Italy, and Japan.
- Ngani Laumape – midfielder for the Hurricanes and All Blacks after having previously played for the Warriors.
- Megan Lukan – former Canada sevens international, winning a bronze medal at the 2016 Olympics, Lukan previously played college basketball in the U.S. at Green Bay.
- Kaili Lukan – Younger sister of Megan and current Canada sevens international, winning a gold medal at the 2019 Pan American Games, she also played basketball at Green Bay.
- Dan Lyle – college football player who later played in Premiership Rugby
- Heather Moyse – Canada international in rugby union, both in 15s and sevens, and member of the World Rugby Hall of Fame, Moyse also won gold medals in two-woman bobsleigh at the 2010 and 2014 Winter Olympics, and represented Canada in cycling. In addition, she played soccer and ran track at university level.
- Michael O'Connor – represented Australia in rugby league and rugby union. Played for the Wallabies in 13 Tests from 1979 to 1982 and then the Kangaroos in 17 Tests from 1985 to 1990.
- Hayden Smith – Australian-born USA international lock who played for Saracens. He had trained with Australian NBL side the Sydney Kings before taking up a scholarship to play basketball at the New York Institute of Technology and Metropolitan State University of Denver. He later signed with NFL side the New York Jets as a tight end in 2012.
- Terry Price – Welsh rugby union & league international and later an NFL player for the Buffalo Bills.
- Jason Robinson – former Bath, Bristol, England, and British and Irish Lions outside back who rugby league for Hunslet, Wigan Warriors, England, and Great Britain.
- Mat Rogers – former Waratahs, and Wallabies utility back who played for the Cronulla Sharks and Gold Coast Titans in the NRL, and represented the Kangaroos.
- Melissa Ruscoe – captained the New Zealand national teams in both football and rugby union.
- Wendell Sailor – former Leeds, Reds, Waratahs, and Wallabies wing who played for the Brisbane Broncos and St George-Illawarra Dragons in the NRL, and also represented the Indigenous All Stars, Queensland and the Kangaroos.
- Brad Thorn – former Crusaders, Highlanders, Sanix Blues, Leinster, Leicester, and All Black lock who also played rugby league for the Brisbane Broncos, Queensland, and the Kangaroos. Currently coaches Queensland Country in the NRC.
- Va'aiga Tuigamala – played for the All Blacks and Manu Samoa as well as the Wigan Warriors and Toa Samoa in rugby league.
- Lote Tuqiri – former Waratahs, Leicester, Leinster and Wallabies wing who played for the Brisbane Broncos, Wests Tigers, and South Sydney Rabbitohs in the NRL, and also represented Queensland, Fiji, and the Kangaroos.
- Sonny Bill Williams – plays for the Blues and All Blacks after having also played for Toulon, the Crusaders, Chiefs and Panasonic Wild Knights. Previously played for the Bulldogs and Sydney Roosters in the NRL and represented the Kiwis. He has also boxed professionally six times, and was formerly the NZPBA Heavyweight champion, and the WBA International Heavyweight Champion.
- Jeff Wilson – New Zealand rugby winger who also represented his country at cricket.
- Daniel Adongo – former Kenyan sevens representative who played as a lock/loose forward in the Currie Cup, ITM Cup, and Super Rugby before signing with the Indianapolis Colts in the NFL as a linebacker.
- Alex Gray – former Premiership Rugby, rugby union player, who was on Atlanta Falcons's practice squad as a tight end. Currently a free agent.
- Christian Scotland-Williamson – former rugby union player for the Worcester Warriors, who was on Pittsburgh Steelers' practice squad as a tight end. Currently a free agent.
- Christian Wade – former rugby union Wasps RFC wing, spent three seasons playing American football as a running back for the Buffalo Bills of the National Football League (NFL).
- Psalm Wooching – former college football player for Washington Huskies

=== Sailing ===
- Anna Tobias – is also a CrossFit athlete.
- Jacob Tullin Thams – is also a ski jumper
- Rob Waddell – retired rower, 2000 Olympic gold medalist in single sculls rowing who is a current Team New Zealand crewman as a grinder, he also played rugby union as a lock. He still holds world indoor rowing machine record time over 2000 m and 5000 m.

=== Shooting ===
- Adriana Ruano — was an elite gymnast and competed at the 2010 Pan American Gymnastics Championships before taking up sports shooting.

=== Skateboarding ===
- Sky Brown – also competes in surfing

=== Skiing ===
- Luc Alphand – Alpine Ski World Cup overall title winner that later won the Dakar Rally.
- Pierre Harvey – competed in both cross country skiing and road cycling.
- Ester Ledecka – is also a snowboarder
- Pita Taufatofua – Tongan double-Olympian, competing in taekwondo and cross-country skiing. Competed as a rower but did not qualify. First person to be a country's flagbearer at both Summer and Winter Olympic Games.

=== Ski jumping ===
- Adam Małysz – four-time World Cup winner, four-time World Ski Championships winner, four-time Olympic medalist, then finished 2014 Dakar Rally at the 13th place (cars).
- Daniela Iraschko-Stolz – Olympic medalist in Sochi 2014, also played as goalkeeper in the ÖFB-Frauenliga for Wacker Innsbruck.

=== Skyrunning ===
- Antonella Confortola – Italian female cross-country skier before switching to skyrunning.
- Emelie Forsberg – Swedish female doing ski mountaineering in winters and skyrunning in summers.
- Luis Alberto Hernando – Spanish male biathlete before switching to skyrunning.
- Kílian Jornet Burgada – Catalan male ski mountaineer who has also won world championships in skyrunning.
- Laura Orgué – Spanish female cross-country skier before switching to skyrunning.

=== Snooker ===
- Jim Rempe – majorly plays Pool
- Steve Mizerack – majorly plays Pool
- Allison Fisher – Also plays Pool is a champion in both.

=== Snowboarding ===
- Francesca Canepa – former female Italian professional snowboarder, then became trail runner and sky runner.
- Ayumu Hirano – is also a skateboarder
- Hayley Holt – New Zealand former snowboarder and ballroom dancer. Currently a sports anchor and Radio DJ.
- Shaun Palmer – is an American professional snowboarder, skier, mountain biker, and motocross rider. "Palm Daddy" is known as one of the forefathers of extreme sports.
- Ester Ledecká – female Czech snowboarder and alpine skier.
- Shaun White – was a two time X-Games Skateboard Vert gold medalist along with two silvers, and one bronze medal in his skateboard career. Having been one of the few athletes to compete in both summer and winter X-Games.

=== Strongman ===
- Hafþór Júlíus Björnsson – also a boxer
- Geoff Capes – also a shot putter and boxer
- Hugo Girard – also a boxer
- Eddie Hall – also a boxer
- Mikhail Koklyaev — Powerlifting, Olympic weightlifting, strongman
- Mariusz Pudzianowski – five times World's Strongest Man, then mixed martial artist and boxer
- Don Reinhoudt — Powerlifting, strongman
- Jamie Reeves – also a boxer
- Kelvin de Ruiter – also a boxer
- Jón Páll Sigmarsson — Olympic weightlifting, powerlifting, strongman
- Brian Shaw – also a boxer
- Gary Taylor — Olympic weightlifting, strongman
- Bruce Wilhelm — Olympic weightlifting, strongman
- O. D. Wilson — Powerlifting, strongman

=== Sumo ===
- Agatupu Rodney Anoaʻi (Yokozuna) – was also a professional WWF wrestler
- Wakanohō Toshinori (also known as Soslan Gagloev) – played college football for University of South Florida, Webber International University, and Warner University, currently training for NFL.
- John Tenta – Canadian professional wrestler, started his career as a three-time sumo champion in 1986.

=== Swimming ===
- Gerard Blitz – 2 time Olympic water polo silver, 2× bronze (one in swimming–100-m backstroke).
- Steven Ferguson – is also in canoeing
- Otto Herschmann – Austrian Olympic fencing (sabre; silver) and swimming (100-m freestyle; silver) medalist.
- Robert Hughes – American water polo player and winner of a World's Record in 100yd breaststroke. He competed in the 1952 Summer Olympics and in the 1956 Summer Olympics in Water Polo and 200m breaststroke.
- Duke Kahanamoku – five medals (3 gold, 2 silver) in three Olympics; "Father of Surfing".
- Tim Shaw – competed in Men's Water Polo
- Dara Torres – lettered in volleyball in her fifth and final year at the University of Florida after exhausting her athletic eligibility as a swimmer.
- Johnny Weissmuller – five-time gold medalist in swimming and won water polo bronze medal in 1924 Paris.

=== Tennis ===
- Ashleigh Barty – Wimbledon champion 2021, played for Queensland Fire in the 2015 Women's Big Bash League
- Mary Browne – finished runner-up in 1924 U.S. Women's Amateur in golf.
- Bertrand Milbourne Clark – association football, cricket, golf, and tennis.
- Margaret Curtis – three-time U.S. Women's Amateur champion in golf.
- Lottie Dod – won golf's British Ladies Amateur, played twice for the England women's national field hockey team, and won a silver medal at the 1908 Summer Olympics in archery.
- Jaroslav Drobny – winner of Wimbledon and French Open, and a member of the Czechoslovak ice-hockey team which won a silver medal at the 1948 Winter Olympics. He is in the Hall of Fame for both tennis and ice-hockey.
- Althea Gibson – played on golf's LPGA Tour.
- Spencer Gore – Inaugural Wimbledon champion in 1877, who also played first-class cricket for Surrey
- Frank Hadow – Wimbledon champion in 1878, who played first-class cricket for Middlesex.
- Yevgeny Kafelnikov – former world number one ATP player, professional golfer and played on the PGA Tour.
- Karel Kozeluh – a champion on the professional circuit in the 1920s and 1930s, he also played twice for the Czechoslovakia national football team, and won the 1925 Ice Hockey European Championship with his country in ice hockey in 1925.
- Gael Monfils – with 10 ATP titles by his side, the Frenchman won a Paddle tennis title in Las Vegas 2006, also beating the world number 1 back then, Scott Freedman.
- Jarkko Nieminen – currently plays floorball in Salibandyliiga, which is Finland's primary floorball competition.
- Fred Perry – world table tennis champion 1929.
- Casper Ruud – golf
- Jannik Sinner – Italy's junior level ski champion in giant slalom in 2008 and runner-up in 2012, before turning to pro tennis and becoming world ranking's number 1 on July 10, 2024
- Ion Țiriac – a former singles top 10 player on the ATP Tour, won one Grand Slam title – the 1970 French Open in men's doubles. He also played ice hockey, notably participating as a defenseman for Romania's national team in the 1964 Winter Olympics.
- Ellsworth Vines – played professional golf, reaching the semi-finals of the 1951 PGA Championship.
- Anthony Wilding – World No.1 tennis player who also played first-class cricket for Canterbury.

=== Track and field ===
- Jon Cole – National Champion Discus 1969 and Powerlifting 1968, 1970, 1972
- Willie Davenport – bobsledder at 1980 Winter Olympics.
- Glenn "Jeep" Davis – played with the Detroit Lions in the 1960 and 1961 seasons.
- Mary Decker – three time Olympian; won gold medals in the 1500 meters and 3000 meters at the 1983 World Championships; placed 2nd and 3rd at the 2012 and 2013 ElliptiGO World Championships.
- Gary Gubner – world shot put records and weightlifter.
- Adam Gemili – played football for Dagenham & Redbridge and joined Thurrock F.C. on loan at the end of August 2011, having been at Chelsea F.C. as a child.
- Jim Hines – played in the NFL for the Kansas City Chiefs and Miami Dolphins.
- Destinee Hooker – NCAA high jump champion; 2012 Olympian in volleyball.
- Caitlyn Jenner – Olympic gold medalist and record holder who also raced in IMSA and Trans-Am for Roush Racing.
- Lolo Jones – World Champion in the 100m Hurdles and competed at the 2008 and 2012 Olympics. Also won a medal in the 2 woman bobsleigh at the 2012 World Cup.
- Marion Jones – also played basketball at the University of North Carolina in college, playing on a national championship team in 1994, and was drafted by the Phoenix Mercury, and was reported that she worked out with the San Antonio Silver Stars in November 2009 for the WNBA.
- Alfred Kruger – hammer thrower at the 2004, 2008 and 2012 Olympic Games and played college football as a tight end for the Morningside Mustangs
- Carl Lewis – drafted in the 10th round of the 1984 NBA Draft by the Chicago Bulls (the draft where the Bulls selected Michael Jordan with the number 3 pick), but did not play a game in the NBA. He was also drafted in the 12th round of the 1984 NFL Draft by the Dallas Cowboys as a wide receiver, but was not signed.
- Bob Mathias – running back for the Stanford Cardinal and drafted by Washington Redskins in 1953 NFL draft.
- Renaldo Nehemiah – played in the NFL for the San Francisco 49ers from 1982 to 1984.
- Nova Peris – also played hockey.
- Asha Philip — British sprinter who also represented Great Britain in trampoline gymnastics and was a World Junior Champion in double mini trampoline.
- Jim Thorpe – won two gold medals in the 1912 Summer Olympics in track and field, and later played American football for the Canton Bulldogs, baseball for the New York Giants and basketball in the WFI for an unknown team.
- Tania Vicenzino – Italian long jumper who also competed at bobsleigh World Championships and World Cup.
- Torsten Voss – World decathlon champion in 1987, switched to bobsleigh in 1994 and won 3 world championship medals from 1995 to 1997,
- Herb Washington – played one season as a pinch runner for the Oakland Athletics following the 1972 Olympics.
- Ally Watt – plays soccer

=== Wrestling ===
- Great Antonio – also a strongman
- Jon Andersen – is also a bodybuilder
- Kurt Angle – amateur wrestler who won gold medals at the 1995 World Wrestling Championships and 1996 Summer Olympics before becoming the inaugural world champion for TNA as a professional wrestler who won the TNA Championship for a record six times, while also working for WWE before and after his TNA career.
- Josh Barnett – transitioned from MMA
- Shayna Baszler – transitioned from MMA
- Dave Bautista – performed MMA
- Bianca Belair – competed in track and field
- Stu Bennett – better known as Wade Barrett – English WWE King of the Ring winner and former bare-knuckle boxing champion.
- Big E – competed in powerlifting
- Alexa Bliss – American pro wrestler who started in fitness and figure competitions
- Dan Bobish – also performs MMA
- Kacy Catanzaro – transitioned from gymnastics and obstacle racing
- John Cena – played football at Springfield college, inducted into the hall of fame.
- Mark Coleman – also performs MMA
- Don Frye – also performs MMA
- Doug Furnas – is also a power lifter
- Mark Henry – former Olympic weightlifter, powerlifter and strongman who became a professional wrestler of WWE.
- Katarzyna Juszczak – Polish-born Italian female judoka before switching to freestyle wrestling.
- Bill Kazmaier – is also a strongman
- Mark Kerr – also performs MMA
- The Great Khali – Joined the Yamuna Yoddha Kabaddi team.
- Gene Kiniski – a Canadian professional wrestler who was also a Canadian professional football player for the Edmonton Eskimos.
- Ben Kueter – American freestyle and folkstyle wrestler that is also a linebacker for the Iowa Hawkeyes football team.
- Tom Lawlor – transitioned from MMA
- Madusa – champion professional wrestler turned champion monster truck driver
- Bill Miller – an American professional wrestler who was a three sport athlete at Ohio State University in wrestling, football and track.
- Naoya Ogawa – competed in judo and mixed martial arts.
- Ken Patera – former strongman
- CM Punk – professional wrestler who had two MMA fights in the UFC.
- Ivan Putski – also a bodybuilder
- Roman Reigns – played football for the CFL and the NFL before joining the WWE.
- Matt Riddle – transitioned from MMA
- Alberto Del Rio – transitioned from MMA
- Bas Rutten – is a kickboxer and MMA fighter
- Junior Dos Santos – transition from MMA to wrestling
- Randy Savage – played in 289 minor league baseball games
- Marina Shafir – transitioned from MMA
- Evan Singleton – is also a strongman
- Braun Strowman – former strongman
- Paige Vanzant – transitioned from MMA
- Lola Vice – transitioned from MMA
- Tim Weiss – also played soccer

Wrestlers who medaled in both Greco-Roman and freestyle wrestling in a single event:

- Wilfried Dietrich
- Daniel Robin
- Bilyal Makhov

== Paralympics ==
- Oksana Masters
- Heinz Frei
- Tatyana McFadden
- Reinhild Moller
- Marla Runyan

== See also ==
- Arnold Sports Festival
- Biathlon, Decathlon, Duathlon, Heptathlon, Icosathlon, Iron Man, Octathlon, Pentathlon, Quadrathlon, Triathlon
- Cross-training
- Fencing
- Gymnastics at multi-sport events
- Handball at multi-sport events
- List of athletes who competed in at least five Olympics in two sports
- List of athletes who competed in both the Summer and Winter Olympics
- List of athletes who competed in multiple sports at the Summer Olympic games
- List of athletes who competed in multiple sports at the Winter Olympic games
- List of athletes who played in Major League Baseball and the National Football League
- List of athletes with Olympic medals in different sports
- List of Australian rules football and cricket players
- List of cricket and rugby league players
- List of cricket and rugby union players
- List of English cricket and football players
- List of gridiron football players who became professional wrestlers
- List of mixed martial artists with professional boxing records
- List of multi-sport champions
- List of New Zealand double-international sportspeople
- List of players who have converted from one football code to another
- List of prizefighters with professional boxing and kickboxing records
- List of triathletes
- Nordic combined
- Wrestling at multi-sport events
