= 1946 Australian Championships – Men's singles =

Men's singles
- 1946 Australian Championships

Final
- Champion: (Australia) John Bromwich
- Runner-up: (Australia) Dinny Pails
- Score: 5–7, 6–3, 7–5, 3–6, 6–2

Details
- Draw: 35
- Seeds: 8

Events
Singles	men	women		boys	girls
Doubles	men	women	mixed	boys	girls
- Australian Championships

John Bromwich defeated Dinny Pails 5–7, 6–3, 7–5, 3–6, 6–2 in the final to win the men's singles tennis title at the 1946 Australian Championships.

== Seeds ==
The seeded players are listed below. John Bromwich is the champion; others show the round in which they were eliminated.

1. (Australia) John Bromwich (champion)
2. (Australia) Adrian Quist (semifinals)
3. (Australia) Dinny Pails (finalist)
4. (Australia) Harry Hopman (quarterfinals)
5. (Australia) Jack Crawford (third round)
6. (Australia) Geoffrey Brown (semifinals)
7. (Australia) Lionel Brodie (quarterfinals)
8. (Australia) Jack Harper (quarterfinals)

== Draw ==
=== Key ===
- Q = Qualifier
- WC = Wild card
- LL = Lucky loser
- r = Retired

=== Finals ===
Quarterfinals
1	(Australia) John Bromwich	6	6	6
8	(Australia) Jack Harper	1	2	1
4	(Australia) Harry Hopman	6	3	3	4
6	(Australia) Geoffrey Brown	4	6	6	6
7	(Australia) Lionel Brodie	2	2	0
3	(Australia) Dinny Pails	6	6	6
(Australia) Max Bonner	0	6	6	2
2	(Australia) Adrian Quist	6	8	3	6

Semifinals
1	(Australia) John Bromwich	6	6	6
6	(Australia) Geoffrey Brown	3	2	1
3	(Australia) Dinny Pails	6	6	6
2	(Australia) Adrian Quist	2	4	2

Final
1	(Australia) John Bromwich	5	6	7	3	6
3	(Australia) Dinny Pails	7	3	5	6	2

=== Earlier rounds ===
==== Section 1 ====
First round
(Australia) Mehaffey	0	9	6	3	6
(Australia) Hammond	6	7	2	6	4
(Australia) Rowe	6	6	6
(Australia) Barnett	1	2	1

Second round
1	(Australia) Bromwich	6	6	6
(Australia) Mehaffey	1	3	3
(Australia) Slater	6	6	6
(Australia) Warhurst	0	2	4
8	(Australia) Harper	6	6	6
(Australia) Rowe	0	2	2
(Australia) Sidwell	6	4	6	6
(Australia) Molloy	4	6	1	1

Third round
1	(Australia) Bromwich	6	6	6
(Australia) Slater	4	1	2
8	(Australia) Harper	6	6	6
(Australia) Sidwell	3	2	2

Quarterfinals
1	(Australia) Bromwich	6	6	6
8	(Australia) Harper	1	2	1

==== Section 2 ====
First round

Second round
4	(Australia) Hopman	10	1	0	8	6
(Australia) Schwartz	8	6	6	6	4
(Australia) Turnbull	6	6	6
(Australia) Callaghan	4	1	4
6	(Australia) Brown	6	6	6
(Australia) Lock	1	3	1
(Australia) Sedgman	6	8	6
(Australia) Clements	4	6	3

Third round
4	(Australia) Hopman	6	7	4	6
(Australia) Turnbull	4	5	6	3
6	(Australia) Brown	6	6	6
(Australia) Sedgman	2	1	4

Quarterfinals
4	(Australia) Hopman	6	3	3	4
6	(Australia) Brown	4	6	6	6

==== Section 3 ====
First round

Second round
(Australia) Taylor	0	3	2
(Australia) Schwartz	6	6	6
(Australia) Candy	0	3	2
7	(Australia) Brodie	6	6	6
(Australia) Long	9	9	6
(Australia) Maidens	7	7	2
(Australia) Heathcote	1	2	1
3	(Australia) Pails	6	6	6

Third round
(Australia) Schwartz	6	4	4
7	(Australia) Brodie	8	6	6
(Australia) Long	3	1	2
3	(Australia) Pails	6	6	6

Quarterfinals
7	(Australia) Brodie	2	2	0
3	(Australia) Pails	6	6	6

==== Section 4 ====
First round
(Australia) Diggle	5	7	6	6
(Australia) Davidson	7	5	1	4

Second round
(Australia) Cock	2	4	5
(Australia) Bonner	6	6	7
(Australia) Lapthorne	4	4	1
5	(Australia) Crawford	6	6	6
(Australia) McCarthy	6	6	6
(Australia) Newcombe	0	2	1
(Australia) Diggle	2	3	3
2	(Australia) Quist	6	6	6

Third round
(Australia) Bonner	10	2	6	6
5	(Australia) Crawford	8	6	1	1
(Australia) McCarthy	1	4	3
2	(Australia) Quist	6	6	6

Quarterfinals
(Australia) Bonner	0	6	6	2
2	(Australia) Quist	6	8	3	6

Preceded by 1945 U.S. National Championships	Grand Slam men's singles	Succeeded by 1946 Wimbledon Championships
