= Lionel Brodie =

Australian tennis player

- Country (sports): Australia
- Born: 28 May 1917 Euroa, Australia
- Died: 15 May 1995 (aged 77)

Grand Slam singles results
- Australian Open: QF (1939, 1946, 1947)

Grand Slam doubles results
- Australian Open: SF (1947)

Grand Slam mixed doubles results
- Australian Open: QF (1939)

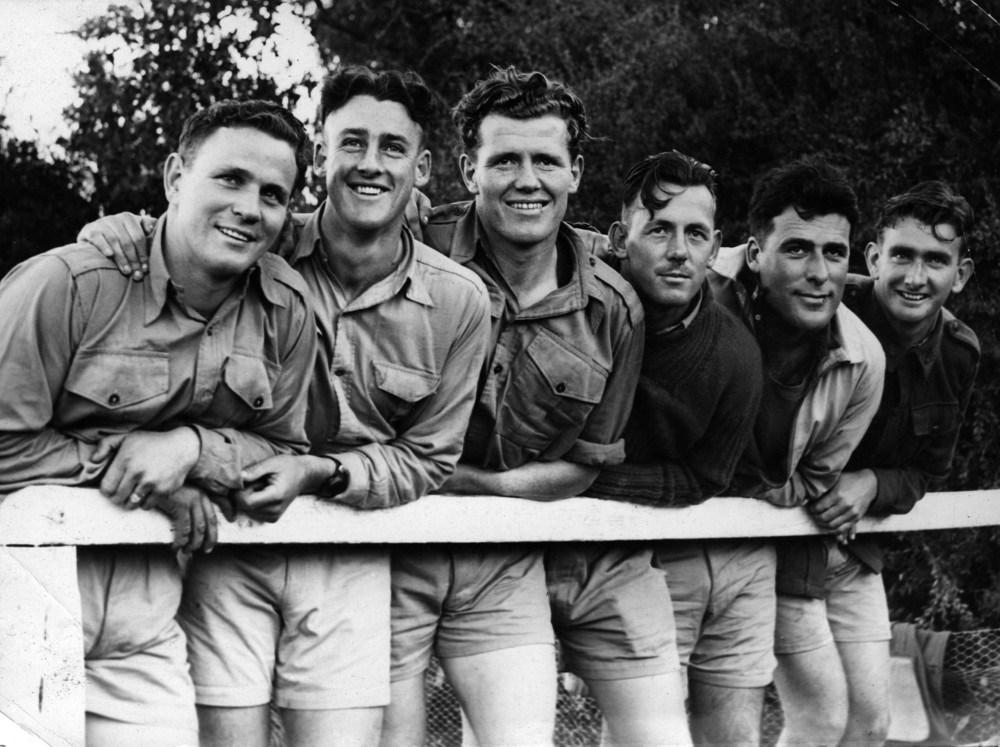
Well-known Australian sports men at Unarmed Combat Training School c.1942, including Lionel Brodie (far right).

Lionel Brodie (28 May 1917 – 15 May 1995) was an Australian amateur tennis player who competed mainly in the 1930s and 1940s.

He reached the quarterfinals of the Australian Championships in 1939, 1946 and 1947. He played in the Davis Cup. He also competed in doubles with good results at both state and national levels. In November 1949 Brodie and doubles partner Bert Tonkin lost to 15-year-olds Lew Hoad and Ken Rosewall in an interstate match at Kooyong (6-3, 6-4).

Brodie was ranked in the top 10 Australian players in 1939, 1940, 1945/6, 1946/7 and 1947/8.

Along with Frank Sedgman and Paul McNamee, Brodie also won the Grace Park Lawn Tennis Club championship, where the club recognises Brodie's contributions by awarding the Pennant Player of the Year the Lionel Brodie Trophy.
