= Max Bonner =

Australian tennis player

- Full name: Maxwell Harry Bonner
- Country (sports): Australia
- Born: 1 March 1917 Perth, Western Australia, Australia
- Died: 1996 Perth, Western Australia
- Turned pro: 1936 (amateur tour)
- Retired: 1950

Singles

Grand Slam singles results
- Australian Open: QF (1946)

Doubles

Grand Slam doubles results
- Australian Open: QF (1946, 1948)

Mixed doubles

Grand Slam mixed doubles results
- Australian Open: 2R (1938, 1949)

Maxwell Harry Bonner (1917–1996) was an Australian tennis player. He was originally from Western Australia, but moved to Victoria in the 1940s. He was singles champion of Western Australia in 1941. He began playing tennis at an early age, as his parents were told to make sure he went outside for health reasons. Aged 23 in September 1940, Bonner became a sergeant in the R. A. A. F. After serving in the Darwin raids, he was discharged on medical grounds. He was a popular player and very agile around the court, but was prone to being erratic. Bonner made his debut at the 1936 Australian championships and lost in round one to Lionel Brodie. In 1937 he lost in round one to Frank Bennett. In 1938 he lost in round one to Adrian Quist. In 1939 he lost in round two to Vivian McGrath. In 1940 he lost in round two to Bill Sidwell. At the Australian championships in 1946, Bonner had the best win of his career against veteran former champion Jack Crawford. The match contained many long gruelling baseline rallies and in the end Bonner wore out his older opponent. Bonner then lost to Quist in the quarter-finals. In 1947 he lost in round two to Brodie. In 1948 and 1949 he lost early to Sidwell. Then Bonner became a professional tennis coach.
