= Ken Slater (sportsman) =

Australian rules footballer and tennis player

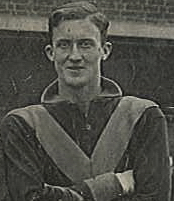
- Born: Kenneth Maling Slater; 22 March 1924; Melbourne, Victoria
- Died: 28 April 1963 (aged 39); Heidelberg, Victoria
Australian rules football career
Personal information
- Original team: Camberwell Grammar School
- Height: 188 cm (6 ft 2 in)
- Weight: 78 kg (172 lb)
Playing career^{1}
Years	Club	Games (Goals)
1943–1945	Hawthorn	27 (20)
- ^{1} Playing statistics correct to the end of 1945.
- Tennis career
- Country (sports): Australia

Grand Slam singles results
- Australian Open: 3R (1946)

Grand Slam doubles results
- Australian Open: 1R (1946, 1948)

Kenneth Maling Slater (22 March 1924 – 28 April 1963) was an Australian sportsman who played Australian rules football and tennis at the highest level. He played his football with Hawthorn in the Victorian Football League (VFL) and competed in two Australian Tennis Championships (now the Australian Open).

== Camberwell Grammar ==
Slater was educated at Camberwell Grammar School, which he represented in athletics, cricket, football, and tennis. It was as a tennis player he most excelled, good enough to win the Under-16 singles titles at both the 1938 and 1939 Victorian Championships at Kooyong. He was described as an exceptionally tall player who moved quickly to the ball.

In 1940, Slater was appointed school captain, but suffered a setback in his sporting career that year when he broke his arm during a football practice match.

The following year, he was a strong performer for the school's cricket team in the Associated Grammar Schools competition. He carried his bat for 172 not out in a win over Ivanhoe and later scored 140 against Haileybury. In 1941, his last year of school, he was also vice-captain of the school's football team and winner of the 1 mile race at the Associated Grammar Schools athletics championships. He finished the year by winning both the boys' singles and doubles titles at the 1941 Victorian Tennis Championships.

== Hawthorn (VFL) ==
Slater, as a 19-year-old, trained with Hawthorn in 1943 and impressed enough to be given six games in the second half of the 1943 VFL season.

The Sporting Globe wrote that he had "all the credentials of a class player" and in the 1944 season he was a regular member of the Hawthorn team, with 15 games. He usually played as a half-forward.

Tennis commitments cast doubt over whether he would continue to play football in 1945, but Hawthorn were able to convince to return for another football season. He only managed six games before he was forced out of the team on medical advice.

== Tennis ==
Slater's tennis career was reaching its peak by the time he played his last game for Hawthorn, he was included in the Victorian interstate team which went to play in Adelaide in December 1945, a squad which included a young Frank Sedgman.

In the 1946 Australian Championships, Slater competed in the men's singles and doubles draws. He received a bye in the first round of the singles, which meant he was to meet a fellow footballer in the second round, Norwood player Tom Warhurst, easily defeated by Slater 6–0, 6–2, 6–4. Slater's opponent in the third round was the top-seeded player, 1939 championship winner John Bromwich, who was too strong for Slater in a straight sets win. He partnered with John Heathcote in the doubles, the pair unable to get past the first round combination of Max Newcombe and Leonard Schwartz.

He also took part in the 1948 Australian Championships, but only in the men's doubles, with Colin Pym. They were narrowly defeated in the first round by Mervyn Rose and Donald Tregonning, 10–12 in the fifth.

== Car accident and later death ==
Slater was left a quadriplegic following a car accident in 1957 and became a patient at the spinal unit in Melbourne's Austin Hospital.

He died at the Austin Hospital in Heidelberg in 1963, at the age of 39.
