= Jim Matthews (sportsman, born 1919) =

Australian sportsman (1919–1999)

- Born: James Aubrey Matthews; 7 November 1919; Culcairn, New South Wales
- Died: 25 June 1999 (aged 79); Albury, New South Wales
- Height: 179 cm (5 ft 10 in)
Australian rules football career
Personal information
- Position: Midfield / forward
Playing career^{1}
Years	Club	Games (Goals)
1942	St Kilda	6 (3)
- ^{1} Playing statistics correct to the end of 1942.
- Tennis career
- Country (sports): Australia

Grand Slam singles results
- Australian Open: 2R (1947)

Grand Slam doubles results
- Australian Open: 1R (1947)

James Aubrey Matthews (7 November 1919 – 25 June 1999) was an Australian rules footballer who played with St Kilda in the Victorian Football League (VFL). He was also a tennis player and competed in the 1947 Australian Championships.

Matthews grew up in the New South Wales town of Culcairn but moved to Albury in 1935 to work as a sporting goods salesman.

In 1942 he played six VFL games with St Kilda, all in successive rounds.

He joined the Army in 1943 and served with the 22nd Australian Field Regiment of the Royal Australian Artillery.

Back at Albury after the war, Matthews was making a name for himself on the local tennis scene and entered the Australian Championships in 1947. He made the second round of the Men's Singles, beating William Edwards. He was then eliminated 6–1, 10–8, 6–2, by Adrian Quist. He also competed in the doubles, with Max Bonner, but they were knocked out in the first round by third seeds Tom Brown and Bill Sidwell.

One of his best achievements in tennis was winning the Men's Country Championship Singles event on three occasions, in 1950, 1953 and 1954. He also had the distinction of touring New Zealand with a NSW representative team.

As a footballer post-war, he was also a New South Wales representative. He is regarded as having been his state's best performer at the 1947 Hobart Carnival, where he played as a centreman.

Matthews played in the New South Wales state team against Western Australia at the Sydney Cricket Ground in June, 1949.

At club level he turned out for Albury, in the Ovens & Murray Football League. He captained-coach Albury to a grand final in 1953, which they lost to Benalla. Often seen at centre half-forward, he was the league's leading goal-kicker in 1953 and won four Albury "Best and Fairest" awards, a club record.
