= Robert McCarthy (tennis) =

Australian tennis player (1924–2001)

- Country (sports): Australia
- Born: 11 February 1924 Sydney, Australia
- Died: 7 February 2001 (aged 76) Baulkham Hills, Australia
- Turned pro: 1945
- Retired: 1958
- Plays: Right-handed

Singles

Grand Slam singles results
- Australian Open: QF (1948)

Doubles

Grand Slam doubles results
- Australian Open: QF (1948)
- Last updated on: 1 November 2016.

Robert Russell McCarthy (11 February 1924 – 7 February 2001) was an Australian tennis player. He reached the quarter-finals in men's singles with Adrian Quist at the 1948 Australian Championships. McCarthy was born in Randwick, Sydney on 11 February 1924, and died in Baulkham Hills on 7 February 2001, at the age of 76.
