= Tennis at the 1904 Summer Olympics =

- Date: 29 August–3 September 1904
- Edition: 3rd
- Surface: Red clay
- Location: World's Fair Stadium (Francis Olympic Field)

Champions

Men's singles
- Beals Wright (USA)

Men's doubles
- Beals Wright / Edgar Leonard (USA)
- Summer Olympics

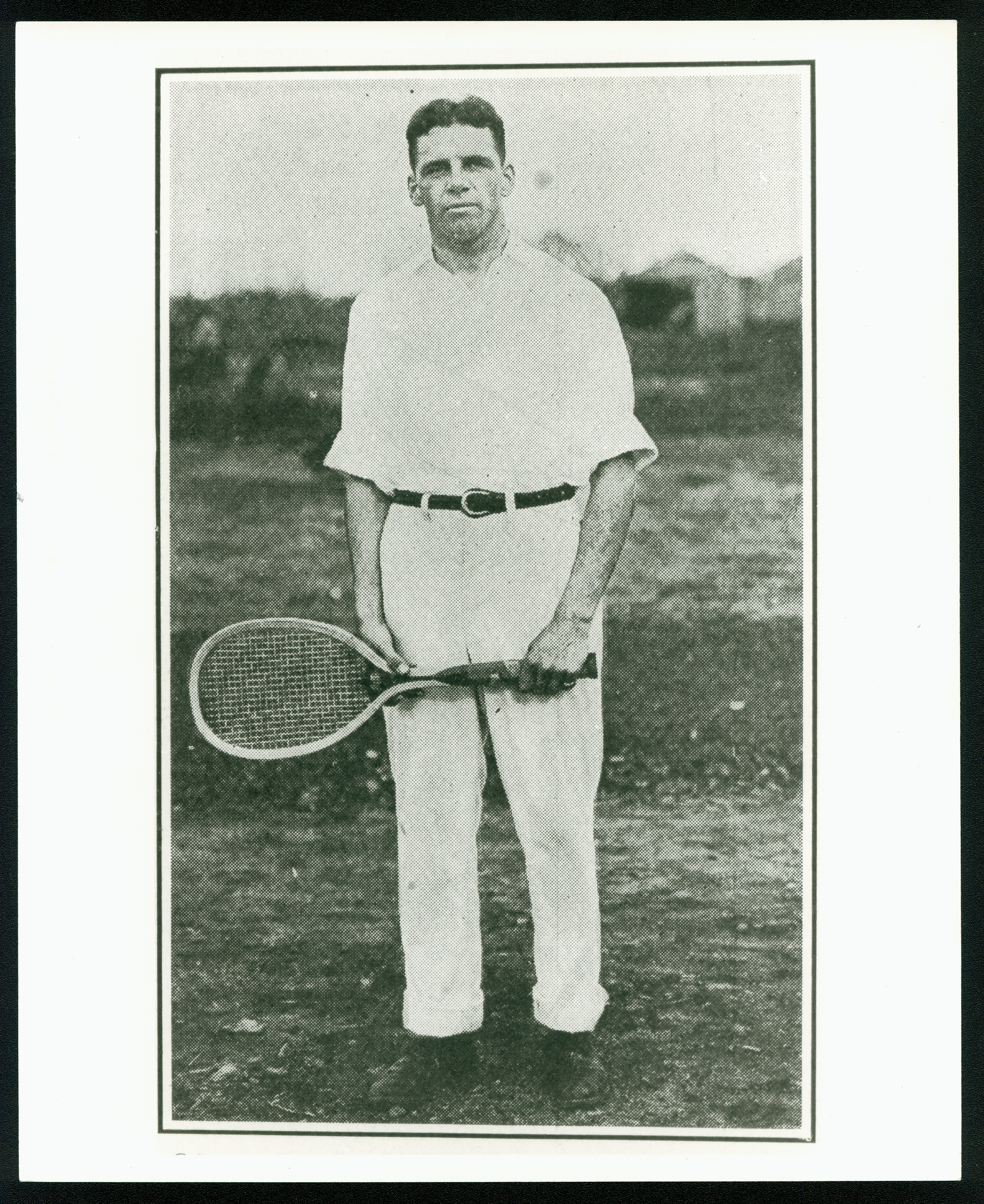
Beals Wright in 1904

Two events in tennis were contested at the 1904 Summer Olympics in St. Louis, United States. The competitions were held from Monday, August 29, 1904 to Monday, September 5, 1904.

== Medal summary ==
=== Events ===
Event	Gold	Silver	Bronze
Men's singles	Beals Wright; United States	Robert LeRoy; United States	Alphonzo Bell; United States Edgar Leonard; United States
Men's doubles	United States; Beals Wright; Edgar Leonard	United States; Robert LeRoy; Alphonzo Bell	United States; Clarence Gamble; Arthur Wear United States; Joseph Wear; Allen West

=== Medal table ===
Rank	Nation	Gold	Silver	Bronze	Total
1	United States	2	2	4	8
Totals (1 entries)		2	2	4	8

== Participating nations ==
A total of 45 tennis players from 2 nations competed at the St. Louis Games:

- Germany (2)
- United States (43)
