= Malcolm MacDonald (disambiguation) =

Malcolm MacDonald (1901–1981) was a British politician and diplomat.

Malcolm MacDonald (or variant spellings) may also refer to:

== Arts and entertainment ==
- Malcolm MacDonald (composer) (1916–1992), British composer
- Malcolm McDonald (director), director of the 2007 Australian documentary film Mawson – Life and Death in Antarctica
- Malcolm MacDonald (music critic) (1948–2014), music critic and author
- Malcolm Ross-MacDonald (1932-2024), British writer

== Politics ==
- Malcolm MacDonald (Canadian politician) (1836–1902), Canadian politician and ship owner
- Malcolm Archibald Macdonald (1875–1941), Canadian judge and politician

== Sport ==
- Malcolm Macdonald (born 1950), English international footballer who played for Luton, Newcastle United and Arsenal
- Malcolm MacDonald (baseball) (1872–1946), outfielder in Major League Baseball
- Malcolm MacDonald (tennis) (1865–1921), American Olympic tennis player
- Malky MacDonald (1913–1999), Scottish-born footballer and manager who played for Celtic, Kilmarnock and Brentford

== Other people ==
- Malcolm Macdonald (engineer) (born 1978), Scottish space engineer and academic
- Callum Macdonald (1912–1999), also known as Malcolm Macdonald, Scottish printer and publisher
