= Fred Sanderson (tennis) =

American tennis player

- Born: July 28, 1872 Galesburg, Illinois, United States
- Died: August 2, 1928 (aged 56) Galesburg, Illinois, United States

Fred Sanderson (July 28, 1872 – August 2, 1928) was an American tennis player. He competed in the men's singles event at the 1904 Summer Olympics.

== Biography ==
Sanderson attended Knox College, where he played numerous sports including baseball, golf, and polo. After graduating from Knox, Sanderson became a presence on the regional tennis circuit, playing in numerous tournaments around the midwest United States.

At the 1904 Summer Olympics, Sanderson entered into both the men's singles and men's doubles events. In the men's singles events, Sanderson received a bye in the first round, won by walkover against Elliot in the second round, and lost to eventual silver medalist Robert LeRoy in the third round in straight sets. Partnered with Thomas Holland in the men's doubles competition, the pair ended up withdrawing prior to the start of the event.

Sanderson died on August 2, 1928 after he suffered paralysis.

== Personal life ==
Sanderson was the son of Henry Sanderson, who was the first major of Galesburg.
