= 1907 U.S. National Championships – Men's singles =

Men's singles
- 1907 U.S. National Championships

Final
- Champion: (United States) William Larned
- Runner-up: (United States) William Clothier
- Score: walkover

Events
Singles	men	women
Doubles	men	women
← 1906 ·	U.S. National Championships	· 1908 →

William Larned defeated Robert LeRoy 6–2, 6–2, 6–4 in the all comers' final to win the men's singles tennis title at the 1907 U.S. National Championships. Defending champion William Clothier was unable to defend his title in the Challenge Round due to an injury in his right leg. The event was held at the Newport Casino in Newport, R.I. in the United States.

== Draw ==
=== Challenge round ===
Challenge Round
(United States) William Clothier
(United States) William Larned	w/o

=== All Comers' finals ===
Quarterfinals
(United States) H. LaVerne Westfall	4	1	0
(United States) William Larned	6	6	6
(United States) Clarence Hobart	6	6	5	5	6
(United States) Wallace F. Johnson	4	3	7	7	2
(United States) Henry Mollenhauer	6	11	5	6
(United States) Leroy Russ	4	9	7	4
(United States) Richard Palmer	0	2	2
(United States) Robert LeRoy	6	6	6

Semifinals
(United States) William Larned	6	6	6
(United States) Clarence Hobart	2	2	1
(United States) Henry Mollenhauer	6	4	6	6	0
(United States) Robert LeRoy	4	6	1	8	6

Finals
(United States) William Larned	6	6	6
(United States) Robert LeRoy	2	2	4

=== Earlier rounds ===
==== Section 1 ====
First round
(United States) HL Westfall	6	6	6
(United States) C Hale	3	3	3
AN Reggio	6	6	6
(United States) J Brown	3	3	4

Second round
(United States) SH Hooper	4	3	0
(United States) MS Charlock	6	6	6
JAC Colston	w/o
(United States) WC Grant
(United States) GH Nettleton	w/o
(United States) HE Foster
(United States) HL Westfall	w/o
AN Reggio

Third round
(United States) MS Charlock	6	6	1	6
JAC Colston	3	8	6	8
(United States) GH Nettleton	1	1	4
(United States) HL Westfall	6	6	6

Fourth round
JAC Colston	2	3	3
(United States) HL Westfall	6	6	6

==== Section 2 ====
First round
(United States) IC Wright	8	6	6
(United States) HI Foster	6	4	2
(United States) FC Colston	6	6	6
(United States) G Wagner	2	3	3
(United States) EW Catlin	6	6	6
(United States) GA Richardson	4	2	0
(United States) W Larned	6	6	6
(United States) TR Pell	4	2	0
(United States) CE Sands	6	6	6
(United States) RUN Gambrill	0	1	1
(United States) SP Henshaw	w/o
(United States) RD Little
JA Fowler	6	6	6
(United States) LJ Grant	3	3	4
GC Thomas Jr.	6	6	6
R Hodges	4	4	1

Second round
(United States) IC Wright	6	6	4	8
(United States) FC Colston	2	2	6	6
(United States) EW Catlin	0	0	2
(United States) W Larned	6	6	6
(United States) CE Sands	6	6	6
(United States) SP Henshaw	3	1	4
JA Fowler	6	6	4	6
GC Thomas Jr.	0	4	6	4

Third round
(United States) IC Wright	0	3	3
(United States) W Larned	6	6	6
(United States) CE Sands	6	6	6
JA Fowler	2	2	2

Fourth round
(United States) W Larned	6	6	6
(United States) CE Sands	1	3	2

==== Section 3 ====
First round
(United States) C Hobart	4	6	6	6
(United States) H Slocum	6	2	4	4
(United States) H Beyer	w/o
(Austria-Hungary) Count Salm
HF Franklin	w/o
AE Kent
HB Register	6	6	6	6
(United States) W McDunn	8	3	3	1
CM Rodgers	6	6	7
CE Van Vleck	2	2	5
(United States) CM Bull	7	6	7
JO Downey	5	1	5
TW Potter	w/o
(United States) L Biddle
W Bigelow	w/o
FJ Otis

Second round
(United States) C Hobart	6	6	6
(United States) H Beyer	0	3	2
HF Franklin	2	2	1
HB Register	6	6	6
CM Rodgers	3	8	1	4
(United States) CM Bull	6	6	6	6
TW Potter	4	6	6	5	6
W Bigelow	6	1	3	7	2

Third round
(United States) C Hobart	6	6	6
HB Register	1	2	0
(United States) CM Bull	6	6	6
TW Potter	1	2	1

Fourth round
(United States) C Hobart	6	7	6
(United States) CM Bull	4	5	2

==== Section 4 ====
First round
(United States) T Gross	5	7	6	7
(United States) D Mathey	7	5	1	5
(United States) AS Dabney	6	6	9
HC Pell	2	1	7
(United States) W Johnson	w/o
WH Gray
AL Hoskins	w/o
(United States) JDE Jones
(United States) H Jonson	6	3	6	6
HL Hitchcock	0	6	2	2
(United States) F Anderson	6	1	6	6
(United States) JR Carpenter	3	6	1	1
(United States) N Stevens	6	6	6
(United States) RD Nelson	1	1	0
(United States) P Gardner	8	6	6
WGD Morgan	6	0	1

Second round
(United States) T Gross	6	6	7
(United States) AS Dabney	4	3	5
(United States) W Johnson	6	6	6
AL Hoskins	2	2	4
(United States) H Jonson	3	5	6	6	2
(United States) F Anderson	6	7	3	3	6
(United States) N Stevens	1	6	1
(United States) P Gardner	6	8	6

Third round
(United States) T Gross	9	2	1
(United States) W Johnson	11	6	6
(United States) F Anderson	6	6	6
(United States) P Gardner	3	2	3

Fourth round
(United States) W Johnson	6	2	6	6
(United States) F Anderson	0	6	3	4

==== Section 5 ====
First round
(United States) F Inman	6	6	6
EH Frank	0	2	2
(United States) E Torrey	w/o
(United States) M White
GMW Kobbe	5	1	6	6	6
(United States) J Thomas	7	6	2	3	1
LW Scott	8	6	6
(United States) W Preston	6	3	2
WH Trotter	6	6	6
(United States) WV Bennett	4	1	3
(United States) H Mollenhauer	6	6	6
CR Tucker	1	1	2
(United States) A Goadby	w/o
CF Watson Jr.
(United States) C Rodgers	6	4	6	6	6
(United States) H MacKinney	8	6	3	4	1

Second round
(United States) F Inman	6	6	6
(United States) E Torrey	1	4	4
GMW Kobbe	5	2	5
LW Scott	7	6	7
WH Trotter	6	0	11	4
(United States) H Mollenhauer	2	6	13	6
(United States) A Goadby	0	1	4
(United States) C Rodgers	6	6	6

Third round
(United States) F Inman	6	6	6
LW Scott	0	1	4
(United States) H Mollenhauer	5	6	6	6
(United States) C Rodgers	7	4	2	4

Fourth round
(United States) F Inman	4	4	6	0
(United States) H Mollenhauer	6	6	1	6

==== Section 6 ====
First round
(United States) GT Adee	6	6	6
(United States) CL Frailey	4	2	2
(United States) N Thornton	w/o
(United States) E Stille
(United States) M Chace	w/o
GA Thompson
(United States) AS Sweetser	6	6	6
(United States) DF Appleton	1	3	3
RT Townsend	6	6	6
(United States) GA Phelps	0	3	2
(United States) L Russ	6	6	10
(United States) WM Fischer	1	1	8
(United States) H Plummer	6	6	6
(United States) S Johnson	1	2	3
(United States) G Beals	w/o
(United States) B Wright

Second round
(United States) GT Adee	3	2	6
(United States) N Thornton	6	6	8
(United States) M Chace	6	4	5	6	6
(United States) AS Sweetser	4	6	7	4	0
RT Townsend	3	3	3
(United States) L Russ	6	6	6
(United States) H Plummer	6	6	3	2	6
(United States) G Beals	2	2	6	6	8

Third round
(United States) N Thornton	6	6	6
(United States) M Chace	2	2	4
(United States) L Russ	6	6	4	5	6
(United States) G Beals	4	4	6	7	4

Fourth round
(United States) N Thornton	11	1	1	3
(United States) L Russ	9	6	6	6

==== Section 7 ====
First round
(United States) RH Palmer	6	4	4	6	8
(United States) KH Behr	3	6	6	2	6
(United States) SA Cushman	6	6	6
(United States) J Talmage	2	2	4
(United States) C Pell	6	6	7	7
(United States) GC Hinckley	3	3	9	5
GF Parrish	3	7	4	7	8
HP Cross	6	5	6	5	6
EV Page	6	6	6
(United States) P Fosdick	2	2	3
JO Ames	6	6	6
JA Ross	3	2	1
(United States) N Niles	6	6	6
(United States) RW Wilson	1	0	4
(United States) H Tallant	6	6	6
(United States) A Ingraham	1	1	4

Second round
(United States) RH Palmer	6	6	6
(United States) SA Cushman	3	0	3
(United States) C Pell	6	6	6
GF Parrish	2	1	4
EV Page	2	4	3
JO Ames	6	6	6
(United States) N Niles	0	6	6	2	6
(United States) H Tallant	6	3	3	6	4

Third round
(United States) RH Palmer	6	6	4	6
(United States) C Pell	0	3	6	4
JO Ames	5	2	6
(United States) N Niles	7	6	8

Fourth round
(United States) RH Palmer	5	8	8	4	6
(United States) N Niles	7	6	6	6	2

==== Section 8 ====
First round
(United States) R LeRoy	w/o
BM Grant

Second round
(United States) R LeRoy	w/o
(United States) WB Howe
(United States) HA Sands	6	1	6	4	4
(United States) A Holmes	1	6	4	6	6
(United States) HW Warner
(United States) D Partridge	w/o
RR Livingston	2	1	2
(United States) RF Lovering	6	6	6

Third round
(United States) R LeRoy	6	6	6
(United States) A Holmes	1	4	4
(United States) D Partridge	4	1	4
(United States) RF Lovering	6	6	6

Fourth round
(United States) R LeRoy	6	6	6
(United States) RF Lovering	3	1	4

Preceded by 1906 Wimbledon Championships – Men's singles	Grand Slam men's singles	Succeeded by 1907 Australasian Championships – Men's singles
