= Mollenhauer =

Mollenhauer is a surname. Notable people with the surname include:

- Edward Mollenhauer (1827–1914), American violinist and composer
- Emil Mollenhauer (1855–1927), American musician, orchestra violinist and conductor
- Henry Mollenhauer (born 1876), American tennis player
- Klaus Mollenhauer (1928–1998), German pedagogical theorist
- Paula Mollenhauer (1908–1988, German athlete and Olympian
