= John Stewart Tritle =

American businessman

- Born: March 22, 1871; Virginia City, Nevada, United States
- Died: March 7, 1947 (aged 75); St. Petersburg, Florida, United States
- Burial place: St. Louis, Missouri
- Education: Yale University
- Children: John S Tritle Junior; Clarence H Tritle
- Parents: Frederick Augustus Tritle (father); Jane Catherine Hereford (mother)
- Tennis career
- Country (sports): United States

Other tournaments
- Olympic Games: L (1904)

Other doubles tournaments
- Olympic Games: L (1904)

John Stewart Tritle (March 22, 1871 – March 7, 1947) was an American businessman and tennis player. The son of Arizona Territory governor Frederick Augustus Tritle, Tritle directed the construction of the Louisiana Purchase Exposition and competed in the men's singles and doubles events at the 1904 Summer Olympics which were held as a part of the Exposition.

After the Exposition, he became the general manager of the Kansas City district of Westinghouse Electric Corporation, and retired as the Vice President for the Pittsburgh office.
