= Tennis at the 1904 Summer Olympics – Men's doubles =

Men's doubles tennis at the Games of the III Olympiad
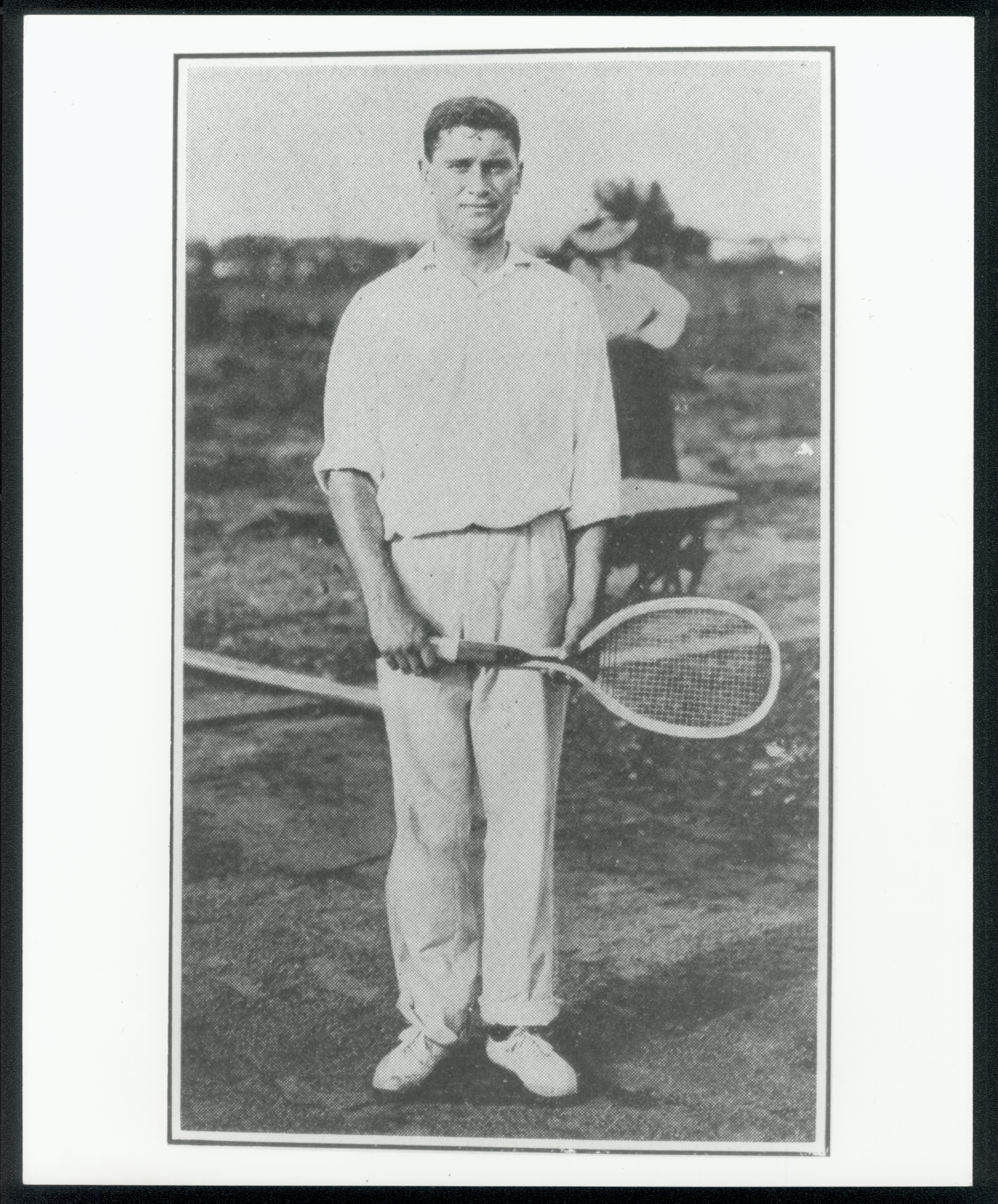
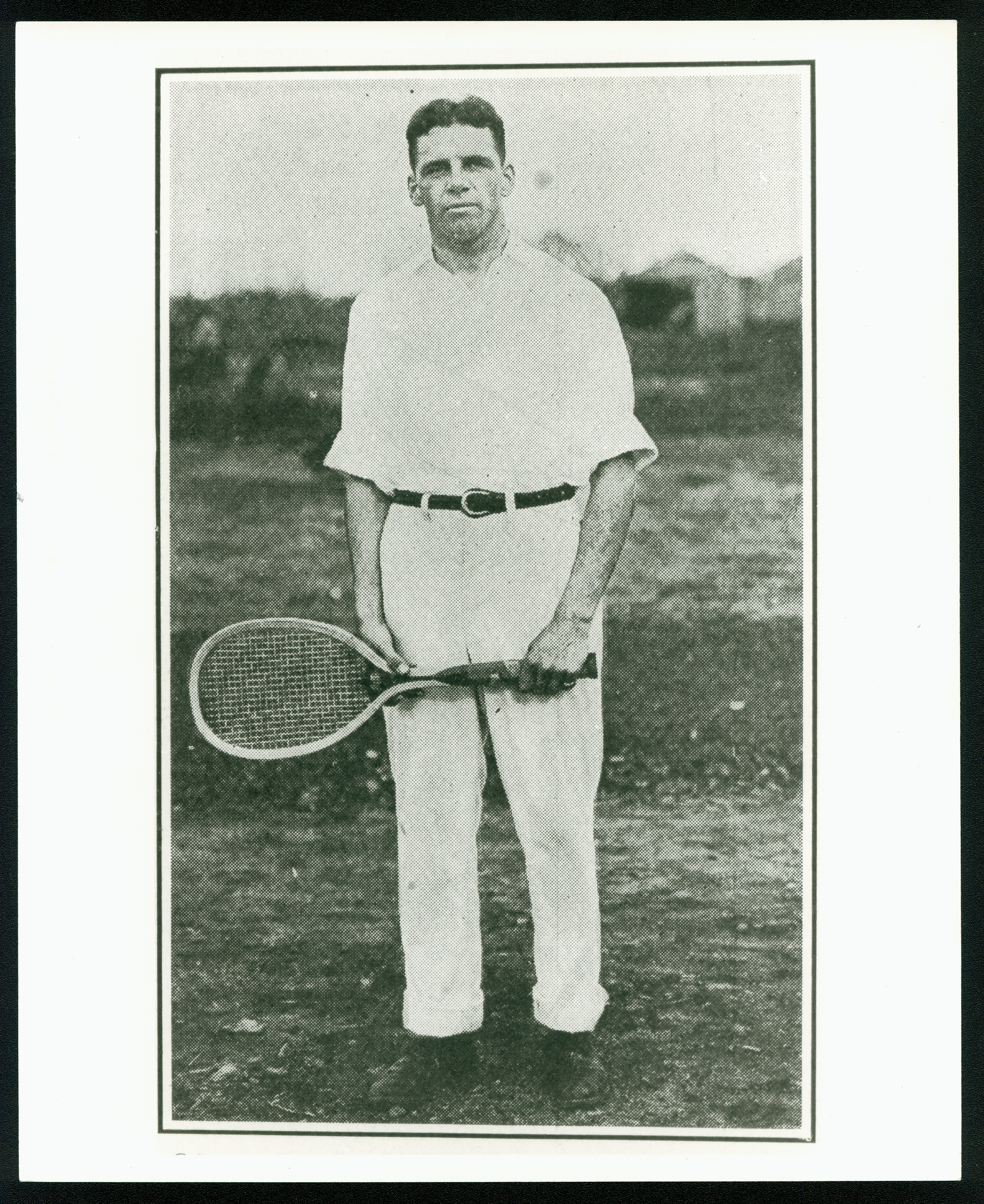
- Edgar Leonard Beals Wright
- Venue: Francis Field
- Dates: 29 August–3 September 1904
- Competitors: 15 teams (30 players) from 2 nations

Medalists
1st place, gold medalist(s)		Edgar Leonard; Beals Wright; United States
2nd place, silver medalist(s)		Alphonzo Bell; Robert LeRoy; United States
3rd place, bronze medalist(s)		Clarence Gamble; Arthur Wear; United States
3rd place, bronze medalist(s)		Joseph Wear; Allen West; United States

Men's doubles
- Tennis at the 1904 Summer Olympics

Events
Singles	men
Doubles	men
- Summer Olympics

The men's doubles was a tennis event held as part of the tennis program at the 1904 Summer Olympics. It was the third time the event was held at the Olympics. There were 30 players from 2 nations, comprising 15 pairs including one mixed team. All medals were won by Americans. The event was won by Edgar Leonard and Beals Wright, defeating Alphonzo Bell and Robert LeRoy in the final. The two bronze medal pairs were Clarence Gamble (tennis)/Arthur Wear and Joseph Wear/Allen West. The medals were the first credited to the United States in the men's doubles, though an American had been part of a silver medal mixed team in 1900.

== Background ==
This was the third appearance of the men's doubles tennis. The event has been held at every Summer Olympics where tennis has been on the program: from 1896 to 1924 and then from 1988 to the current program. A demonstration event was held in 1968.

The competition was largely limited to American players, with one international entrant. The British brothers Laurence Doherty and Reginald Doherty, 1900 Olympic champions and nearing the conclusion of their eight-year Wimbledon win streak, were notable absences.

The United States and Germany each made their second appearance in the event.

== Competition format ==
The competition was a single-elimination tournament with no bronze-medal match (both semifinal losers tied for third). All matches before the final were best-of-three sets; the final was best-of-five sets. Tiebreaks had not been invented yet.

== Schedule ==
Date	Time	Round
Wednesday, 31 August; Thursday, 1 September; Friday, 2 September; Saturday, 3 September		Round of 16; Quarterfinals; Semifinals; Final

== Draw ==
Key

- Q = Qualifier
- WC = Wild card
- LL = Lucky loser
- Alt = Alternate
- ITF = ITF entry
- PR = Protected ranking
- SR = Special ranking
- SE = Special exempt
- JE = Junior exempt
- JR = Junior Accelerator Programme entrant
- CO = College Accelerator Programme entrant
- NG = Next Gen Accelerator Program entrant
- w/o = Walkover
- r = Retired
- d = Defaulted

== Results ==
First round
E Leonard (USA); B Wright (USA)	6	7
W Blatherwick (USA); O Vernon (USA)	4	5
C Cresson (USA); S Russ (USA)	7	6
F Montgomery (USA); S Tritle (USA)	5	2
C Gamble (USA); A Wear (USA)	6	7
J Charles (USA); NM Smith (USA)	3	5
E Hunter (USA); F Wheaton (USA)
J Cunningham (USA); J Neely (USA)	w/o
D Davis (USA); McKittrick (USA)	6	6
M MacDonald (USA); N Semple (USA)	1	1
A Bell (USA); R LeRoy (USA)	6	6
P Gleeson (USA); H Hardy (GER)	3	1
H Jones (USA); H Kauffman (USA)	6	8
F Semple (USA); G Stadel (USA)	1	6
J Wear (USA); A West (USA)	6	6
A Drew (USA); D Turner (USA)	3	4

Quarterfinals
E Leonard (USA); B Wright (USA)	6	5	6
C Cresson (USA); S Russ (USA)	2	7	3
C Gamble (USA); A Wear (USA)	6	6
E Hunter (USA); F Wheaton (USA)	1	4
D Davis (USA); McKittrick (USA)	6	4
A Bell (USA); R LeRoy (USA)	8	6
H Jones (USA); H Kauffman (USA)	3	6	4
J Wear (USA); A West (USA)	6	4	6

Semifinals
E Leonard (USA); B Wright (USA)	6	6
C Gamble (USA); A Wear (USA)	1	2
A Bell (USA); R LeRoy (USA)	2	6	6
J Wear (USA); A West (USA)	6	1	2

Final (gold-medal match)
E Leonard (USA); B Wright (USA)	6	6	6
A Bell (USA); R LeRoy (USA)	4	4	2
