= Ralph McKittrick =

American golfer and tennis player

Medal record

Men's Golf

Representing United States

Olympic Games
Silver medal – second place	1904 St. Louis	Team

Ralph McKittrick (August 17, 1877 – May 4, 1923) was an American golfer and tennis player who competed in the 1904 Summer Olympics.

In 1904 McKittrick was part of the American team which won the silver medal in the team golf event. He finished eleventh in this competition. In the individual competition he finished first in the qualification but was eliminated in the second round of the match play.

McKittrick also competed in the single tennis competition but was eliminated in the second round. With his partner Dwight F. Davis he also participated in the tennis doubles tournament, where they were eliminated in the quarter-finals.

He graduated from Harvard University.
