= Rollin Feitshans =

American tennis player

- Born: March 4, 1881 Illinois, United States
- Died: January 11, 1952 (aged 70) Los Angeles, California, United States

Frederick Rollin Feitshans (March 4, 1881 – January 11, 1952) was an American tennis player. He competed in the men's singles event at the 1904 Summer Olympics. His grandson is Buzz Feitshans, producer.
