= Dwight F. Davis =

American politician and tennis player

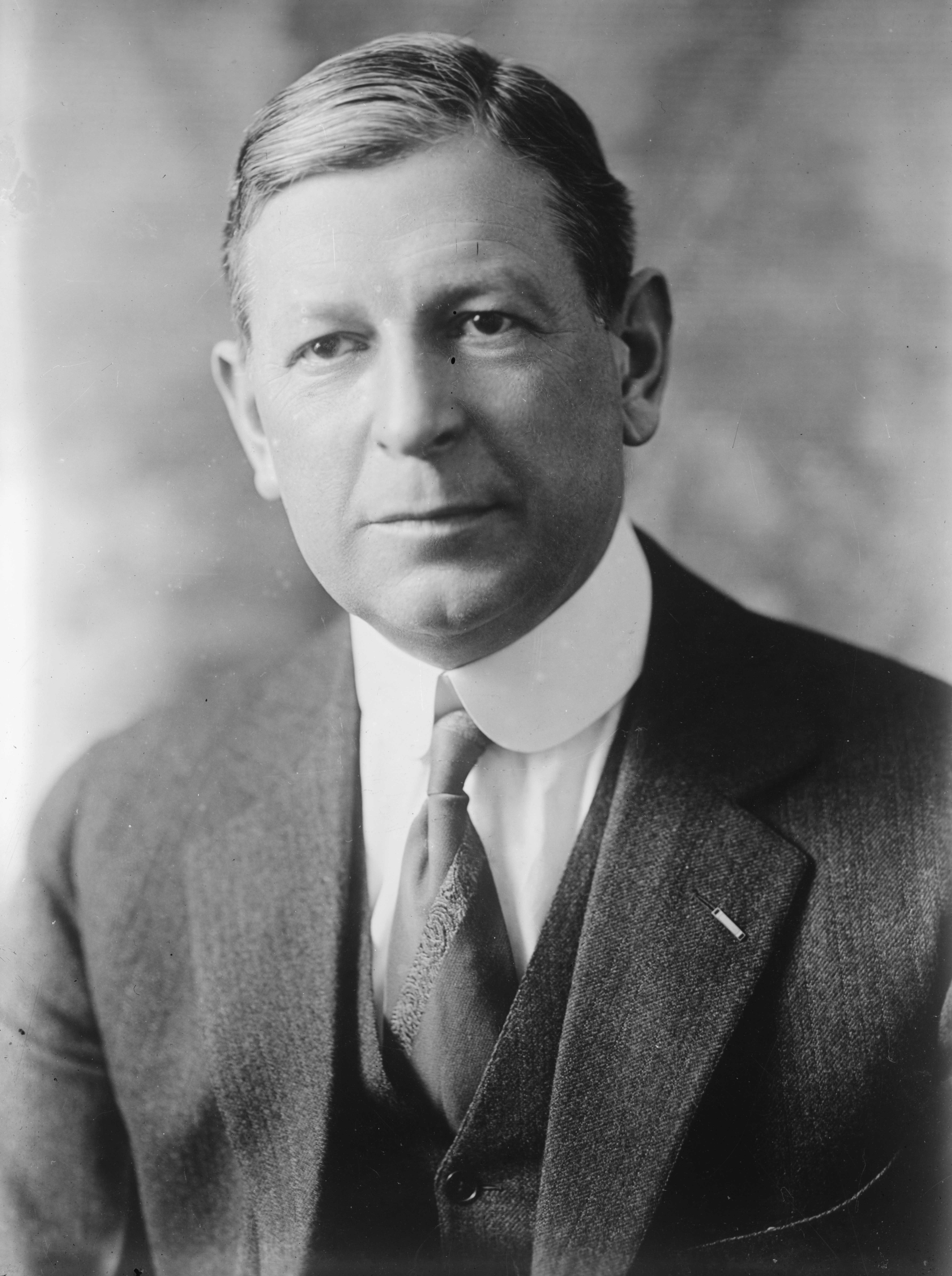

Governor-General of the Philippines
- In office July 8, 1929 – January 9, 1932
- President: Herbert Hoover
- Preceded by: Eugene Allen Gilmore (acting)
- Succeeded by: George C. Butte (acting)

49th United States Secretary of War
- In office October 14, 1925 – March 4, 1929
- President: Calvin Coolidge
- Preceded by: John W. Weeks
- Succeeded by: James Good

United States Assistant Secretary of War
- In office 1923–1925
- Appointed by: Calvin Coolidge
- Preceded by: Mayhew Wainwright
- Succeeded by: Hanford MacNider

Personal details
- Born: Dwight Filley Davis; July 5, 1879 St. Louis, Missouri, U.S.
- Died: November 28, 1945 (aged 66) Washington, D.C., U.S.
- Party: Republican
- Spouse(s): Helen Brooks (m. 1905; died 1932) Pauline Sabin (m. 1936)
- Education: Harvard University (BA); Washington University (LLB)
- Tennis career
- Turned pro: 1895 (amateur tour)
- Retired: 1902
- Plays: Left-handed (one-handed backhand)
- Int. Tennis HoF: 1956 (member page)

Singles
- Highest ranking: No. 5 (1900)

Grand Slam singles results
- US Open: F (1898)

Other tournaments
- Olympic Games: 2R (1904)

Grand Slam doubles results
- Wimbledon: F (1901)
- US Open: W (1899, 1900, 1901)

Other doubles tournaments
- Olympic Games: QF (1904)

Team competitions
- Davis Cup: W (1900, 1902)

Dwight Filley Davis Sr. (July 5, 1879 – November 28, 1945) was an American tennis player and politician. He is best remembered as the founder of the Davis Cup international tennis competition. He was the Assistant Secretary of War from 1923 to 1925 and Secretary of War from 1925 to 1929.

== Early life ==
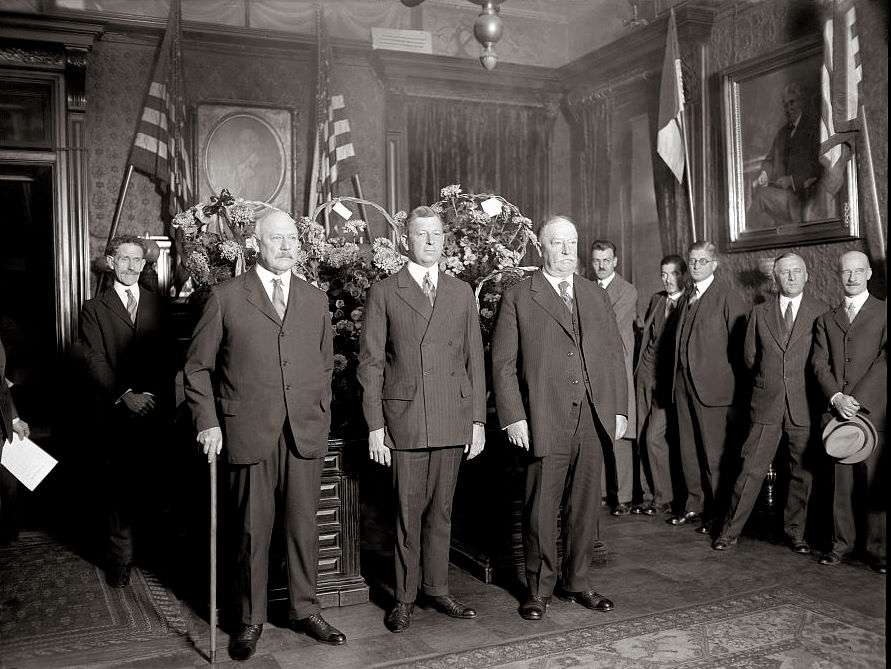
Swearing in of Davis as Secretary of War in 1925

Dwight Filley Davis was born in St. Louis, Missouri, on July 5, 1879. His grandfather, Oliver Dwight Filley, was mayor of St. Louis from 1858 to 1861. A cousin, Chauncey Ives Filley, served as mayor of St. Louis from 1863 to 1864.

== Tennis ==
He reached the All-Comers final for the singles title at the U.S. Championships in 1898 and 1899. He then teamed up with Holcombe Ward and won the doubles title at the U.S. Championships for three years in a row from 1899 to 1901. Davis and Ward were also doubles runners-up at Wimbledon in 1901. Davis also won the American intercollegiate singles championship of 1899 as a student at Harvard College.

=== Davis Cup ===
In 1900 Davis developed the structure for, and donated a silver bowl to go to the winner of, a new international tennis competition designed by him and three others known as the International Lawn Tennis Challenge, which was later renamed the Davis Cup in his honor. He was a member of the US team that won the first two competitions in 1900 and 1902, and was also the captain of the 1900 team.

Davis participated in the 1904 Summer Olympics. He was eliminated in the second round of the singles tournament. In the doubles tournament he and his partner Ralph McKittrick lost in the quarter-finals.

He was inducted into the National Tennis Hall of Fame (now known as the International Tennis Hall of Fame) in 1956 in recognition of his contributions to the sport both as a player and an administrator.

== Political service ==
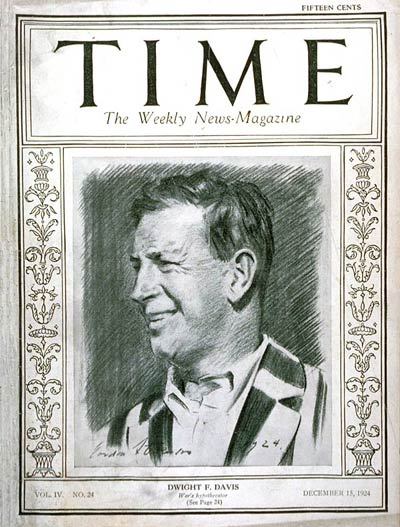
Time cover, December 15, 1924

After Harvard Davis attended Washington University School of Law, though he was never a practicing attorney. He was, however, politically active in his home town of St. Louis and served as the city's public parks commissioner from 1911 to 1915. During his tenure, he expanded athletic facilities and created the first municipal tennis courts in the United States. He sought the Republican nomination in the 1920 Missouri Senate election, receiving 38.2% in the primary. He served under President Calvin Coolidge as Assistant Secretary of War (1923–1925) and as Secretary of War (1925–1929). He then served as Governor General of the Philippines (1929–1932) under Herbert Hoover.

== Army service ==
Davis trained at the Preparedness Movement Citizens' Military Training Camp in 1915. From 1916 to 1917 he toured Europe as part of the Rockefeller War Relief Board. With war declared Davis enlisted as a private in the Missouri National Guard and was commissioned in August 1917.

Going to France, Davis was promoted to Major and became adjutant of the 69th Infantry Brigade of the 35th Infantry Division. During this period he was awarded the Distinguished Service Cross. After the war, he was a colonel in the Officer Reserve Corps.

In 1942 Davis was the first and only Director General of the short lived Army Specialist Corps. On the disbandment of the unit became an advisor with the rank of Major General.

== Personal life ==
Davis and his first wife, Helen, attending the 1926 Army–Navy Game

Davis’ first wife, Helen Brooks, whom he married in 1905, died in 1932. He married Pauline Sabin in 1936.

His daughter Alice Brooks Davis was married to the British Ambassador to the United States Sir Roger Makins. Another daughter, Cynthia Davis, was married to banker William McChesney Martin Jr., the longest-serving Federal Reserve director (1951–1970) who served under five presidents (Truman to Nixon).

He wintered in Florida from 1933 until his death, living at Meridian Plantation, near Tallahassee.

== Honors and awards ==
Commander of the Order of Legion of Honour (1932)

== Death ==
Davis died at his home in Washington, D.C., on November 28, 1945, after a six-month illness. He was buried at Arlington National Cemetery.

== Distinguished Service Cross citation ==
War Department, General Orders No. 9 (1923)

== Legacy ==
Davis was honored with a star on the St. Louis Walk of Fame.

Political offices
Preceded by John W. Weeks	U.S. Secretary of War; Served under: Calvin Coolidge; October 14, 1925 – March 4, 1929	Succeeded by James W. Good
Government offices
Preceded by Eugene Allen Gilmore	Governor-General of the Philippines; 1929–1932	Succeeded by Theodore Roosevelt Jr.
Awards and achievements
Preceded by Plutarco Calles	Cover of Time magazine 15 December 1924	Succeeded by Alfonso XIII of Spain
