= William Easton (tennis) =

American tennis player

- Full name: William Easton
- Born: January 25, 1875
- Died: August 29, 1928 (aged 53)

William Easton (January 25, 1875 – August 29, 1928) was an American tennis player. He competed in the men's singles event at the 1904 Summer Olympics.
