= Forest Montgomery =

American tennis player

- Full name: Forest Montgomery
- Born: August 22, 1874
- Died: May 7, 1947 (aged 72)

Forest Montgomery (August 22, 1874 – May 7, 1947) was an American tennis player. He competed in the men's singles and doubles events at the 1904 Summer Olympics.
