= Max Lillie =

American aviator

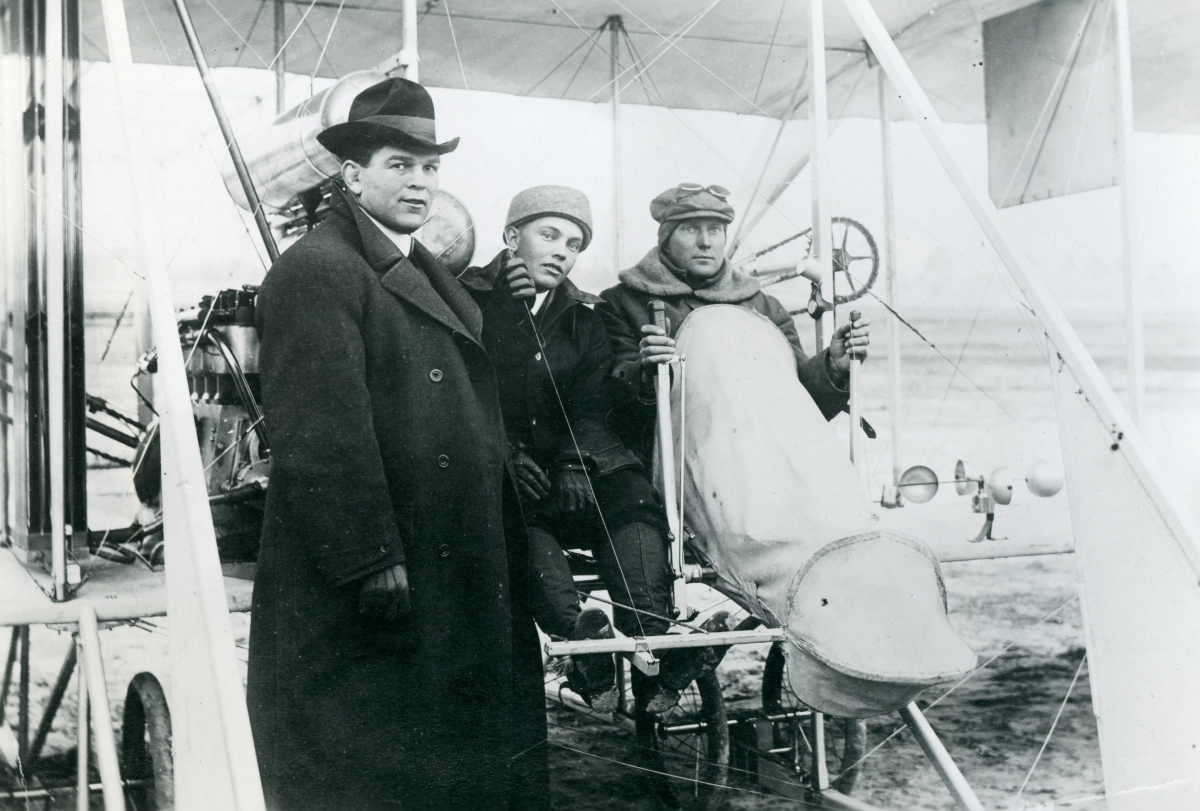
- Max Lillie (center) with pilot R.G. Fowler. Frank Gotch, a famous wrestler, on the left
- Born: Maximillian Theo Liljestrand; 1881; Stockholm, Sweden
- Died: September 15, 1913 (aged 31–32); Knox County, Illinois, US
- Resting place: Saint Peter's Cemetery, St. Louis Missouri
- Other names: Max T. Lillie; Max Lilizanstrom
- Occupation: aviator
- Years active: 1911–1913
- Spouse: Wynona Lillie

Max Lillie (1881 – September 15, 1913) was a Swedish born American pioneer aviator and flight instructor.

He went to an engineering university in his native country and served in the Swedish navy. He immigrated to the United States in 1904 and settled in St. Louis. In America he worked for an engineering and or construction company in St. Louis and in time formed his own construction company. In 1911 Lillie and Andrew Drew, a newspaper friend, got involved in aviation and formed an airplane company. They were joined by Walter Brookins, a former Wright Brothers pilot who taught Lillie to fly. Lillie soloed on October 23, 1911 and achieved ACA(Aero Club of America) certificate #73.

In the fall of 1911 Lillie gained total control of his airplane company venture and took his aircraft to the warmer climate of Atlanta, Georgia for the winter of 1911-12 returning to Chicago in the spring of 1912. Throughout the Spring and Summer of 1912 Lillie established his reputation as a flight instructor as well as a pilot carrying passengers and continuing exhibition flying. He completed Katherine Stinson's flight training on Wright Model B's after Wilbur Wright's death May 30, 1912. On September 14, 1912 he tried out for Expert Pilot License #1.

Lillie died in a plane crash September 15, 1913, in Galesburg, Illinois.
