= Tennis at the 1904 Summer Olympics – Men's singles =

Men's singles tennis at the Games of the III Olympiad
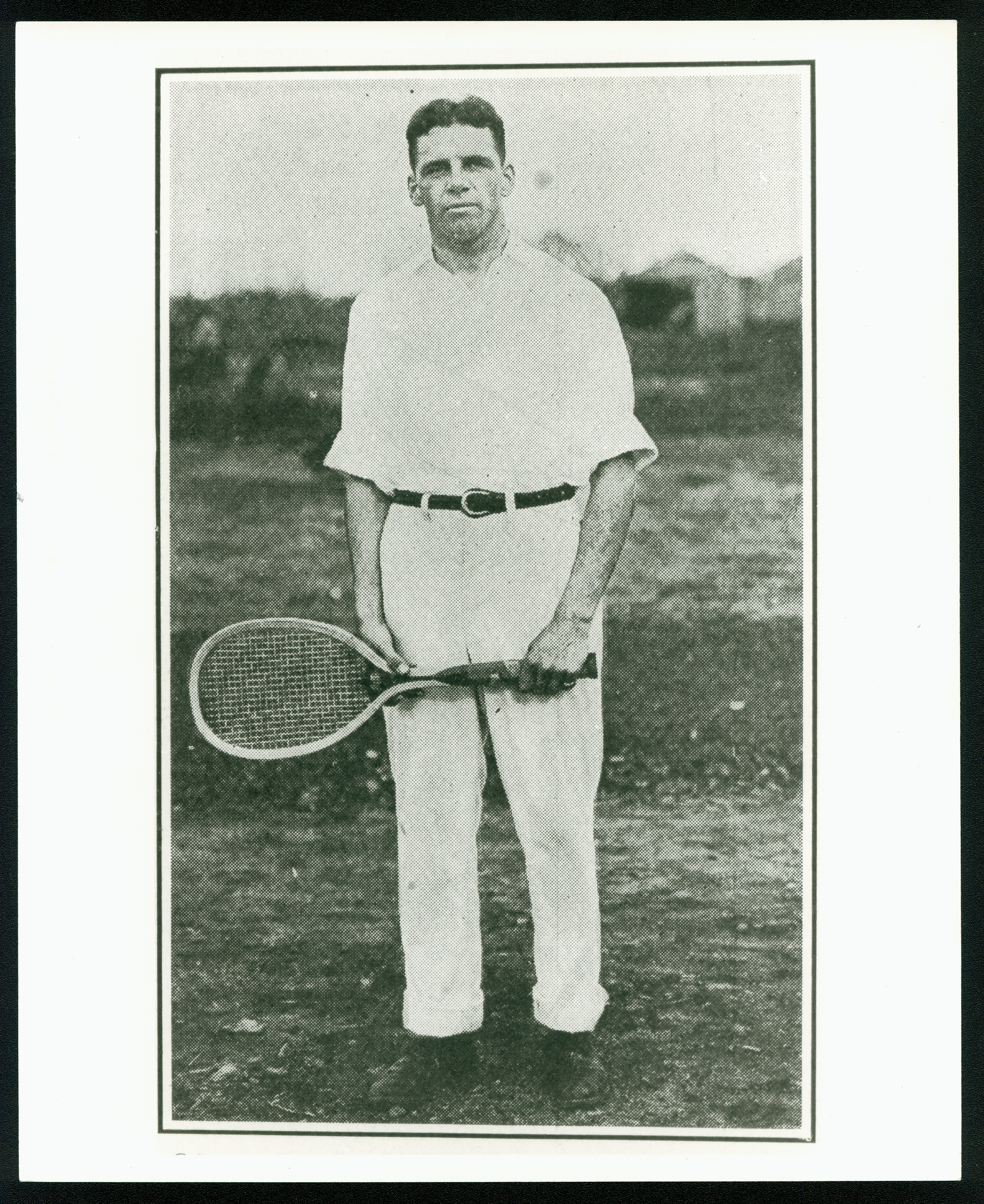
- Beals Wright
- Venue: Francis Field
- Dates: 29 August–3 September 1904
- Competitors: 27 from 2 nations

Medalists
1st place, gold medalist(s)		Beals Wright; United States
2nd place, silver medalist(s)		Robert LeRoy; United States
3rd place, bronze medalist(s)		Alphonzo Bell; United States
3rd place, bronze medalist(s)		Edgar Leonard; United States

Men's singles
- Tennis at the 1904 Summer Olympics

Events
Singles	men
Doubles	men
- Summer Olympics

The men's singles was a tennis event held as part of the tennis program at the 1904 Summer Olympics. It was the third time the event was held at the Olympics. There were 27 competitors from 2 nations. The event was won by Beals Wright, with the Americans sweeping the medals. Robert LeRoy finished second, with Alphonzo Bell and Edgar Leonard eliminated in the semifinals.

== Background ==
This was the third appearance of the men's singles tennis. The event has been held at every Summer Olympics where tennis has been on the program: from 1896 to 1924 and then from 1988 to the current program. Demonstration events were held in 1968 and 1984.

Beals Wright was one of the 1903 U.S. doubles champions. His compatriot Robert LeRoy was the 1903 European champion.

No nations made their debut in the event. Germany and the United States both made their second appearance.

== Competition format ==
The competition was a single-elimination tournament with no bronze-medal match (both semifinal losers tied for third). All matches, including the final, were best-of-three sets.

== Schedule ==
Date	Time	Round
Monday, 29 August 1904; Tuesday, 30 August; Wednesday, 31 August; Thursday, 1 September; Friday, 2 September; Saturday, 3 September		Round of 64; Round of 32; Round of 16; Quarterfinals; Semifinals; Final

== Draw ==
Key

- Q = Qualifier
- WC = Wild card
- LL = Lucky loser
- Alt = Alternate
- ITF = ITF entry
- PR = Protected ranking
- SR = Special ranking
- SE = Special exempt
- JE = Junior exempt
- JR = Junior Accelerator Programme entrant
- CO = College Accelerator Programme entrant
- NG = Next Gen Accelerator Program entrant
- w/o = Walkover
- r = Retired
- d = Defaulted

=== Finals ===
Quarterfinals
Beals Wright (USA)	6	6
John Neely (USA)	0	2
Alphonzo Bell (USA)	6	6
Semp Russ (USA)	3	1
Wilfred Blatherwick (USA)	2	0
Edgar Leonard (USA)	6	6
Charles Cresson (USA)	4	6
Robert LeRoy (USA)	6	8

Semifinals
Beals Wright (USA)	6	6
Alphonzo Bell (USA)	3	4
Edgar Leonard (USA)	3	3
Robert LeRoy (USA)	6	6

Final (gold-medal match)
Beals Wright (USA)	6	6
Robert LeRoy (USA)	3	4

=== Top half ===
==== Section 1 ====
First round

Second round
B Wright (USA)	6	6
F Montgomery (USA)	3	1
H Hardy (GER)
F Eberhardt (USA)	w/o
J Neely (USA)	6	6
M MacDonald (USA)	1	1
F Feitshans (USA)	8	6
J Charles (USA)	6	1

Third round
B Wright (USA)	6	6
H Hardy (GER)	2	1
J Neely (USA)	6	6
F Feitshans (USA)	0	2

Quarterfinals
B Wright (USA)	6	6
J Neely (USA)	0	2

==== Section 2 ====
First round
S Russ (USA)
NM Smith (USA)	w/o
D Turner (USA)
J Eberhardt (USA)	w/o

Second round
A Bell (USA)	6	6
O Vernon (USA)	3	2
D Davis (USA)	6	6
S Tritle (USA)	2	1
H Jones (USA)	6	6
A Drew (USA)	4	1
S Russ (USA)	6	6
D Turner (USA)	2	1

Third round
A Bell (USA)
D Davis (USA)	w/o
H Jones (USA)	1	2
S Russ (USA)	6	6

Quarterfinals
A Bell (USA)	6	6
S Russ (USA)	3	1

=== Bottom half ===
==== Section 3 ====
First round
N Semple (USA)	6	6
G Stadel (USA)	2	1
W Blatherwick (USA)
M Bergfeld (USA)	w/o
H Jacobs (USA)
J Benger (USA)	w/o

Second round
N Semple (USA)	6	4	1
W Blatherwick (USA)	4	6	6
H Jacobs (USA)	w/o
J Cunningham (USA)
W Easton (USA)	2	2
R McKittrick (USA)	6	6
C Forney (USA)	1	1
E Leonard (USA)	6	6

Third round
W Blatherwick (USA)	6	0	6
J Cunningham (USA)	2	6	4
R McKittrick (USA)	4	4
E Leonard (USA)	6	6

Quarterfinals
W Blatherwick (USA)	2	0
E Leonard (USA)	6	6

==== Section 4 ====
First round

Second round
F Rahe (GER)	w/o
H Holland (USA)
F Wheaton (USA)	2	4
C Cresson (USA)	6	6
J Elliott (USA)	w/o
F Sanderson (USA)
T Holland (USA)	w/o
R LeRoy (USA)

Third round
H Holland (USA)	w/o
C Cresson (USA)
F Sanderson (USA)	3	3
R LeRoy (USA)	6	6

Quarterfinals
C Cresson (USA)	4	6
R LeRoy (USA)	6	8

== Results summary ==
Rank	Player	Nation	Round of 64	Round of 32	Round of 16	Quarterfinals	Semifinals	Final
1st place, gold medalist(s)	Beals Wright	United States	Bye	Montgomery (USA); W 6–3, 6–1	Hardy (GER); W 6–2, 6–1	Neely (USA); W 6–0, 6–2	Bell (USA); W 6–3, 6–4	LeRoy (USA); W 6–3, 6–4
2nd place, silver medalist(s)	Robert LeRoy	United States	Bye	T Holland (USA); W w/o	Sanderson (USA); W 6–3, 6–3	Cresson (USA); W 6–4, 8–6	Leonard (USA); W 6–3, 6–3	Wright (USA); L 6–3, 6–4
3rd place, bronze medalist(s)	Alphonzo Bell	United States	Bye	Vernon (USA); W 6–3, 6–2	Davis (USA); W w/o	Russ (USA); W 6–3, 6–1	Wright (USA); L 6–3, 6–4	Did not advance
3rd place, bronze medalist(s)	Edgar Leonard	United States	Bye	Forney (USA); W 6–1, 6–1	McKittrick (USA); W 6–2, 6–2	Blatherwick (USA); W 6–2, 6–0	LeRoy (USA); L 6–3, 6–3	Did not advance
5	Wilfred Blatherwick	United States	Bergfeld (USA); W w/o	Semple (USA); W 4–6, 6–4, 6–1	Cunningham (USA); W 6–2, 0–6, 6–4	Leonard (USA); L 6–2, 6–0	did not advance	
5	Charles Cresson	United States	Bye	Wheaton (USA); W 6–2, 6–4	H Holland (USA); W w/o	LeRoy (USA); L 6–4, 8–6	did not advance	
5	John Neely	United States	Bye	MacDonald (USA); W 6–1, 6–1	Feitshans (USA); W 6–0, 6–2	Wright (USA); L 6–0, 6–2	did not advance	
5	Semp Russ	United States	Smith (USA); W w/o	Turner (USA); W 6–2, 6–1	Jones (USA); W 6–1, 6–2	Bell (USA); L 6–3, 6–1	did not advance	
9	Joe Cunningham	United States	Bye	Jacobs (USA); W w/o	Blatherwick (USA); L 6–2, 0–6, 6–4	did not advance		
9	Dwight F. Davis	United States	Bye	Tritle (USA); W 6–2, 6–1	Bell (USA); L w/o	did not advance		
9	Rollin Feitshans	United States	Bye	Charles (USA); W 8–6, 6–1	Neely (USA); L 6–0, 6–2	did not advance		
9	Hugo Hardy	Germany	Bye	F. Eberhardt (USA); W w/o	Wright (USA); L 6–2, 6–1	did not advance		
9	Hugh Jones	United States	Bye	Drew (USA); W 6–4, 6–1	Russ (USA); L 6–1, 6–2	did not advance		
9	Ralph McKittrick	United States	Bye	Easton (USA); W 6–2, 6–2	Leonard (USA); L 6–2, 6–2	did not advance		
9	Fred Sanderson	United States	Bye	Elliott (USA); W w/o	LeRoy (USA); L 6–3, 6–3	did not advance		
16	Joseph Charles	United States	Bye	Feitshans (USA); L 8–6, 6–1	did not advance			
16	Andrew Drew	United States	Bye	Jones (USA); L 6–4, 6–1	did not advance			
16	William Easton	United States	Bye	McKittrick (USA); L 6–2, 6–2	did not advance			
16	Chris Forney	United States	Bye	Leonard (USA); L 6–1, 6–1	did not advance			
16	Malcolm MacDonald	United States	Bye	Neely (USA); L 6–1, 6–1	did not advance			
16	Forest Montgomery	United States	Bye	Wright (USA); L 6–3, 6–1	did not advance			
16	Nathaniel Semple	United States	Stadel (USA); W 6–2, 6–1	Blatherwick (USA); L 4–6, 6–4, 6–1	did not advance			
16	Stewart Tritle	United States	Bye	Davis (USA); L 6–2, 6–1	did not advance			
16	Douglas Turner	United States	J Eberhardt (USA); W w/o	Russ (USA); L 6–2, 6–1	did not advance			
16	Orien Vernon	United States	Bye	Bell (USA); L 6–3, 6–2	did not advance			
16	Frank Wheaton	United States	Bye	Cresson (USA); L 6–2, 6–4	did not advance			
27	George Stadel	United States	Semple (USA); L 6–2, 6–1	did not advance				
—	Benger	United States	Jacobs (USA); L w/o	did not advance				
—	M. Bergfeld	United States	Blatherwick (USA); L w/o	did not advance				
—	H. Holland	United States	Bye	Rahe (GER); W w/o	Cresson (USA); L w/o	did not advance		
—	Frank Eberhardt	United States	Bye	Hardy (GER); L w/o	did not advance			
—	John Eberhardt	United States	Turner (USA); L w/o	did not advance				
—	J. Elliott	United States	Bye	Fred Sanderson (USA); L w/o	did not advance			
—	Thomas Holland	United States	Bye	LeRoy (USA); L w/o	did not advance			
—	H. W. Jacobs	United States	Benger (USA); W w/o	Cunningham (USA); L w/o	did not advance			
—	Friedrich Wilhelm Rahe	Germany	Bye	H. Holland (USA); L w/o	did not advance			
—	N. M. Smith	United States	Russ (USA); L w/o	did not advance				
