= Army Specialist Corps =

US Army civilian specialist branch during World War II

US Army Specialist Corps Cap Insignia

The United States Army Specialist Corps was a uniformed branch of civilian specialists employed by the U.S. Army during World War II. Men enlisted were not considered "upon active Military or Naval service".

== Creation ==
Following the Attack on Pearl Harbor the United States Army Services of Supply required the direct enlistment of a vast amount of experienced civilian specialists, many of whom whose age or physical fitness would not meet the standard Army requirements. There was a great debate within the Army whether these new specialists should be enlisted and placed in Army uniforms, or remain civilians employed by the Army, who could be enlisted at a more rapid rate than the usual requests for commissions. The United States Secretary of War Henry L. Stimson favored a separate body of skilled specialists in business, technical and professional matters who would be uniformed, but not have any command functions.

Section 1 of Executive Order 9078, dated 26 February 1942, established "in the War Department, under the supervision and direction of the Secretary of War, a corps of uniformed civilian employees to be known as the Army Specialist Corps.". Selective Service registrants likely to be drafted were ineligible, with the ASC recruiting men over the age of thirty years old, those that had a III-A Selective Service classification (registrant deferred because of hardship to dependents) or men under thirty years old categorized as IV-F (registrant ineligible for service for, among other reasons, physical handicap). Dwight F. Davis was commissioned the Director General of the Army Specialist Corps (ASC).

== Skills ==
Men were commissioned in rank from Second Lieutenant to Colonel and enlisted from Corporal to Master Sergeant for the duration of the war and six months after.

Skills in demand were:

- Engineers and Production Men
- Chemists
- Communications Men
- Transportation Men
- Businessmen, Bankers and Lawyers
- Accountants
- Warehousemen
- Miscellaneous (linguists, entertainers)

The Office of Strategic Services was initially considered by General George C. Marshall to be under the aegis of the ASC.

== Uniforms and insignia ==
Though a civilian organization, members of the ASC were given military uniforms in order to comply with the rules of war if members were captured by the enemy. Initially, the ASC wore regular US Army olive drab or khaki cotton uniforms with the only insignia being the standard Army Noncombatant insignia. In July 1942, General Marshall authorized the wear of standard U.S. Army uniforms, but with grey plastic buttons and insignia; the "U.S." on the upper lapels of the dress tunic and "A.S.C." on the lower lapels in grey plastic along with a grey plastic hat badge of a U.S. eagle holding a bolt of arrows. Standard Army rank insignia was worn, with a cloth burgundy colored "A.S.C." tab worn beneath the chevrons. A burgundy backing to the badges and cuff braid was also worn. Army service numbers began with the letter "S"

== Demise and disbandment ==
During the period in which the Corps was being formed, a large number of specialists were also being directly commissioned into the Army of the United States. Disadvantages of the increased complexity of duties in the Army, the reluctance of military commanders losing picked civilian aides and specialists, and the belated organisation of the Corps led to the disbandment of the ASC and recruits being enlisted into the Army Service Forces instead. The ASC was disbanded on 1 November 1942. After that date, specialists were commissioned into the Specialists Reserve Section of the Officers Reserve Corps

== Notable members ==
- Dwight F. Davis
- Maurice Evans
- Wayne King
- Glenn Miller
- Archibald Roosevelt
