= H. LaVerne Westfall =

American tennis player

H.L. Westfall
- Full name: Herbert LaVerne Westfall
- Country (sports): United States
- Born: August 9, 1886; Newark, New York, US
- Died: November 7, 1949 (aged 63); Brooklyn, New York, US

Singles

Grand Slam singles results
- US Open: QF (1907)

H. LaVerne Westfall (August 9, 1886 – November 7, 1949) was an American tennis player active in the early 20th century.

== Tennis career ==
Westfall reached the quarterfinals of the U.S. National Championships in 1907, also making the fourth round the following year.

=== Grand Slam tournament performance timeline ===
Key
W	F	SF	QF	#R	RR	Q#	DNQ	A	NH

(W) winner; (F) finalist; (SF) semifinalist; (QF) quarterfinalist; (#R) rounds 4, 3, 2, 1; (RR) round-robin stage; (Q#) qualification round; (DNQ) did not qualify; (A) absent; (NH) not held; (SR) strike rate (events won / competed); (W–L) win–loss record.

Tournament	1907	1908	1917
Grand Slam tournaments
Australian Open	A	A	A
Wimbledon	A	A	A
US Open	QF	4R	2R
