= Wilfred Blatherwick =

American tennis player

- Born: September 19, 1870 Black Hawk County, Iowa, United States
- Died: April 7, 1956 (aged 85) Los Angeles, California, United States

Wilfred Blatherwick (September 19, 1870 – April 7, 1956) was an American tennis player. He competed in the men's singles and doubles events at the 1904 Summer Olympics.
