= Frank Wheaton (tennis) =

American tennis player

- Born: October 15, 1876 Putnam, Connecticut, United States
- Died: October 29, 1965 (aged 89) Bellingham, Washington, United States

Frank Wheaton (October 15, 1876 – October 29, 1965) was an American tennis player. He competed in the men's singles and doubles events at the 1904 Summer Olympics.
