= Andrew Drew =

American tennis player

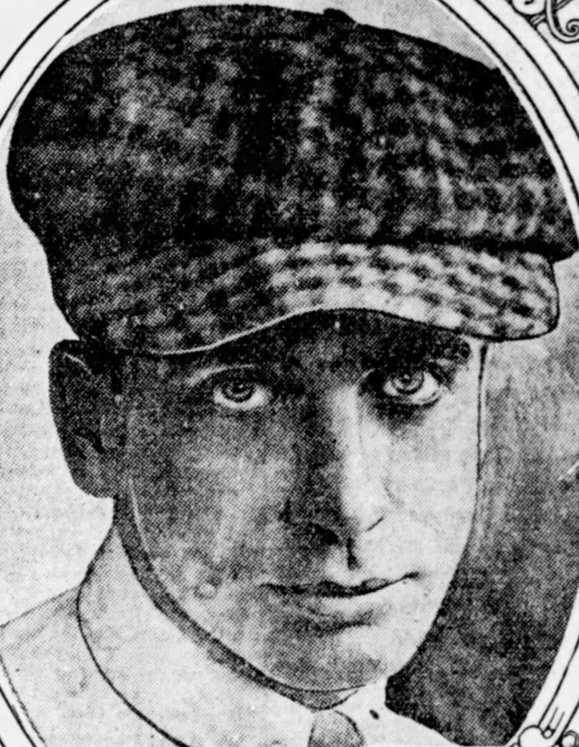
- Born: February 1885
- Died: June 12, 1913 (aged 28); Lima, Ohio, US
- Occupations: Tennis player, balloonist, aviator
- Years active: 1904–1913

Andrew Drew (February 1885 – June 12, 1913) was an American tennis player. He competed in the men's singles and doubles events at the 1904 Summer Olympics.

== Aviation ==
Drew had been a balloonist in St. Louis before leaving in August 1911 to be trained at the Wright Brothers school in Ohio. Later he worked as an instructor for his friend Max Lillie who owned and flew Wright type airplanes. He later served as Field Director at the Cicero Flying Field in Chicago from the spring of 1912 to October 1912. On June 12, 1913, at Lima, Ohio he took off in a Wright Model B and at 600 feet his gas tank exploded and rode the wreck down to his death.
