= Chris Forney =

American tennis player

- Full name: Chris Forney
- Born: April 21, 1878
- Died: September 14, 1912 (aged 34) Topeka, Kansas, United States

Chris Forney (April 21, 1878 – September 14, 1912) was an American tennis player. He competed in the men's singles event at the 1904 Summer Olympics.
