= Semp Russ =

American tennis player (1878–1978)

- Born: April 16, 1878 DeSoto Parish, Louisiana, United States
- Died: March 12, 1978 (aged 99) San Antonio, Texas, United States

Semponius "Semp" Russ (April 16, 1878 – March 12, 1978) was an American tennis player. He competed in the men's singles and doubles events at the 1904 Summer Olympics. He was also the quarterback of the Texas Longhorns from 1898 to 1900; chosen for an all-time Texas team by R. W. Franklin.
