= Nathaniel Semple =

American tennis player (1876–1913)

- Born: October 22, 1876; Liberty, Missouri, United States
- Died: October 3, 1913 (aged 36); St. Louis, Missouri, United States
- Education: Washington University in St. Louis
- Known for: Tennis player in the 1904 Summer Olympics

Nathaniel Semple (October 22, 1876 – October 3, 1913) was an American tennis player. He competed in the men's singles and doubles events at the 1904 Summer Olympics.

He earned a medical degree from Washington University School of Medicine in 1897. He died at his home in St. Louis on October 3, 1913.
