= Richard H. Palmer =

American tennis player

Richard Palmer
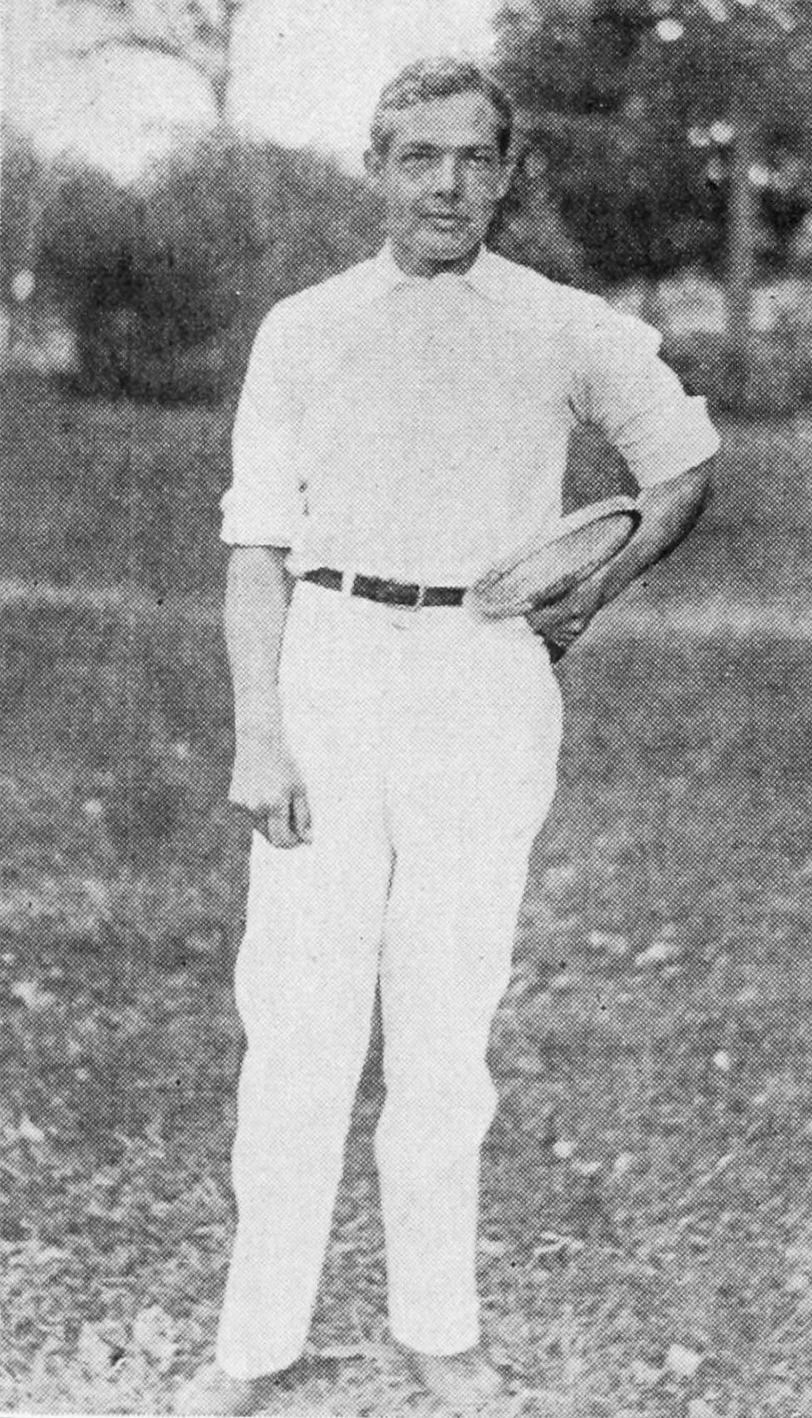
- Palmer c. 1908
- Full name: Richard Holkins Palmer
- Country (sports): United States
- Born: March 14, 1876 Jersey City, New Jersey, US
- Died: November 14, 1931 (aged 55) Ridgewood, New Jersey, US
- Turned pro: 1892 (amateur)
- Retired: 1914
- Plays: Left-handed (one-handed backhand)

Singles
- Career record: 96-38 (69.6%)
- Career titles: 7

Grand Slam singles results
- US Open: QF (1907, 1909)

Richard Holkins Palmer (1876–1931) of Ridgewood, New Jersey, also known by his nick name as Lefty Palmer was an American tennis player.

== Biography ==
He was born on March 14, 1876, in Jersey City, New Jersey to Harriet Jane Holkins and Frederick Eugene Palmer. He married Marion Louise Aiken and they lived in Ridgewood, New Jersey. He died November 14, 1931, in Ridgewood, New Jersey.

== Tennis career ==
Palmer reached the quarterfinals of the U.S. National Championships in 1907 and 1909. In 1908, he cracked the U.S. singles Top 10, coming in at No. 10. A lefty, he was known as The New Jersey Southpaw.

At the Cincinnati Open, Palmer made six finals appearances: three each in singles and doubles. He won two singles titles (1910 & 1911) and two doubles titles (1909 with Carlton R. Gardner, and 1910 with Wallace Johnson).
