= Hugo Hardy =

Tennis players

- Full name: Hugo James Hardy
- Born: 16 October 1877; Hamburg, Germany
- Died: 8 October 1936 (aged 58); Berlin, Germany

Hugo James Hardy (16 October 1877 – 8 October 1936) was a German tennis player and jurist. He competed in the men's singles and doubles events at the 1904 Summer Olympics in St. Louis, where he was the only non-American competitor.

A lawyer, Hardy was on the board of an early version of the Deutschen Reichsausschuß für Olympische Spiele (DRA), a predecessor to the German Olympic Committee that oversaw sports in the Weimar Republic.

Hardy was born in Hamburg, the son of banker James Nathan Hardy and Helena Ida Noemie Cahn.
