= Hugh Jones (tennis) =

American tennis player

- Born: November 10, 1880 St. Louis, Missouri, United States
- Died: May 1, 1960 (aged 79) Madison, Wisconsin, United States

Hugh Jones (November 10, 1880 – May 1, 1960) was an American tennis player. He competed in the men's singles and doubles events at the 1904 Summer Olympics.
