= Orien Vernon =

American tennis player

- Born: September 7, 1874 Kansas, United States
- Died: June 24, 1951 (aged 76)

Orien Vernon (September 7, 1874 – June 24, 1951) was an American tennis player. He competed in the men's singles and doubles events at the 1904 Summer Olympics.
