= Douglas Turner (tennis) =

American tennis player

- Full name: Douglas Turner

Douglas Turner was an American tennis player. He competed in the men's singles and doubles events at the 1904 Summer Olympics.
