= Henry Mollenhauer =

American tennis player and musician

- Full name: Henry Mollenhauer junior
- Country (sports): United States
- Born: December 28, 1876; Brooklyn, New York, United States
- Died: After 1942; New York, United States
- Turned pro: 1905 (amateur tour)
- Retired: 1911

Singles

Grand Slam singles results
- US Open: SF (1907)

Henry Mollenhauer (1876–19??) was an American tennis player and musician. He was born in Brooklyn, New York. His family were musicians and Henry played the violin. He ran the Henry Mollenhauer Conservatory of Music (set up by his father Henry senior). The highlight of his tennis career was when he reached the semifinals of the 1907 U.S. Championships singles. The semi final between Mollenhauer and Robert LeRoy was marred with controversy when a questionable call went against Mollenhauer. Mollenhauer led two sets to one, 5–2 and had two match points when LeRoy hit a shot that looked out but was called good. Then Mollenhauer suffered from cramps in his arm and legs and lost in five sets. Mollenhauer was nicknamed "The Flying Dutchman" and played with "dash and vim", according to The Brooklyn Daily Eagle. That was Henry's only appearance in the U. S. championships singles. Henry died some time after 1942.
