= Malcolm Ross-Macdonald =

British writer and artist (1932–2024)

- Born: 1932; Shropshire, England
- Died: 25 February 2024 (aged 91–92); Tullamore
- Occupations: editor, author
- Writing career
- Pen name: Malcolm Macdonald, M.R. O'Donnell
- Language: English

Malcolm Ross-Macdonald (Malcolm John Macdonald) (1932 in Shropshire–25 February 2024 in Tullamore) was a British born writer and artist.

After growing up in England, South Africa and Scotland, he attended Falmouth School of Art and the Slade. Afterwards, he taught in Sweden. He started writing historical novels, the first one of which was published in 1962, but also wrote non-fiction in his role as an encyclopedia editor at Aldus Books. He was executive editor of Aldus Books from 1964 to 1966. After the 1974 publication of his historic novel The World from Rough Stones, he became a full-time historical novelist. He continued to write in total about 30 historical novels.

Pseudonyms he used are Malcolm Macdonald, Malcolm Ross and M. R. O'Donnell.

His wife was Ingrid, and he had two daughters, Petra and Candida with whom he had moved to County Offaly in the 1970s. He spent his last years in Banagher.

== Works (Selection) ==
- The Big Waves (1962)
- Beyond the Horizon (1971)
- The Dukes (1981)
- Golden Eye (1981)
- On a Far Wild Shore (1986)
- A Notorious Woman (1988)
- Mistress of Pallas (1989)
- An Innocent Woman (1989)
- Hell Hath No Fury (1990), as M.R. O'Donnell
- A Woman Alone (1990)
- A Woman Scorned (1991), as M.R. O'Donnell
- A Woman Possessed (1992)
- All Desires Known (1993), as M.R. O'Donnell
- To the End of Her Days (1994)
- For I Have Sinned (1994), as M.R. O'Donnell
- The Trevarton Inheritance (1996)
- Penny Child (1996)
- Tomorrow's Tide (1996)
- The Carringtons of Helston (1997)
- Like a Diamond (1998)
- Tamsin Harte (2000)
- Rose of Nancemellin (2001)
