= Arthur Wear =

American tennis player

Personal information
- Born: March 1, 1880 St. Louis, Missouri, United States
- Died: November 6, 1918 (aged 38) Argonne Forest, France
Medal record
Men's Tennis
Olympic Games
Bronze medal – third place	1904 St. Louis	Doubles

Arthur Yancey Wear (March 1, 1880 – November 6, 1918) was an American tennis player who competed in the 1904 Summer Olympics. He was the son of James H. Wear and the brother of Joseph Wear. In 1904 he won the bronze medal with his partner Clarence Gamble in the doubles competition. He died during the Meuse-Argonne Offensive in France in World War I.

== Personal life ==
Wear served as a captain in the 89th Infantry Division during World War I. He died of a perforated ulcer during the Meuse-Argonne Offensive in November 1918. He is buried at Meuse-Argonne American Cemetery.

== See also ==
- List of Olympians killed in World War I
