= Joseph Wear =

American tennis player

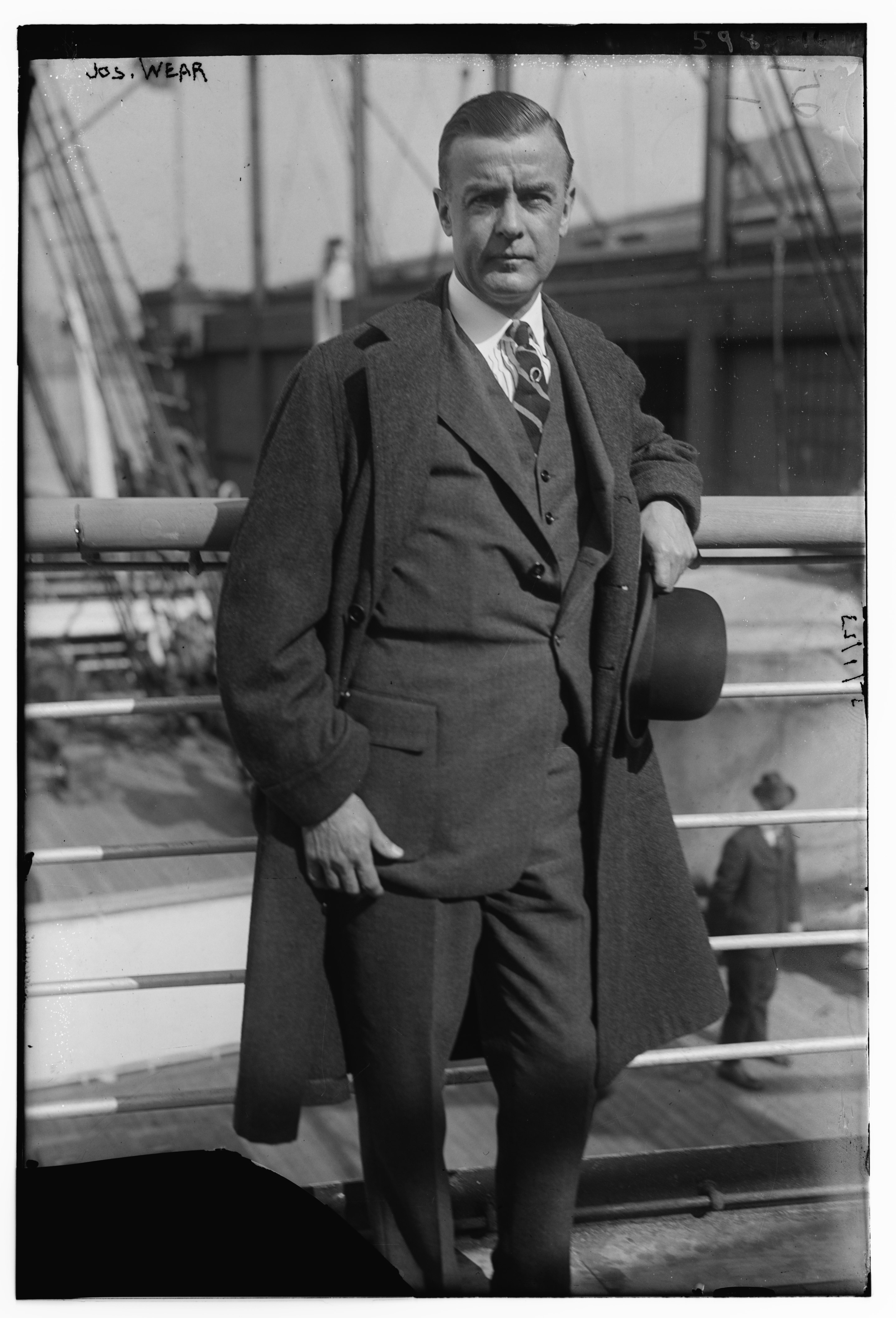
- Wear in 1900

Personal information
- Born: November 27, 1876 St. Louis, Missouri, United States
- Died: June 4, 1941 (aged 64) Philadelphia, Pennsylvania, United States
Medal record
Men's Tennis
| Bronze medal – third place | 1904 St. Louis | Doubles |

Joseph Walker Wear (November 27, 1876 – June 4, 1941) was an American tennis player who competed in the 1904 Summer Olympics.

He was the son of James H. Wear and the brother of Arthur Wear.

In 1904 he won the bronze medal with his partner Allen West in the doubles competition.
