= Allen West (tennis) =

American tennis player

Olympic medal record

Men's Tennis
Bronze medal – third place	1904 St. Louis	Doubles

Allen Tarwater West (August 2, 1872 – August 31, 1952) was an American tennis player who competed in the 1904 Summer Olympics. In 1904 he won the bronze medal with his partner Joseph Wear in the doubles competition.
