= Joe Cunningham (tennis) =

American tennis player

- Full name: Joe Cunningham
- Born: February 26, 1867
- Died: July 27, 1951 (aged 84)

Joseph Leverett Cunningham (February 26, 1867 – July 27, 1951) was an American tennis player. He competed in the men's singles events at the 1904 Summer Olympics.
