= John Neely (tennis) =

American tennis player

- Full name: John Crosby Neely
- Country (sports): United States
- Born: May 26, 1872; Chicago, United States
- Died: March 22, 1941 (aged 68); New York, United States

Singles

Grand Slam singles results
- US Open: 1R (1895, 1896, 1902)

Other tournaments
- Olympic Games: QF (1904)

John Neely (May 26, 1872 – March 22, 1941) was an American male tennis player. He competed in the singles event at the 1904 Summer Olympics and reached the quarterfinal in which he lost to compatriot and eventual Olympic champion Beals Wright.

Neeley attended Princeton University, where he graduated in engineering in 1894.

On February 13, 1914, Neely, who was at that time a banker in Chicago, was shot and seriously wounded during an attempted robbery.
