= Nat Thornton =

American tennis player

Nathaniel Thornton was an American tennis player for the Atlanta Athletic Club. He also played basketball, selected All-Southern in 1910. He was elected to the Georgia Sports Hall of Fame in 2024. He won second place in doubles at the 1907 US Open, along with Brian Grant, Bitsy Grant's father. Thornton's picture hangs in Atlanta's largest tennis center, the Bitsy Grant Tennis Center.
