= Malcolm MacDonald (tennis) =

American tennis player

- Full name: Malcolm MacDonald
- Born: September 16, 1865
- Died: September 6, 1921 (aged 55)

Malcolm MacDonald (September 16, 1865 – September 6, 1921) was an American tennis player. He competed in the men's singles and doubles events at the 1904 Summer Olympics.
