= Edgar Leonard =

American tennis player

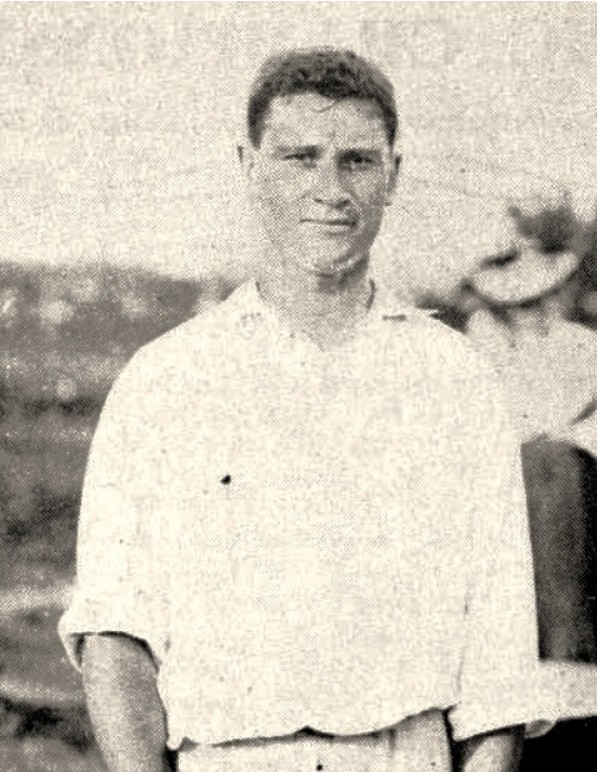
- Full name: Edgar Welch Leonard
- Country (sports): United States
- Born: June 19, 1881 West Newton, Massachusetts, USA
- Died: October 7, 1948 (aged 67) New York City, New York, USA
- College: Harvard University

Singles
- Career record: 11–6

Grand Slam singles results
- US Open: SF (1904)

Doubles
- Career record: no value
Medal record
Representing United States
Olympic Games
Gold medal – first place	1904 St. Louis	Men's doubles
Bronze medal – third place	1904 St. Louis	Men's singles

Edgar Welch Leonard (June 19, 1881 – October 7, 1948) was a Harvard graduate and male tennis player from the United States.

He is best known for his gold medal at the St. Louis Olympics (1904) in the men's doubles event, with partner Beals Wright. In the men's singles event, he won a bronze medal.

Leonard reached the semifinals of the U.S. National Championships in 1904 and the quarterfinals in 1901 and 1906.

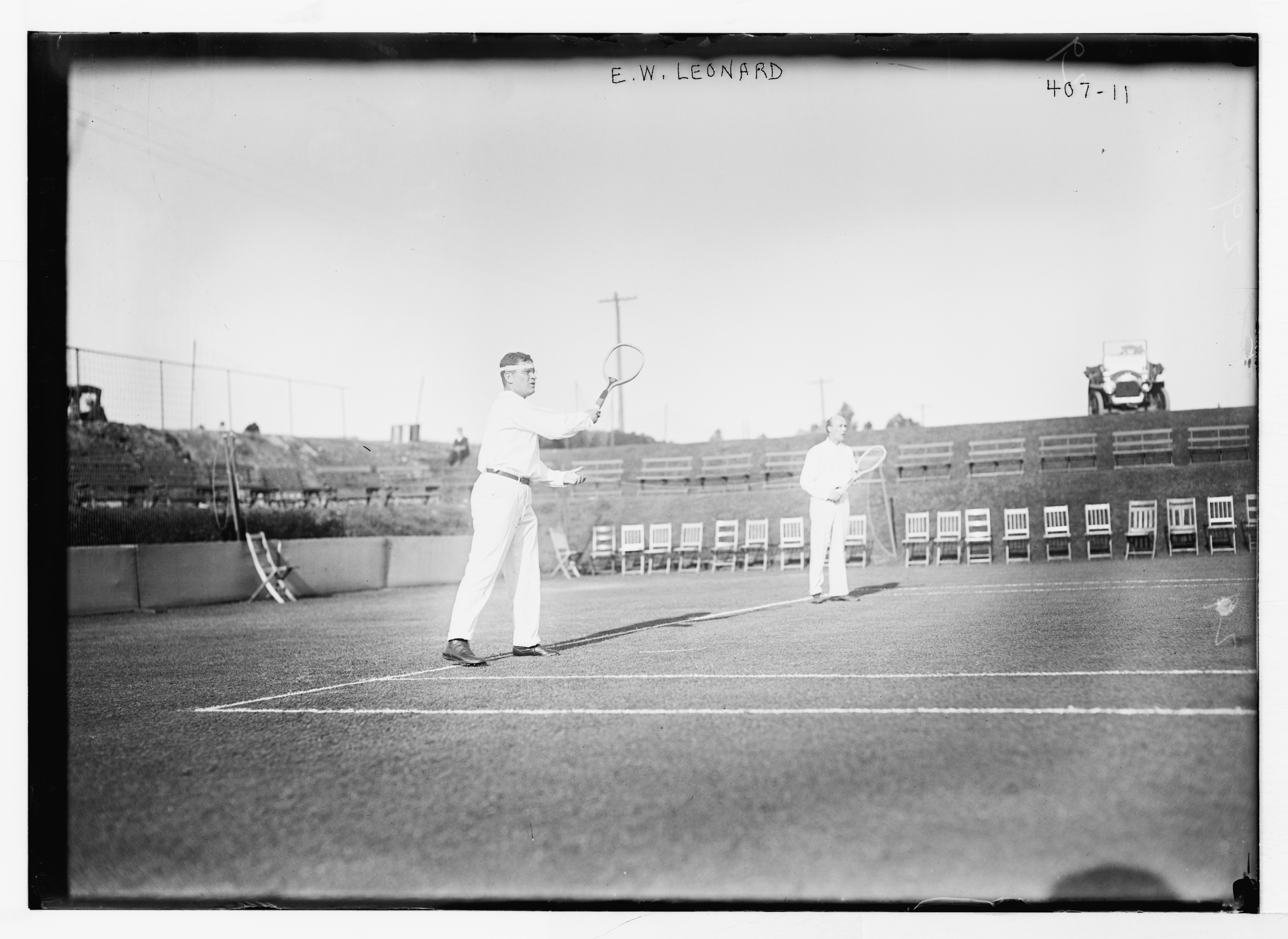
E.W. Leonard playing a tennis match, June 1908

At the Cincinnati Open in 1904, Leonard was a singles quarterfinalist and a doubles finalist (with Beals Wright).
