= Clarence Gamble (tennis) =

American tennis player

Olympic medal record

Men's Tennis
| Bronze medal – third place | 1904 St. Louis | Doubles |

Clarence Oliver Gamble (August 16, 1881 – June 13, 1952) was an American tennis player who competed in the 1904 Summer Olympics.

In 1904 he won the bronze medal with his partner Arthur Wear in the doubles competition.
