= Robert LeRoy =

American tennis player

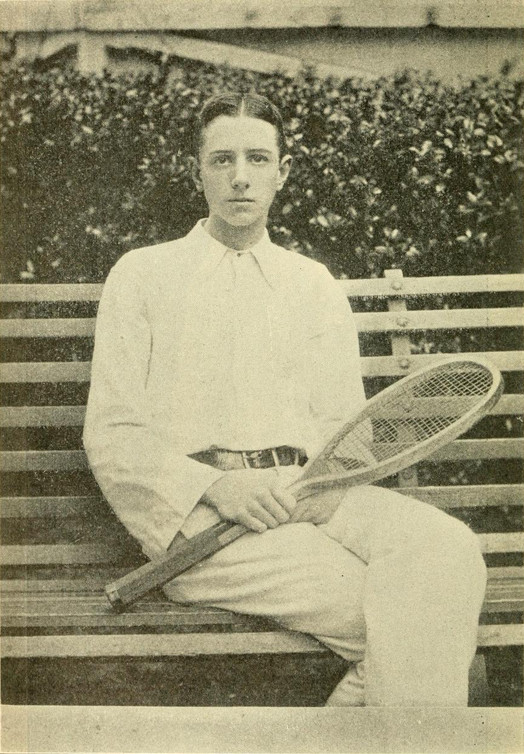
- LeRoy in 1904
- Country (sports): United States
- Born: February 7, 1885 New York City
- Died: September 7, 1946 (aged 61) New York City
- Turned pro: 1901 (amateur tour)
- Retired: 1931
- College: Columbia University

Grand Slam singles results
- US Open: F (1907)
Medal record
Representing United States
Olympic Games
Silver medal – second place	1904 St. Louis	Singles
Silver medal – second place	1904 St. Louis	Doubles

Robert LeRoy (February 7, 1885 – September 7, 1946) was a tennis player from New York City in the United States who won two medals at the 1904 Summer Olympics in St. Louis. He won a Silver medal in both the men's singles event and the men's doubles tournament, partnering Alphonzo Bell.

== Tennis career ==
He played collegiate tennis at Columbia University, where in 1904 and 1906, he won the National Collegiate Athletic Association singles championship.

In 1907, he was a singles finalist at the U.S. National Championships, now known as the US Open. In the semi-finals against Henry Mollenhauer, LeRoy trailed 2 sets to 1 and 5–2, and Mollenhauer had two match points. A questionable line call and his opponent suffering from cramps allowed LeRoy to reach the final, where he lost in straight sets to eventual seven times champion William Larned.

At the Cincinnati Open, he won three consecutive singles titles (1907–1909) and reached another singles final (1906). In doubles, he won two titles (1904 and 1905, both with Raymond D. Little) and reached another doubles final (1907 with Irving Wright). In mixed doubles in Cincinnati, he won the title in 1904 with Winona Closterman and reached two other mixed doubles finals (1905 with Helen Homans and 1907 with Marjorie Dodd).

== Grand Slam finals ==
=== Singles: (1 runner-up) ===
Result	Year	Championship	Surface	Opponent	Score
Loss	1907	U.S. National Championships	Grass	(United States) William Larned	2–6, 2–6, 4–6
